= Figure skating at the 2024 Winter Youth Olympics =

Figure skating at the IV Winter Youth Olympic Games
- Venue: Gangneung Ice Arena
- Dates: 27 January – 1 February
- Competitors: 68 from 25 nations

Figure skating at the 2024 Winter Youth Olympics took place at the Gangneung Ice Arena in Gangneung, South Korea, from 27 January to 1 February 2024.

Unlike previous Winter Youth Olympic figure skating events, which all included a mixed National Olympic Committee (NOC) team trophy, the 2024 event featured a team event between NOCs.

== Medal summary ==
Rank	Nation	Gold	Silver	Bronze	Total
1	South Korea	2	1	0	3
2	Canada	1	0	1	2
2	Japan	1	0	1	2
4	France	1	0	0	1
5	United States	0	3	0	3
6	Slovakia	0	1	0	1
7	Great Britain	0	0	1	1
7	New Zealand	0	0	1	1
7	Spain	0	0	1	1
Totals (9 entries)		5	5	5	15

=== Medalists ===
Discipline	Gold	Silver	Bronze	Ref.
Men	(South Korea); Kim Hyun-gyeom	(Slovakia); Adam Hagara	(New Zealand); Li Yanhao	
Women	(Japan); Mao Shimada	(South Korea); Shin Ji-a	(Japan); Yo Takagi	
Pairs	(Canada); Annika Behnke; Kole Sauve	(United States); Cayla Smith; Jared McPike	(Spain); Carolina Campillo; Pau Vilella	
Ice dance	(France); Ambre Perrier-Gianesini; Samuel Blanc-Klaperman	(United States); Olivia Ilin; Dylan Cain	(United Kingdom); Ashlie Slatter; Atl Ongay-Perez	
Team event	(South Korea); Kim Hyun-gyeom	(United States); Jacob Sanchez	(Canada); David Li	
Team event	(South Korea); Shin Ji-a	(United States); Sherry Zhang	(Canada); Kaiya Ruiter	
Team event	(South Korea); Kim Jin-ny; Lee Na-mu	(United States); Cayla Smith; Jared McPike	(Canada); Annika Behnke; Kole Sauve	
Team event	(South Korea); Kim Jin-ny; Lee Na-mu	(United States); Olivia Ilin; Dylan Cain	(Canada); Audra Gans; Michael Boutsan	

== Eligibility ==
Skaters are eligible to participate at the 2024 Winter Youth Olympics if they were born between 1 January 2006 and 31 December 2009.

== Qualification system ==
The overall quota for the figure skating competition is 72 total skaters. The maximum number of entries that a National Olympic Committee (NOC) can qualify is two per event, making 12 (six men and six women) the maximum number of entries that a country can qualify.

If a country hosted a skater in the first, second, or third position in a 2023 World Junior Figure Skating Championships discipline, they qualify for two spots in that discipline at the Winter Youth Olympics. All other nations can enter one athlete until a quota spot of twelve for each singles event, seven for pairs, and nine for ice dance, are reached. There are an additional four spots for each singles event and three spots for pairs and ice dance at the 2023–24 ISU Junior Grand Prix. Only one quota spot per discipline and NOC can be earned through the 2023–24 ISU Junior Grand Prix series, and only if a NOC does not already have a quota spot for that discipline.

=== Number of entries per discipline ===
Based on the results of the 2023 World Junior Championships and the 2023–24 JGP Final, the following countries earned quota spots.

Event	Athletes per NOC	Men	Women	Pairs	Ice dance
2023 World Junior Championships	2	Japan; Switzerland	Japan; South Korea	—N/a	Czech Republic; South Korea (Note: South Korea only sent one ice dance team.); Canada
2023 World Junior Championships	1	Italy; Canada; South Korea; United States; China; Estonia; Sweden; France; Slovakia; Ukraine	China; Switzerland; United States; Georgia; Canada; France; Estonia; Latvia; Hungary; Cyprus	United States; Australia	Great Britain; United States; France
2023–24 ISU Junior Grand Prix	1	New Zealand; Latvia; Great Britain; Georgia	Chinese Taipei; Finland; Israel; Australia	~~Georgia~~ (Note: This country did not use their quota spot.); Canada	Germany; ~~Israel~~; Ukraine
Reallocation	1	—N/a		Spain	China; Italy
Total		18	18	4	12

=== Summary ===
Country	Men's singles	Women's singles	Pairs	Ice dance	Team event	Total
Australia		1	1			3
Canada	1	1	1	2	Yes	8
China	1	1		1	Yes	4
Chinese Taipei		1				1
Cyprus		1				1
Czech Republic				2		4
Estonia	1	1				2
Finland		1				1
France	1	1		1	Yes	4
Georgia	1	1				2
Germany				1		2
Great Britain	1			1		3
Hungary		1				1
Israel		1				1
Italy	1			1		3
Japan	2	2				4
Latvia	1	1				2
New Zealand	1					1
Slovakia	1					1
South Korea	1	2		1	Yes	5
Spain			1			2
Sweden	1					1
Switzerland	2	1				3
Ukraine	1			1		3
United States	1	1	1	1	Yes	6
Total: 25 NOCs	18	18	4	12	5	68

== Entries ==
Countries began announcing their selections in October 2023. The International Skating Union published a complete list of entries on January 15, 2024.

Entries
Country	Men	Women	Pairs	Ice dance
Australia	—N/a	Sienna Kaczmarczyk	Peyton Bellamy-Martins; Kryshtof Pradeaux	—N/a
Canada	David Li	Kaiya Ruiter	Annika Behnke; Kole Sauve	Caroline Kravets; Jacob Stark
Canada	—N/a			Audra Gans; Michael Boutsan
China	Tian Tonghe	Gao Shiqi	—N/a	Liu Tong; Ge Quanshuo
Chinese Taipei	—N/a	Tsai Yu-Feng	—N/a	
Cyprus	—N/a	Stefania Yakovleva	—N/a	
Czech Republic	—N/a			Andrea Pšurná; Jáchym Novák
Czech Republic	—N/a			Klára Vlčková; Tomáš Vlček
Estonia	Jegor Martsenko	Maria Eliise Kaljuvere	—N/a	
Finland	—N/a	Iida Karhunen	—N/a	
France	Gianni Motilla	Eve Dubecq	—N/a	Ambre Perrier-Gianesini; Samuel Blanc-Klaperman
Georgia	Konstantin Supatashvili	Inga Gurgenidze	—N/a	
Germany	—N/a			Mia Lee Mayer; Davide Calderari
Great Britain	Tao MacRae	—N/a		Ashlie Slatter; Atl Ongay-Perez
Hungary	—N/a	Léna Ekker	—N/a	
Israel	—N/a	Sophia Shifrin	—N/a	
Italy	Raffaele Francesco Zich	—N/a		Zoe Bianchi; Pietro Rota
Japan	Haru Kakiuchi	Mao Shimada	—N/a	
Japan	Rio Nakata	Yo Takagi	—N/a	
Latvia	Kirills Korkačs	Sofja Stepčenko	—N/a	
New Zealand	Li Yanhao	—N/a		
Slovakia	Adam Hagara	—N/a		
South Korea	Kim Hyun-gyeom	Shin Ji-a	—N/a	Kim Jin-ny; Lee Na-mu
South Korea	—N/a	Kim Yu-seong	—N/a	—N/a
Spain	—N/a		Carolina Campillo; Pau Vilella	—N/a
Sweden	Elias Sayed	—N/a		
Switzerland	Aurélian Chervet	Anthea Gradinaru	—N/a	
Switzerland	Georgii Pavlov	—N/a	—N/a	
Ukraine	Vadym Novikov	—N/a		Sofiia Rekunova; Denys Fediankin
United States	Jacob Sanchez	Sherry Zhang	Cayla Smith; Jared McPike	Olivia Ilin; Dylan Cain
