= Iida Karhunen =

Finnish figure skater (born 2008)

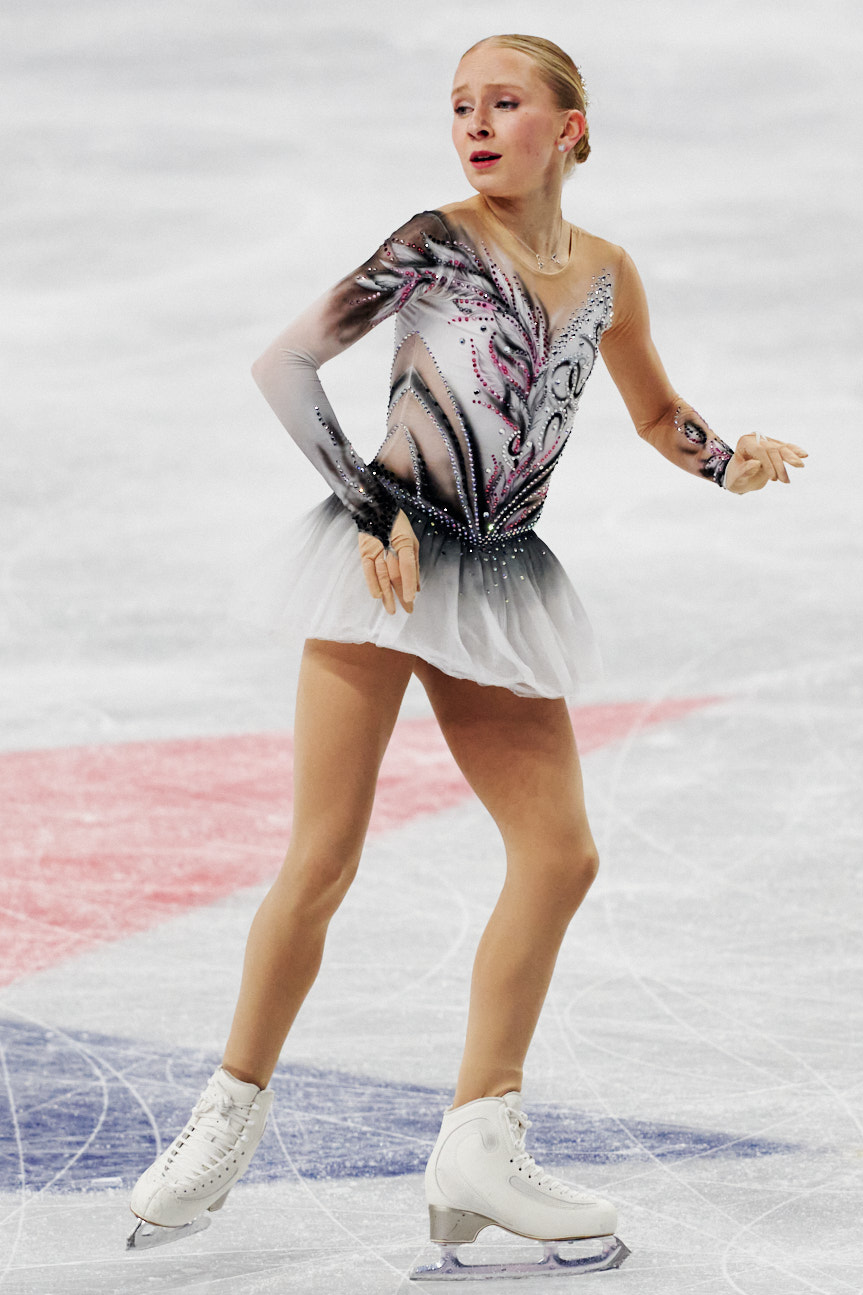
- Karhunen at the 2026 World Championships

Personal information
- Born: 5 April 2008 (age 18) Lappeenranta, Finland
- Home town: Lappeenranta, Finland
- Height: 1.49 m (4 ft 11 in)

Figure skating career
- Country: Finland
- Discipline: Women's singles
- Coach: Marina Shirshova
- Skating club: Lappeenrannan taitoluistelijat
- Began skating: 2010

Medal record
Finnish Championships
Gold medal – first place	2026 Lahti	Singles

Iida Karhunen (born 5 April 2008) is a Finnish figure skater. She is the 2026 Finnish national champion, the 2026 Nordic champion, the 2025 CS Golden Spin of Zagreb silver medalist, and the 56th Volvo Open Cup champion.

At the junior level, she is the 2023 European Youth Olympic Winter Festival champion and a three-time Finnish junior national champion (2023–25).

Karhunen represented Finland at the 2026 Winter Olympics.

== Personal life ==
Karhunen was born on 5 April 2008 in Lappeenranta, Finland. She has two older sisters, Laura and Henna, who are both former competitive figure skaters.

Her figure skating idols include Kaori Sakamoto, Loena Hendrickx, Nathan Chen, and Ilia Malinin.

== Career ==
=== Early years ===
Karhunen began learning how to skate in 2010 at the age of two. Her early coaches included Elina Kutznetsova and Jacek Zylski. Since the age of six or seven, Karhunen has been coached by Marina Shirshova.

She made her international debut at the 2020 Mentor Toruń Cup as an advanced novice skater, winning the silver medal.

=== 2021–22 season: Junior debut ===
Karhunen made her junior international debut at the 2021 Volvo Open Cup, winning the gold medal. She subsequently followed this up with a fifth-place finish at the 2021 Santa Claus Cup. In December, she made her national debut at the 2022 Finnish Junior Championships, winning the bronze medal.

The following month, Karhunen won gold at the 2022 Bavarian Open and silver at the 2022 Nordic Junior Championships. She then closed the season by winning gold at the 2022 Jégvirág Cup.

=== 2022–23 season: First Junior National title ===
Making her Junior Grand Prix series debut, Karhunen finished seventh at the 2022 JGP Poland and ninth at the 2022 JGP Italy. She then went on to win gold at the 2022 Volvo Open Cup and at the 2022 NRW Trophy. In December, she won her first junior national title at the 2023 Finnish Junior Championships.

Assigned to compete at the 2023 European Youth Olympic Winter Festival, Karhunen won the gold medal. She subsequently followed this up by winning gold at the 2023 Nordic Junior Championships.

In late February, Karhunen competed at the 2023 World Junior Championships. She placed twenty-sixth in the short program and did not advance to the free skate segment.

=== 2023–24 season ===
Karhunen started her season by competing on the 2023–24 Junior Grand Prix circuit, placing fifth at 2023 JGP Austria and seventh at the 2023 JGP Hungary. She then went on to win gold at the 2023 Trophée Métropole Nice Côte d'Azur, at the 2023 Volvo Open Cup, and at the 2023 Tallinn Trophy.

In December, she won the junior national title at the Finnish Junior Championships for a second consecutive time.

Selected to compete at the 2024 Winter Youth Olympics in Gangwon, South Korea, Karhunen finished the event in eighth place. She then closed the season by finishing fourth at the 2024 World Junior Championships.

=== 2024–25 season ===
Karhunen began the season by competing on the 2024–25 Junior Grand Prix series, finishing fifth at the 2024 JGP Thailand and seventh at the 2024 JGP Slovenia. She then went on to win silver at the 2024 Volvo Open Cup. A couple weeks later, she competed at the 2024 Tallinn Trophy but withdrew before the free skate. She subsequently competed at the 2024 Bosphorus Cup, finishing in fourth place.

At the 2025 Finnish Junior Championships, Karhunen won the national title for a third time.

In January, she won the gold medal at the 2025 Volvo Open Cup. The following month, Karhunen finished the season by winning gold at the 2025 Nordic Junior Championships and finishing eleventh at the 2025 World Junior Championships.

=== 2025–26 season: Senior debut and Milano Cortina Olympics ===
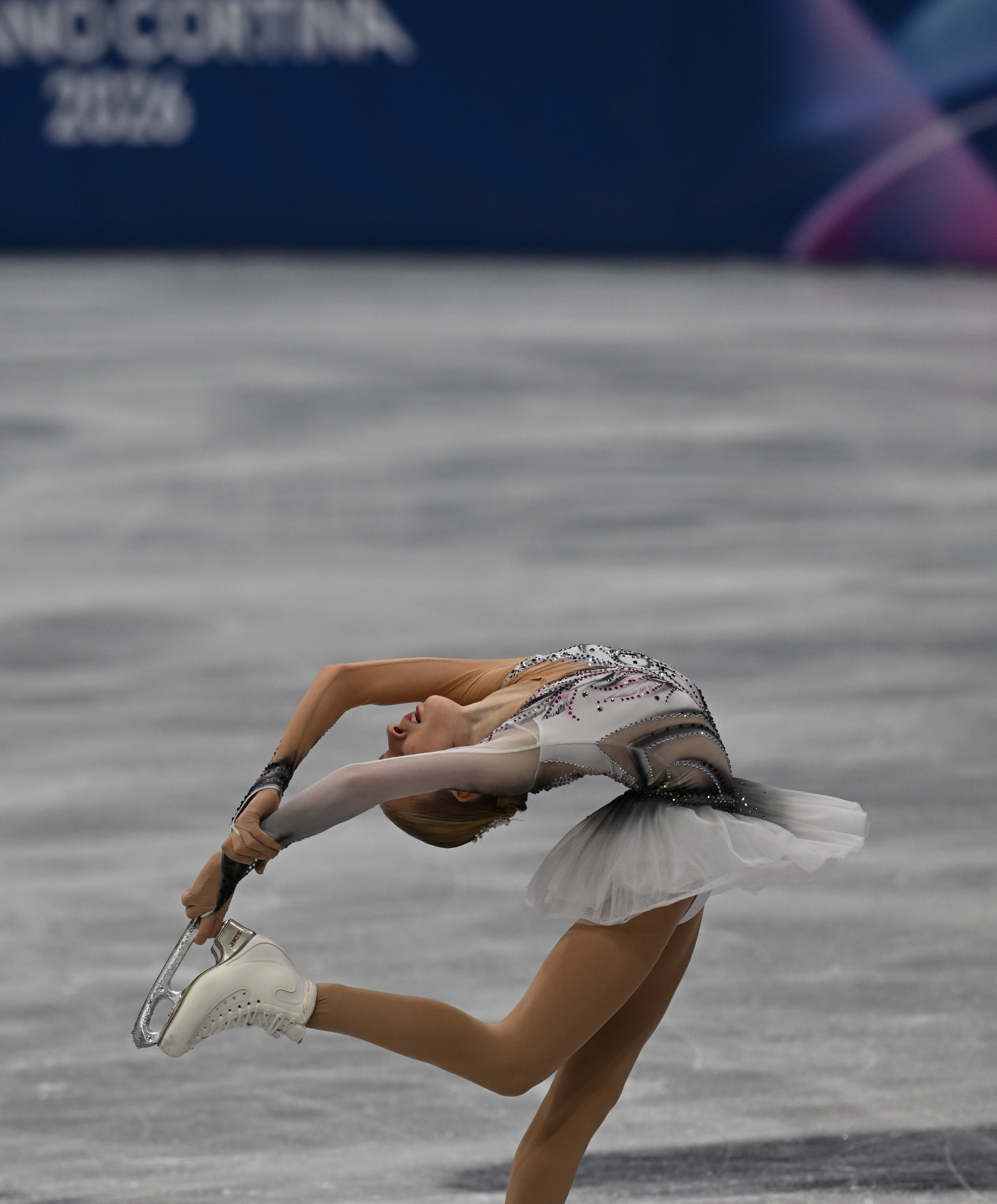
Karhunen performing a layback spin at the 2026 Winter Olympics

Moving up to the senior level, Karhunen opened her season on the 2025–26 ISU Challenger Series circuit, finishing sixth at the 2025 CS Nebelhorn Trophy and eighth at the 2025 CS Trialeti Trophy. She then followed these results up by winning gold at the 2025 Volvo Open Cup.

In late November, she made her senior Grand Prix debut at the 2025 Finlandia Trophy, where she finished in sixth place. A couple weeks later, she won the silver medal at the 2025 CS Golden Spin of Zagreb.

Making her senior national debut at the 2026 Finnish Championships, Karhunen won the gold medal.

Selected to compete at the 2026 European Championships in January, Karhunen placed sixteenth in the short program and seventh in the free skate, finishing tenth overall. "Today I feel very happy," she said following her free skate. "Of course there were some mistakes, but I’m still happy. After the short program, I was very upset, but I think I learned a lot from this competition and it will help me for the future... My family helped me the most after the disappointment. One of my sisters and one of my parents are here, and one sister is back in Finland, but that was very good support." Karhunen was subsequently named to the 2026 Winter Olympic team. The following week, Karhunen won the 2026 Nordic Championships.

Karhunen performing her free program at the 2026 World Championships

On 17 February, Karhunen competed in the short program segment at the 2026 Winter Olympics, finishing in fifteenth place. "I'm feeling very great," she shared after her performance. "It was fun to skate, and I really enjoyed it... I felt really relaxed. I don't know why. I was feeling very chill today. My whole family was there watching, both my sisters and parents." Two days later, she placed seventeenth in the free skate segment and finished in sixteenth place overall, garnering personal best scores in both the short program and the free skate. She was subsequently named as the flag bearer for Finland for the Olympic closing ceremony.

The following month, Karhunen competed at the 2026 World Championships in Prague where she placed fourteenth overall after finishing fourteenth in the short program and thirteenth in the free skate. She described her feelings after the Olympic season: "I’m relieved and happy. It was a little bit of a tough season. My highlight was, of course, the Olympics, but also Nationals, that I was able to perform well there under pressure." She also shared her future plans, "Next week I will rest a little bit, and then I will start working on my new program. I will probably try a new choreographer. I already have some plans, but you will see."

=== 2026–27 season ===
In August, Karhunen announced that she was dealing with a foot injury that had begun to bother her at the World Championships in March, which had affected her summer training, and that her focus for the season would be on the 2027 World Championships as they would be held in Tampere, Finland. In late October, Karhunen announced via her Instagram that she had withdrawn from Skate Canada, in favour of recovering from her injury. She shared, "I was really looking forward to competing and had every intention of being there, we’ve had to accept that I’m not quite ready yet. I’m back to training, but the most important thing right now is to not rush the recovery process or take any unnecessary risks."

== Programs ==
Season	Short program	Free skating	Exhibition
2026–2027	Mira by Zemi; Tout l’univers by Gjon's Tears	"Howl's Moving Castle"; The Boy Who Swallowed a Star; Saliman's Spell - Return to the Castle; Sophie's Castle by Joe Hisaishi; Ending Song (The Promise of the World - Merry-Go-Round of Life) by Chieko Baisho, Joe Hisaishi choreo. by Adam Blake	
2025–2026	Coupure électrique by Britney Spears; Jacquadi by Polo & Pan choreo. by Adam Solya	Swan Lake; Op. 20, Act 1: No.4, Pas de trois - I. Intrada (Allegro); Op. 20, Act 4: No. 28, Allegro agitato - Molto meno mosso - Allegro vivace; Op.20, Act IV: 29. Finale (Andante - Allegro agitato - Alla breve - Moderato e maestoso) by Pyotr Ilyich Tchaikovsky choreo. by Adam Solya	
2024–2025	Le Jazz Hot! (from Victor/Victoria) by Henry Mancini performed by Glee Cast choreo. by Adam Solya	Swan Lake; Op. 20, Act 1: No.4, Pas de trois - I. Intrada (Allegro); Op. 20, Act 4: No. 28, Allegro agitato - Molto meno mosso - Allegro vivace; Op.20, Act IV: 29. Finale (Andante - Allegro agitato - Alla breve - Moderato e maestoso) by Pyotr Ilyich Tchaikovsky choreo. by Adam Solya	
2023–2024	Le Jazz Hot! (from Victor/Victoria) by Henry Mancini performed by Glee Cast choreo. by Adam Solya	Bohemian Rhapsody by Queen choreo. by Anastasia Bunina	Le Jazz Hot! (from Victor/Victoria) by Henry Mancini performed by Glee Cast choreo. by Adam Solya
2022–2023	Winter - Genesis (from The Four Seasons) by Antonio Vivaldi performed by Evgeny Sokolovsky choreo. by Anastasia Bunina	Bohemian Rhapsody by Queen choreo. by Anastasia Bunina	
2021–2022	Winter - Genesis (from The Four Seasons) by Antonio Vivaldi performed by Evgeny Sokolovsky choreo. by Anastasia Bunina	Cats; Overture; The Jellicle Ball; Memory; The Old Gumbie Cat by Andrew Lloyd Webber choreo. by Anastasia Bunina	

== Competitive highlights ==
- GP – Event of the ISU Grand Prix Series
- JGP – Event of the ISU Junior Grand Prix Series
- CS – Event of the ISU Challenger Series
- WD – Withdrew from competition

Competition placements at senior level
Season	2025–26	2026–27
Winter Olympics	16th	
World Championships	14th	
European Championships	10th	
Finnish Championships	1st	
GP Finland	6th	6th
CS Golden Spin of Zagreb	2nd	
CS Nebelhorn Trophy	6th	
CS Trialeti Trophy	8th	
Nordic Championships	1st	
Volvo Open Cup	1st	

Competition placements at junior level
Season	2021–22	2022–23	2023–24	2024–25
Winter Youth Olympics			8th	
World Junior Championships		26th	4th	11th
Finnish Championships	3rd	1st	1st	1st
JGP Austria			5th	
JGP Hungary			7th	
JGP Italy		9th		
JGP Poland		7th		
JGP Slovenia				7th
JGP Thailand				5th
Bavarian Open	1st			
Bosphorus Cup				4th
European Youth Olympic Festival		1st		
Jégvirág Cup	1st			
Nordic Championships	2nd	1st		1st
NRW Trophy		1st		
Santa Claus Cup	5th			
Tallinn Trophy			1st	WD
Trophée Métropole Nice Côte d'Azur			1st	
Volvo Open Cup	1st	1st	1st	2nd
Volvo Open Cup (Note: 53rd Volvo Cup Open)				1st

== Detailed results ==
ISU personal best scores in the +5/-5 GOE System
Segment	Type	Score	Event
Total	TSS	192.79	2026 Winter Olympics
Short program	TSS	66.24	2026 Finlandia Trophy
Short program	TES	36.98	2026 Finlandia Trophy
Short program	PCS	29.26	2026 Finlandia Trophy
Free skating	TSS	127.73	2026 Winter Olympics
Free skating	TES	69.66	2025 CS Golden Spin of Zagreb
Free skating	PCS	59.30	2026 Winter Olympics

=== Senior level ===
Results in the 2025–26 season
Date	Event	SP		FS		Total	
Date	Event	P	Score	P	Score	P	Score
Sep 25–27, 2025	(Germany) 2025 CS Nebelhorn Trophy	8	54.50	5	119.51	6	174.01
Oct 8–11, 2025	(Georgia (country)) 2025 CS Trialeti Trophy	7	56.73	12	105.58	8	162.31
Nov 5–9, 2025	(Latvia) 56th Volvo Open Cup	3	56.69	1	119.58	1	176.27
Nov 21–23, 2025	(Finland) 2025 Finlandia Trophy	9	60.03	6	120.14	6	180.17
Dec 3–6, 2025	(Croatia) 2025 CS Golden Spin of Zagreb	4	60.12	2	126.93	2	187.05
Dec 12–14, 2025	(Finland) 2026 Finnish Championships	1	63.60	1	130.50	1	194.10
Jan 13–18, 2026	(United Kingdom) 2026 European Championships	16	53.73	7	120.76	10	174.49
Jan 28 – Feb 1, 2026	(Denmark) 2026 Nordic Championships	1	64.69	1	128.47	1	193.16
Feb 17–19, 2026	(Italy) 2026 Winter Olympics	15	65.06	17	127.73	16	192.79
Mar 24–29, 2026	(Czech Republic) 2026 World Championships	14	61.40	13	120.04	14	181.44

Results in the 2026–27 season
Date	Event	SP		FS		Total	
Date	Event	P	Score	P	Score	P	Score
Nov 20–22, 2026	(Finland) 2026 Finlandia Trophy	7	66.24	6	120.23	6	184.47

=== Junior level ===
Results in the 2021–22 season
Date	Event	SP		FS		Total	
Date	Event	P	Score	P	Score	P	Score
Nov 3–7, 2021	(Latvia) 44th Volvo Open Cup	3	47.70	1	94.79	1	142.49
Dec 6–12, 2021	(Hungary) 2021 Santa Claus Cup	3	61.44	11	97.09	5	158.53
Dec 17–19, 2021	(Finland) 2022 Finnish Junior Championships	2	55.01	2	95.54	3	150.55
Jan 18–23, 2022	(Germany) 2022 Bavarian Open	1	58.19	2	101.20	1	159.39
Jan 27–30, 2022	(Denmark) 2022 Nordic Junior Championships	2	52.58	1	96.43	2	149.01
Feb 11–13, 2022	(Hungary) 2022 Jégvirág Cup	1	56.21	1	104.57	1	160.78

Results in the 2022–23 season
Date	Event	SP		FS		Total	
Date	Event	P	Score	P	Score	P	Score
Sep 30 – Oct 1, 2022	2022 JGP Poland	9	57.53	6	116.22	7	173.75
Oct 11–15, 2022	2022 JGP Italy	9	55.88	9	104.11	9	159.99
Nov 3–4, 2022	(Latvia) 47th Volvo Open Cup	1	58.96	1	112.90	1	171.86
Nov 24–27, 2022	(Germany) 2022 NRW Trophy	4	48.79	1	103.25	1	152.04
Dec 16–18, 2022	(Finland) 2023 Finnish Junior Championships	1	58.12	1	97.97	1	156.09
Jan 24–26, 2023	(Italy) 2023 European Youth Olympic Winter Festival	1	57.37	1	114.42	1	171.79
Feb 1–5, 2023	(Iceland) 2023 Nordic Junior Championships	1	62.20	1	106.86	1	169.06
Feb 27 – Mar 5, 2023	(Canada) 2024 World Junior Championships	26	47.82	–	–	26	47.82

Results in the 2023–24 season
Date	Event	SP		FS		Total	
Date	Event	P	Score	P	Score	P	Score
Aug 30 – Sep 2, 2023	2023 JGP Austria	4	57.88	5	103.81	5	161.69
Sep 20–23, 2023	2023 JGP Hungary	12	56.01	6	106.54	7	162.55
Oct 18–22, 2023	(France) 2023 Trophée Métropole Nice Côte d'Azur	1	52.96	1	113.05	1	166.01
Nov 2–5, 2023	(Latvia) 50th Volvo Open Cup	1	60.25	1	118.17	1	178.42
Nov 21–24, 2023	(Estonia) 2023 Tallinn Trophy	10	46.29	1	112.81	1	159.10
Dec 15–17, 2023	(Finland) 2024 Finnish Junior Championships	1	57.00	1	110.48	1	167.48
Jan 27 – Feb 1, 2024	(South Korea) 2024 Winter Youth Olympics	11	55.04	7	111.84	8	166.88
Feb 26 – Mar 3, 2024	(Chinese Taipei) 2024 World Junior Championships	4	64.64	4	121.68	4	186.32

Results in the 2024–25 season
Date	Event	SP		FS		Total	
Date	Event	P	Score	P	Score	P	Score
Sep 11–14, 2024	2024 JGP Thailand	4	55.51	8	110.67	5	166.18
Oct 2–5, 2024	2024 JGP Slovenia	7	57.69	9	108.73	7	166.42
Oct 31 – Nov 3, 2024	(Latvia) 52nd Volvo Open Cup	2	58.68	2	115.63	2	174.31
Nov 12–17, 2024	(Estonia) 2024 Tallinn Trophy	1	63.74	–	WD	–	WD
Nov 25 – Dec 1, 2024	(Turkey) 2024 Bosphorus Cup	3	58.19	4	105.05	4	163.24
Dec 13–15, 2024	(Finland) 2025 Finnish Junior Championships	1	61.09	1	105.70	1	166.79
Jan 16–19, 2025	(Latvia) 53rd Volvo Open Cup	1	66.20	1	121.76	1	187.96
Feb 6–9, 2025	(Norway) 2025 Nordic Junior Championships	1	62.78	1	111.92	1	174.70
Feb 24 – Mar 2, 2025	(Hungary) 2025 World Junior Championships	11	60.24	10	116.60	11	176.84
