= Nozomu Yoshioka =

Japanese figure skater (born 2003)

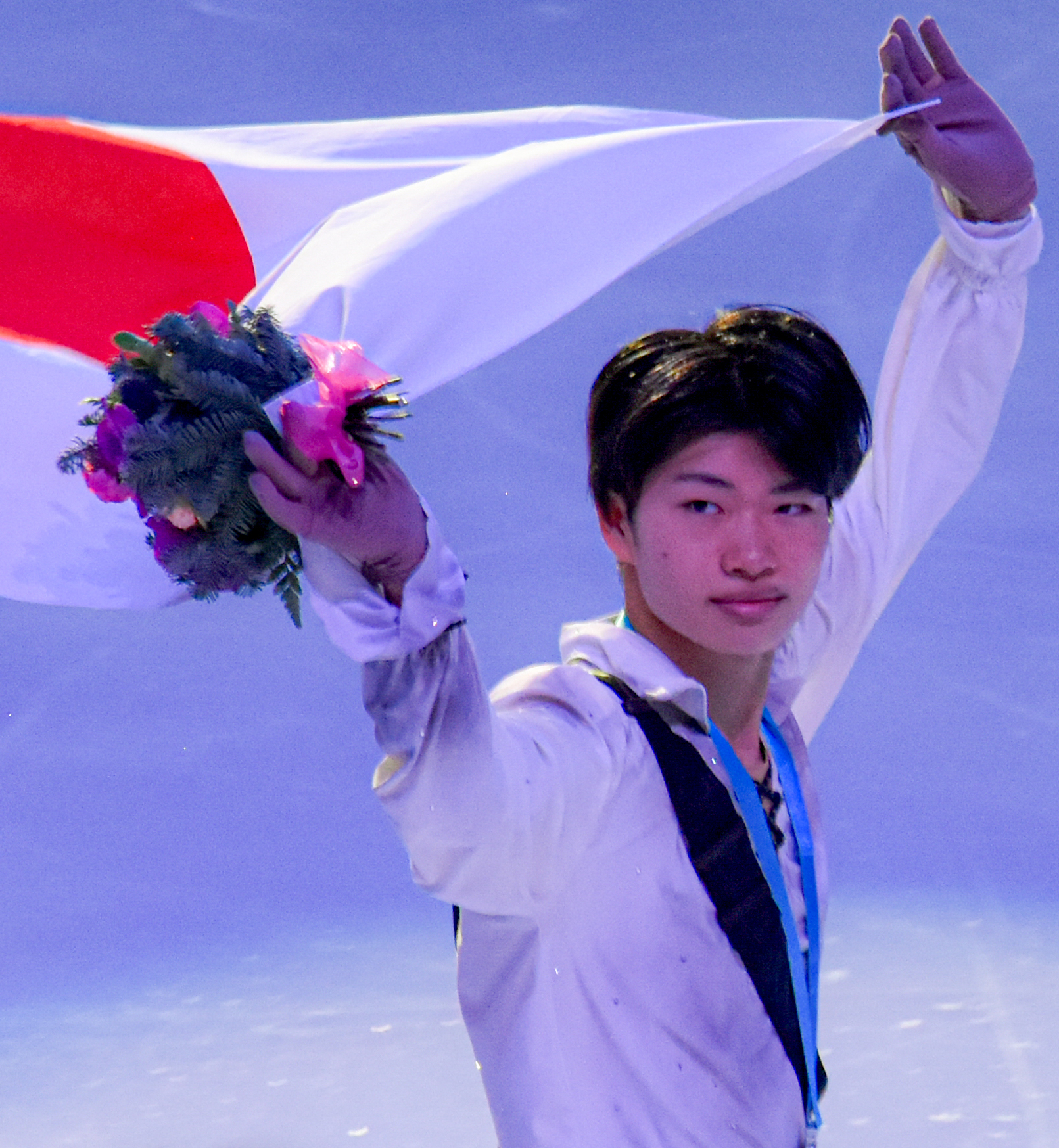
- Yoshioka at the 2022–23 Junior Grand Prix Final

Personal information
- Native name: 吉岡 希
- Other names: Yoshioka Nozomu
- Born: December 15, 2003 (age 22) Osaka, Japan
- Height: 1.68 m (5 ft 6 in)

Figure skating career
- Country: Japan
- Discipline: Men's singles
- Coach: Utako Nagamitsu
- Skating club: Hosei University
- Began skating: 2011

Medal record
World Junior Championships
| Bronze medal – third place | 2023 Calgary | Singles |
Junior Grand Prix Final
| Bronze medal – third place | 2022–23 Turin | Singles |

Nozomu Yoshioka (吉岡 希, Yoshioka Nozomu; born 15 December 2003) is a Japanese figure skater. He is the 2023 World Junior bronze medalist, 2022–23 Junior Grand Prix Final bronze medalist, the 2022 JGP Czech Republic champion, and the 2022 Japanese junior national champion.

== Personal life ==
Yoshioka was born on 15 December 2003 in Osaka, Japan.

As a child, Yoshioka also practiced soccer and martial arts before ultimately deciding to focus on figure skating.

He is currently a student at Hosei University, where he also trains.

Yoshioka's figure skating idol is the late Denis Ten.

== Career ==
=== Early career ===
Yoshioka began figure skating in 2010 after being encouraged by his mother to give it a try.

Throughout his childhood, Yoshioka trained at the Aquapia Skating Rink in Kashiwara, Osaka Prefecture until it closed down. As a result, he relocated to Takatsuki to train at the Kansai University Takatsuki Ice Arena.

He made his junior-level debut at the 2017–18 Japan Junior Championships, where he finished twentieth and then went on to finish twenty-first at the 2018–19 Japan Junior Championships the following year.

=== 2019–20 season ===
Feeling that he needed a training environment that had more "discipline," Yoshioka decided to move to Hyōgo to train at the Hyogo Nishinomiya FSC under Utako Nagamitsu.

After finishing fifth at the 2019–20 Japan Junior Championships, Yoshioka was selected to compete at the 2019–20 Japan Senior Championships where he finished in nineteenth place.

He then went on to compete at the 2020 Challenge Cup as a junior and won the event.

=== 2020–21 season ===
Yoshioka competed at the 2020–21 Japan Junior Championships, finishing eleventh.

Due to the COVID-19 pandemic, a large number of modifications were made to the Grand Prix structure, where competitors consisted only of skaters from the home country, skaters already training in the host nation, and skaters assigned to that event for geographic reasons. As a result, Yoshioka was invited to compete at the 2020 NHK Trophy where he finished tenth.

=== 2021–22 season ===
Yoshioka competed at the 2021–22 Japan Junior Championships, where he won the bronze medal and was thus invited to compete at the 2021–22 Japan Senior Championships, where he finished twentieth.

=== 2022–23 season ===
Making his debut on the 2022–23 Junior Grand Prix series, Yoshioka won the gold medal at the 2022 JGP Czech Republic and placed fifth at the 2022 JGP Poland I. These results secured a spot for Yoshioka at the 2022–23 Junior Grand Prix Final in Turin, Italy.

Yoshioka then went on to compete at the 2022–23 Japan Junior Championships, where he won the gold medal.

At the 2022–23 Junior Grand Prix Final, Yoshioka placed fifth in the short program after losing points on a spin and having two jump errors in the program. However, Yoshioka managed to skate a more solid free skate, placing second in that segment of the competition and winning the bronze medal overall. Following the event, Yoshioka said, "I'm happy that I was able to stand on the stage (of the final). I was able to complete the free skate with the minimum number of mistakes."

At the 2022–23 Japan Championships, Yoshioka finished tenth.

Yoshioka was selected to compete at the 2023 World Junior Championships in Calgary, Alberta. He placed seventh in the short program, scoring a new personal best score and managed to place second in the free skate, winning the bronze medal overall.

Additionally, he was invited to skate in the gala at the 2023 World Championships in Saitama.

Yoshioka closed his season with a gold medal at the 2023 Triglav Trophy.

=== 2023–24 season ===
Yoshioka began the season by finishing fifth at the 2023 CS Lombardia Trophy. Appearing on the Grand Prix at the 2023 Skate America, he set a new personal best in the short program (87.44) to come fourth in the segment. He dropped to sixth after the free skate. He said he was "disappointed" with the second half of the free skate, but said it was a "huge bonus" to be invited to the event.

He went on to finish eighth at the 2023–24 Japan Championships, before ending his season with a silver medal at the 2024 Tallink Hotels Cup.

=== 2024–25 season ===
Yoshioka started the season by winning bronze at the 2024 Asian Open Trophy. He then went on to compete on the 2024–25 Grand Prix series, finishing eighth at 2024 Skate America.

In December, he finished twenty-second at the 2024–25 Japan Championships.

=== 2025–26 season ===
Yoshioka competed at the 2025–26 Japan Championships, where he finished in eighth place.

== Programs ==
| Season | Short program | Free skating | Exhibition |
|---|---|---|---|
| 2025–2026 | The Loneliest by Måneskin choreo. by Lori Nichol | Felix Tango by Luca Lucini, Mario Stefano, & M. Falloni; Il Postino by Luis Bacalov; Mi Mancherai performed by Josh Groban & Joshua Bell choreo. by Lori Nichol | |
| 2024–2025 | Lullaby for Sadness by Eternal Eclipse; Fate of the Clockmaker by Eternal Eclipse and Flynn Hase Spence choreo. by Lori Nichol | Felix Tango by Luca Lucini, Mario Stefano, & M. Falloni; Il Postino by Luis Bacalov; Mi Mancherai performed by Josh Groban & Joshua Bell choreo. by Lori Nichol | |
| 2023–2024 | Lullaby for Sadness by Eternal Eclipse; Fate of the Clockmaker by Eternal Eclipse and Flynn Hase Spence choreo. by Lori Nichol | Pirates of the Caribbean by Hans Zimmer, Klaus Badelt, and Geoff Zanelli choreo. by Kohei Yoshino; Final Fantasy by Nobuo Uematsu choreo. by Kohei Yoshino | |
| 2022–2023 | Malagueña by Ernesto Lecuona performed by Stanley Black and His Orchestra choreo. by Kenji Miyamoto | Pirates of the Caribbean by Hans Zimmer, Klaus Badelt, and Geoff Zanelli choreo. by Kohei Yoshino | Mountain Top (from Legend of the Demon Cat) by Yojiro Noda performed by RADWIMPS choreo. by Kohei Yoshino |
| 2021–2022 | Mountain Top (from Legend of the Demon Cat) by Yojiro Noda performed by RADWIMPS choreo. by Kohei Yoshino | Rhapsody in Blue by George Gershwin choreo. by Misao Sato | |
| 2020–2021 | Mountain Top (from Legend of the Demon Cat) by Yojiro Noda performed by RADWIMPS choreo. by Kohei Yoshino | Lorelei by Naoki Sato choreo. by Mari Araya | |
| 2019–2020 | Art on Ice by Edvin Marton choreo. by Kohei Yoshino | Lorelei by Naoki Sato choreo. by Mari Araya | |

== Competitive highlights ==
- GP – Event of the ISU Grand Prix Series
- JGP – Event of the ISU Junior Grand Prix Series
- CS – Event of the ISU Challenger Series
- TBD – Assigned
- WD – Withdrew from competition

Competition placements at senior level
| Season | 2019–20 | 2020–21 | 2021–22 | 2022–23 | 2023–24 | 2024–25 | 2025–26 |
|---|---|---|---|---|---|---|---|
| Japan Championships | 19th | | 20th | 10th | 8th | 22nd | 8th |
| GP NHK Trophy | | 10th | | | | | |
| GP Skate America | | | | | 6th | 8th | |
| CS Lombardia Trophy | | | | | 5th | | |
| Asian Open Trophy | | | | | | 3rd | |
| Coupe du Printemps | | | | | | | 3rd |
| Tallink Hotels Cup | | | | | 2nd | | |
| Triglav Trophy | | | | 1st | | | |

Competition placements at junior level
| Season | 2017–18 | 2018–19 | 2019–20 | 2020–21 | 2021–22 | 2022–23 |
|---|---|---|---|---|---|---|
| World Junior Championships | | | | | | 3rd |
| Junior Grand Prix Final | | | | | | 3rd |
| Japan Championships | 20th | 21st | 5th | 11th | 3rd | 1st |
| JGP Czech Republic | | | | | | 1st |
| JGP Poland | | | | | | 5th |
| Challenge Cup | | | 1st | | | |
| Egna Spring Trophy | | | | | 3rd | |

== Detailed results ==
ISU personal best scores in the +5/-5 GOE System
| Segment | Type | Score | Event |
|---|---|---|---|
| Total | TSS | 233.56 | 2023 Skate America |
| Short program | TSS | 87.44 | 2023 Skate America |
| Short program | TES | 48.95 | 2023 Skate America |
| Short program | PCS | 38.49 | 2023 Skate America |
| Free skating | TSS | 147.65 | 2022 JGP Czech Republic |
| Free skating | TES | 76.84 | 2022–23 Junior Grand Prix Final |
| Free skating | PCS | 75.66 | 2023 Skate America |

=== Senior level ===
Results in the 2019–20 season
| Date | Event | SP | | FS | | Total | |
| Date | Event | P | Score | P | Score | P | Score |
|---|---|---|---|---|---|---|---|
| Dec 18–22, 2019 | 2019–20 Japan Championships | 16 | 64.56 | 20 | 116.06 | 19 | 180.62 |

Results in the 2020–21 season
| Date | Event | SP | | FS | | Total | |
| Date | Event | P | Score | P | Score | P | Score |
|---|---|---|---|---|---|---|---|
| Nov 27–29, 2020 | (Japan) 2020 NHK Trophy | 10 | 55.88 | 10 | 108.82 | 10 | 164.70 |

Results in the 2021–22 season
| Date | Event | SP | | FS | | Total | |
| Date | Event | P | Score | P | Score | P | Score |
|---|---|---|---|---|---|---|---|
| Dec 22–26, 2021 | 2021–22 Japan Championships | 14 | 72.94 | 24 | 97.63 | 20 | 170.57 |

Results in the 2022–23 season
| Date | Event | SP | | FS | | Total | |
| Date | Event | P | Score | P | Score | P | Score |
|---|---|---|---|---|---|---|---|
| Dec 21–25, 2022 | 2022–23 Japan Championships | 7 | 80.85 | 11 | 139.58 | 10 | 220.43 |
| Apr 13–16, 2023 | (Slovenia) 2023 Triglav Trophy | 1 | 82.42 | 1 | 155.94 | 1 | 238.36 |

Results in the 2023–24 season
| Date | Event | SP | | FS | | Total | |
| Date | Event | P | Score | P | Score | P | Score |
|---|---|---|---|---|---|---|---|
| Sep 8–10, 2023 | (Italy) 2023 CS Lombardia Trophy | 4 | 70.07 | 5 | 140.39 | 5 | 210.46 |
| Oct 20–22, 2023 | (United States) 2023 Skate America | 4 | 87.44 | 7 | 146.12 | 6 | 233.56 |
| Dec 20–24, 2023 | 2023–24 Japan Championships | 8 | 85.27 | 8 | 164.11 | 8 | 249.38 |
| Feb 15–18, 2024 | (Estonia) 2024 Tallink Hotels Trophy | 2 | 78.02 | 2 | 141.96 | 2 | 219.98 |

Results in the 2024–25 season
| Date | Event | SP | | FS | | Total | |
| Date | Event | P | Score | P | Score | P | Score |
|---|---|---|---|---|---|---|---|
| Sep 2–6, 2024 | (Hong Kong) 2024 Asian Open Trophy | 6 | 69.42 | 2 | 149.46 | 3 | 218.88 |
| Oct 18–20, 2024 | (United States) 2024 Skate America | 7 | 80.79 | 11 | 135.13 | 8 | 215.92 |
| Dec 19–22, 2024 | 2024–25 Japan Championships | 21 | 63.76 | 22 | 117.53 | 22 | 181.29 |

Results in the 2025–26 season
| Date | Event | SP | | FS | | Total | |
| Date | Event | P | Score | P | Score | P | Score |
|---|---|---|---|---|---|---|---|
| Dec 18–21, 2025 | 2025–26 Japan Championships | 9 | 75.42 | 10 | 139.17 | 8 | 214.59 |
| Mar 13–15, 2026 | (Luxembourg) 2026 Coupe du Printemps | 1 | 79.98 | 3 | 138.52 | 3 | 218.50 |

=== Junior level ===
Results in the 2017–18 season
| Date | Event | SP | | FS | | Total | |
| Date | Event | P | Score | P | Score | P | Score |
|---|---|---|---|---|---|---|---|
| Nov 24–26, 2017 | 2017–18 Japan Championships (Junior) | 23 | 41.82 | 19 | 89.70 | 20 | 131.52 |

Results in the 2018–19 season
| Date | Event | SP | | FS | | Total | |
| Date | Event | P | Score | P | Score | P | Score |
|---|---|---|---|---|---|---|---|
| Nov 23–25, 2018 | 2018–19 Japan Championships (Junior) | 21 | 47.43 | 21 | 89.80 | 21 | 137.23 |

Results in the 2019–20 season
| Date | Event | SP | | FS | | Total | |
| Date | Event | P | Score | P | Score | P | Score |
|---|---|---|---|---|---|---|---|
| Nov 15–17, 2019 | 2019–20 Japan Championships (Junior) | 9 | 61.98 | 5 | 122.37 | 5 | 184.35 |
| Feb 20–23, 2020 | (Netherlands) 2020 International Challenge Cup | 1 | 70.92 | 1 | 130.76 | 1 | 201.68 |

Results in the 2020–21 season
| Date | Event | SP | | FS | | Total | |
| Date | Event | P | Score | P | Score | P | Score |
|---|---|---|---|---|---|---|---|
| Nov 21–23, 2020 | 2020–21 Japan Championships (Junior) | 9 | 64.75 | 11 | 104.13 | 11 | 168.88 |

Results in the 2021–22 season
| Date | Event | SP | | FS | | Total | |
| Date | Event | P | Score | P | Score | P | Score |
|---|---|---|---|---|---|---|---|
| Nov 19–21, 2021 | 2021–22 Japan Championships (Junior) | 2 | 68.55 | 3 | 123.25 | 3 | 191.80 |
| Apr 7–10, 2022 | (Italy) 2022 Egna Spring Trophy | 3 | 67.82 | 4 | 119.54 | 3 | 187.36 |

Results in the 2022–23 season
| Date | Event | SP | | FS | | Total | |
| Date | Event | P | Score | P | Score | P | Score |
|---|---|---|---|---|---|---|---|
| Aug 31 – Sep 3, 2022 | 2022 JGP Czech Republic | 2 | 72.03 | 1 | 147.65 | 1 | 219.68 |
| Sep 28 – Oct 1, 2022 | 2022 JGP Poland I | 4 | 69.97 | 6 | 124.66 | 5 | 194.63 |
| Nov 25–27, 2022 | 2022–23 Japan Championships (Junior) | 2 | 71.84 | 2 | 137.73 | 1 | 209.57 |
| Dec 8–11, 2022 | (Italy) 2022–23 Junior Grand Prix Final | 5 | 66.83 | 2 | 141.18 | 3 | 208.01 |
| Feb 27 – Mar 5, 2023 | (Canada) 2023 World Junior Championships | 7 | 76.44 | 2 | 141.35 | 3 | 217.79 |
