= Yo Takagi =

Japanese figure skater (born 2007)

Personal information
- Native name: 髙木 謠
- Born: December 15, 2007 (age 18) Tokyo, Japan
- Home town: Funabashi, Chiba Prefecture, Japan
- Height: 1.56 m (5 ft 1 in)

Figure skating career
- Country: Japan
- Coach: Kensuke Nakaniwa; Makoto Nakata; Momoe Nagumo; Aya Tanoue; Niina Takeno
- Skating club: Tokyo Joshi Gakuin
- Began skating: 2012

Medal record
Winter Youth Olympics
| Bronze medal – third place | 2024 Gangwon | Singles |

Yo Takagi (髙木 謠, Takagi Yo; born December 15, 2007) is a Japanese figure skater. She is the 2024 Youth Olympic bronze medalist, the 2024 JGP Thailand silver medalist, the 2023 JGP Japan silver medalist, and 2023 Coupe du Printemps junior silver medalist.

== Personal life ==
Takagi was born on December 15, 2007, in Tokyo, Japan.

She is currently a student at Tokyo Joshi Gakuin Senior High School.

== Career ==
=== Early career ===
Takagi began skating in 2012. She originally trained at the Meiji Jingu Gaien Figure Skating Club in Tokyo before relocating to Funabashi, Chiba Prefecture to train at the MF Figure Skating Academy following its opening in 2021. There, Kensuke Nakaniwa, Makoto Nakata, Momoe Nagumo, Aya Tanoue, and Akane Seo became her coaches.

She made her debut at the 2021–22 Japan Junior National Championships, finishing tenth.

The following season, Takagi finished seventh at the 2022–23 Japan Junior Championships. Due to this top eight finish, she was selected to compete at the 2022–23 Japan Senior Championships. She would ultimately place twenty-first at those championships.

Takagi then made her international debut at the 2023 Coupe du Printemps in Luxembourg, where she won the silver medal on the junior level behind teammate, Ami Nakai.

=== 2023–24 season ===
Takagi began the season by debuting on the Junior Grand Prix circuit. She finished fourth at 2023 JGP Thailand before going on to compete at 2023 JGP Japan, winning the silver medal behind Mao Shimada. Following the event, Takagi said, "I'm happy because I didn't think I would get a personal best. I learned that I was able to persevere and not give up even when I failed." With these results, Takagi was named as the first alternate to the Junior Grand Prix Final.

Competing at the 2023–24 Japan Junior Championships, Takagi finished fourth. With this result, combined with her placements on the Junior Grand Prix series, Takagi was selected to represent Japan at the 2024 Winter Youth Olympics and named as Japan's first alternate to compete at the 2024 World Junior Championships. She was also selected to compete at the 2023–24 Japan Senior Championships due to her top eight finish at the junior championships. At the senior championships, Takagi finished twenty-third.

Competing at the 2024 Youth Olympics, Takagi scored a personal best in the short program, finishing second in that segment of the competition behind Shimada, and narrowly ahead of South Korean Shin Ji-a. In the free skate, she landed four clean triple jumps, having singled a planned triple lutz, and finished fifth in the segment. However, she maintained a podium placement, winning the bronze medal behind Shimada and Shin.

=== 2024–25 season ===
Competing on the Junior Grand Prix circuit, Takagi started the season by winning silver at 2024 JGP Thailand and finishing fifth at 2024 JGP China.

In late November, Takagi competed at the 2024–25 Japan Junior Championships, where she came in fourteenth place.

=== 2025–26 season ===
Takagi began the season by competing on the Junior Grand Prix series, finishing seventh at 2025 JGP Latvia.

In late November, she competed at the 2025–26 Japan Junior Championships and finished in eleventh place. With this result, she was invited to compete at the senior national championships, where she finished in seventeenth place.

== Programs ==
| Season | Short program | Free skating | Exhibition |
|---|---|---|---|
| 2026–2027 | | | Goddess by Laufey choreo. by Grayson Long |
| 2025–2026 | As Long as You're There (from Glee) performed by Jake Zyrus choreo. by Kenji Miyamoto | Prelude, Op.28: No. 4 in E Minor by Frédéric Chopin performed by Grigory Sokolov; Get What U Get by Chloe Flower choreo. by Shin Yea-ji | |
| 2024–2025 | The Voice by Celtic Woman, Irish Film Orchestra, John Page, Brendan Graham, & David Downes choreo. by Akiko Suzuki | Prelude, Op.28: No. 4 in E Minor by Frédéric Chopin performed by Grigory Sokolov; Get What U Get by Chloe Flower choreo. by Shin Yea-ji | Sous le ciel de Paris; Milord performed by Édith Piaf choreo. by Akiko Suzuki |
| 2023–2024 | Sous le ciel de Paris; Milord performed by Édith Piaf choreo. by Akiko Suzuki | The Mission; Falls; The Mission; Ascunsion by Ennio Morricone; Gabriel's Oboe performed by Hayley Westenra choreo. by Kenji Miyamoto | |
| 2022–2023 | Sous le ciel de Paris; Milord performed by Édith Piaf choreo. by Akiko Suzuki | The Mask of Zorro by James Horner choreo. by Kenji Miyamoto | |
| 2021–2022 | Once Upon a December (from Anastasia) performed by Christy Altomare choreo. by Kenji Miyamoto | The Mask of Zorro by James Horner choreo. by Kenji Miyamoto | |

== Competitive highlights ==
- JGP – Event of the ISU Grand Prix Series
- TBD – Assigned
- WD – Withdrew from competition

Competition placements at senior level
| Season | 2022–23 | 2023–24 | 2025–26 |
|---|---|---|---|
| Japan Championships | 21st | 23rd | 17th |

Competition placements at junior level
| Season | 2021–22 | 2022–23 | 2023–24 | 2024–25 | 2025–26 |
|---|---|---|---|---|---|
| Winter Youth Olympics | | | 3rd | | |
| Japan Championships | 10th | 7th | 4th | 14th | 11th |
| JGP China | | | | 5th | |
| JGP Japan | | | 2nd | | |
| JGP Latvia | | | | | 7th |
| JGP Thailand | | | 4th | 2nd | |
| Coupe du Printemps | | 2nd | | | |

== Detailed results ==
ISU personal best scores in the +5/-5 GOE System
| Segment | Type | Score | Event |
|---|---|---|---|
| Total | **TSS** | **188.54** | 2024 JGP Thailand |
| Short program | **TSS** | **67.23** | 2024 Winter Youth Olympics |
| Short program | TES | 37.67 | 2024 Winter Youth Olympics |
| Short program | PCS | 29.56 | 2024 Winter Youth Olympics |
| Free skating | **TSS** | **124.73** | 2023 JGP Japan |
| Free skating | TES | 63.93 | 2024 JGP Thailand |
| Free skating | PCS | 60.94 | 2023 JGP Japan |

Current personal best scores are highlighted in bold.

Small medals for short and free programs awarded only at ISU Championships.

=== Senior level ===
Results in the 2022-23 season
| Date | Event | SP | | FS | | Total | |
| Date | Event | P | Score | P | Score | P | Score |
|---|---|---|---|---|---|---|---|
| Dec 21–25, 2022 | 2022–23 Japan Championships | 16 | 58.87 | 22 | 99.99 | 21 | 158.86 |

Results in the 2023-24 season
| Date | Event | SP | | FS | | Total | |
| Date | Event | P | Score | P | Score | P | Score |
|---|---|---|---|---|---|---|---|
| Dec 20–24, 2023 | 2023–24 Japan Championships | 20 | 55.09 | 23 | 93.30 | 23 | 148.39 |

Results in the 2025–26 season
| Date | Event | SP | | FS | | Total | |
| Date | Event | P | Score | P | Score | P | Score |
|---|---|---|---|---|---|---|---|
| Dec 18–21, 2025 | 2025–26 Japan Championships | 15 | 61.62 | 17 | 118.11 | 17 | 179.93 |

=== Junior level ===
2025–26 season
| Date | Event | SP | FS | Total |
|---|---|---|---|---|
| November 22–24, 2025 | 2025–26 Japan Junior Championships | 5; 61.32 | 15; 99.51 | 11; 160.83 |
| August 20–23, 2025 | 2025 JGP Latvia | 4; 63.18 | 9; 106.97 | 7; 170.15 |
2024–25 season
| Date | Event | SP | FS | Total |
| November 15–17, 2024 | 2024–25 Japan Junior Championships | 14; 52.82 | 11; 107.66 | 14; 160.48 |
| October 9–12, 2024 | 2024 JGP China | 2; 66.03 | 7; 119.42 | 5; 185.45 |
| September 11–14, 2024 | 2024 JGP Thailand | 2; 64.99 | 2; 123.55 | 2; **188.54** |
2023–24 season
| Date | Event | SP | FS | Total |
| January 28–30, 2024 | 2024 Winter Youth Olympics | 2; **67.23** | 5; 115.97 | 3; 183.20 |
| November 17–19, 2023 | 2023–24 Japan Junior Championships | 3; 63.62 | 4; 120.34 | 4; 183.96 |
| November 2–5, 2023 | 2023 Japan Eastern Sectional Championships | 1; 64.81 | 1; 110.80 | 1; 175.61 |
| September 13–16, 2023 | 2023 JGP Japan | 2; 63.42 | 2; **124.73** | 2; 188.15 |
| August 23–26, 2023 | 2023 JGP Thailand | 4; 58.30 | 4; 113.31 | 4; 171.61 |
2022–23 season
| Date | Event | SP | FS | Total |
| March 17–19, 2023 | 2023 Coupe du Printemps | 4; 56.03 | 2; 123.75 | 2; 179.78 |
| November 25–27, 2022 | 2022–23 Japan Junior Championships | 6; 61.44 | 8; 104.63 | 7; 166.07 |
| November 3–6, 2022 | 2022 Japan Eastern Sectional Championships | 4; 60.29 | 4; 108.42 | 3; 168.71 |
| September 29–October 2, 2022 | 2022 Tokyo Regional Championships | 2; 54.22 | 3; 97.98 | 2; 152.20 |
2021–22 season
| Date | Event | SP | FS | Total |
| November 19–21, 2021 | 2021–22 Japan Junior Championships | 11; 55.84 | 10; 102.74 | 10; 158.58 |
| October 28–31, 2021 | 2021 Japan Eastern Sectional Championships | 5; 52.25 | 4; 100.04 | 5; 152.29 |
| October 7–10, 2021 | 2021 Tokyo Regional Championships | 4; 52.44 | 3; 90.04 | 3; 142.48 |

=== Novice level ===
2020–21 season
| Date | Event | FS | Total |
|---|---|---|---|
| October 24–25, 2020 | 2020–21 Japan Novice A Championships | 11; 82.85 | 11; 82.85 |
| October 9–11, 2020 | 2020 Tokyo Regional Championships | 1; 80.84 | 1; 80.84 |
2019–20 season
| Date | Event | FS | Total |
| October 18–20, 2019 | 2019–20 Japan Novice A Championships | 6; 78.67 | 6; 78.67 |
| September 20–23, 2019 | 2020 Tokyo Regional Championships | 2; 86.64 | 2; 86.64 |
