= Israel at the 2024 Winter Youth Olympics =

- Flag of Israel
- IOC code: ISR
- NOC: Olympic Committee of Israel

in Gangwon, South Korea 19 January 2024 – 1 February 2024
- Competitors: 1 in 1 sport
- Flag bearer (opening): Volunteer
- Flag bearer (closing): Sophia Shifrin
- Medals: Gold 0 Silver 0 Bronze 0 Total 0

Winter Youth Olympics appearances (overview)
- 2016; 2020; 2024

Israel is scheduled to compete at the 2024 Winter Youth Olympics in Gangwon, South Korea, from January 19 to February 1, 2024, This will be Israel's third consecutive appearance at the Winter Youth Olympic Games, having debuted at the second edition in 2016.

The Israeli team consisted of one female figure skater. A volunteer was the country's flagbearer during the opening ceremony.

== Competitors ==
The following is the list of number of competitors (per gender) participating at the games per sport/discipline.

Sport	Men	Women	Total
Figure skating	0	1	1
Total	0	1	1

== Figure skating ==
Israeli figure skater Sophia Shifrin achieved quota places for the Junior Women Skating event and Israeli ice dancers Elizabeth Tkachenko and Alexei Kiliakov achieved quota places for the Junior Ice Dance event for Israel based on the position of the 2023–24 ISU Junior Grand Prix. Israel later declined the quota in the ice dance event.

Athletes	Event	SP/SD		FS/FD		Total	
Athletes	Event	Points	Rank	Points	Rank	Points	Rank
Sophia Shifrin	Women's singles	49.54	12	103.00	10	152.54	12

== See also ==
- Israel at the 2024 Summer Olympics
