= Cyprus at the 2020 Winter Youth Olympics =

- IOC code: CYP
- NOC: Cyprus Olympic Committee
- Website: www.olympic.org.cy

in Lausanne
- Competitors: 1 in 1 sport
- Flag bearer: Georgia Epiphaniou
- Medals: Gold 0 Silver 0 Bronze 0 Total 0

Winter Youth Olympics appearances
- 2012; 2016; 2020; 2024

Cyprus competed at the 2020 Winter Youth Olympics in Lausanne, Switzerland from 9 to 22 January 2020.

== Alpine skiing ==
Girls

Athlete	Event	Run 1		Run 2		Total	
Athlete	Event	Time	Rank	Time	Rank	Time	Rank
Georgia Epiphaniou	Giant slalom	1:23.88	50	1:23.40	35	2:47.28	35
Georgia Epiphaniou	Slalom	DNF					

== See also ==
- Cyprus at the 2020 Summer Olympics
