= 2022–23 ISU Junior Grand Prix =

- Type: ISU Junior Grand Prix
- Date: August 24 – December 11, 2022
- Season: 2022–23
- Previous: 2021–22 ISU Junior Grand Prix
- Next: 2023–24 ISU Junior Grand Prix

The 2022–23 ISU Junior Grand Prix was a series of junior international competitions organized by the International Skating Union that were held from August 2022 through December 2022. It was the junior-level complement to the 2022–23 ISU Grand Prix of Figure Skating. Medals were awarded in men's singles, women's singles, pair skating, and ice dance. Skaters earned points based on their placement at each event and the top six in each discipline qualified to compete at the 2022–23 Junior Grand Prix Final in Turin, Italy.

== Competitions ==
The locations of the JGP events change yearly. The Armenian Skating Federation was originally scheduled to host the fourth JGP event in Yerevan, but cancelled the event due to the Azerbaijani invasion of Armenia. The ISU Council therefore decided to reallocate the competitors' entries to the next upcoming three Junior Grand Prix events in Poland and Italy.

The Croatian Skating Federation was scheduled to host the fifth JGP event in Zagreb, but cancelled the event due to logistical reasons. The Fédération Française des Sports de Glace initially volunteered to host two separate JGP events. However, on July 29, 2022, the ISU announced that France would no longer host the event in Grenoble as planned. The event was reallocated to the Polish Figure Skating Association, which hosted two back-to-back JGP events in Gdańsk.

This season, the series was composed of the following events.

Date	Event	Location	Notes	Results
August 24–27	2022 JGP France	Courchevel, France	No pairs	Details
August 31 – September 3	2022 JGP Czech Republic	Ostrava, Czech Republic		Details
September 7–10	2022 JGP Latvia	Riga, Latvia		Details
September 21–24	2022 JGP Armenia	Cancelled		
September 28 – October 1	2022 JGP Poland I	Gdańsk, Poland		Details
October 5–8	2022 JGP Poland II	Gdańsk, Poland		Details
October 12–15	2022 JGP Italy	Egna, Italy	No pairs	Details
December 8–11	(Italy) 2022–23 JGP Final	Turin, Italy		Details

== Entries ==
Skaters who reached the age of 13 before July 1, 2022, but had not turned 19 (singles skaters and female pairs or ice dance skaters) or 21 (male pairs or ice dance skaters) were eligible to compete on the junior circuit. Competitors were chosen by their countries according to their federations' selection procedures. The number of entries allotted to each ISU member federation was determined by their skaters' placements at the 2022 World Junior Championships in each discipline.

=== Number of entries per discipline ===
Based on the results of the 2022 World Junior Championships, each ISU member nation was allowed to field the following number of entries per event.

Singles and ice dance
Entries	Men	Women	Ice dance
Two entries in seven events	United States; Kazakhstan; Japan	United States; South Korea; Switzerland	United States; Canada; Germany
One entry in seven events	Canada; Estonia; Italy	Japan; Estonia; Belgium	South Korea; Cyprus; France
One entry in six events	Switzerland; Sweden; Czech Republic; Israel	Finland; Italy; Canada; Poland	Great Britain; Japan; Israel; Poland
One entry in five events	France; South Korea; Great Britain; Slovakia; Georgia; Germany; Poland	France; Czech Republic; Sweden; Israel; Netherlands; Philippines; Germany; Lithuania	Estonia; Italy; Ukraine; Slovakia; Switzerland; Georgia
One entry in four events	Armenia; Finland; Hungary; Turkey; Spain	Hungary; Latvia; Bulgaria; Denmark; Kazakhstan; Australia	Czech Republic; Turkey; Austria; Hungary
One entry in three events	Bulgaria; Slovenia; Ukraine	Slovenia; Hong Kong; Turkey; Slovakia; Great Britain; Norway; Ukraine; Cyprus; Austria; Croatia; Romania; Mexico	—N/a

- If not listed above, one entry in two events is allowed.
- Host federations may enter up to three spots per discipline.

Pairs
Entries	Pairs
Three entries in four events	Georgia; Australia; Canada; United States
Two entries in four events	Germany; Ukraine; Italy; Czech Republic; France

- If not listed above, one entry in three events is allowed.
- Host federations have an unlimited number of entries.

== Medal summary ==
=== Men's singles ===
Competition	Gold	Silver	Bronze	Results
JGP France	(Japan) Shunsuke Nakamura	(South Korea) Cha Young-hyun	(Japan) Ryoga Morimoto	Details
JGP Czech Republic	(Japan) Nozomu Yoshioka	(Italy) Nikolaj Memola	(Sweden) Andreas Nordebäck	Details
JGP Latvia	(Italy) Nikolaj Memola	(Japan) Rio Nakata	(Kazakhstan) Rakhat Bralin	Details
JGP Poland I	(United States) Lucas Broussard	(China) Chen Yudong	(Italy) Raffaele Francesco Zich	Details
JGP Poland II	(Japan) Takeru Amine Kataise	(United States) Robert Yampolsky	(South Korea) Seo Min-kyu	Details
JGP Italy	(United States) Lucas Broussard	(Japan) Shunsuke Nakamura	(Japan) Takeru Amine Kataise	Details
(Italy) JGP Final	(Italy) Nikolaj Memola	(United States) Lucas Broussard	(Japan) Nozomu Yoshioka	Details

=== Women's singles ===
Competition	Gold	Silver	Bronze	Results
JGP France	(Japan) Hana Yoshida	(Japan) Ayumi Shibayama	(South Korea) Kim Yu-jae	Details
JGP Czech Republic	(Japan) Mao Shimada	(South Korea) Kwon Min-sol	(Japan) Ikura Kushida	Details
JGP Latvia	(South Korea) Shin Ji-a	(United States) Soho Lee	(Japan) Ami Nakai	Details
JGP Poland I	(Japan) Mao Shimada	(Japan) Mone Chiba	(South Korea) Kim Chae-yeon	Details
JGP Poland II	(Japan) Ami Nakai	(South Korea) Shin Ji-a	(South Korea) Kwon Min-sol	Details
JGP Italy	(Japan) Hana Yoshida	(South Korea) Kim Chae-yeon	(Georgia (country)) Inga Gurgenidze	Details
(Italy) JGP Final	(Japan) Mao Shimada	(South Korea) Shin Ji-a	(South Korea) Kim Chae-yeon	Details

=== Pairs ===
Competition	Gold	Silver	Bronze	Results
JGP Czech Republic	(United States) Sophia Baram / Daniel Tioumentsev	(United States) Cayla Smith / Andy Deng	(Canada) Chloe Panetta / Kieran Thrasher	Details
JGP Latvia	(United States) Cayla Smith / Andy Deng	(Canada) Ava Rae Kemp / Yohnatan Elizarov	(Canada) Ashlyn Schmitz / Tristan Taylor	Details
JGP Poland I	(Australia) Anastasia Golubeva / Hektor Giotopoulos Moore	(Ukraine) Violetta Sierova / Ivan Khobta	(Japan) Haruna Murakami / Sumitada Moriguchi	Details
JGP Poland II	(Australia) Anastasia Golubeva / Hektor Giotopoulos Moore	(Ukraine) Violetta Sierova / Ivan Khobta	(United States) Sophia Baram / Daniel Tioumentsev	Details
(Italy) JGP Final	(Australia) Anastasia Golubeva / Hektor Giotopoulos Moore	(United States) Sophia Baram / Daniel Tioumentsev	(United States) Cayla Smith / Andy Deng	Details

=== Ice dance ===
Competition	Gold	Silver	Bronze	Results
JGP France	(South Korea) Hannah Lim / Ye Quan	(France) Célina Fradji / Jean-Hans Fourneaux	(United States) Vanessa Pham / Jonathan Rogers	Details
JGP Czech Republic	(Czech Republic) Kateřina Mrázková / Daniel Mrázek	(United Kingdom) Phebe Bekker / James Hernandez	(Japan) Nao Kida / Masaya Morita	Details
JGP Latvia	(Germany) Darya Grimm / Michail Savitskiy	(Canada) Sandrine Gauthier / Quentin Thieren	(Ukraine) Mariia Pinchuk / Mykyta Pogorielov	Details
JGP Poland I	(Canada) Nadiia Bashynska / Peter Beaumont	(United Kingdom) Phebe Bekker / James Hernandez	(France) Célina Fradji / Jean-Hans Fourneaux	Details
JGP Poland II	(Canada) Nadiia Bashynska / Peter Beaumont	(Germany) Darya Grimm / Michail Savitskiy	(Canada) Jordyn Lewis / Noah McMillan	Details
JGP Italy	(Czech Republic) Kateřina Mrázková / Daniel Mrázek	(South Korea) Hannah Lim / Ye Quan	(United States) Leah Neset / Artem Markelov	Details
(Italy) JGP Final	(Canada) Nadiia Bashynska / Peter Beaumont	(South Korea) Hannah Lim / Ye Quan	(Czech Republic) Kateřina Mrázková / Daniel Mrázek	Details

=== Medal table ===
Rank	Nation	Gold	Silver	Bronze	Total
1	Japan	9	4	7	20
2	United States	4	5	4	13
3	Canada	3	2	3	8
4	Australia	3	0	0	3
5	South Korea	2	7	5	14
6	Italy	2	1	1	4
7	Czech Republic	2	0	1	3
8	Germany	1	1	0	2
9	Ukraine	0	2	1	3
10	Great Britain	0	2	0	2
11	France	0	1	1	2
12	China	0	1	0	1
13	Georgia	0	0	1	1
13	Kazakhstan	0	0	1	1
13	Sweden	0	0	1	1
Totals (15 entries)		26	26	26	78

== Qualification ==
At each event, skaters earned points toward qualification for the Junior Grand Prix Final. Following the seventh event, the top six highest-scoring skaters/teams advanced to the Final. The points earned per placement were as follows.

Placement	Singles	Pairs/Ice dance
1st	15	15
2nd	13	13
3rd	11	11
4th	9	9
5th	7	7
6th	5	5
7th	4	4
8th	3	3
9th	2	—N/a
10th	1	—N/a

There were originally seven tie-breakers in cases of a tie in overall points:

1. Highest placement at an event. If a skater placed 1st and 3rd, the tiebreaker is the 1st place, and that beats a skater who placed 2nd in both events.
2. Highest combined total scores in both events. If a skater earned 200 points at one event and 250 at a second, that skater would win in the second tie-break over a skater who earned 200 points at one event and 150 at another.
3. Participated in two events.
4. Highest combined scores in the free skating/free dance portion of both events.
5. Highest individual score in the free skating/free dance portion from one event.
6. Highest combined scores in the short program/short dance of both events.
7. Highest number of total participants at the events.

If a tie remained, it was considered unbreakable and the tied skaters all advanced to the Junior Grand Prix Final.

=== Qualification standings ===
Points	Men	Women	Pairs	Ice dance
30	(United States) Lucas Broussard	(Japan) Mao Shimada (Japan) Hana Yoshida	(Australia) Anastasia Golubeva / Hektor Giotopoulos Moore	(Czech Republic) Kateřina Mrázková / Daniel Mrázek (Canada) Nadiia Bashynska / Peter Beaumont
28	(Italy) Nikolaj Memola (Japan) Shunsuke Nakamura	(South Korea) Shin Ji-a	(United States) Cayla Smith / Andy Deng	(South Korea) Hannah Lim / Ye Quan (Germany) Darya Grimm / Michail Savitskiy
26	(Japan) Takeru Amine Kataise	(Japan) Ami Nakai	(United States) Sophia Baram / Daniel Tioumentsev (Ukraine) Violetta Sierova / Ivan Khobta	(United Kingdom) Phebe Bekker / James Hernandez
24	—N/a	(South Korea) Kim Chae-yeon (South Korea) Kwon Min-sol	—N/a	(France) Célina Fradji / Jean-Hans Fourneaux
22	(Japan) Nozomu Yoshioka (United States) Robert Yampolsky (Japan) Rio Nakata (South Korea) Cha Young-hyun	(Japan) Mone Chiba	—N/a	—N/a
20	(South Korea) Seo Min-kyu	(Japan) Ayumi Shibayama (Georgia (country)) Inga Gurgenidze	(Canada) Ava Rae Kemp / Yohnatan Elizarov (Canada) Chloe Panetta / Kieran Thrasher (Japan) Haruna Murakami / Sumitada Moriguchi	(Canada) Sandrine Gauthier / Quentin Thieren (Ukraine) Mariia Pinchuk / Mykyta Pogorielov (United States) Vanessa Pham / Jonathan Rogers
18	—N/a	(United States) Mia Kalin	—N/a	
17	—N/a	(United States) Soho Lee	—N/a	
16	—N/a	—N/a	(Canada) Ashlyn Schmitz / Tristan Taylor (France) Oxana Vouillamoz / Flavien Giniaux	(United States) Jenna Hauer / Benjamin Starr
15	(Sweden) Andreas Nordebäck	—N/a	—N/a	(Canada) Jordyn Lewis / Noah McMillan
14	—N/a	(Switzerland) Kimmy Repond	—N/a	(Japan) Nao Kida / Masaya Morita (Slovakia) Anna Šimová / Kirill Aksenov (United States) Elliana Peal / Ethan Peal
13	(China) Chen Yudong	—N/a	—N/a	(Ukraine) Iryna Pidgaina / Artem Koval
12	(Switzerland) Naoki Rossi (France) François Pitot	(Estonia) Maria Eliise Kaljuvere (Latvia) Nikola Fomchenkova	—N/a	—N/a
11	(Kazakhstan) Rakhat Bralin (Italy) Raffaele Francesco Zich (Japan) Ryoga Morimoto (Canada) Aleksa Rakic (United States) Michael Xie	(South Korea) Kim Yu-jae (Japan) Ikura Kushida	—N/a	(United States) Leah Neset / Artem Markelov (Cyprus) Angelina Kudryavtseva / Ilia Karankevich (Germany) Karla Maria Karl / Kai Hoferichter
10	—N/a	(United States) Clare Seo (France) Lorine Schild	(Germany) Aliyah Ackermann / Tobija Harms (Czech Republic) Barbora Kucianová / Lukáš Vochozka	(United States) Helena Carhart / Volodymyr Horovyi
9	(Switzerland) Noah Bodenstein (Slovakia) Adam Hagara	—N/a	(Uzbekistan) Anastasiya Sazonova / Jamshid Tashmukhamedov	—N/a
8	—N/a	—N/a	(Germany) Sonja Loewenherz / Robert Loewenherz	—N/a
7	(Finland) Makar Suntsev (United States) Maxim Zharkov	(South Korea) Han Hee-sue (China) An Xiangyi (Thailand) Phattaratida Kaneshige	(China) Yang Yixi / Deng Shunyang	(Canada) Chaima Ben Khelifa / Everest Zhu
6	—N/a	(United States) Josephine Lee (Finland) Iida Karhunen	—N/a	(Israel) Elizabeth Tkachenko / Alexei Kiliakov
5	(Japan) Tsudoi Suto (France) Ian Vauclin (South Korea) Lee Jae-keun (United States) Kai Kovar	(United States) Sherry Zhang (Canada) Lia Pereira (United States) Elyce Lin-Gracey	(Spain) Carolina Shan Campillo / Miguel Martos	(Canada) Hailey Yu / Brendan Giang (France) Louise Bordet / Thomas Gipoulou (Georgia (country)) Grace Elizabeth Vainik / Yehor Barshak (Canada) Layla Veillom / Alexander Brandys
4	(Georgia (country)) Konstantin Supatashvili (United States) Beck Strommer	(Switzerland) Sarina Joos (Finland) Nella Pelkonen (South Korea) Hwang Ji-hyun	(Germany) Katalin Janne Salatzki / Lukas Röseler	(Italy) Noemi Maria Tali / Stefano Frasca (France) Lou Koch / Ivan Melnyk
3	(Sweden) Casper Johansson (United States) Daniel Martynov (United States) William Annis (Japan) Haru Kakiuchi (United States) Lucius Kazanecki	(South Korea) Kim Min-chae (Canada) Justine Miclette (Israel) Ella Chen	(United Kingdom) Lucy Hay / Kyle McLeod (France) Louise Ehrhard / Matthis Pellegris	(United Kingdom) Ashlie Slatter / Atl Ongay-Perez (Switzerland) Milla O'Brien / Laurin Wiederkehr
2	(Slovakia) Lukáš Václavík (United States) Joseph Klein (Kazakhstan) Dias Jirenbayev (Japan) Seigo Tauchi (Ukraine) Kyrylo Marsak (France) Jean Medard	(Estonia) Nataly Langerbaur (South Korea) Youn Seo-jin (United States) Hannah Herrera	—N/a	
1	(Israel) Lev Vinokur (Canada) Alec Guinzbourg (Canada) Anthony Paradis (Israel) Nikita Kovalenko (China) Tian Tonghe (Canada) David Li	(Israel) Mariia Seniuk (Germany) Valentina Andrianova (Canada) Kara Yun (South Korea) Song Si-woo (China) Cheng Jiaying (United States) Sarah Everhardt	—N/a	

=== Qualifiers ===
No.	Men	Women	Pairs	Ice dance
1	(United States) Lucas Broussard	(Japan) Mao Shimada	(Australia) Anastasia Golubeva / Hektor Giotopoulos Moore	(Czech Republic) Kateřina Mrázková / Daniel Mrázek
2	(Italy) Nikolaj Memola	(Japan) Hana Yoshida	(United States) Cayla Smith / Andy Deng	(Canada) Nadiia Bashynska / Peter Beaumont
3	(Japan) Shunsuke Nakamura	(South Korea) Shin Ji-a	(United States) Sophia Baram / Daniel Tioumentsev	(South Korea) Hannah Lim / Ye Quan
4	(Japan) Takeru Amine Kataise	(Japan) Ami Nakai	(Ukraine) Violetta Sierova / Ivan Khobta	(Germany) Darya Grimm / Michail Savitskiy
5	(Japan) Nozomu Yoshioka	(South Korea) Kim Chae-yeon	~~(Canada) Ava Rae Kemp / Yohnatan Elizarov~~ (withdrew)	(United Kingdom) Phebe Bekker / James Hernandez
6	(United States) Robert Yampolsky	(South Korea) Kwon Min-sol	(Canada) Chloe Panetta / Kieran Thrasher	(France) Célina Fradji / Jean-Hans Fourneaux

Alternates

No.	Men	Women	Pairs	Ice dance
1	(Japan) Rio Nakata	(Japan) Mone Chiba	(Japan) Haruna Murakami / Sumitada Moriguchi (called up)	(Canada) Sandrine Gauthier / Quentin Thieren
2	(South Korea) Cha Young-hyun	(Japan) Ayumi Shibayama	(Canada) Ashlyn Schmitz / Tristan Taylor	(Ukraine) Mariia Pinchuk / Mykyta Pogorielov
3	(South Korea) Seo Min-kyu	(Georgia (country)) Inga Gurgenidze	(France) Oxana Vouillamoz / Flavien Giniaux	(United States) Vanessa Pham / Jonathan Rogers

== Records and achievements ==
=== Records ===
The following new junior ISU best scores were set during this season:

Disc.	Segment	Skater(s)	Score	Event	Date	Ref.
Ice dance	Rhythm dance	(Czech Republic) Kateřina Mrázková / Daniel Mrázek	70.83	2022 JGP Czech Republic	September 2, 2022	
Ice dance	Rhythm dance	(Czech Republic) Kateřina Mrázková / Daniel Mrázek	71.87	2022 JGP Italy	October 13, 2022	

=== Achievements ===
- At the JGP France, Hannah Lim and Ye Quan were the first South Korean and the first Asian ice dance team to win an ISU Junior Grand Prix gold medal.
- At the JGP Czech Republic, Kateřina Mrázková and Daniel Mrázek were the first Czech ice dance team to win an ISU Grand Prix gold medal at either the junior or senior level.
- At the JGP Czech Republic, Phebe Bekker and James Hernandez were the first British ice dance team to win an ISU Grand Prix medal (a silver medal) at either the junior or senior level.
- At the JGP Czech Republic, Nao Kida and Masaya Morita were the first Japanese ice dance team to win an ISU Grand Prix medal (a bronze medal) at either the junior or senior level.
- Nikolaj Memola was the first Italian men's singles skater to win a gold medal at a JGP Final.
- Hannah Lim and Ye Quan were the first South Korean and the first Asian ice dance team to win a Grand Prix Final medal (a silver medal) at either the junior or senior level.
- Kateřina Mrázková and Daniel Mrázek won Czech Republic's first Grand Prix Final medal (a bronze medal) in ice dance at either the junior or senior level.

== Top scores ==
=== Men's singles ===
Top 10 best scores in the men's combined total
No.	Skater	Nation	Score	Event
1	Takeru Amine Kataise	Japan	234.24	2022 JGP Poland II
2	Nikolaj Memola	Italy	230.50	2022–23 JGP Final
3	Robert Yampolsky	United States	223.06	2022 JGP Poland II
4	Lucas Broussard	United States	220.43	2022–23 JGP Final
5	Nozomu Yoshioka	Japan	219.68	2022 JGP Czech Republic
6	Shunsuke Nakamura	Japan	219.65	2022 JGP France
7	Andreas Nordebäck	Sweden	212.37	2022 JGP Czech Republic
8	Seo Min-kyu	South Korea	209.59	2022 JGP Czech Republic
9	Chen Yudong	China	201.84	2022 JGP Poland I
10	Raffaele Francesco Zich	Italy	200.73	2022 JGP Poland I

Top 10 best scores in the men's short program
No.	Skater	Nation	Score	Event
1	Nikolaj Memola	Italy	83.04	2022 JGP Latvia
2	Lucas Broussard	United States	81.11	2022–23 JGP Final
3	Takeru Amine Kataise	Japan	79.06	2022 JGP Poland II
4	Shunsuke Nakamura	Japan	77.68	2022 JGP France
5	Robert Yampolsky	United States	77.39	2022 JGP Poland II
6	Rio Nakata	Japan	76.15	2022 JGP Poland II
7	Seo Min-kyu	South Korea	74.39	2022 JGP Czech Republic
8	Daniel Martynov	United States	72.35	2022 JGP Italy
9	François Pitot	France	72.22	2022 JGP Poland I
10	Nozomu Yoshioka	Japan	72.03	2022 JGP Czech Republic

Top 10 best scores in the men's free skating
No.	Skater	Nation	Score	Event
1	Takeru Amine Kataise	Japan	155.18	2022 JGP Poland II
2	Nikolaj Memola	Italy	150.66	2022–23 JGP Final
3	Chen Yudong	China	148.08	2022 JGP Poland I
4	Nozomu Yoshioka	Japan	147.65	2022 JGP Czech Republic
5	Robert Yampolsky	United States	145.67	2022 JGP Poland II
6	Shunsuke Nakamura	Japan	141.97	2022 JGP France
7	Andreas Nordebäck	Sweden	140.36	2022 JGP Czech Republic
8	Lucas Broussard	United States	140.27	2022 JGP Poland I
9	Seo Min-kyu	South Korea	135.20	2022 JGP Czech Republic
10	Cha Young-hyun	South Korea	133.46	2022 JGP Poland I

=== Women's singles ===
Top 10 best scores in the women's combined total
No.	Skater	Nation	Score	Event
1	Mao Shimada	Japan	217.68	2022 JGP Poland I
2	Hana Yoshida	Japan	208.31	2022 JGP Italy
3	Ami Nakai	Japan	205.90	2022 JGP Poland II
4	Mone Chiba	Japan	205.82	2022 JGP Poland I
5	Kim Chae-yeon	South Korea	203.94	2022 JGP Italy
6	Shin Ji-a	South Korea	200.32	2022–23 JGP Final
7	Inga Gurgenidze	Georgia	190.52	2022 JGP Italy
8	Kwon Min-sol	South Korea	189.37	2022 JGP Czech Republic
9	Ayumi Shibayama	Japan	188.39	2022 JGP France
10	Soho Lee	United States	185.92	2022 JGP Latvia

Top 10 best scores in the women's short program
No.	Skater	Nation	Score	Event
1	Mao Shimada	Japan	71.49	2022 JGP Czech Republic
2	Shin Ji-a	South Korea	70.41	2022 JGP Latvia
3	Kim Chae-yeon	South Korea	70.29	2022 JGP Italy
4	Mone Chiba	Japan	70.16	2022 JGP Poland I
5	Ami Nakai	Japan	69.00	2022 JGP Poland II
6	Ayumi Shibayama	Japan	67.09	2022 JGP France
7	Hana Yoshida	Japan	66.89	2022 JGP Italy
8	Kwon Min-sol	South Korea	66.81	2022 JGP Poland II
9	An Xiangyi	China	65.40	2022 JGP Poland I
10	Soho Lee	United States	64.06	2022 JGP Latvia

Top 10 best scores in the women's free skating
No.	Skater	Nation	Score	Event
1	Mao Shimada	Japan	148.87	2022 JGP Poland I
2	Hana Yoshida	Japan	141.42	2022 JGP Italy
3	Ami Nakai	Japan	136.90	2022 JGP Poland II
4	Mone Chiba	Japan	135.66	2022 JGP Poland I
5	Kim Chae-yeon	South Korea	133.65	2022 JGP Italy
6	Shin Ji-a	South Korea	131.21	2022–23 JGP Final
7	Inga Gurgenidze	Georgia	127.48	2022 JGP Italy
8	Kwon Min-sol	South Korea	126.64	2022 JGP Czech Republic
9	Kim Yu-jae	South Korea	124.80	2022 JGP France
10	Soho Lee	United States	121.86	2022 JGP Latvia

=== Pairs ===
Top 10 best scores in the pairs' combined total
No.	Team	Nation	Score	Event
1	Anastasia Golubeva / Hektor Giotopoulos Moore	Australia	181.37	2022–23 JGP Final
2	Sophia Baram / Daniel Tioumentsev	United States	176.78	2022–23 JGP Final
3	Violetta Sierova / Ivan Khobta	Ukraine	154.76	2022 JGP Poland II
4	Cayla Smith / Andy Deng	United States	150.51	2022–23 JGP Final
5	Haruna Murakami / Sumitada Moriguchi	Japan	149.03	2022–23 JGP Final
6	Oxana Vouillamoz / Flavien Giniaux	France	140.03	2022 JGP Poland I
7	Chloe Panetta / Kieran Thrasher	Canada	139.72	2022 JGP Czech Republic
8	Ava Rae Kemp / Yohnatan Elizarov	Canada	129.37	2022 JGP Poland II
9	Yang Yixi / Deng Shunyang	China	125.97	2022 JGP Poland I
10	Ashlyn Schmitz / Tristan Taylor	Canada	125.38	2022 JGP Poland II

Top 10 best scores in the pairs' short program
No.	Team	Nation	Score	Event
1	Sophia Baram / Daniel Tioumentsev	United States	63.77	2022 JGP Czech Republic
2	Anastasia Golubeva / Hektor Giotopoulos Moore	Australia	60.19	2022–23 JGP Final
3	Oxana Vouillamoz / Flavien Giniaux	France	56.94	2022 JGP Poland I
4	Violetta Sierova / Ivan Khobta	Ukraine	55.50	2022 JGP Poland II
5	Cayla Smith / Andy Deng	United States	55.21	2022–23 JGP Final
6	Haruna Murakami / Sumitada Moriguchi	Japan	47.94	2022 JGP Poland I
7	Chloe Panetta / Kieran Thrasher	Canada	47.93	2022 JGP Czech Republic
8	Barbora Kucianová / Lukáš Vochozka	Czech Republic	45.23	2022 JGP Poland I
9	Yang Yixi / Deng Shunyang	China	43.93	2022 JGP Poland I
10	Ava Rae Kemp / Yohnatan Elizarov	Canada	43.85	2022 JGP Poland II

Top 10 best scores in the pairs' free skating
No.	Team	Nation	Score	Event
1	Anastasia Golubeva / Hektor Giotopoulos Moore	Australia	121.18	2022–23 JGP Final
2	Sophia Baram / Daniel Tioumentsev	United States	113.16	2022–23 JGP Final
3	Haruna Murakami / Sumitada Moriguchi	Japan	102.23	2022–23 JGP Final
4	Violetta Sierova / Ivan Khobta	Ukraine	99.26	2022 JGP Poland II
5	Cayla Smith / Andy Deng	United States	95.30	2022–23 JGP Final
6	Chloe Panetta / Kieran Thrasher	Canada	91.79	2022 JGP Czech Republic
7	Ava Rae Kemp / Yohnatan Elizarov	Canada	85.52	2022 JGP Poland II
8	Ashlyn Schmitz / Tristan Taylor	Canada	83.86	2022 JGP Poland II
9	Oxana Vouillamoz / Flavien Giniaux	France	83.09	2022 JGP Poland I
10	Yang Yixi / Deng Shunyang	China	82.04	2022 JGP Poland I

=== Ice dance ===
Top 10 season's best scores in the combined total (ice dance)
No.	Team	Nation	Score	Event
1	Kateřina Mrázková / Daniel Mrázek	Czech Republic	176.26	2022 JGP Czech Republic
2	Nadiia Bashynska / Peter Beaumont	Canada	171.61	2022 JGP Poland II
3	Hannah Lim / Ye Quan	South Korea	162.53	2022–23 JGP Final
4	Darya Grimm / Michail Savitskiy	Germany	161.42	2022 JGP Latvia
5	Phebe Bekker / James Hernandez	Great Britain	159.55	2022 JGP Czech Republic
6	Célina Fradji / Jean-Hans Fourneaux	France	157.11	2022 JGP Poland I
7	Sandrine Gauthier / Quentin Thieren	Canada	156.92	2022 JGP Latvia
8	Leah Neset / Artem Markelov	United States	156.36	2022 JGP Italy
9	Mariia Pinchuk / Mykyta Pogorielov	Ukraine	150.95	2022 JGP Poland I
10	Jordyn Lewis / Noah McMillan	Canada	149.83	2022 JGP Poland II

Top 10 season's best scores in the rhythm dance
No.	Team	Nation	Score	Event
1	Kateřina Mrázková / Daniel Mrázek	Czech Republic	71.87	2022 JGP Italy
2	Nadiia Bashynska / Peter Beaumont	Canada	69.56	2022 JGP Poland II
3	Sandrine Gauthier / Quentin Thieren	Canada	65.45	2022 JGP Latvia
4	Célina Fradji / Jean-Hans Fourneaux	France	65.23	2022 JGP Poland I
5	Phebe Bekker / James Hernandez	Great Britain	65.19	2022 JGP Czech Republic
6	Hannah Lim / Ye Quan	South Korea	64.21	2022–23 JGP Final
7	Mariia Pinchuk / Mykyta Pogorielov	Ukraine	63.17	2022 JGP Poland I
8	Darya Grimm / Michail Savitskiy	Germany	63.05	2022 JGP Latvia
9	Leah Neset / Artem Markelov	United States	61.27	2022 JGP Italy
10	Nao Kida / Masaya Morita	Japan	61.05	2022 JGP Czech Republic

Top 10 season's best scores in the free dance
No.	Team	Nation	Score	Event
1	Kateřina Mrázková / Daniel Mrázek	Czech Republic	105.43	2022 JGP Czech Republic
2	Nadiia Bashynska / Peter Beaumont	Canada	102.99	2022 JGP Poland I
3	Hannah Lim / Ye Quan	South Korea	99.25	2022 JGP France
4	Darya Grimm / Michail Savitskiy	Germany	98.37	2022 JGP Latvia
5	Leah Neset / Artem Markelov	United States	95.09	2022 JGP Italy
6	Phebe Bekker / James Hernandez	Great Britain	94.68	2022 JGP Poland I
7	Célina Fradji / Jean-Hans Fourneaux	France	91.88	2022 JGP Poland I
8	Sandrine Gauthier / Quentin Thieren	Canada	91.47	2022 JGP Latvia
9	Jordyn Lewis / Noah McMillan	Canada	91.04	2022 JGP Poland II
10	Mariia Pinchuk / Mykyta Pogorielov	Ukraine	90.46	2022 JGP Latvia
