= Haru Kakiuchi =

Japanese figure skater (born 2006)

Personal information
- Native name: 垣内 珀琉
- Other names: Kakiuchi Haru
- Born: April 18, 2006 (age 20) Nishinomiya, Hyōgo Prefecture, Japan
- Home town: Nishinomiya, Hyōgo Prefecture, Japan
- Height: 1.72 m (5 ft 7 1/2 in)

Figure skating career
- Country: Japan
- Coach: Sayaka Yodo, Keiji Tanaka, Utako Nagamitsu
- Skating club: Hyogo Nishinomiya F.S.C.
- Began skating: 2010

Haru Kakiuchi (垣内 珀琉, Kakiuchi Haru; born 18 April 2006) is a Japanese figure skater. He is the 2023 JGP Hungary bronze medalist and 2023 Challenge Cup silver medalist on the Junior level.

== Personal life ==
Kakiuchi was born on April 18, 2006, in Nishinomiya, Hyōgo Prefecture, Japan. As hobbies, Kakiuchi enjoys listening to classical music as well as collecting rocks, old coins, and ukiyo-e.

He is currently a student at N High School.

== Career ==
=== Early career ===
Kakiuchi began figure skating in 2010 at the age of three after his mother, Kaori, encouraged him as a way to help overcome his shyness. That same year, Kakiuchi began training at the Kansai University Skating Club in Takatsuki, Osaka after being invited by Mie Hamada to train there as her student.

He won the silver medal on the novice b level at the 2016–17 Japan Championships. The following season, Kakiuchi won the silver medal at the 2017–18 Japan Novice A Championships and placed twenty-first at the 2017–18 Japan Junior Championships.

After finishing fifth at the 2018–19 Japan Novice A Championships, Kakiuchi moved back to his hometown of Nishinomiya and began training at the Hyogo Nishinomiya Figure Skating Club with Sayaka Yodo and Keiji Tanaka becoming his new coaches. He would place eighteenth at the 2019–20 Japan Junior Championships and thirteenth at both the 2020–21 and 2021–22 Japan Junior Championships.

=== 2022–2023 season ===
Making his junior international debut, Kakiuchi competed on the 2022–23 ISU Junior Grand Prix, finishing eighth at the 2022 JGP Czech Republic. He went on to finish sixth in the 2022–23 Japan Junior Championships. Due to his top eight finish, Kakiuchi was selected to compete at the 2022–23 Japan Senior Championships.

He went on to compete at the Japan Eastern Sectional Championships, winning the gold medal. At the 2022–23 Japan Junior Championships, Kakiuchi finished fifth and was selected to compete at the 2022–23 Japan Senior Championships due to this top eight finish. At those championships, Kakiuchi finished eighteenth.

Kakiuchi closed his season by winning silver on the junior level at the 2023 International Challenge Cup.

=== 2023–2024 season ===
Competing on the 2023–24 ISU Junior Grand Prix circuit, Kakiuchi began his season by finishing seventh at the 2023 JGP Austria and winning bronze at the 2023 JGP Hungary.

He then finished fourth at the 2023–24 Japan Junior Championships. With this result, combined with his placements on the Junior Grand Prix series, Kakiuchi was selected to represent Japan at both the 2024 Winter Youth Olympics and the 2024 World Junior Championships. He was also selected to compete at the 2023–24 Japan Senior Championships due to his top eight finish at the junior championships. He finished eighteenth at the latter event.

He went on to finish seventh at the Youth Olympics and seventeenth at the World Junior Championships.

=== 2024–25 season ===
Kakiuchi began the season by competing on the 2024–25 ISU Junior Grand Prix circuit, finishing fourth at 2024 JGP Thailand and eighth at 2024 JGP Slovenia.

In late November, he competed at the 2024–25 Japan Junior Championships, where he finished sixth. This result allowed him to qualify for the senior championships, where he finished seventeenth.

=== 2025–26 season ===
Kakiuchi opened his season by making his senior international debut at the 2025 CS Kinoshita Group Cup, where he finished in eleventh place. He was selected as the host pick to compete at the 2025 NHK Trophy, however, one month before the event, he sprained his ankle while practicing a quadruple Lutz jump. Despite this, Kakiuchi opted to compete albeit lowering the technical difficulty of his jumping passes. He ultimately finished the event in twelfth place.

In late December, he finished eighteenth at the 2025–26 Japan Championships.

== Programs ==
Season	Short program	Free skating
2025–2026	Love the Hell Out of You by Lewis Capaldi choreo. by Guillaume Cizeron	I giorni: Andante by Ludovico Einaudi performed by Daniel Hope, Jacques Ammon, & Kammerorchester Berlin; Violin Concerto No. 2, Movement III by Philip Glass performed by Gidon Kremer & Kremerata Baltica choreo. by Stéphane Lambiel
2024–2025	Caruso by Lucio Dalla performed by Joseph Calleja choreo. by Kohei Yoshino	I giorni: Andante by Ludovico Einaudi performed by Daniel Hope, Jacques Ammon, & Kammerorchester Berlin; Violin Concerto No. 2, Movement III by Philip Glass performed by Gidon Kremer & Kremerata Baltica choreo. by Stéphane Lambiel
2023–2024	Caruso by Lucio Dalla performed by Joseph Calleja choreo. by Kohei Yoshino	Wake Me Up by Avicii performed by Avicii & Simply Three choreo. by Misao Sato
2022–2023	Libertango by Astor Piazzolla performed by Taro Hakase choreo. by Kenji Miyamoto	Wake Me Up by Avicii performed by Avicii & Simply Three choreo. by Misao Sato
2021–2022	Buzoku by DRUM TAO	La campanella (from Grandes Études de Paganini) by Franz Liszt performed by Nobuyuki Tsujii

== Competitive highlights ==
- GP – Event of the ISU Grand Prix Series
- JGP – Event of the ISU Junior Grand Prix Series
- CS – Event of the ISU Challenger Series
- TBD – Assigned
- WD – Withdrew from competition

Competition placements at senior level
Season	2022–23	2023–24	2024–25	2025–26
Japan Championships	18th	18th	17th	18th
GP NHK Trophy				12th
CS Kinoshita Group Cup				11th

Competition placements at junior level
Season	2017–18	2019–20	2020–21	2021–22	2022–23	2023–24	2024–25
Winter Youth Olympics						7th	
World Junior Championships						17th	
Japan Championships	21st	20th	13th	14th	6th	4th	6th
JGP Austria						7th	
JGP Czech Republic					8th		
JGP Hungary						3rd	
JGP Slovenia							8th
JGP Thailand							4th
Challenge Cup					2nd		

== Detailed results ==
ISU personal best scores in the +5/-5 GOE System
Segment	Type	Score	Event
Total	**TSS**	**209.50**	2024 JGP Thailand
Short program	**TSS**	**69.99**	2024 JGP Thailand
Short program	TES	36.89	2024 JGP Thailand
Short program	PCS	33.94	2023 JGP Austria
Free skating	**TSS**	**139.51**	2024 JGP Thailand
Free skating	TES	71.02	2024 JGP Thailand
Free skating	PCS	68.49	2024 JGP Thailand

Current personal best scores are highlighted in bold.

=== Senior level ===
Results in the 2025–26 season
Date	Event	SP		FS		Total	
Date	Event	P	Score	P	Score	P	Score
Sep 5–7, 2025	(Japan) 2025 CS Kinoshita Group Cup	11	65.67	9	138.16	11	203.83
Nov 7–9, 2025	(Japan) 2025 NHK Trophy	12	61.59	12	124.81	12	186.40
Dec 18–21, 2025	2025–26 Japan Championships	15	70.68	17	128.88	18	199.56

2024–25 season
Date	Event	SP	FS	Total
December 19–22, 2024	2024–25 Japan Championships	17; 70.52	15; 132.75	17; 203.27
2023–24 season
Date	Event	SP	FS	Total
December 20–24, 2023	2023–24 Japan Championships	21; 64.58	14; 131.72	18; 196.30
2022–23 season
Date	Event	SP	FS	Total
December 21–25, 2022	2022–23 Japan Championships	21; 61.42	18; 126.55	18; 187.97

=== Junior level ===
2024–25 season
Date	Event	SP	FS	Total
November 15–17, 2024	2024–25 Japan Junior Championships	15; 58.05	6; 129.88	6; 187.93
October 2–5, 2024	2024 JGP Slovenia	7; 68.07	8; 126.31	8; 194.38
September 11–14, 2024	2024 JGP Thailand	5; **69.99**	4; **139.51**	4; **209.50**
2023–24 season
Date	Event	SP	FS	Total
February 26–March 3, 2024	2024 World Junior Championships	16; 65.49	13; 127.33	17; 192.82
January 27–29, 2024	2024 Winter Youth Olympics	8; 61.11	5; 124.77	7; 185.88
November 17–19, 2023	2023–24 Japan Junior Championships	3; 68.64	5; 129.33	4; 197.97
September 20–23, 2023	2023 JGP Hungary	4; 66.95	3; 133.87	3; 200.82
August 30–September 2, 2023	2023 JGP Austria	4; 69.39	11; 111.12	7; 180.51
2022–23 season
Date	Event	SP	FS	Total
February 23–26, 2023	2023 International Challenge Cup	2; 59.15	1; 115.00	2; 174.15
November 25–27, 2022	2022–23 Japan Junior Championships	6; 63.39	10; 117.34	6; 180.73
August 31–September 3, 2022	2022 JGP Czech Republic	8; 64.58	9; 113.43	8; 178.01
2021–22 season
Date	Event	SP	FS	Total
November 19–21, 2021	2021–22 Japan Junior Championships	13; 56.00	16; 93.46	14; 149.46
2020–21 season
Date	Event	SP	FS	Total
November 21–23, 2020	2020–21 Japan Junior Championships	13; 57.32	13; 102.52	13; 159.84
2019–20 season
Date	Event	SP	FS	Total
November 15–17, 2019	2019–20 Japan Junior Championships	18; 47.88	20; 84.97	20; 132.85
2017–18 season
Date	Event	SP	FS	Total
November 24–26, 2017	2017–18 Japan Junior Championships	22; 41.86	20; 88.38	21; 130.24
