= Cyprus at the 2024 Winter Youth Olympics =

- Flag of Cyprus
- IOC code: CYP
- NOC: Cyprus Olympic Committee

in Gangwon, South Korea 19 January 2024 – 1 February 2024
- Competitors: 3 in 2 sports
- Flag bearers (opening): Andreas Kasiouris & Andrea Loizidou
- Flag bearer (closing): TBD
- Medals: Gold 0 Silver 0 Bronze 0 Total 0

Winter Youth Olympics appearances
- 2012; 2016; 2020; 2024

Cyprus is scheduled to compete at the 2024 Winter Youth Olympics in Gangwon, South Korea, from January 19 to February 1, 2024, This will be Cyprus's fourth appearance at the Winter Youth Olympic Games, having competed at every Games since the inaugural edition in 2012.

The Cypriot team consisted of three athletes (one man and two women) competing in two sports. This was the largest ever team the country has sent to the Winter Youth Olympics. Alpine skiers Andreas Kasiouris and Andrea Loizidou were the country's flagbearers during the opening ceremony.

== Competitors ==
The following is the list of number of competitors (per gender) participating at the games per sport/discipline.

Sport	Men	Women	Total
Alpine skiing	1	1	2
Figure skating	0	1	1
Total	1	2	3

== Alpine skiing ==
Cyprus qualified two alpine skiers (one per gender).

Athlete	Event	Run 1		Run 2		Total	
Athlete	Event	Time	Rank	Time	Rank	Time	Rank
Andreas Kasiouris	Men's giant slalom	Did not finish					
Andreas Kasiouris	Men's slalom	Did not finish					
Andrea Loizidou	Women's giant slalom	Did not finish					
Andrea Loizidou	Women's slalom	1:01.36	50	58.56	35	1:59.92	35

== Figure skating ==
Cyprus qualified one women's athlete based on the results of the 2023 World Junior Figure Skating Championships.

Singles

Athlete	Event	SP		FS		Total	
Athlete	Event	Points	Rank	Points	Rank	Points	Rank
Stefania Yakovleva	Women's	Withdrew					

== See also ==
- Cyprus at the 2024 Summer Olympics
