= Cyprus at the 2016 Winter Youth Olympics =

- IOC code: CYP
- NOC: Cyprus Olympic Committee
- Website: olympic.org.cy

in Lillehammer
- Competitors: 1 in 1 sport
- Medals: Gold 0 Silver 0 Bronze 0 Total 0

Winter Youth Olympics appearances
- 2012; 2016; 2020; 2024

Cyprus competed at the 2016 Winter Youth Olympics in Lillehammer, Norway from 12 to 21 February 2016.

== Alpine skiing ==
Girls

Athlete	Event	Run 1		Run 2		Total	
Athlete	Event	Time	Rank	Time	Rank	Time	Rank
Andriani Pieri	Slalom	1:15.96	38	1:10.71	32	2:26.67	32
Andriani Pieri	Giant slalom	DNS		did not advance			

== See also ==
- Cyprus at the 2016 Summer Olympics
