= Rio Nakata =

Welsh-Japanese figure skater (born 2008)

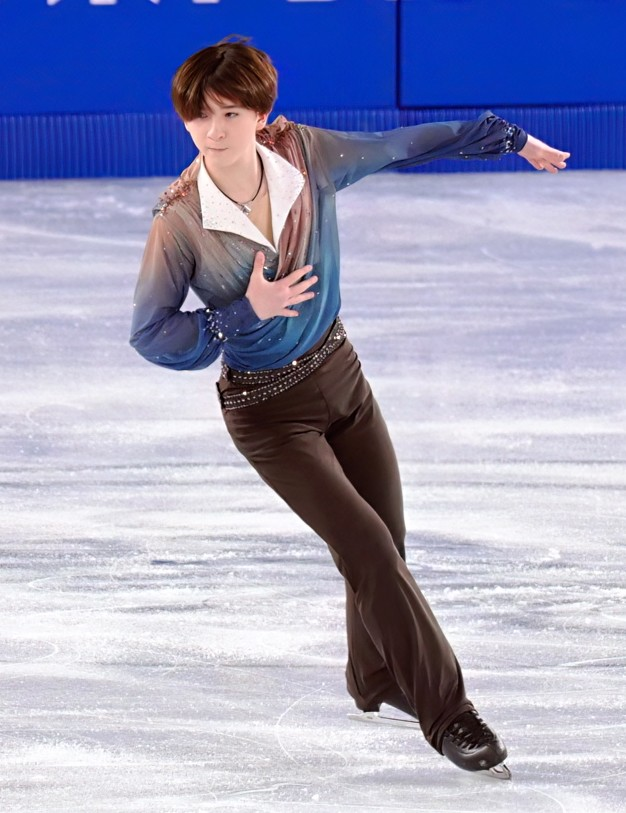
- Nakata performing his free skate at the 2024–25 Junior Grand Prix Final

Personal information
- Native name: 中田璃士
- Other names: Nakata Rio
- Born: 8 September 2008 (age 18) Cardiff, Wales
- Home town: Chiba, Japan
- Height: 1.66 m (5 ft 5 1/2 in)

Figure skating career
- Country: Japan
- Coach: Makoto Nakata; Kensuke Nakaniwa; Momoe Nagumo; Aya Tanoue; Niina Takeno
- Skating club: Tokio Inkarami
- Began skating: 2011

Medal record
Japan Championships
Silver medal – second place	2024–25 Osaka	Singles
World Junior Championships
Gold medal – first place	2025 Debrecen	Singles
Gold medal – first place	2026 Tallinn	Singles
Silver medal – second place	2024 Taipei	Singles
Junior Grand Prix Final
Gold medal – first place	2023–24 Beijing	Singles
Silver medal – second place	2025–26 Nagoya	Singles
Bronze medal – third place	2024–25 Grenoble	Singles

Rio Nakata (中田璃士, Nakata Rio; born 8 September 2008) is a Welsh-Japanese figure skater. On the junior level, he is a two-time Junior World champion (2025, 2026), the 2024 Junior World silver medalist, the 2023–24 Junior Grand Prix Final champion, the 2025-26 Junior Grand Prix Final silver medalist, the 2024–25 Junior Grand Prix Final bronze medalist, a five-time ISU Junior Grand Prix medalist, a two-time Japanese Junior national champion (2024–25), and the 2023–24 Japanese Junior national silver medalist.

On the senior level, he is the 2026 Skate Canada International silver medalist and the 2024–25 Japanese Championships silver medalist.

== Personal life ==
Nakata was born on 8 September 2008 in Cardiff, Wales to his Welsh mother, Hollie Mason, and Japanese father, Makoto Nakata. In addition, he has two younger brothers, Lewis and Joshua, the latter of whom is also a competitive figure skater.

The family moved to Tokyo, Japan during Nakata's toddler years before eventually settling in Chiba in 2022. Nakata is bilingual, able to speak Japanese and English fluently. Despite having lived in Japan for most of his life, he primarily communicates with his family in English while at home.

He attended Wakamatsu Junior High School before enrolling at Chukyo University Senior High School.

As a hobby, he enjoys baseball.

== Career ==
=== Early career ===
Nakata began figure skating in 2011 at the age of three at a rink in Tokyo where his father, Makoto, coached at the time. Since then, Makoto has remained part of Nakata's coaching team.

He debuted at the basic novice level by winning silver at the 2018 Tokyo Regionals, before going on to win bronze at the 2018–19 Japan Basic Novice Championships. The following year, Nakata won gold at both events.

Competing at the advanced novice level, Nakata won gold at both the 2020 Tokyo Regionals and the 2020–21 Japan Advanced Novice Championships. As the reigning Japanese national novice champion, Nakata was invited to skate in the gala at the 2020 NHK Trophy. He was then selected to compete at the 2020–21 Japan Junior Championships, finishing seventeenth. The subsequent season, Nakata won silver and gold, respectively, at the 2021 Tokyo Regionals and the 2021–22 Japan Novice Championships. He then placed seventeenth at the 2021–22 Japan Junior Championships.

In summer 2022, Nakata began training at the MF Figure Skating Academy in Chiba due to his father getting a coaching job there. It was there that Kensuke Nakaniwa also joined his coaching team.

=== 2022–2023 season: First JGP medal ===
Making his junior international debut, Nakata competed on the 2022–23 ISU Junior Grand Prix, winning silver at the 2022 JGP Latvia and finishing fourth at the 2022 JGP Poland II. With these results, Nakata was named as the first alternate for the 2022–23 Junior Grand Prix Final.

He went on to compete at the Japan Eastern Sectional Championships, winning the gold medal. At the 2022–23 Japan Junior Championships, Nakata finished fifth and was selected to compete at the 2022–23 Japan Senior Championships due to this top eight finish. At those championships, Nakata finished twenty-sixth in the short program and did not advance to the free skate segment of the competition.

Nakata closed his season by winning silver on the junior level at the 2023 Triglav Trophy.

=== 2023–2024 season: JGP Final gold and World Junior silver ===
Competing on the 2023–24 ISU Junior Grand Prix circuit, Nakata began his season by winning gold at the 2023 JGP Thailand, landing a clean quad jump (the toe loop) for the first time in competition. He would subsequently win silver at the 2023 JGP Turkey behind South Korean skater, Seo Min-kyu. These results guaranteed Nakata a spot at the 2023–24 Junior Grand Prix Final.

Nakata went on to win gold on the junior level of the 2023 Tokyo Regionals and the silver medal at the 2023 Japan Eastern Sectional Championships. He then won the silver medal at the 2023–24 Japan Junior Championships behind Shunsuke Nakamura. With this result, combined with his success on the Junior Grand Prix series, Nakata was selected to represent Japan at both the 2024 Winter Youth Olympics and the 2024 World Junior Championships. He was also selected to compete at the 2023–24 Japan Senior Championships due to his top eight finish at the junior championships.

At the 2023–24 Junior Grand Prix Final in Beijing, China, Nakata placed fourth in the short program after falling on a planned triple Axel attempt and receiving an edge call on his triple Lutz. However, he went on to win the free skate after landing a clean quad toe and seven clean triple jumps, and take the gold medal. At the event, Nakata said, "I wanted to show the world what I can do. It's my biggest competition yet so far and that made me really nervous. Being the youngest competitor here I feel like I am so small, and the others are so big. So, I have to compensate it by skating big!... I am so happy! Today is my mom's birthday and I think I gave her a nice present today... The result is a great achievement, but there are many competitions ahead this season. I need to work harder; I cannot relax now."

Competing on the senior level at the 2023–24 Japan Championships, Nakata finished seventeenth.

Nakata entered the Youth Olympics in Gangwon as one of the favourites for the gold medal in the men's event, which had been won by Japanese the prior two editions. However, after a "woeful" short program in which he made mistakes on two of three jumping passes and fell on a spin entry he finished thirteenth in the segment, and more than twenty points behind the leader. He rebounded in the free skate, coming second in that segment and rising to fifth overall. Nakata called it "a good experience for me this time. I felt the crowd's support for me. I was so happy that I showed everybody what I can do."

Finishing the season at the 2024 World Junior Championships, Nakata had a difficult landing on his jump combination and lost a level on one of his spins, but still earned 77.60 points and came fifth in the segment. He admitted that the Youth Olympic short program had been a "big shock" that left him "pretty scared of the short program today," but was pleased with the result. In the free skate his only error was stepping out of a quad toe loop attempt, and he won the segment with a personal best score of 151.71, earning a gold small medal. Nakata won the silver medal overall, 1.44 points behind champion Seo Min-kyu of South Korea.

=== 2024–25 season: Junior national title, Senior national silver medal, and World Junior gold ===
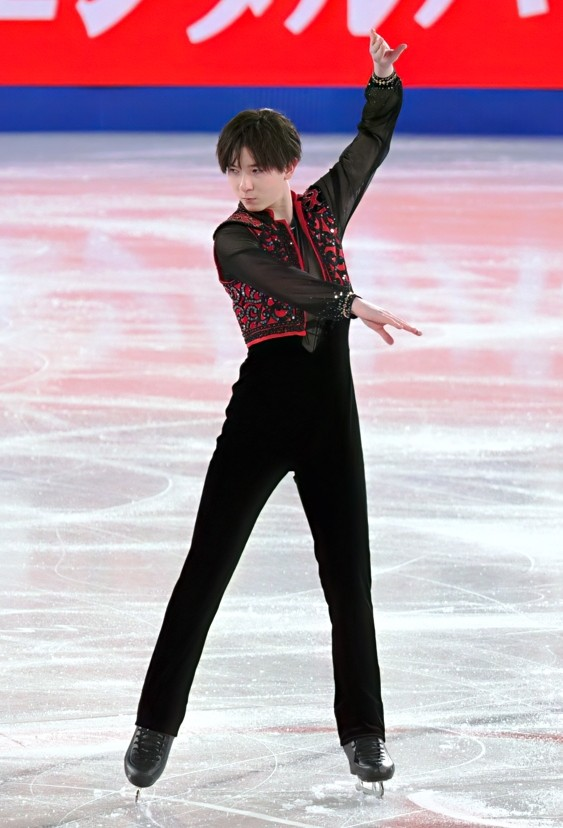
Nakata during his short program at the 2024–25 Junior Grand Prix Final

In preparation for the season, Nakata requested that choreographer, Shin Yea-ji, create his free program to the music of Pirates of the Caribbean as a tribute to his father, who had previously skated to that music as a competitive figure skater. Nakata began the season by competing on the Junior Grand Prix series, winning silver at 2024 JGP Thailand and gold at 2024 JGP China. For the latter event's medal ceremony, Nakata changed into his father's old Pirates of the Caribbean costume. His results on the Junior Grand Prix allowed him to qualify for the Junior Grand Prix Final for a second consecutive time.

In late November, Nakata competed at the 2024–25 Japan Junior Championships, where he won the gold medal. This result ensured his qualification to compete at the senior championships.

At the Junior Grand Prix Final in Grenoble, France, Nakata won the short program but was only fourth in the free skate due to popping a planned triple Axel and triple Loop in single jumps. He would take bronze overall behind Jacob Sanchez of the United States and Seo Min-kyu of South Korea. He expressed frustration following the event, saying, "I was very nervous ahead of my competition. I feel so disappointed. This is giving me a lot of energy for my next competition which will be the Japanese Nationals! I want to achieve all my goals from now on."

In late December, Nakata competed at the 2024–25 Japan Championships, where he delivered two clean skates that included a free skate where he successfully attempted and landed a quad Loop jump for the first time in competition. Due to several of the event's older medal contenders faltering during their short and free programs, Nakata managed to place second in both competition segments and won the silver medal overall behind Yuma Kagiyama. Following the competition, Nakata expressed shock and elation at the result, saying, "I still haven't sorted my head out yet, but I finally achieved my goal. I didn't do well in the 6-minute practice, but I was able to concentrate on what I had to do. I was able to land the (quadruple) loop for the only time in this competition, and I was very happy to land two quadruples for the first time in my life." He was subsequently named to the World Junior team.

At the 2025 World Junior Championship in Debrecen, Hungary, Nakata skated cleanly and scored a personal best, finishing second in that segment, only 0.64 points behind defending champion, Seo Min-kyu. During the free skate, Nakata stepped out of his opening quad toe-loop attempt but followed that up with a clean quad toe-triple toe combination and without any other mistakes. He won the free skate segment, scoring a new personal best of 162.95 and winning the gold medal overall. Following the event, he said, "I practiced up until now for this, to get gold here. There are many people around here so I am not showing my emotions too much since it won’t be nice. I will get very happy once I’m back to the hotel. When I made a mistake at the beginning I felt very stressed but after that I calmed down. I was able to hang onto it until the end, and I think the biggest thing I got from this competition, well, I failed my first toe-loop, but I think the second one was the best one. At first, I thought it was going to go bad. When I had the step out. After that, I wasn’t sure if I could do the Axel but I decided to trust my training up until now, to not let it all go to waste."

Nakata was invited to skate in the gala at the 2025 World Team Trophy as the World Junior champion.

=== 2025–26 season: JGP Final silver and second consecutive World Junior gold ===
Nakata started the season by competing on the Junior Grand Prix circuit, winning gold at 2025 JGP Latvia and at 2025 JGP Thailand. With these results, he qualified for the 2025–26 Junior Grand Prix Final.

In late September, Nakata, who had been dealing with pain in his left leg since July, underwent an MRI scan, which determined that he had sustained a stress fracture. As a result, he significantly reduced his training time and was unable to practice jumps for a whole month.

Returning to competition in late November, Nakata competed at the 2025–26 Japan Junior Championships, where he won the national title for a second consecutive time.

At the 2025–26 Junior Grand Prix Final in Nagoya, Japan, Nakata won the silver medal behind Seo Min-kyu after winning the short program and placing second in the free skate. Two weeks later, he competed on the senior level at the 2025–26 Japan Championships, where he finished fourth overall.

At the 2026 World Junior Figure Skating Championships, Nakata won the short program, breaking the world record for most points scored in the short program in the men's junior field previously held by Ilia Malinin. He went on to win the free skate and win the gold medal overall while earning personal bests in both those segments. "Of course I am very satisfied with this placement,” said Nakata after the free skate. “I was aiming to defend my title, and I was able to do exactly that, so I am happy about it. However, when I look at the judges’ scores, I lost levels on the spins. I had four, three and two, so that is quite horrible. That is something I really need to focus on for next season. I need to practice a lot more for that."

=== 2026–27 season: Senior international debut ===
Nakata debuted internationally as a senior skater at the 2026 Kinoshita Group Cup. In the short program, Rio achieved a new personal best score of 96.48 points and placed first in that segment. In the free skating segment, Nakata attempted too many toe-loop jumping passes which invalidated one of his quad toe loop jumps, losing 10.45 points of base value. This led him to place 7th in that segment, finishing the event in 5th place overall.

Nakata made his senior Grand Prix debut at the 2026 Skate Canada. Placing first in the short program, he later placed fourth in the free skate which led him to place second overall behind Kevin Aymoz of France. Nakata expressed disappointment on his second place finish, "Honestly, I was only aiming for first at this competition, so I'm honestly not happy even with second. I have to get a higher placement at NHK Trophy or I can't go to the Final, so it's frustrating. I think it's really either win at NHK or there's no Final."

== Records ==
Chronological list of world record scores in the +5/-5 GOE System
Date	Score	Segment	Event
4 March 2026	89.51	Short program (J)	2026 World Junior Championships

== Programs ==
Season	Short program	Free skating	Exhibition
2026–2027	Alive by R3hab & Vini Vici choreo. by Shae-Lynn Bourne	Gladiator; The Wheat; The Battle by Hans Zimmer; Gladiator II; The Dream Is Lost; Strength and Honor by Harry Gregson-Williams; Gladiator 2 (Theme) (Epic Trailer Version) by Well F. Silva choreo. by Misha Ge	Give Me Love by Ed Sheeran
2025–2026	Aroul; Uccen (DWTS Remix) by The Taalbi Brothers choreo. by Misha Ge	Gladiator; The Wheat; The Battle by Hans Zimmer; Gladiator II; The Dream Is Lost; Strength and Honor by Harry Gregson-Williams; Gladiator 2 (Theme) (Epic Trailer Version) by Well F. Silva choreo. by Misha Ge	Victorious by CHUXX MORRIS choreo. by Joey Russell
2024–2025	Aroul; Uccen (DWTS Remix) by The Taalbi Brothers choreo. by Misha Ge	Pirates of the Caribbean; Jack Sparrow; Singapore; At Wit's End by Hans Zimmer; My Name is Barbossa; Treasure; Beyond My Beloved Horizon; You Speak of the Trident by Geoff Zanelli choreo. by Shin Yea-ji	Aroul; Uccen (DWTS Remix) by The Taalbi Brothers choreo. by Misha Ge; Take Me to Church by Hozier; Someone You Loved by Lewis Capaldi
2023–2024	God Particle by Joshua Bell, Hans Zimmer; 160 BPM (from Angels & Demons) by Hans Zimmer choreo. by Kenji Miyamoto	Blunt Instrument (from Casino Royale) by David Arnold; Writing's on the Wall (from Spectre) by Sam Smith; James Bond Theme by Monty Norman choreo. by Eiji Iwamoto	Someone You Loved by Lewis Capaldi; Believer by Imagine Dragons choreo. by Eiki Hattori
2022–2023	Believer by Imagine Dragons choreo. by Eiki Hattori	Blunt Instrument (from Casino Royale) by David Arnold; Writing's on the Wall (from Spectre) by Sam Smith; James Bond Theme by Monty Norman choreo. by Eiji Iwamoto	
2021–2022	Believer by Imagine Dragons choreo. by Eiki Hattori	Irish Legend by Billx & Black Muffin choreo. by Eiji Iwamoto	

== Competitive highlights ==
- JGP – Event of the ISU Junior Grand Prix Series
- TBD – Assigned
- WD – Withdrew from competition

Competition placements at senior level
Season	2022–23	2023–24	2024–25	2025–26	2026–27
Japan Championships	26th	17th	2nd	4th	
GP NHK Trophy					TBD
GP Skate Canada					2nd
CS Kinoshita Group Cup					5th

Competition placements at junior level
Season	2020–21	2021–22	2022–23	2023–24	2024–25	2025–26
Winter Youth Olympics				5th		
World Junior Championships				2nd	1st	1st
Junior Grand Prix Final				1st	3rd	2nd
Japan Championships	17th	17th	5th	2nd	1st	1st
JGP China					1st	
JGP Latvia			2nd			1st
JGP Poland			4th			
JGP Thailand				1st	2nd	1st
JGP Turkey				2nd		
Triglav Trophy			2nd			

== Detailed results ==
ISU personal best scores in the +5/-5 GOE System
Segment	Type	Score	Event
Total	TSS	268.47	2026 World Junior Championships
Short program	TSS	96.48	2026 Kinoshita Group Cup
Short program	TES	56.31	2026 Kinoshita Group Cup
Short program	PCS	42.23	2026 World Junior Championships
Free skating	TSS	178.96	2026 World Junior Championships
Free skating	TES	95.71	2026 World Junior Championships
Free skating	PCS	83.25	2026 World Junior Championships

=== Senior level ===
Results in the 2022–23 season
Date	Event	SP		FS		Total	
Date	Event	P	Score	P	Score	P	Score
Dec 21–25, 2022	2022–23 Japan Championships	26	57.74	—N/a	—N/a	26	57.74

Results in the 2023–24 season
Date	Event	SP		FS		Total	
Date	Event	P	Score	P	Score	P	Score
Dec 20–24, 2023	2023–24 Japan Championships	16	71.45	17	128.82	17	200.27

Results in the 2024–25 season
Date	Event	SP		FS		Total	
Date	Event	P	Score	P	Score	P	Score
19–22 Dec 2024	2024–25 Japan Championships	2	90.31	2	173.68	2	263.99

Results in the 2025–26 season
Date	Event	SP		FS		Total	
Date	Event	P	Score	P	Score	P	Score
Dec 18–21, 2025	2025–26 Japan Championships	3	89.91	4	158.74	4	248.65

Results in the 2026-27 season
Date	Event	SP		FS		Total	
Date	Event	P	Score	P	Score	P	Score
Sep 4–6, 2026	(Japan) 2026 CS Kinoshita Group Cup	1	96.48	7	146.67	5	243.15
Oct 30 - Nov 1, 2026	2026 Skate Canada International	1	92.64	4	156.61	2	249.25

=== Junior level ===
2025–26 season
Date	Event	SP	FS	Total
3-8 March 2026	2026 World Junior Championships	1; 89.51	1; 176.96	1; 268.47
4-7 December 2025	2025-26 Junior Grand Prix Final	1; 86.48	2; 163.22	2; 249.70
22–24 November 2025	2025–26 Japan Junior Championships	1; 84.99	1; 170.26	1; 255.25
9–13 September 2025	2025 JGP Thailand	1; 83.56	1; 162.64	1; 246.20
20–23 August 2025	2025 JGP Latvia	1; 88.72	1; 158.22	1; 246.94
2024–25 season
Date	Event	SP	FS	Total
25 February–2 March 2025	2025 World Junior Championships	2; 86.04	1; 162.95	1; 248.99
5–8 December 2024	2024–25 Junior Grand Prix Final	1; 79.39	4; 135.94	3; 215.33
15–17 November 2024	2024–25 Japan Junior Championships	2; 77.92	1; 142.55	1; 220.47
9–12 October 2024	2024 JGP China	1; 81.55	1; 151.98	1; 233.53
11–14 September 2024	2024 JGP Thailand	2; 76.54	2; 142.17	2; 218.71
2023–24 season
Date	Event	SP	FS	Total
26 February–3 March 2024	2024 World Junior Championships	5; 77.60	1; 151.71	2; 229.31
26 January–2 February 2024	2024 Winter Youth Olympics	13; 55.59	2; 142.70	5; 198.29
7–10 December 2023	2023–24 Junior Grand Prix Final	4; 67.71	1; 160.06	1; 227.77
17–19 November 2023	2023–24 Japan Junior Championships	5; 64.28	1; 141.48	2; 205.76
6–9 September 2023	2023 JGP Turkey	3; 73.55	2; 148.80	2; 222.35
23–26 August 2023	2023 JGP Thailand	3; 75.28	1; 142.37	1; 217.65
2022–23 season
Date	Event	SP	FS	Total
12–16 April 2023	2023 Triglav Trophy	2; 65.42	2; 119.03	2; 184.45
25–27 November 2022	2022–23 Japan Junior Championships	7; 63.26	4; 126.98	5; 190.24
5–8 October 2022	2022 JGP Poland	3; 76.15	4; 124.26	4; 200.41
7–10 September 2022	2022 JGP Latvia	3; 68.91	3; 131.26	2; 200.17
2021–22 season
Date	Event	SP	FS	Total
19–21 November 2021	2021–22 Japan Junior Championships	10; 57.87	23; 84.60	17; 142.47
2020–21 season
Date	Event	SP	FS	Total
21–23 November 2020	2020–21 Japan Junior Championships	20; 47.94	15; 96.14	17; 144.08
