= Cyprus at the 2012 Winter Youth Olympics =

- IOC code: CYP
- NOC: Cyprus Olympic Committee
- Website: olympic.org.cy

in Innsbruck
- Competitors: 1 in 1 sport
- Flag bearer: Dinos Lefkaritis
- Medals: Gold 0 Silver 0 Bronze 0 Total 0

Winter Youth Olympics appearances
- 2012; 2016; 2020; 2024

Cyprus competed at the 2012 Winter Youth Olympics in Innsbruck, Austria. The Cypriot team was made up of one athlete, an alpine skier.

== Alpine skiing ==
Cyprus qualified one boy in alpine skiing.

Boy

| Athlete | Event | Final | | | |
| Athlete | Event | Run 1 | Run 2 | Total | Rank |
|---|---|---|---|---|---|
| Dinos Lefkaritis | Slalom | 1:02.83 | 47.62 | 1:50.45 | 34 |
| Dinos Lefkaritis | Giant slalom | 1:06.71 | DNF | | |

== See also ==
- Cyprus at the 2012 Summer Olympics
