= Figure skating at the 2024 Winter Youth Olympics – Women's singles =

Women's singles at the IV Winter Youth Olympic Games
- Venue: Gangneung Ice Arena
- Dates: 28, 30 January
- Competitors: 18 from 16 nations

Medalists
1st place, gold medalist(s)		Mao Shimada	Japan
2nd place, silver medalist(s)		Shin Ji-a	South Korea
3rd place, bronze medalist(s)		Yo Takagi	Japan

The women's singles competition of the 2024 Winter Youth Olympics was held at the Gangneung Ice Arena on 28 January (short program) and 30 January 2024 (free skating).

== Results ==
=== Short program ===
The short program was held on 28 January at 16:10.

Pl.	Name	Nation	TSS	TES	PCS	CO	PR	SK	Ded	StN
1	Mao Shimada	Japan	71.05	39.41	31.64	7.93	7.86	8.00	0.00	16
2	Yo Takagi	Japan	67.23	37.67	29.56	7.43	7.29	7.50	0.00	8
3	Shin Ji-a	South Korea	66.48	35.86	30.62	7.71	7.64	7.68	0.00	17
4	Kim Yu-seong	South Korea	63.64	36.52	27.12	6.86	6.86	6.68	0.00	12
5	Gao Shiqi	China	60.28	33.77	26.51	6.50	6.61	6.82	0.00	4
6	Kaiya Ruiter	Canada	58.78	31.52	27.26	6.82	6.86	6.82	0.00	10
7	Inga Gurgenidze	Georgia	57.99	33.11	25.88	6.46	6.18	6.82	-1.00	18
8	Maria Eliise Kaljuvere	Estonia	56.52	31.77	25.75	6.57	6.36	6.43	-1.00	15
9	Tsai Yu-Feng	Chinese Taipei	56.46	29.20	27.26	6.86	7.00	6.64	0.00	9
10	Anthea Gradinaru	Switzerland	55.78	31.93	24.85	6.32	6.18	6.18	-1.00	11
11	Iida Karhunen	Finland	55.04	29.39	25.65	6.50	6.39	6.39	0.00	13
12	Sophia Shifrin	Israel	49.54	26.75	22.79	5.89	5.61	5.64	0.00	6
13	Eve Dubecq	France	47.69	27.07	21.62	5.50	5.25	5.50	-1.00	2
14	Sherry Zhang	United States	45.97	22.40	25.57	6.61	6.11	6.50	-2.00	14
15	Léna Ekker	Hungary	44.93	23.37	21.56	5.46	5.50	5.25	0.00	3
16	Sofja Stepčenko	Latvia	44.77	24.25	21.52	5.50	5.25	5.43	-1.00	7
17	Sienna Kaczmarczyk	Australia	39.97	20.31	19.66	5.04	4.89	4.86	0.00	1
WD	Stefania Yakovleva	Cyprus	withdrew	withdrew from competition						5

=== Free skating ===
The free skating was held on 30 January at 14:30.

Pl.	Name	Nation	TSS	TES	PCS	CO	PR	SK	Ded	StN
1	Mao Shimada	Japan	125.94	64.78	62.16	7.71	7.61	7.96	-1.00	16
2	Shin Ji-a	South Korea	125.35	63.45	61.90	7.71	7.79	7.68	0.00	15
3	Sherry Zhang	United States	123.48	69.70	53.78	6.46	6.79	6.89	0.00	2
4	Kim Yu-seong	South Korea	117.89	62.81	56.08	7.07	7.04	6.89	-1.00	12
5	Yo Takagi	Japan	115.97	55.15	60.82	7.57	7.57	7.64	0.00	17
6	Inga Gurgenidze	Georgia	115.42	64.29	51.13	6.18	6.18	6.79	0.00	9
7	Iida Karhunen	Finland	111.84	60.90	50.94	6.50	6.29	6.29	0.00	6
8	Gao Shiqi	China	108.13	56.18	52.95	6.54	6.43	6.86	-1.00	13
9	Anthea Gradinaru	Switzerland	107.19	58.76	48.43	5.96	5.89	6.29	0.00	8
10	Sophia Shifrin	Israel	103.00	56.08	46.92	5.89	5.79	5.89	0.00	7
11	Tsai Yu-Feng	Chinese Taipei	100.18	47.93	52.25	6.57	6.61	6.39	0.00	10
12	Kaiya Ruiter	Canada	96.17	42.62	54.55	6.93	6.71	6.79	-1.00	14
13	Maria Eliise Kaljuvere	Estonia	93.39	46.66	48.73	6.21	5.79	6.25	-2.00	11
14	Léna Ekker	Hungary	90.83	45.83	45.00	5.71	5.64	5.50	0.00	5
15	Eve Dubecq	France	80.48	42.32	40.16	5.04	4.86	5.14	-2.00	4
16	Sofja Stepčenko	Latvia	76.02	38.82	37.20	4.46	4.43	5.04	0.00	1
17	Sienna Kaczmarczyk	Australia	72.49	35.96	36.53	4.68	4.46	4.54	0.00	3

=== Overall ===
Rank	Name	Nation	Total points	SP		FS	
1	Mao Shimada	Japan	196.99	1	71.05	1	125.94
2	Shin Ji-a	South Korea	191.83	3	66.48	2	125.35
3	Yo Takagi	Japan	183.20	2	67.23	5	115.97
4	Kim Yu-seong	South Korea	181.53	4	63.64	4	117.89
5	Inga Gurgenidze	Georgia	173.41	7	57.99	6	115.42
6	Sherry Zhang	United States	169.45	14	45.97	3	123.48
7	Gao Shiqi	China	168.41	5	60.28	8	108.13
8	Iida Karhunen	Finland	166.88	11	55.04	7	111.84
9	Anthea Gradinaru	Switzerland	162.97	10	55.78	9	107.19
10	Tsai Yu-Feng	Chinese Taipei	156.64	9	56.46	11	100.18
11	Kaiya Ruiter	Canada	154.95	6	58.78	12	96.17
12	Sophia Shifrin	Israel	152.54	12	49.54	10	103.00
13	Maria Eliise Kaljuvere	Estonia	149.91	8	56.52	13	93.39
14	Léna Ekker	Hungary	135.76	15	44.93	14	90.83
15	Eve Dubecq	France	128.17	13	47.69	15	80.48
16	Sofja Stepčenko	Latvia	120.79	16	44.77	16	76.02
17	Sienna Kaczmarczyk	Australia	112.46	17	39.97	17	72.49
WD	Stefania Yakovleva	Cyprus	withdrew	withdrew from competition			
