= Inga Gurgenidze =

Russian-Georgian figure skater (born 2009)

Personal information
- Native name: ინგა ზურაბის ასული გურგენიძე (Georgian) Инга Зурабовна Гургенидзе (Russian)
- Full name: Inga Zurabovna Gurgenidze
- Other names: Inga Nikitina
- Born: 23 April 2009 (age 17) Kazan, Tatarstan, Russia
- Height: 1.46 m (4 ft 9 1/2 in)

Figure skating career
- Country: Georgia (since 2022); Russia (until 2022)
- Coach: Liudmila Gafarova
- Skating club: RSSHOR of Figure Skating

Inga Zurabovna Gurgenidze (Georgian: ინგა ზურაბის ასული გურგენიძე, Russian: Инга Зурабовна Гургенидзе; born 23 April 2009), born Inga Zurabovna Nikitina, is a Russian-born Georgian figure skater who represents Georgia in women's singles. She is the 2022 JGP Italy bronze medalist, the 2022 Denis Ten Memorial junior champion, the 2022 Bosphorus Cup junior silver medalist, and the 2023 Dragon Trophy junior champion. She finished within the top ten at the 2023 World Junior Championships. She is the twenty-third woman in history to have successfully landed a triple Axel jump in competition.

== Personal life ==
Gurgenidze was born on 23 April 2009 in Kazan, Tatarstan, Russia. Part of her family is from Georgia, including her grandmother, who she used to visit every summer as a child.

She initially competed under her mother's surname, Nikitina, until the 2021–22 season when she changed it to her father's surname, Gurgenidze.

In addition, she has expressed interest in learning the English and Georgian languages. Gurgenidze's figure skating idols are Yulia Lipnitskaia, Evgenia Medvedeva, and Elizaveta Tuktamysheva.

== Career ==
=== Early career ===
Gurgenidze began figure skating in 2013 and has been coached by Liudmila Gafarova since a very young age.

She competed at the 2022 Russian Junior Championships, finishing in fifteenth place.

=== 2022–23 season: Debut for Georgia, JGP Medal ===
In August 2022, it was confirmed that Russian-born Gurgenidze would be representing Georgia in international competition, having previously skated for Russia. She made her international debut on the Junior Grand Prix series. She began her season with a fourth-place finish at 2022 JGP Latvia. At her second event, Gurgenidze won the bronze medal at the 2022 JGP Italy.

Subsequently, Gurgenidze went onto win gold at the 2022 Denis Ten Memorial Challenge, silver at the 2022 Bosphorus Cup and another gold at the 2023 Dragon Trophy. She finished the season at the 2023 World Junior Championships in Calgary, Alberta. After placing a disappointing nineteenth in the short program, Gurgenidze skated a solid free program, placing seventh in that segment of the competition and elevating her to finish ninth place overall.

=== 2023–24 season: Winter Youth Olympics ===
In her second Junior Grand Prix season, Gurgenidze came ninth at the 2023 JGP Hungary and sixth at the 2023 JGP Armenia. She defended her gold medal at the 2023 Denis Ten Memorial Challenge, before going onto win gold at the 2023 Bosphorus Cup.

Gurgenidze represented Georgia in the women's event at the 2024 Winter Youth Olympics in Gangwon finishing in fifth place. At the 2024 World Junior Championships, she placed twelfth.

=== 2024–25 season ===
During the off-season, Gurgenidze worked with Russian choreographer, Sergey Plishkin, on her free skate to music from the film, Dancer in the Dark. Regarding the program's concept, Gurgenidze explained that she plays a blind woman dancing in the dark and moving her soul while still unable to see. She began the season by competing on the 2024-25 ISU Junior Grand Prix circuit, finishing fifth at 2024 JGP Turkey. At her second Junior Grand Prix event, 2024 JGP China, Gurgenidze's coach Liudmila Gafarova was unable to attend due to visa issues. Gurgenidze placed thirteenth in the short program but subsequently skated a solid free skate that included a clean triple Axel. She would finish third in that segment of the competition and finish sixth overall. In late November, Gurgenidze competed on the junior level at the 2024 NRW Trophy where she took the gold medal.

Finishing the season at the 2025 World Junior Championships in Debrecen, Gurgenidze placed second in the short program with a score of 67.47. “I feel really good,” she said after the short program. “I skated my best today and I skated with confidence. Skating at the European Youth Olympic Festival in Georgia really helped me, and competing in Georgia was such a big pleasure. It also gave me the confidence that I can win.” She received a silver small medal for the segment. She struggled during the free skate, placing eleventh in that segment and dropping to sixth place overall.

=== 2025–26 season ===
Gurgenidze opened her season in October by finishing sixth at 2025 JGP United Arab Emirates.

In November, Inga won the silver medal at the 2025 Bosphorus Cup. In January, she also won silver at 2026 Crystal Skate and gold at 2026 Dragon Trophy just one week later.

At the 2026 World Junior Championships, Inga finished 6th overall. “I feel mixed emotions about today,” she said after the free skate. “Compared to previous competitions, it was definitely better and also compared to last season it was better. So, it is mixed feelings, bittersweet.”

=== 2026–27 season: Senior debut ===
Gurgenidze began her season at the Junior Grand Prix in Turkey placing fifth overall. She subsequently finished eighth at the Junior Grand Prix in Georgia.

Gurgenidze made her senior international debut at the 2026 Trialeti Trophy in Georgia. She concluded the event in sixth place overall.

== Programs ==
| Season | Short program | Free skating | Exhibition |
|---|---|---|---|
| 2026–2027 | Life and Death by Moby and Alexander Balanescu | Vivo Tango; Volver by Maxime Rodriguez | |
| 2025–2026 | Dog Days Are Over by Florence and the Machine choreo. by Ilona Bikmetova | Alchemy; A Little Bit Closer by Johnny Hollow choreo. by Ilona Bikmetova | |
| 2024–2025 | Tango Time by Atomic Overture choreo. by Ivan Volobuev | Dancer in the Dark; 107 Steps by Björk, Siobhan Fallon, & Vince Mendoza; Cvalda by Björk, Catherine Deneuve, & Vince Mendoza choreo. by Sergey Plishkin | |
| 2023–2024 | Winter (from The Four Seasons) by Antonio Vivaldi performed by Ulytau choreo. by Evgeni Ilin | Memphisto's Lullaby by Yair Albeg, Or Kribos; Breathing Under Water; Dissociative Identity Disorder (from Frightmare) by Ghostwriter choreo. by Ilona Bikmetova | |
| 2022–2023 | Sweet Dreams (Are Made of This) performed by Winati, Moonshine, Bellman ft. Louise CS; Sweet Dreams (Are Made of This) by Eurythmics choreo. by Ilona Bikmetova | Memphisto's Lullaby by Yair Albeg, Or Kribos; Breathing Under Water; Dissociative Identity Disorder (from Frightmare) by Ghostwriter choreo. by Ilona Bikmetova | Temperature (DJ Kantik Club Mix) by Sean Paul; Tokyo Drift (from Fast & Furious) by Teriyaki Boyz choreo. by Ilona Bikmetova; The Devil You Know by Kovacs choreo. by Ilona Bikmetova |
| 2021–2022 | Waltz (from Giselle) by Adolphe Adam performed by Alexander Kopylov & Orchestra of the Bolshoi Theatre choreo. by Ilona Bikmetova | Sweet Dreams (Are Made of This) performed by Tanghetto; Sweet Dreams (Are Made of This) by Eurythmics choreo. by Ilona Bikmetova | |

== Competitive highlights ==
- JGP – Event of the ISU Junior Grand Prix Series
- TBD – Assigned
- C – Cancelled

=== For Georgia ===
Competition placements at senior level
| Season | 2026–27 |
|---|---|
| CS Trialeti Trophy | 6th |
| CS Budapest Trophy | 18th |

Competition placements at junior level
| Season | 2022–23 | 2023–24 | 2024–25 | 2025–26 | 2026–27 |
|---|---|---|---|---|---|
| Winter Youth Olympics | | 5th | | | |
| World Junior Championships | 9th | 12th | 6th | 6th | |
| JGP Armenia | | 6th | | | |
| JGP China | | | 6th | | |
| JGP Georgia | | | | | 8th |
| JGP Hungary | | 9th | | | |
| JGP Italy | 3rd | | | | |
| JGP Latvia | 4th | | | | |
| JGP Turkey | | | 5th | | 5th |
| JGP United Arab Emirates | | | | 6th | |
| Crystal Skate | | | | 2nd | |
| Denis Ten Memorial | 1st | 1st | | | |
| Dragon Trophy | 1st | | | 1st | |
| Ephesus Cup | | | 2nd | | |
| European Youth Olympic Festival | | | 1st | | |
| NRW Trophy | | | 1st | | |
| Bosphorus Cup | 2nd | 1st | 2nd | 2nd | |

=== For Russia ===
Competition placements at junior level
| Season | 2021–22 |
|---|---|
| Russian Championships | 15th |
| Russian Cup Final | 10th |

== Detailed results ==
ISU personal best scores in the +5/-5 GOE System
| Segment | Type | Score | Event |
|---|---|---|---|
| Total | **TSS** | **190.52** | 2022 JGP Italy |
| Short program | **TSS** | **67.47** | 2025 World Junior Championships |
| Short program | TES | 38.57 | 2025 World Junior Championships |
| Short program | PCS | 28.90 | 2025 World Junior Championships |
| Free skating | **TSS** | **128.69** | 2024 JGP China |
| Free skating | TES | 74.72 | 2024 JGP China |
| Free skating | PCS | 58.92 | 2022 JGP Italy |

Personal best highlighted in bold.

=== For Georgia ===
==== Senior level ====
Results in the 2026–27 season
| Date | Event | SP | | FS | | Total | |
| Date | Event | P | Score | P | Score | P | Score |
|---|---|---|---|---|---|---|---|
| 1–4 October, 2026 | (Georgia (country)) 2026 CS Trialeti Trophy | 5 | 63.66 | 6 | 113.89 | 6 | 177.55 |
| 15–18 October, 2026 | (Hungary) 2026 CS Budapest Trophy | 4 | 63.71 | 26 | 81.73 | 18 | 145.44 |

==== Junior level ====
Results in the 2026–27 season
| Date | Event | SP | | FS | | Total | |
| Date | Event | P | Score | P | Score | P | Score |
|---|---|---|---|---|---|---|---|
| Sep 17–19, 2026 | 2026 JGP Turkey | 8 | 59.57 | 5 | 110.15 | 5 | 169.72 |
| Sep 24–26, 2026 | (Georgia (country)) 2026 JGP Georgia | 7 | 64.77 | 11 | 106.35 | 8 | 171.12 |

Results in the 2025-26 season
| Date | Event | SP | | FS | | Total | |
| Date | Event | P | Score | P | Score | P | Score |
|---|---|---|---|---|---|---|---|
| Oct 8-11, 2025 | (Turkey) 2025 JGP United Arab Emirates | 7 | 56.26 | 4 | 111.97 | 6 | 168.23 |
| Nov 24-30, 2025 | (Turkey) 2025 Bosphorus Cup | 3 | 62.52 | 1 | 111.85 | 2 | 174.37 |
| Jan 14-19, 2026 | 2026 Crystal Skate of Romania | 1 | 62.25 | 3 | 94.93 | 2 | 157.18 |
| Jan 23-25, 2026 | (Slovenia) 2026 Dragon Trophy | 1 | 65.32 | 1 | 124.46 | 1 | 189.78 |
| Mar 3-8, 2026 | (Estonia) 2026 World Junior Championships | 5 | 64.28 | 10 | 118.32 | 6 | 182.60 |

2024–25 season
| Date | Event | SP | FS | Total |
|---|---|---|---|---|
| Feb. 25 – Mar. 2, 2025 | 2025 World Junior Championships | 2; **67.47** | 11; 115.57 | 6; 183.04 |
| November 11–17, 2024 | 2024 NRW Trophy | 1; 65.30 | 1; 112.89 | 1; 178.19 |
| October 9–12, 2024 | 2024 JGP China | 13; 50.45 | 3; **128.69** | 6; 179.14 |
| September 18–21, 2024 | 2024 JGP Turkey | 6; 59.93 | 5; 111.03 | 5; 170.96 |
2023–24 season
| Date | Event | SP | FS | Total |
| Feb. 26 – Mar. 3, 2024 | 2024 World Junior Championships | 7; 62.28 | 16; 110.59 | 12; 172.87 |
| January 28–30, 2024 | 2024 Winter Youth Olympics | 7; 57.99 | 6; 115.42 | 5; 173.41 |
| Nov. 27 – Dec. 3, 2022 | 2023 Bosphorus Cup | 1; 64.49 | 1; 111.83 | 1; 176.52 |
| November 2–5, 2023 | 2023 Denis Ten Memorial | 3; 54.22 | 1; 109.54 | 1; 163.76 |
| October 4–7, 2023 | 2023 JGP Armenia | 6; 55.47 | 5; 110.43 | 6; 165.90 |
| September 20–23, 2023 | 2023 JGP Hungary | 13; 54.32 | 8; 105.53 | 9; 159.85 |
2022–23 season
| Date | Event | SP | FS | Total |
| Feb. 27 – Mar. 5, 2023 | 2023 World Junior Championships | 19; 52.02 | 7; 120.48 | 9; 172.50 |
| February 9–12, 2023 | 2023 Dragon Trophy | 4; 53.73 | 1; 124.09 | 1; 177.82 |
| Nov. 29 – Dec. 3, 2022 | 2023 Bosphorus Cup | 2; 52.58 | 1; 118.47 | 2; 171.05 |
| October 26–29, 2022 | 2022 Denis Ten Memorial | 1; 63.62 | 1; 110.56 | 1; 174.18 |
| October 12–15, 2022 | 2022 JGP Italy | 4; 63.04 | 3; 127.48 | 3; **190.52** |
| September 7–10, 2022 | 2022 JGP Latvia | 5; 58.80 | 4; 121.48 | 4; 180.28 |

=== For Russia ===
2021–22 season
| Date | Event | SP | FS | Total |
|---|---|---|---|---|
| February 26–March 2, 2022 | Russian Cup Final | 6 63.82 | 11 103.62 | 10 167.44 |
| December 22–24, 2021 | 2022 Russian Championships | 15 61.63 | 14 111.80 | 15 173.43 |
| November 8–12, 2021 | Russian Cup Stage 4 | 5 64.48 | 2 131.44 | 3 195.92 |
| October 10–14, 2021 | Russian Cup Stage 2 | 4 62.48 | 8 111.31 | 6 173.79 |
