= 2025–26 ISU Junior Grand Prix =

Figure skating competition series

- Type: ISU Junior Grand Prix
- Date: August 20 – December 7, 2025
- Season: 2025–26
- Previous: 2024–25 ISU Junior Grand Prix
- Next: 2026–27 ISU Junior Grand Prix

The 2025–26 ISU Junior Grand Prix was a series of junior international competitions organized by the International Skating Union that was held from August 2025 through December 2025. It was the junior-level complement to the 2025–26 ISU Grand Prix of Figure Skating. Medals were awarded in men's singles, women's singles, pair skating, and ice dance. Skaters earned points based on their placement at each event, and the top six in each discipline qualified to compete at the 2025–26 Junior Grand Prix Final in Nagoya, Japan.

== Competitions ==
The ISU Junior Grand Prix of Figure Skating (JGP) was established by the International Skating Union (ISU) in 1997 and consists of a series of seven international figure skating competitions exclusively for junior-level skaters. The locations of the Junior Grand Prix events change every year. While all seven competitions feature the men's, women's, and ice dance events, only four competitions each season feature the pairs event. This season, the series will include the following events.

Date	Event	Location	Notes	Ref.
August 20–23	2025 JGP Latvia	Riga, Latvia		
August 27–30	2025 JGP Turkey	Ankara, Turkey		
September 3–6	2025 JGP Italy	Varese, Italy	No pairs	
September 9–13	2025 JGP Thailand	Bangkok, Thailand		
September 24–27	2025 JGP Azerbaijan	Baku, Azerbaijan	No pairs	
October 1–4	2025 JGP Poland	Gdansk, Poland		
October 8–11	2025 JGP United Arab Emirates	Abu Dhabi, United Arab Emirates	No pairs	
December 4–7	(Japan) 2025–26 Junior Grand Prix Final	Nagoya, Japan		

== Entries ==
Skaters are eligible to compete on the junior-level circuit if they are at least 13 years old before July 1 of the respective season, and if they have not yet turned 19 (for single skaters, and females in ice dance and pair skating) or 21 (for males in ice dance and pair skating). Competitors are chosen by their respective skating federations. The number of entries allotted to each ISU member nation in each discipline is determined by their results at the prior 2025 World Junior Figure Skating Championships.

Singles and ice dance
Entries	Men	Women	Ice dance
Two entries in seven events	Japan; Slovakia; South Korea	Japan; South Korea; United States	Germany; Italy; United States
One entry in seven events	Estonia; Germany; United States	Estonia; France; Georgia	Canada; France; Ukraine
One entry in six events	China; Israel; New Zealand; Sweden	Australia; China; Finland; Switzerland	Belgium; Slovakia; Switzerland; Japan
One entry in five events	Belgium; Canada; France; Hong Kong; Italy; Switzerland	Armenia; Azerbaijan; Canada; Cyprus; Hungary; Israel; Italy; Latvia; Netherlands	Austria; Czech Republic; Great Britain; Turkey
One entry in four events	Czech Republic; Spain; Finland; Kazakhstan; Ukraine	Czech Republic; Hong Kong; Kazakhstan; Lithuania	China; Estonia; Poland; Spain; Sweden
One entry in three events	Armenia; Austria; Bulgaria; Georgia; Great Britain; Hungary; Latvia; Poland; Slovenia; Turkey	Austria; Bulgaria; Chinese Taipei; Croatia; Germany; Great Britain; Kyrgyzstan; New Zealand; Poland; Slovenia; Spain; Slovakia; Sweden; Thailand; Ukraine	

- If not listed above, one entry in two events is allowed.
- Host federations may enter up to three spots per discipline.

Pairs
Entries	Pairs
Three entries in four events	Canada; Georgia; Switzerland; Ukraine
Two entries in four events	China; France; Italy; Japan; Spain; Slovakia; United States
One entry in four events	Czech Republic; Great Britain; Hungary

- If not listed above, one entry in three events is allowed.
- Host federations have an unlimited number of entries.

== Medal summary ==
=== Men's singles ===
Men's medalists
Competition	Gold	Silver	Bronze	Ref.
JGP Latvia	(Japan) Rio Nakata	(Canada) Grayson Long	(Germany) Genrikh Gartung	
JGP Turkey	(South Korea) Seo Min-kyu	(Japan) Sena Takahashi	(United States) Lucius Kazanecki	
JGP Italy	(Japan) Taiga Nishino	(South Korea) Choi Ha-bin	(Japan) Shun Uemura	
JGP Thailand	(Japan) Rio Nakata	(United States) Patrick Blackwell	(New Zealand) Yanhao Li	
JGP Azerbaijan	(South Korea) Seo Min-kyu	(Belgium) Denis Krouglov	(United States) Caleb Farrington	
JGP Poland	(South Korea) Choi Ha-bin	(Japan) Taiga Nishino	(Germany) Genrikh Gartung	
JGP United Arab Emirates	(United States) Lucius Kazanecki	(Belgium) Denis Krouglov	(Japan) Sena Takahashi	
(Japan) Junior Grand Prix Final	(South Korea) Seo Min-kyu	(Japan) Rio Nakata	(United States) Lucius Kazanecki	

=== Women's singles ===
Women's medalists
Competition	Gold	Silver	Bronze	Ref.
JGP Latvia	(Japan) Mei Okada	(South Korea) Huh Ji-yu	(Switzerland) Elisabeth Dibbern	
JGP Turkey	(Japan) Mayuko Oka	(South Korea) Kim Yu-jae	(United States) Sophie Joline von Felten	
JGP Italy	(Japan) Sumika Kanazawa	(South Korea) Youn Seo-jin	(China) Wang Yihan	
JGP Thailand	(Japan) Mao Shimada	(Japan) Mei Okada	(South Korea) Hwang Jeong-yul	
JGP Azerbaijan	(South Korea) Kim Yu-seong	(Japan) Mayuko Oka	(Israel) Sophia Shifrin	
JGP Poland	(South Korea) Kim Yu-jae	(Slovakia) Alica Lengyelova	(United States) Sophie Joline von Felten	
JGP United Arab Emirates	(Japan) Mao Shimada	(Australia) Hana Bath	(Israel) Sophia Shifrin	
(Japan) Junior Grand Prix Final	(Japan) Mao Shimada	(South Korea) Kim Yu-seong	(Japan) Mei Okada	

=== Pairs ===
Pairs medalists
Competition	Gold	Silver	Bronze	Ref.
JGP Latvia	(Canada); Ava Kemp; Yohnatan Elizarov	(China); Zhang Xuanqi; Feng Wenqiang	(United States); Naomi Williams; Lachlan Lewer	
JGP Turkey	(Canada); Ava Kemp; Yohnatan Elizarov	(China); Guo Rui; Zhang Yiwen	(Canada); Julia Quattrocchi; Étienne Lacasse	
JGP Thailand	(China); Guo Rui; Zhang Yiwen	(Canada); Jazmine Desrochers; Kieran Thrasher	(United States); Sofia Jarmoc; Luke Witkowski	
JGP Poland	(China); Zhang Xuanqi; Feng Wenqiang	(Canada); Jazmine Desrochers; Kieran Thrasher	(China); Chen Yuxuan; Dong Yinbo	
(Japan) Junior Grand Prix Final	(China); Guo Rui; Zhang Yiwen	(China); Zhang Xuanqi; Feng Wenqiang	(Canada); Ava Kemp; Yohnatan Elizarov	

=== Ice dance ===
Ice dance medalists
Competition	Gold	Silver	Bronze	Ref.
JGP Latvia	(Canada); Layla Veillon; Alexander Brandys	(France); Dania Mouaden; Theo Bigot	(United States); Jasmine Robertson; Chase Rohner	
JGP Turkey	(Ukraine); Iryna Pidgaina; Artem Koval	(Canada); Charlie Anderson; Cayden Dawson	(France); Lea Hienne; Louis Varescon	
JGP Italy	(United States); Jasmine Robertson; Chase Rohner	(France); Ambre Perrier Gianesini; Samuel Blanc Klaperman	(Canada); Summer Homick; Nicholas Buelow	
JGP Thailand	(United States); Hana Maria Aboian; Daniil Veselukhin	(Canada); Charlie Anderson; Cayden Dawson	(France); Lea Hienne; Louis Varescon	
JGP Azerbaijan	(France); Ambre Perrier Gianesini; Samuel Blanc Klaperman	(Italy); Zoe Bianchi; Daniel Basile	(Canada); Summer Homick; Nicholas Buelow	
JGP Poland	(Ukraine); Iryna Pidgaina; Artem Koval	(Canada); Layla Veillon; Alexander Brandys	(Italy); Arianna Soldati; Nicholas Tagliabue	
JGP United Arab Emirates	(United States); Hana Maria Aboian; Daniil Veselukhin	(France); Dania Mouaden; Theo Bigot	(Italy); Zoe Bianchi; Daniel Basile	
(Japan) Junior Grand Prix Final	(United States); Hana Maria Aboian; Daniil Veselukhin	(France); Ambre Perrier Gianesini; Samuel Blanc Klaperman	(Ukraine); Iryna Pidgaina; Artem Koval	

=== Medal table ===
Rank	Nation	Gold	Silver	Bronze	Total
1	Japan	9	5	3	17
2	South Korea	6	5	1	12
3	United States	5	1	8	14
4	Canada	3	6	4	13
5	China	3	3	2	8
6	Ukraine	2	0	1	3
7	France	1	4	2	7
8	Belgium	0	2	0	2
9	Italy	0	1	2	3
10	Australia	0	1	0	1
10	Slovakia	0	1	0	1
12	Germany	0	0	2	2
12	Israel	0	0	2	2
14	New Zealand	0	0	1	1
14	Switzerland	0	0	1	1
Totals (15 entries)		29	29	29	87

== Qualification ==
At each event, skaters earn points toward qualification for the Junior Grand Prix Final. Following the seventh event, the top six highest-scoring skaters/teams advance to the Final. The points earned per placement are as follows:

Placement	Singles	Pairs/Ice dance
1st	15	15
2nd	13	13
3rd	11	11
4th	9	9
5th	7	7
6th	5	5
7th	4	4
8th	3	3
9th	2	—N/a
10th	1	—N/a

There are seven tie-breakers in cases of a tie in overall points:

1. Highest placement at an event. If a skater placed 1st and 3rd, the tiebreaker is the 1st place, and that beats a skater who placed 2nd in both events.
2. Highest combined total scores in both events. If a skater earned 200 points at one event and 250 at a second, that skater would win in the second tie-break over a skater who earned 200 points at one event and 150 at another.
3. Participated in two events.
4. Highest combined scores in the free skating/free dance portion of both events.
5. Highest individual score in the free skating/free dance portion from one event.
6. Highest combined scores in the short program/short dance of both events.
7. Highest number of total participants at the events.

If a tie remains, it is considered unbreakable and the tied skaters all advanced to the Junior Grand Prix Final.

=== Qualification standings ===
Pts.	Men	Women	Pairs	Ice dance
30	(Japan); Rio Nakata	(Japan); Mao Shimada	(Canada); Ava Kemp; Yohnathan Elizarov	(United States); Hana Maria Aboian; Daniil Veselukhin
30	(South Korea); Seo Min-kyu	—N/a	—N/a	(Ukraine); Iryna Pidgaina; Artem Koval
28	(South Korea); Choi Ha-bin	(South Korea); Kim Yu-jae	(China); Zhang Xuanqi; Feng Wenqiang	(Canada); Layla Veillon; Alexander Brandys
28	(Japan); Taiga Nishino	(Japan); Mayuko Oka	(China); Guo Rui; Zhang Yiwen	(France); Ambre Perrier Gianesini; Samuel Blanc Klaperman
28	—N/a	(Japan); Mei Okada	—N/a	—N/a
26	(United States); Lucius Kazanecki	—N/a	(Canada); Jazmine Desrochers; Kieran Thrasher	(United States); Jasmine Robertson; Chase Rohner
26	(Belgium); Denis Krouglov	—N/a	—N/a	(France); Dania Mouaden; Théo Bigot
26	—N/a	—N/a	—N/a	(Canada); Charlie Anderson; Cayden Dawson
24	(Japan); Sena Takahashi	(Japan); Sumika Kanazawa	—N/a	(Italy); Zoe Bianchi; Daniel Basile
22	(United States); Patrick Blackwell	(South Korea); Kim Yu-seong	—N/a	(Canada); Summer Homick; Nicholas Buelow
22	(Germany); Genrikh Gartung	(Australia); Hana Bath	—N/a	(France); Lea Hienne; Louis Varescon
22	—N/a	(South Korea); Youn Seo-jin	—N/a	—N/a
22	—N/a	(United States); Sophie Joline von Felten	—N/a	—N/a
22	—N/a	(Israel); Sophia Shifrin	—N/a	—N/a
20	(Canada); Grayson Long	(China); Wang Yihan	(Canada); Julia Quattrocchi; Étienne Lacasse	(Italy); Arianna Soldati; Nicholas Tagliabue
20	(Japan); Shun Uemura	—N/a	(China); Chen Yuxuan; Dong Yinbo	—N/a
18	(New Zealand); Yanhao Li	(Switzerland); Elisabeth Dibbern	(United States); Naomi Williams; Lachlan Lewer	(France); Lou Koch; Lucas Chataignoux
18	(United States); Caleb Farrington	—N/a	(United States); Reagan Moss; Jakub Galbuvy	—N/a
18	(Japan); Daiya Ebihara	—N/a	—N/a	—N/a
16	(Japan); Ryoto Mori	(Slovakia); Alica Lengyelová	—N/a	—N/a
15	—N/a	—N/a	—N/a	—N/a
14	—N/a	(Japan); Kaoruko Wada	(United States); Sofia Jarmoc; Luke Witkowski	(Germany); Alexia Kruk; Jan Eisenhaber
14	—N/a	(Estonia); Elina Goidina	—N/a	(United States); Michelle Deych; Ryan Hu
14	—N/a	(Switzerland); Leandra Tzimpoukakis	—N/a	(United States); Annelise Stapert; Maxim Korotcov
13	—N/a	(South Korea); Huh Ji-yu	—N/a	—N/a
13	—N/a	—N/a	—N/a	—N/a
12	(Slovakia); Lukáš Václavík	—N/a	(France); Louise Ehrhard; Matthis Pellegris	—N/a
12	—N/a	—N/a	(France); Clélia Liget-Latus; Allan Daniel Fisher	—N/a
11	(China); Tonghe Tian	(South Korea); Hwang Jeong-youl	—N/a	—N/a
10	—N/a	(Japan); Haruna Murakami	—N/a	(Austria); Anita Straub; Andreas Straub
10	—N/a	—N/a	—N/a	(Turkey); Irmak Yucel; Danil Pak
9	(Turkey); Furkan Emre Incel	(Estonia); Maria Eliise Kaljuvere	—N/a	(Belgium); Sofiia Beznosikova; Max Leleu
9	(Ukraine); Yehor Kurtsev	—N/a	—N/a	(Canada); Aurea Cinçon-Debout; Earl Jesse Celestino
9	—N/a	—N/a	—N/a	(Czech Republic); Diane Sznajder; Jáchym Novák
9	—N/a	—N/a	—N/a	(Czech Republic); Eliska Zakova; Filip Mencl
8	—N/a	—N/a	(Switzerland); Seraina Tscharner; Laurin Wiederkehr	—N/a
7	(Thailand); Hiro Kaewtathip	(United States); Annika Chao	(China); Hu Mujun; Wang Zexuan	(China); Yin Shanjie; Yang Shirui
7	(Czech Republic); Tadeáš Václavík	(China); Jin Shuxian	(France); Romane Télémaque; Lucas Coulon	(United States); Grace Fischer; Luke Fischer
7	(Switzerland); Ean Weiler	(Japan); Ikura Kushida	—N/a	(United States); Jane Calhoun; Mark Zheltyshev
7	(Finland); Matias Lindfors	(South Korea); Ko Nae-yeon	—N/a	(China); Gao Yuxi; Ji Zhouhao
7	(Israel); Nikita Sheiko	—N/a	—N/a	—N/a
6	—N/a	(France); Stefania Gladki	—N/a	—N/a
6	—N/a	(Azerbaijan); Arina Kalugina	—N/a	—N/a
5	(Hong Kong); Jiarui Li	(South Korea); Lee Hyo-won	(Czech Republic); Alžběta Kvíderová; Jindřich Klement	(Germany); Nelly Elisa Hemcke; Artyom Sladkov
5	(United States); Nicholas Brooks	(United States); Angela Shao	(Spain); Megan Yudin; Patrizio Romano Rossi López	—N/a
5	(Canada); Anthony Paradis	(South Korea); Joo Hye-won	—N/a	—N/a
5	(China); Lu Boren	(Georgia (country)); Inga Gurgenidze	—N/a	—N/a
5	(Switzerland); Gion Schmid	—N/a	—N/a	—N/a
5	(Kazakhstan); Artur Smagulov	—N/a	—N/a	—N/a
5	(Austria); Maksym Petrychenko	—N/a	—N/a	—N/a
4	(United States); Aleksandr Fegan	(Switzerland); Valeriya Ezhova	(Italy); Irina Napolitano; Edoardo Comi	(Hong Kong); Xing Yuxuan; Chau Han Wan
4	(Latvia); Janis Znotins	(Japan); Yo Takagi	(Slovakia); Laura Hečková; Alex Války	(United States); Clara Fugate; Warren Fugate
4	—N/a	(United States); Kaya Tiernan	(Germany); Anfisa Sevastianova; Lukas Gneiding	(Japan); Kaho Yamashita; Yuto Nagata
4	—N/a	(Germany); Anna Gerke	—N/a	—N/a
3	(Ukraine); Fedir Babenko	(Italy); Amanda Ghezzo	(Canada); Beau Callahan; Vladimir Furman	(United Kingdom); Ashlie Slatter; Louis Gregory
3	(Switzerland); Sandro De Angelo	(United States); Sofia Bezkorovainaya	(United States); Addyson McDanold; Aaron Felberbaum	(United States); Anaelle Kouevi; Yann Homawoo
3	(New Zealand); Vinceman Chong	(Canada); Victoria Barakhtina	—N/a	(Ukraine); Tetiana Bielodonova; Ivan Kachur
3	—N/a	(United States); Rachel Samiri	—N/a	(China); Ding Xinai; Zheng Hanchong
3	—N/a	—N/a	—N/a	(United States); Sophia Feige; Wiles Middlekauff
3	—N/a	—N/a	(Canada); Victoria Carandiuc; Andrei Carandiuc	—N/a
2	(Hong Kong); Jarvis Ho	(Belgium); Lilou Remeysen	—N/a	
2	(China); Li Yingrui	(Netherlands); Angel Delevaque	—N/a	
2	(United States); Lorenzo Elano	(Latvia); Kira Baranovska	—N/a	
2	(Georgia (country)); Konstantin Supatashvili	(Netherlands); Lucca Dijkhuizen	—N/a	
2	(Hong Kong); Simon Sun	(United States); Sherry Zhang	—N/a	
1	(Estonia); Vladislav Churakov	(United Kingdom); Alice Smith	—N/a	
1	(Turkey); Mehmet Cenkay Karlikli	(Lithuania); Milana Siniavskyte	—N/a	
1	(Canada); Edward Vasii	(United States); Jessica Jurka	—N/a	
1	(United Kingdom); Edward Solovyov	(Germany); Diana Alexandra Ziesecke	—N/a	
1	(Canada); David Bondar	(South Korea); Kim Min-song	—N/a	
1	(Germany); Michelangelo Caprano	—N/a	—N/a	

=== Qualifiers ===
No.	Men	Women	Pairs	Ice dance
1	(Japan); Rio Nakata	(Japan); Mao Shimada	(Canada); Ava Kemp; Yohnathan Elizarov	(United States); Hana Maria Aboian; Daniil Veselukhin
2	(South Korea); Seo Min-kyu	(South Korea); Kim Yu-jae	(China); Zhang Xuanqi; Feng Wenqiang	(Ukraine); Iryna Pidgaina; Artem Koval
3	(South Korea); Choi Ha-bin	(Japan); Mayuko Oka	(China); Guo Rui; Zhang Yiwen	(Canada); Layla Veillon; Alexander Brandys
4	(Japan); Taiga Nishino	(Japan); Mei Okada	(Canada); Jazmine Desrochers; Kieran Thrasher	(France); Ambre Perrier Gianesini; Samuel Blanc Klaperman
5	(United States); Lucius Kazanecki	(Japan); Sumika Kanazawa	(Canada); Julia Quattrocchi; Étienne Lacasse	(United States); Jasmine Robertson; Chase Rohner
6	(Belgium); Denis Krouglov	(South Korea); Kim Yu-seong	(China); Chen Yuxuan; Dong Yinbo	(France); Dania Mouaden; Theo Bigot

Alternates

No.	Men	Women	Pairs	Ice dance
1	(Japan); Sena Takahashi	(Australia); Hana Bath	(United States); Naomi Williams; Lachlan Lewer	(Canada); Charlie Anderson; Cayden Dawson
2	(United States); Patrick Blackwell	(South Korea); Youn Seo-jin	(United States); Reagan Moss; Jakub Galbuvy	(Italy); Zoe Bianchi; Daniel Basile
3	(Germany); Genrikh Gartung	(United States); Sophie Joline von Felten	(United States); Sofia Jarmoc; Luke Witkowski	(Canada); Summer Homick; Nicholas Buelow

== Top scores ==
=== Men's singles ===
Top 10 best scores in the men's combined total
No.	Skater	Nation	Score	Event
1	Rio Nakata	Japan	246.94	2025 JGP Latvia
2	Seo Min-kyu	South Korea	243.27	2025 JGP Turkey
3	Taiga Nishino	Japan	233.50	2025 JGP Italy
4	Choi Ha-bin	South Korea	232.19	2025 JGP Italy
5	Sena Takahashi	Japan	225.84	2025 JGP Turkey
6	Patrick Blackwell	United States	222.17	2025 JGP Thailand
7	Grayson Long	Canada	221.71	2025 JGP Latvia
8	Lucius Kazanecki	United States	219.63	2025 JGP United Arab Emirates
9	Genrikh Gartung	Germany	219.14	2025 JGP Poland
10	Denis Krouglov	Belgium	218.19	2025 JGP United Arab Emirates

Top 10 best scores in the men's short program
No.	Skater	Nation	Score	Event
1	Rio Nakata	Japan	88.72	2025 JGP Latvia
2	Sena Takahashi	Japan	82.87	2025 JGP Turkey
3	Seo Min-kyu	South Korea	82.67	2025 JGP Azerbaijan
4	Taiga Nishino	Japan	78.81	2025 JGP Poland
5	Grayson Long	Canada	78.65	2025 JGP Latvia
6	Choi Ha-bin	South Korea	78.53	2025 JGP Poland
7	Yanhao Li	New Zealand	78.18	2025 JGP Latvia
8	Shun Uemura	Japan	77.30	2025 JGP United Arab Emirates
9	Taiga Nishino	Japan	76.57	2025 JGP Poland
10	Genrikh Gartung	Germany	75.94	2025 JGP Latvia

Top 10 best scores in the men's free skating
No.	Skater	Nation	Score	Event
1	Rio Nakata	Japan	162.64	2025 JGP Thailand
2	Seo Min-kyu	South Korea	161.81	2025 JGP Turkey
3	Taiga Nishino	Japan	157.43	2025 JGP Italy
4	Choi Ha-bin	South Korea	154.43	2025 JGP Italy
5	Patrick Blackwell	United States	147.94	2025 JGP Thailand
6	Lucius Kazanecki	United States	146.62	2025 JGP United Arab Emirates
7	Genrikh Gartung	Germany	146.45	2025 JGP Poland
8	Grayson Long	Canada	143.06	2025 JGP Latvia
9	Sena Takahashi	Japan	142.97	2025 JGP Turkey
10	Denis Krouglov	Belgium	142.89	2025 JGP United Arab Emirates

=== Women's singles ===
Top 10 best scores in the women's combined total
No.	Skater	Nation	Score	Event
1	Mao Shimada	Japan	201.17	2025 JGP United Arab Emirates
2	Kim Yu-jae	South Korea	199.86	2025 JGP Poland
3	Mayuko Oka	Japan	199.17	2025 JGP Turkey
4	Hana Bath	Australia	192.72	2025 JGP United Arab Emirates
5	Alica Lengyelova	Slovakia	191.53	2025 JGP Poland
6	Mei Okada	Japan	190.99	2025 JGP Thailand
7	Sophie Joline von Felten	United States	190.67	2025 JGP Poland
8	Sumika Kanazawa	Japan	188.41	2025 JGP Poland
9	Elisabeth Dibbern	Switzerland	188.41	2025 JGP Poland
10	Huh Ji-yu	South Korea	186.55	2025 JGP Latvia

Top 10 best scores in the women's short program
No.	Skater	Nation	Score	Event
1	Mao Shimada	Japan	70.36	2025 JGP Thailand
2	Mei Okada	Japan	68.38	2025 JGP Latvia
3	Sophie Joline von Felten	United States	68.17	2025 JGP Turkey
4	Mayuko Oka	Japan	68.03	2025 JGP Turkey
5	Huh Ji-yu	South Korea	65.84	2025 JGP Latvia
6	Sumika Kanazawa	Japan	65.37	2025 JGP Italy
7	Alica Lengyelova	Slovakia	64.77	2025 JGP Poland
8	Haruna Murakami	Japan	64.12	2025 JGP Turkey
9	Elina Goidina	Estonia	63.77	2025 JGP Latvia
10	Sophia Shifrin	Israel	63.25	2025 JGP United Arab Emirates

Top 10 best scores in the women's free skating
No.	Skater	Nation	Score	Event
1	Kim Yu-jae	South Korea	137.17	2025 JGP Poland
2	Mao Shimada	Japan	135.99	2025 JGP United Arab Emirates
3	Sophie Joline von Felten	United States	132.43	2025 JGP Poland
4	Mayuko Oka	Japan	131.14	2025 JGP Turkey
5	Hana Bath	Australia	129.74	2025 JGP United Arab Emirates
6	Alica Lengyelova	Slovakia	126.76	2025 JGP Poland
7	Kim Yu-seong	South Korea	126.31	2025 JGP Azerbaijan
8	Elisabeth Dibbern	Switzerland	125.42	2025 JGP Poland
9	Mei Okada	Japan	125.29	2025 JGP Thailand
10	Sumika Kanazawa	Japan	124.15	2025 JGP Poland

=== Pairs ===
Top 10 best scores in the pairs' combined total
No.	Team	Nation	Score	Event
1	Ava Kemp; Yohnathan Elizarov	Canada	179.43	2025 JGP Turkey
2	Zhang Xuanqi; Feng Wenqiang	China	169.76	2025 JGP Poland
3	Guo Rui; Zhang Yiwen	China	166.14	2025 JGP Turkey
4	Jazmine Desrochers; Kieran Thrasher	Canada	160.65	2025 JGP Thailand
5	Naomi Williams; Lachlan Lewer	United States	159.63	2025 JGP Latvia
6	Chen Yuxuan; Dong Yinbo	China	152.77	2025 JGP Poland
7	Julia Quattrocchi; Étienne Lacasse	Canada	150.45	2025 JGP Poland
8	Sofia Jarmoc; Luke Witkowski	United States	149.66	2025 JGP Thailand
9	Reagan Moss; Jakub Galbuvy	United States	146.74	2025 JGP Thailand
10	Louise Ehrhard; Matthis Pellegris	France	143.14	2025 JGP Poland

Top 10 best scores in the pairs' short program
No.	Team	Nation	Score	Event
1	Guo Rui; Zhang Yiwen	China	64.85	2025 JGP Turkey
2	Ava Kemp; Yohnathan Elizarov	Canada	63.94	2025 JGP Turkey
3	Zhang Xuanqi; Feng Wenqiang	China	63.57	2025 JGP Poland
4	Jazmine Desrochers; Kieran Thrasher	Canada	59.04	2025 JGP Thailand
5	Naomi Williams; Lachlan Lewer	United States	58.13	2025 JGP Latvia
6	Reagan Moss; Jakub Galbuvy	United States	55.25	2025 JGP Thailand
7	Sofia Jarmoc; Luke Witkowski	United States	55.00	2025 JGP Thailand
8	Julia Quattrocchi; Étienne Lacasse	Canada	54.51	2025 JGP Poland
9	Chen Yuxuan; Dong Yinbo	China	53.89	2025 JGP Poland
10	Louise Ehrhard; Matthis Pellegris	France	51.07	2025 JGP Thailand

Top 10 best scores in the pairs' free skating
No.	Team	Nation	Score	Event
1	Ava Kemp; Yohnathan Elizarov	Canada	115.49	2025 JGP Turkey
2	Zhang Xuanqi; Feng Wenqiang	China	105.54	2025 JGP Poland
3	Guo Rui; Zhang Yiwen	China	105.47	2025 JGP Thailand
4	Jazmine Desrochers; Kieran Thrasher	Canada	103.20	2025 JGP Poland
4	Naomi Williams; Lachlan Lewer	United States	101.50	2025 JGP Latvia
5	Chen Yuxuan; Dong Yinbo	China	98.88	2025 JGP Poland
6	Julia Quattrocchi; Étienne Lacasse	Canada	95.94	2025 JGP Poland
7	Sofia Jarmoc; Luke Witkowski	United States	94.66	2025 JGP Thailand
8	Louise Ehrhard; Matthis Pellegris	France	92.22	2025 JGP Poland
9	Reagan Moss; Jakub Galbuvy	United States	91.49	2025 JGP Thailand
10	Hu Mujun; Wang Zexuan	China	86.26	2025 JGP Turkey

=== Ice dance ===
Top 10 season's best scores in the combined total (ice dance)
No.	Team	Nation	Score	Event
1	Hana Maria Aboian; Daniil Veselukhin	United States	167.11	2025 JGP United Arab Emirates
2	Iryna Pidgaina; Artem Koval	Ukraine	164.13	2025 JGP Poland
3	Ambre Perrier Gianesini; Samuel Blanc Klaperman	France	162.21	2025 JGP Azerbaijan
4	Layla Veillon; Alexander Brandys	Canada	161.83	2025 JGP Latvia
5	Dania Mouaden; Theo Bigot	France	160.13	2025 JGP Latvia
6	Jasmine Robertson; Chase Rohner	United States	156.52	2025 JGP Italy
7	Charlie Anderson; Cayden Dawson	Canada	150.77	2025 JGP Thailand
8	Zoe Bianchi; Daniel Basile	Italy	149.64	2025 JGP Azerbaijan
9	Arianna Soldati; Nicholas Tagliabue	Italy	144.18	2025 JGP Poland
10	Summer Homick; Nicholas Buelow	Canada	143.56	2025 JGP Italy

Top 10 season's best scores in the rhythm dance
No.	Team	Nation	Score	Event
1	Hana Maria Aboian; Daniil Veselukhin	United States	66.70	2025 JGP United Arab Emirates
2	Iryna Pidgaina; Artem Koval	Ukraine	65.69	2025 JGP Poland
3	Ambre Perrier Gianesini; Samuel Blanc Klaperman	France	65.58	2025 JGP Azerbaijan
4	Dania Mouaden; Theo Bigot	France	64.35	2025 JGP Latvia
5	Layla Veillon; Alexander Brandys	Canada	64.16	2025 JGP Latvia
6	Jasmine Robertson; Chase Rohner	United States	62.08	2025 JGP Italy
7	Zoe Bianchi; Daniel Basile	Italy	60.75	2025 JGP Azerbaijan
8	Arianna Soldati; Nicholas Tagliabue	Italy	60.41	2025 JGP Poland
9	Charlie Anderson; Cayden Dawson	Canada	60.04	2025 JGP Thailand
10	Summer Homick; Nicholas Buelow	Canada	58.78	2025 JGP Azerbaijan

Top 10 season's best scores in the free dance
No.	Team	Nation	Score	Event
1	Hana Maria Aboian; Daniil Veselukhin	United States	100.41	2025 JGP United Arab Emirates
2	Iryna Pidgaina; Artem Koval	Ukraine	98.44	2025 JGP Poland
3	Layla Veillon; Alexander Brandys	Canada	97.84	2025 JGP Poland
4	Ambre Perrier Gianesini; Samuel Blanc Klaperman	France	96.63	2025 JGP Azerbaijan
5	Dania Mouaden; Theo Bigot	France	95.78	2025 JGP Latvia
6	Jasmine Robertson; Chase Rohner	United States	94.44	2025 JGP Italy
7	Charlie Anderson; Cayden Dawson	Canada	91.14	2025 JGP Turkey
8	Zoe Bianchi; Daniel Basile	Italy	89.78	2025 JGP United Arab Emirates
9	Sofiia Beznosikova; Max Leleu	Belgium	86.95	2025 JGP Azerbaijan
10	Summer Homick; Nicholas Buelow	Canada	86.66	2025 JGP Italy
