= 2026 World Junior Figure Skating Championships =

Figure skating competition

- Type: ISU Championship
- Date: 3 – 8 March
- Season: 2025–26
- Location: Tallinn, Estonia
- Host: Estonian Skating Union
- Venue: Tondiraba Ice Hall

Champions
- Men's singles: (Japan) Rio Nakata
- Women's singles: (Japan) Mao Shimada
- Pairs: (Canada) Ava Kemp and Yohnatan Elizarov
- Ice dance: (United States) Hana Maria Aboian and Daniil Veselukhin
- Previous: 2025 World Junior Championships
- Next: 2027 World Junior Championships

The 2026 World Junior Figure Skating Championships was held from 3 to 8 March at the Tondiraba Ice Hall in Tallinn, Estonia. The competition determined the entry quotas for each skating federation at the 2027 World Junior Championships. Medals were awarded in men's singles, women's singles, pair skating, and ice dance.

== Qualification ==
Skaters were eligible for the 2026 World Junior Championships if they turned 13 years of age before 1 July 2025, and if they have not yet turned 19 (singles) or 21 (ice dancers and female pairs skaters) or 23 (male pairs skaters).

Based on the results of the 2025 World Junior Championships, each ISU member nation could field between one and three entries per discipline.

Number of entries per discipline
Spots	Men	Women	Pairs	Ice dance
3	Japan; South Korea	Japan	Canada; Georgia; Ukraine	United States
2	Estonia; Germany; New Zealand; Slovakia; United States	Australia; Estonia; France; Georgia; South Korea; Switzerland; United States	China; France; Italy; Switzerland; United States	Canada; France; Germany; Italy; Ukraine

== Changes to preliminary assignments ==
Member nations started announcing their entries in December 2025. The International Skating Union released the official list of entrants on 9 February 2026.

Date	Discipline	Withdrew	Added	Notes	Ref.
19 February	Women	(Italy) Anna Pezzetta	(Italy) Amanda Ghezzo		
19 February	Ice dance	(United States); Jane Calhoun; Mark Zheltyshev	(United States); Michelle Deych; Ryan Hu	Visa/Passport issues (Zheltyshev)	
25 February	Men	(Canada); Grayson Long	(Canada); David Bondar	Injury	
25 February	Women	(France); Eve Dubecq	(France); Milana Mozeiko	Injury	
27 February	Women	(Azerbaijan); Arina Kalugina			
1 March	Women	(United Arab Emirates); Marie Bierwert			
1 March	Men	(Czech Republic); Jakub Tykal	(Czech Republic); Tadeáš Václavík		

== Medal summary ==
=== Medalists ===
Medals awarded to the skaters who achieved the highest overall placements in each discipline:

Discipline	Gold	Silver	Bronze
Men	(Japan); Rio Nakata	(South Korea); Seo Min-kyu	(Japan); Taiga Nishino
Women	(Japan); Mao Shimada	(Australia); Hana Bath	(Japan); Mayuko Oka
Pairs	(Canada); Ava Kemp; Yohnatan Elizarov	(Canada); Jazmine Desroches; Kieran Thrasher	(Ukraine); Hannah Herrera; Ivan Khobta
Ice dance	(United States); Hana Maria Aboian; Daniil Veselukhin	(France); Ambre Perrier Gianesini; Samuel Blanc-Klaperman	(Ukraine); Iryna Pidgaina; Artem Koval

Small medals awarded to the skaters who achieved the highest short program or rhythm dance placements in each discipline:

Discipline	Gold	Silver	Bronze
Men	(Japan); Rio Nakata	(South Korea); Seo Min-kyu	(Japan); Daiya Ebihara
Women	(Japan); Mao Shimada	(Japan); Mayuko Oka	(Australia); Hana Bath
Pairs	(Canada); Jazmine Desroches; Kieran Thrasher	(Canada); Ava Kemp; Yohnatan Elizarov	(China); Guo Rui; Zhang Yiwen
Ice dance	(United States); Hana Maria Aboian; Daniil Veselukhin	(France); Ambre Perrier Gianesini; Samuel Blanc-Klaperman	(Ukraine); Iryna Pidgaina; Artem Koval

Small medals awarded to the skaters who achieved the highest free skating or free dance placements in each discipline:

Discipline	Gold	Silver	Bronze
Men	(Japan); Rio Nakata	(Japan); Taiga Nishino	(South Korea); Seo Min-kyu
Women	(Australia); Hana Bath	(Japan); Mao Shimada	(Israel); Sophia Shifrin
Pairs	(Canada); Ava Kemp; Yohnatan Elizarov	(Ukraine); Hannah Herrera; Ivan Khobta	(China); Chen Yuxuan; Dong Yinbo
Ice dance	(United States); Hana Maria Aboian; Daniil Veselukhin	(Ukraine); Iryna Pidgaina; Artem Koval	(France); Ambre Perrier Gianesini; Samuel Blanc-Klaperman

=== Medals by country ===
Table of medals for overall placement:

Rank	Nation	Gold	Silver	Bronze	Total
1	Japan	2	0	2	4
2	Canada	1	1	0	2
3	United States	1	0	0	1
4	Australia	0	1	0	1
4	France	0	1	0	1
4	South Korea	0	1	0	1
7	Ukraine	0	0	2	2
Totals (7 entries)		4	4	4	12

== Records and achievements ==
The following new record high scores were set during this competition.

Record high scores
Date	Skater(s)	Event	Segment	Score	Ref.
4 March	(Japan); Rio Nakata	Men	Short program	89.51	

== Results ==
=== Men's singles ===
Men's results
Rank	Skater	Nation	Total	SP		FS	
1st place, gold medalist(s)	Rio Nakata	Japan	268.47	1	89.51	1	176.96
2nd place, silver medalist(s)	Seo Min-kyu	South Korea	243.91	2	86.33	3	157.58
3rd place, bronze medalist(s)	Taiga Nishino	Japan	241.23	4	81.14	2	160.09
4	Jacob Sanchez	United States	229.10	5	81.03	5	148.07
5	Choi Ha-bin	South Korea	224.36	9	75.78	4	148.58
6	Lucius Kazanecki	United States	219.36	11	74.89	7	144.47
7	Lee Jae-keun	South Korea	218.20	6	79.27	10	138.93
8	Yanhao Li	New Zealand	217.58	7	77.18	9	140.40
9	Daiya Ebihara	Japan	217.52	3	81.53	12	135.99
10	Denis Krouglov	Belgium	216.70	10	75.22	8	141.48
11	Genrikh Gartung	Germany	209.68	17	63.67	6	146.01
12	Yehor Kurtsev	Ukraine	208.45	13	70.05	11	138.40
13	Li Yu-Hsiang	Chinese Taipei	202.54	12	71.06	16	131.48
14	David Bondar	Canada	202.06	14	69.09	13	132.97
15	Ean Weiler	Switzerland	198.91	8	76.77	19	122.14
16	Nikita Sheiko	Israel	198.88	15	67.12	15	131.76
17	Hiro Kaewtathip	Thailand	194.38	20	61.93	14	132.45
18	Matias Lindfors	Finland	192.90	16	66.70	17	125.20
19	Li Jiarui	Hong Kong	187.81	19	62.38	18	125.43
20	Zhao Qihan	China	181.83	22	61.55	20	120.28
21	Leon Rojkov	Germany	169.14	24	60.68	21	108.46
22	Konstantin Supatashvili	Georgia	165.39	21	61.62	22	103.77
23	Matvii Yefymenko	Poland	159.98	18	62.89	24	97.09
24	Albin Samuelsson	Sweden	158.70	23	60.93	23	97.77
25	Matteo Marchioni	Italy	60.16	25	60.16	Did not advance to free skate	
26	Luka Imedashvili	Lithuania	59.77	26	59.77	Did not advance to free skate	
27	Jānis Znotiņš	Latvia	57.68	27	57.68	Did not advance to free skate	
28	Lukáš Václavík	Slovakia	57.35	28	57.35	Did not advance to free skate	
29	Maksym Petrychenko	Austria	55.66	29	55.66	Did not advance to free skate	
30	Arin Yorke	Great Britain	54.51	30	54.51	Did not advance to free skate	
31	Vladislav Churakov	Estonia	54.47	31	54.47	Did not advance to free skate	
32	Mikayel Salazaryan	Armenia	54.05	32	54.05	Did not advance to free skate	
33	Daniil Valanov	Norway	53.95	33	53.95	Did not advance to free skate	
34	Dmitry Rudenko	Slovakia	52.96	34	52.96	Did not advance to free skate	
35	Tadeáš Václavík	Czech Republic	52.73	35	52.73	Did not advance to free skate	
36	André Zapata	Spain	52.55	36	52.55	Did not advance to free skate	
37	Artur Smagulov	Kazakhstan	51.76	37	51.76	Did not advance to free skate	
38	Deyan Mihaylov	Bulgaria	51.72	38	51.72	Did not advance to free skate	
39	Furkan Emre İncel	Turkey	50.66	39	50.66	Did not advance to free skate	
40	Ilya Nesterov	Estonia	47.90	40	47.90	Did not advance to free skate	
41	Jean Médard	France	46.10	41	46.10	Did not advance to free skate	
42	Aleksei Vlasenko	Hungary	45.93	42	45.93	Did not advance to free skate	
43	Julio Potapenko	Australia	40.37	43	40.37	Did not advance to free skate	

=== Women's singles ===
Women's results
Rank	Skater	Nation	Total	SP		FS	
1st place, gold medalist(s)	Mao Shimada	Japan	208.91	1	71.90	2	137.01
2nd place, silver medalist(s)	Hana Bath	Australia	205.39	3	66.95	1	138.44
3rd place, bronze medalist(s)	Mayuko Oka	Japan	197.17	2	69.77	4	127.40
4	Sophia Shifrin	Israel	193.80	4	65.38	3	128.42
5	Wang Yihan	China	185.37	6	63.44	6	121.93
6	Inga Gurgenidze	Georgia	182.60	5	64.28	10	118.32
7	Huh Ji-yu	South Korea	180.55	10	62.16	9	118.39
8	Valeriya Ezhova	Switzerland	179.17	7	62.65	12	116.52
9	Angela Shao	United States	178.93	9	62.24	11	116.69
10	Mei Okada	Japan	177.77	24	53.70	5	124.07
11	Leandra Tzimpoukakis	Switzerland	176.54	17	56.37	8	120.17
12	Sophie Joline von Felten	United States	176.10	8	62.62	14	113.48
13	Kim Yu-seong	South Korea	175.90	13	59.44	13	116.46
14	Elina Goidina	Estonia	175.76	20	54.44	7	121.32
15	Alica Lengyelová	Slovakia	168.30	12	61.14	17	107.16
16	Stefania Gladki	France	168.01	14	58.65	16	109.36
17	Maria Eliise Kaljuvere	Estonia	165.39	19	54.45	15	110.94
18	Anna Gerke	Germany	158.14	15	57.77	19	100.37
19	Jana Horčičková	Czech Republic	156.38	22	54.12	18	102.26
20	Amanda Ghezzo	Italy	155.14	16	57.00	20	98.14
21	Angel Delevaque	Netherlands	151.11	23	54.03	21	97.08
22	Venla Sinisalo	Finland	150.47	18	54.70	22	95.77
23	Ariel Guo	Hong Kong	146.23	21	54.27	23	91.96
24	Polina Dzsumanyijazova	Hungary	144.48	11	61.37	24	83.11
25	Hannah Frank	Austria	53.54	25	53.54	Did not advance to free skate	
26	Milana Siniavskytė	Lithuania	52.33	26	52.33	Did not advance to free skate	
27	Alice Smith	Great Britain	52.20	27	52.20	Did not advance to free skate	
28	Megan Woodley	Canada	52.17	28	52.17	Did not advance to free skate	
29	Leyla Çetin	Turkey	51.72	29	51.72	Did not advance to free skate	
30	Ariadna Gupta Espada	Spain	51.66	30	51.66	Did not advance to free skate	
31	Kira Baranovska	Latvia	51.13	31	51.13	Did not advance to free skate	
32	Lilou Remeysen	Belgium	51.03	32	51.03	Did not advance to free skate	
33	Tsai Yu-Feng	Chinese Taipei	49.73	33	49.73	Did not advance to free skate	
34	Zhasmin Shlaga	Kyrgyzstan	48.56	34	48.56	Did not advance to free skate	
35	Sofiia Rymshyna	Ukraine	48.47	35	48.47	Did not advance to free skate	
36	Pernille With	Norway	48.43	36	48.43	Did not advance to free skate	
37	Vasilisa Bogomolova	Cyprus	47.90	37	47.90	Did not advance to free skate	
38	Renee Tsai	New Zealand	46.47	38	46.47	Did not advance to free skate	
39	Ula Zadnikar	Slovenia	45.06	39	45.06	Did not advance to free skate	
40	Krista Georgieva	Bulgaria	43.72	40	43.72	Did not advance to free skate	
41	Nora Coppens	Sweden	43.07	41	43.07	Did not advance to free skate	
42	Ketevan Makharadze	Georgia	42.30	42	42.30	Did not advance to free skate	
43	Izabella Esaian	Armenia	41.59	43	41.59	Did not advance to free skate	
44	Karina Sheina	Kazakhstan	40.06	44	40.06	Did not advance to free skate	
45	Milana Mozeiko	France	39.82	45	39.82	Did not advance to free skate	
46	Weronika Ferlin	Poland	38.47	46	38.47	Did not advance to free skate	
47	Phattaratida Kaneshige	Thailand	38.29	47	38.29	Did not advance to free skate	
48	Paula Kasnar	Croatia	37.54	48	37.54	Did not advance to free skate	
49	Camille Vinther Poulsen	Denmark	36.22	49	36.22	Did not advance to free skate	
50	Sienna Kaczmarczyk	Australia	35.94	50	35.94	Did not advance to free skate	
WD	Ekaterina Balaganskaia	Serbia	Withdrew from competition				

=== Pairs ===
Pairs' results
Rank	Skater	Nation	Total	SP		FS	
1st place, gold medalist(s)	Ava Kemp; Yohnatan Elizarov	Canada	167.90	2	62.22	1	105.68
2nd place, silver medalist(s)	Jazmine Desroches; Kieran Thrasher	Canada	162.25	1	62.84	4	99.41
3rd place, bronze medalist(s)	Hannah Herrera; Ivan Khobta	Ukraine	160.15	5	56.95	2	103.20
4	Chen Yuxuan; Dong Yinbo	China	157.99	6	56.74	3	101.25
5	Olivia Flores; Luke Wang	United States	149.99	4	57.96	5	92.03
6	Guo Rui; Zhang Yiwen	China	146.83	3	58.34	9	88.49
7	Reagan Moss; Jakub Galbavy	United States	144.50	7	53.25	6	91.25
8	Louise Ehrhard; Matthis Pellegris	France	140.68	10	49.95	7	90.73
9	Julia Quattrocchi; Étienne Lacasse	Canada	139.91	9	51.27	8	88.64
10	Polina Polman; Gabriel Renoldi	Italy	136.72	11	49.56	10	87.16
11	Anita Mapelli; Noah Quesada Grau	Spain	135.76	8	51.48	11	84.28
12	Laura Hečková; Alex Války	Slovakia	129.63	14	47.14	12	82.49
13	Irina Napolitano; Edoardo Comi	Italy	123.73	12	49.54	14	74.19
14	Romane Télémaque; Lucas Coulon	France	121.64	15	46.07	13	75.57
15	Neamh Davison; Daniel Borisov	Great Britain	118.80	13	47.44	16	71.36
16	Laura Gauch; Linus Mager	Switzerland	118.58	16	44.42	15	74.16
17	Lily Wilberforce; Mózes József Berei	Hungary	43.61	17	43.61	Did not advance to the free skate	
18	Johanka Žilková; Matyáš Rafael Becerra	Czech Republic	43.54	18	43.54	Did not advance to the free skate	

=== Ice dance ===
Ice dance results
Rank	Skater	Nation	Total	RD		FD	
1st place, gold medalist(s)	Hana Maria Aboian; Daniil Veselukhin	United States	166.71	1	66.45	1	100.26
2nd place, silver medalist(s)	Ambre Perrier Gianesini; Samuel Blanc-Klaperman	France	164.88	2	66.31	3	98.57
3rd place, bronze medalist(s)	Iryna Pidgaina; Artem Koval	Ukraine	164.32	3	65.45	2	98.87
4	Layla Veillon; Alexander Brandys	Canada	160.58	4	63.81	4	96.77
5	Dania Mouaden; Théo Bigot	France	153.00	6	60.60	5	92.40
6	Arianna Soldati; Nicholas Tagliabue	Italy	148.81	5	61.55	7	87.26
7	Zoe Bianchi; Daniel Basile	Italy	147.51	8	57.94	6	89.57
8	Alexia Kruk; Jan Eisenhaber	Germany	139.85	9	56.50	10	83.35
9	Diane Sznajder; Jáchym Novák	Czech Republic	138.70	11	52.67	8	86.03
10	Anita Straub; Andreas Straub	Austria	138.22	10	54.67	9	83.55
11	Jasmine Robertson; Chase Rohner	United States	135.38	7	59.16	15	76.22
12	Tetiana Bielodonova; Ivan Kachur	Ukraine	133.94	12	51.55	11	82.39
13	Seraina Tscharner; Laurin Wiederkehr	Switzerland	129.98	17	49.21	12	80.77
14	Kaho Yamashita; Yuto Nagata	Japan	127.56	15	50.13	13	77.43
15	Summer Homick; Nicholas Buelow	Canada	126.22	16	49.38	14	76.84
16	Michelle Deych; Ryan Hu	United States	125.87	13	50.78	16	75.09
17	Mimi Marler Davies; Joseph Black	Great Britain	123.46	14	50.66	18	72.80
18	Yin Shanjie; Yang Shirui	China	123.36	18	48.79	17	74.57
19	Xing Yuxuan; Chau Han Wan	Hong Kong	119.25	20	47.09	19	72.16
20	Lara Sundberg; Héctor González Elvira	Spain	115.65	19	47.54	20	68.11
21	Eniko Kobor; Zoard Kobor	Germany	46.03	21	46.03	Did not advance to the free dance	
22	Ksenia Šipunova; Miron Korjagin	Estonia	45.88	22	45.88	Did not advance to the free dance	
23	Eva Rozhnova; Platon Zubkov	Finland	45.41	23	45.41	Did not advance to the free dance	
24	Laura Balcerska; David Diadchenko	Poland	43.48	24	43.48	Did not advance to the free dance	
25	Charlotte Chung; Axel Mackenzie	Sweden	41.38	25	41.38	Did not advance to the free dance	
26	Villo Mira Szilagyi; István Jaracs	Hungary	39.32	26	39.32	Did not advance to the free dance	
27	Julia Epps; Blake Gilman	Israel	39.09	27	39.09	Did not advance to the free dance	
28	Anna O'Brien; Drake Tong	Azerbaijan	38.79	28	38.79	Did not advance to the free dance	
29	Lucia Štefanovová; Jacopo Boeris	Slovakia	38.47	29	38.47	Did not advance to the free dance	
30	Silvia Lutay; Konstantin Tkachenko	Bulgaria	30.10	30	30.10	Did not advance to the free dance	
