= Satsuki Muramoto =

Japanese figure skater

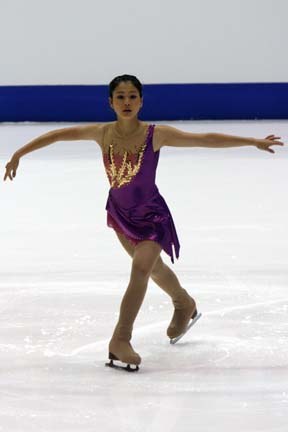

Personal information
- Native name: 村元 小月
- Born: May 15, 1990 (age 36) Akashi, Hyōgo, Japan
- Home town: Kobe
- Height: 1.57 m (5 ft 2 in)

Figure skating career
- Country: Japan
- Coach: Mie Hamada; Yamato Tamura
- Skating club: Kobe Port FSC

Satsuki Muramoto (村元 小月, Muramoto Satsuki; born May 15, 1990) is a Japanese former competitive figure skater. She is the 2010 Triglav Trophy champion and 2009 Merano Cup silver medalist.

== Personal life ==
Muramoto is the older sister of ice dancer Kana Muramoto.

== Coaching career ==
Following her retirement from competitive figure skating, Muramoto became a coach. She currently coaches at the Kinoshita Academy in Uji, Kyoto alongside her former coach, Mie Hamada.

Her current and former students include:

- Mone Chiba
- Sumika Kanazawa
- Ayumi Katogani / Lucas Tsuyoshi Honda
- Yuto Kishina
- Riria Kono
- Ikura Kushida
- Ryoga Morimoto
- Haruna Murakami
- Yuna Nagaoka / Sumitada Moriguchi
- Mayuko Oka
- Promsan Rattanadilok Na Phuket
- Ayumi Shibayama
- Mao Shimada
- Sena Takahashi
- Hana Yoshida

== Programs ==
Season	Short program	Free skating
2008–09	Tango Amore	House of Flying Daggers by Shigeru Umebayashi
2006–07	Quidam (from Cirque du Soleil) by Benoît Jutras	The Umbrellas of Cherbourg by Michel Legrand

== Competitive highlights ==
JGP: Junior Grand Prix

International
Event	00–01	01–02	02–03	03–04	04–05	05–06	06–07	07–08	08–09	09–10	10–11	11–12	12–13
Merano Cup										2nd			
NRW Trophy													5th
Triglav Trophy										1st			
International: Junior
Junior Worlds							11th						
JGP Bulgaria								2nd					
JGP Canada						10th							
JGP China					7th								
JGP Czech Rep.							11th						
JGP Italy									8th				
JGP Norway							4th						
JGP Poland				11th									
JGP Slovakia				4th									
JGP USA								7th					
Mladost Trophy				2nd J									
National
Japan							9th		8th	13th		12th	9th
Japan Junior			17th	6th	11th	11th	3rd	4th					
Japan Novice	14th B	7th A	4th A										
J: Junior level
