= Mie Hamada =

Japanese figure skater and coach

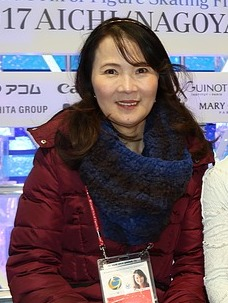

Personal information
- Native name: 濱田 美栄
- Born: October 29, 1959 (age 67) Kyoto, Japan

Mie Hamada (濱田 美栄, Hamada Mie; born October 29, 1959) is a Japanese figure skating coach and former competitor.

== Personal life ==
Hamada was born October 29, 1959 in Kyoto, Japan. She graduated from Doshisha University in 1983.

== Coaching career ==
For many years, Hamada coached at the Kansai University Skating Club in Takatsuki, Osaka with Yamato Tamura before relocating to the Kinoshita Academy Kyoto Ice Arena in Uji in 2020. Hamada is also a member of the Japan Figure Skating Instructor Association.

At the 2024 ISU Skating Awards, she won the "Best Coach" award.

Her current students include:

- Mone Chiba
- Sumika Kanazawa
- Ayumi Kagotani / Lucas Tsuyoshi Honda
- Riria Kono
- Ikura Kushida
- Yuna Nagaoka / Sumitada Moriguchi
- Mayuko Oka
- Mao Shimada
- Sena Takahashi
- Hanaha Takeshima
- Kei Yamada

Her former students include:

- Tomoki Hiwatashi
- Lucas Tsuyoshi Honda
- Marin Honda
- Sara Honda
- Taichi Honda
- Ayaka Hosoda
- Riona Kato
- Mana Kawabe
- Mariko Kihara
- Rika Kihira
- Kim Chae-hwa
- Yuto Kishina
- Akiko Kitamura
- Satoko Miyahara
- Ryoga Morimoto
- Haruna Murakami
- Haruna Murakami / Sumitada Moriguchi
- Kana Muramoto
- Satsuki Muramoto
- Shunsuke Nakamura
- Yukina Ōta
- Haruya Sasaki
- Aki Sawada
- Ayumi Shibayama
- Sae Shimizu / Lucas Tsuyoshi Honda
- Yuna Shiraiwa
- Azusa Tanaka
- Hana Yoshida
- Young You
- Vincent Zhou

== Lawsuit with Nobunari Oda ==
In April 2017, Nobunari Oda accepted a job as head coach at the Kansai University Skating Club, where Hamada had been coaching at the time. However, Oda would step down from this position in September 2019 and in November 2019, he would hold a press conference claiming that his reason for resignation was due to Hamada morally harassing him. Shortly after that conference, Oda would file a lawsuit against Hamada, seeking 11 million yen in damages for mental distress.

Oda further alleged that Hamada would yell at her students, slam walls and water bottles to intimidate them, and that there was even an incident where Hamada grabbed one of her female students by the ponytail and slammed her down onto the ice. He would also explain that after expressing concerns to Hamada about her training methods, Hamada became enraged and subsequently began ignoring him, talking behind his back, and spreading rumors about him. According to Oda, this type of treatment at the rink deteriorated his mental health, leading him to quit his job at the Kansai University Skating Club. "There was a power balance between me and Coach Hamada," Oda would explain. "And even though I was the manager, I had no decision-making power."

Hamada would vehemently deny Oda's claims and countersue Oda in response for defamation for what Oda publicly said about her during his press conference and on his blog. A parent of one of the students training at the Kansai University Skating Club would claim that Oda called students with poor grades "worthless athletes" and angrily told children who came to train in Osaka from overseas to "go back to their country." This individual further claimed that Oda reduced another parent to tears, saying that they were "unfit to be a parent" because of their child failing to say "hello."

In March 2023, Judge Akitoshi Matsumoto of the Osaka District Court would dismiss Oda's lawsuit and find Oda guilty for defaming Hamada. As a result, Oda was ordered to pay her 2.2 million yen.
