= Patrick Blackwell =

American figure skater (born 2008)

Personal information
- Born: March 30, 2008 (age 18) Providence, Rhode Island, U.S.
- Home town: Norwood, Massachusetts, U.S.

Figure skating career
- Country: United States
- Coach: Annette Blackwell; Olga Ganicheva; Alexei Letov
- Skating club: Skating Club of Boston
- Began skating: 2011

Patrick Blackwell (born March 30, 2008) is an American figure skater. He is the 2026 CS Budapest Trophy silver medalist and the 2026 U.S. junior national champion. On the junior level, he is a two-time Junior Grand Prix silver medalist and the 2025 Tallinn Trophy junior champion.

== Personal life ==
Blackwell was born on March 30, 2008, in Providence, Rhode Island, to Chris and Annette Blackwell. His mother is a figure skating coach, and he began skating at the age of two after accompanying her to the rink. He has an older sister.

Blackwell speaks German fluently.

== Career ==
=== 2024–25 season: Junior Grand Prix debut ===
Blackwell made his Junior Grand Prix debut in September 2024 at JGP Czech Republic, where he won the silver medal after placing fifth in the short program and first in the free skate. He then finished sixth at JGP China in October.

In January 2025, Blackwell won the bronze medal in his junior debut at the U.S. Championships. He was subsequently assigned to the 2025 World Junior Figure Skating Championships in Debrecen, Hungary, where he finished 13th.

=== 2025–26 season: U.S. junior champion ===
Blackwell opened the season with a silver medal at JGP Thailand. Later that month, he finished fourth at JGP Azerbaijan. In November, he won the junior men's event at the Tallinn Trophy, his first international title.

In January 2026, Blackwell won the junior title at the U.S. Championships. He dedicated the win to his friend Spencer Lane, a figure skater who was killed in the crash of American Airlines Flight 5342 in January 2025, days after the 2025 U.S. Championships.

=== 2026–27 season: Senior debut ===
Blackwell began the season on the Junior Grand Prix series, finishing fifth at both JGP China and JGP Georgia.

In October, he made his senior debut at the 2026 CS Budapest Trophy, winning the silver medal with a personal best total of 242.93 points. In an interview with Eurosport after the event, he reflected on his performance with candor and was pleasantly surprised with his performance.

== Programs ==
Season	Short program	Free skating
2026–27	Sombra de Fuego by Émilio Dallaire; Puertas de la libertad by Karl Hugo; choreo. by Adam Blake	The Day We Choose to Die by Trailer Rebel; Autumn Moon by Eternal Eclipse; Polaris by Judah Earl and Boda; Warriors by League of Legends Music, 2WEI and Edda Hayes; choreo. by Adam Blake
2025–26	Uprising by Muse	Silent Guardian by Fringe Element; Warriors by League of Legends Music, 2WEI and Edda Hayes
2024–25	Love Is a Bitch by Two Feet	Smoke and Mirrors by Gabriel Saba

== Competitive highlights ==
- CS – Event of the ISU Challenger Series
- JGP – Event of the ISU Junior Grand Prix

Competition placements at senior level
Season	2026–27
CS Budapest Trophy	2nd

Competition placements at junior level
Season	2024–25	2025–26	2026–27
World Junior Championships	13th		
U.S. Championships	3rd	1st	
JGP Azerbaijan		4th	
JGP China	6th		5th
JGP Czech Republic	2nd		
JGP Georgia			5th
JGP Thailand		2nd	
Cranberry Cup International	10th		
Tallinn Trophy		1st	

== Detailed results ==
ISU personal best scores in the +5/-5 GOE System
Segment	Type	Score	Event
Total	TSS	242.93	2026 CS Budapest Trophy
Short program	TSS	78.44	2026 CS Budapest Trophy
Short program	TES	43.20	2026 CS Budapest Trophy
Short program	PCS	35.24	2026 CS Budapest Trophy
Free skating	TSS	164.49	2026 CS Budapest Trophy
Free skating	TES	87.57	2026 CS Budapest Trophy
Free skating	PCS	76.92	2026 CS Budapest Trophy

=== Senior level ===
Results in the 2026–27 season
Date	Event	SP		FS		Total	
Date	Event	P	Score	P	Score	P	Score
Oct 16–18, 2026	(Hungary) 2026 CS Budapest Trophy	5	78.44	2	164.49	2	242.93

=== Junior level ===
Results in the 2026–27 season
Date	Event	SP		FS		Total	
Date	Event	P	Score	P	Score	P	Score
Aug 20–22, 2026	2026 JGP China	12	64.01	4	138.79	5	202.80
Sep 24–26, 2026	(Georgia (country)) 2026 JGP Georgia	4	74.96	6	128.63	5	203.59

Results in the 2025–26 season
Date	Event	SP		FS		Total	
Date	Event	P	Score	P	Score	P	Score
Sep 9–13, 2025	2025 JGP Thailand	3	74.23	2	147.94	2	222.17
Sep 23–26, 2025	2025 JGP Azerbaijan	2	75.86	6	117.29	4	193.15
Nov 25–30, 2025	(Estonia) 2025 Tallinn Trophy	1	76.29	1	131.27	1	207.56
Jan 4–11, 2026	(United States) 2026 U.S. Championships (Junior)	1	74.80	1	161.50	1	236.30

Results in the 2024–25 season
Date	Event	SP		FS		Total	
Date	Event	P	Score	P	Score	P	Score
Aug 8–11, 2024	(United States) 2024 Cranberry Cup International	18	54.62	8	120.62	10	175.24
Sep 4–7, 2024	2024 JGP Czech Republic	5	69.42	1	152.14	2	221.56
Oct 9–12, 2024	2024 JGP China	6	64.24	4	132.23	6	196.47
Jan 20–26, 2025	(United States) 2025 U.S. Championships (Junior)	1	77.73	4	118.04	3	195.77
Feb 25 – Mar 2, 2025	(Hungary) 2025 World Junior Championships	21	62.00	12	138.06	13	200.06
