= Arina Kalugina =

Russian-Azerbaijani figure skater

Personal information
- Native name: Арина Калугина
- Born: 24 November 2010 (age 15) Yaroslavl, Russia
- Home town: Moscow, Russia
- Height: 158 cm (5 ft 2 in)

Figure skating career
- Country: Azerbaijan
- Coach: Viktoria Butsaeva; Evgeni Vlasov; Galina Ishchenko
- Skating club: Sports School Moskvich
- Began skating: 2014

Arina Kalugina (Russian: Арина Калугина; born 24 November 2010) is a Russian-Azerbaijani figure skater who represents Azerbaijan. On the junior level, she is the 2025 Denis Ten Memorial bronze medalist and the 2025 Ephesus Cup bronze medalist.

She has landed the quadruple Salchow jump in competition, being the first woman representing Azerbaijan to do so.

== Personal life ==
Arina was born on 24 November 2010 in Yaroslavl, Russia.

== Career ==
=== Early career ===
Kalugina began skating in 2014 at the age of four. She has previously skated for Russia, making appearances at events such as the 2024 Russian Jumping Championship and the Moscow Championships. She began representing Azerbaijan on the international stage in the 2024–25 season.

=== 2024–2025 season ===
Kalugina made her first international appearance for Azerbaijan in January 2025 at the 2025 Ephesus Cup where she won the bronze medal behind Inga Gurgenidze and Elina Goidina. The following month she competed at the 2025 Junior World Championships finishing in 14th place with a total score of 172.43 points. She successfully executed a quadruple Salchow - double Axel sequence in her free skate. "I'm happy that I landed my first quad salchow, and even though I fell on the second one, I feel like I gave my maximum...For next season, I want to do new programs, and I also want to work on new quads. I want to do a quad flip and a quad loop, and I want to get consistency on my triple Axel." shares Arina.

=== 2025–2026 season ===
Arina opened her season competing at the 2025 Junior Grand Prix in Turkey finishing in ninth place overall. She followed this up by finishing seventh at the JGP in Azerbaijan.

In October, she won the bronze medal at the 2025 Denis Ten Memorial Challenge. Subsequently, she finished fifth at the 2025 Bosphorus Cup.

In early March, Kalugina withdrew from the 2026 World Junior Championships due to visa conflicts.

=== 2026–2027 season ===
Kalugina began her season at the 2026 Junior Grand Prix in Turkey placing seventeenth overall. She followed this up by finishing fourteenth at the stage in Georgia.

== Programs ==
Season	Short program	Free skating	Exhibition
2026–27	(They Long To Be) Close To You; by Lady Gaga, Joaquin Phoenix, Hal David, Burt Bacharach: Sweet Dreams; by Klaas, Annie Lennox, Dave Stewart	Main Theme (from "Chocolat"); by Rachel Portman: Let's Play (from "The Queen's Gambit" soundtrack); Main Title (from "The Queen's Gambit" soundtrack); by Carlos Rafael Rivera, Jeremy Levy	
2025–26	Young and Beautiful; by Lana Del Rey, Rick Nowels: Crazy in Love; by Emeli Sande, Beyonce Knowles	Main Theme (from "Chocolat"); by Rachel Portman: Let's Play (from "The Queen's Gambit" soundtrack); Main Title (from "The Queen's Gambit" soundtrack); by Carlos Rafael Rivera, Jeremy Levy	
2024–25	Young and Beautiful; by Lana Del Rey, Rick Nowels: Crazy in Love; by Emeli Sande, Beyonce Knowles	Snowstorm : II. Waltz; by Georgy Sviridov	

== Competitive highlights ==
- GP – Event of the ISU Grand Prix Series
- JGP – Event of the ISU Junior Grand Prix Series
- CS – Event of the ISU Challenger Series
- TBD – Assigned
- WD – Withdrew from competition

ISU personal best scores in the +5/-5 GOE System
Segment	Type	Score	Event
Total	TSS	172.43	2025 World Junior Championships
Short program	TSS	57.87	2025 JGP Azerbaijan
Short program	TES	34.47	2025 World Junior Championships
Short program	PCS	25.09	2025 JGP Azerbaijan
Free skating	TSS	115.39	2025 World Junior Championships
Free skating	TES	71.22	2025 World Junior Championships
Free skating	PCS	52.07	2025 JGP Azerbaijan

Competition placements at junior level
Season	2024–25	2025–26	2026–27
World Junior Championships	14th		
Bosphorus Cup		5th	
Ephesus Cup	3rd		
Denis Ten Challenge		3rd	
JGP Turkey		9th	17th
JGP Azerbaijan		7th	
JGP Georgia			14th

== Detailed results ==
Results in the 2026–27 season
Date	Event	SP		FS		Total	
Date	Event	P	Score	P	Score	P	Score
Sep 17–19, 2026	2026 JGP Turkey	23	45.42	13	98.83	17	144.25
Sep 24–26, 2026	(Georgia (country)) 2026 JGP Georgia	11	56.16	14	103.86	14	160.02

Results in the 2025–26 season
Date	Event	SP		FS		Total	
Date	Event	P	Score	P	Score	P	Score
27 – 30 August 2025	2025 Junior Grand Prix in Turkey	11	54.18	10	103.47	9	157.65
24 – 27 September 2025	2025 Junior Grand Prix in Azerbaijan	6	57.87	7	109.91	7	167.78
1 – 4 October 2025	(Kazakhstan) 2025 Denis Ten Memorial Challenge	3	51.71	2	115.53	3	167.24
24 – 30 November 2025	(Turkey) 2025 Bosphorus Cup	4	60.04	6	94.81	5	154.85

Results in the 2024–25 season
Date	Event	SP		FS		Total	
Date	Event	P	Score	P	Score	P	Score
20–24 January 2025	(Turkey) 2025 Ephesus Cup	3	58.98	3	114.66	3	173.64
24 Feb – 2 March 2025	(Hungary) 2025 World Junior Championships	16	57.04	12	115.39	14	172.43
