= Sumika Kanazawa =

Japanese figure skater (born 2012)

Personal information
- Native name: 金沢 純禾
- Born: February 28, 2012 (age 14) Sapporo, Hokkaido, Japan
- Home town: Uji, Kyoto, Japan
- Height: 1.55 m (5 ft 1 in)

Figure skating career
- Country: Japan
- Discipline: Women's singles
- Coach: Mie Hamada; Satsuki Muramoto; Hiroaki Sato; Haruko Okamoto; Cathy Reed
- Skating club: Kinoshita Academy
- Began skating: 2015

Sumika Kanazawa (金沢 純禾, Kanazawa Sumika; born February 28, 2012) is a Japanese figure skater. She is a two-time Junior Grand Prix gold medalist (2025, 2026), the 2026 JGP Thailand silver medalist, and a two-time Japan Novice A champion (2023, 2024).

== Personal life ==
Sumika Kanazawa was born on February 28, 2012, in Sapporo, Hokkaido, Japan. At around seven years old, she and her mother moved to Uji, Kyoto so Kanazawa could further pursue her skating career while her father remained in Hokkaido for his work.

She currently attends Seisa Momiji Junior High School. In addition to figure skating, Kanazawa also enjoys dance, singing, and cooking.

Her figure skating idols are Alexandra Trusova and Alysa Liu.

== Career ==
=== Early career ===
Kanazawa began figure skating in 2015 at the age of three at the encouragement of her father, who was a fan of Mao Asada. She initially trained at the Sapporo Aurora Figure Skating Club under Naomi Takahashi and Uruha Takahashi. Around 2019, Kanazawa relocated to Uji, Kyoto and made the transfer to the Kinoshita Academy so she could train under Mie Hamada.

During her first season on the advanced novice level, Kanazawa won gold at the 2023–24 Japan Novice Championships and finished in twelfth place at the 2023–24 Japan Junior Championships. The following season, she repeated as a gold medalist at the 2024–25 Japan Novice Championships and placed tenth at the 2024–25 Japan Junior Championships.

=== 2025–26 season ===
Kanazawa began her season by making her junior international debut on the Junior Grand Prix series. She won the gold medal at 2025 JGP Italy. "It was my first Junior Grand Prix so I was sure I would be nervous," said Kanazawa following the event. "I came out with the goal of just having fun so I'm really happy to have won." Kanazawa then followed this up with a fourth-place finish at 2025 JGP Poland. With these results, Kanazawa qualified for the 2025–26 Junior Grand Prix Final in Nagoya, Japan.

In late November, she competed at the 2025–26 Japan Junior Championships, where she finished in fourth place. The following week, Kanazawa competed at the 2025–26 Junior Grand Prix Final, where she finished fifth overall. During her free skate at the event, Kanazawa attempted the triple Axel during her free skate for the first time in international competition, landing it, but it was deemed as underrotated.

Kanazawa's placement at the junior national championships granted her an invitation to compete at the senior national championships, where she placed sixteenth overall.

=== 2026–27 season ===
Kanazawa opened the new season at the Junior Grand Prix in Thailand. She placed 1st in the short program and 2nd in the free skate; leading her to finish 2nd overall. At the Junior Grand Prix in Poland, she placed second in the short program, but won the free skate and the event overall. With these results Kanazawa qualified for her second consecutive Junior Grand Prix Final.

== Programs ==
Season	Short program	Free skating
2026–2027	Moonlight by Viktoria Tocca & Jennifer Thomas; Moonlight Sonata by Ludwig van Beethoven choreo. by Kana Muramoto	Hooray for Love; Misty; It Don't Mean a Thing (If It Ain't Got That Swing) by Ella Fitzgerald choreo. by Misha Ge
2025–2026	Call Me Cruella (from Cruella) by Florence and the Machine & Nicholas Britell choreo. by Kana Muramoto	I Do Believe In Fairies; Flying (from Peter Pan) by James Newton Howard; You Can Fly! You Can Fly! You Can Fly! (from Peter Pan) performed by Natural Notes choreo. by Kaitlyn Weaver
2024–2025	Kung Fu Panda by Hans Zimmer choreo. by Cathy Reed	The Sky and the Dawn and the Sun by Celtic Woman choreo. by Kana Muramoto
2023–2024	Kung Fu Panda by Hans Zimmer choreo. by Cathy Reed	E.T. by John Williams choreo. by Cathy Reed

== Competitive highlights ==
- JGP – Event of the ISU Grand Prix Series
- TBD – Assigned

Competition placements at senior level
Season	2025–26
Japan Championships	16th

Competition placements at junior level
Season	2023-24	2024-25	2025–26	2026–27
Japan Championships	12th	10th	4th	
JGP Final			5th	TBD
JGP Italy			1st	
JGP Poland			4th	1st
JGP Thailand				2nd

== Detailed results ==
ISU personal best scores in the +5/-5 GOE System
Segment	Type	Score	Event
Total	TSS	202.79	2026 JGP Thailand
Short program	TSS	70.38	2026 JGP Thailand
Short program	TES	40.96	2026 JGP Thailand
Short program	PCS	29.52	2026 JGP Poland
Free skating	TSS	132.41	2026 JGP Thailand
Free skating	TES	70.81	2026 JGP Thailand
Free skating	PCS	61.60	2026 JGP Thailand

=== Senior level ===
Results in the 2025–26 season
Date	Event	SP		FS		Total	
Date	Event	P	Score	P	Score	P	Score
Dec 18–21, 2025	2025–26 Japan Championships	19	57.09	13	124.58	16	181.67

=== Junior level ===
Results in the 2023–24 season
Date	Event	SP		FS		Total	
Date	Event	P	Score	P	Score	P	Score
Nov 17–19, 2023	2023–24 Japan Championships (Junior)	19	50.21	7	108.56	12	158.77

Results in the 2024–25 season
Date	Event	SP		FS		Total	
Date	Event	P	Score	P	Score	P	Score
Nov 15–17, 2024	2024–25 Japan Championships (Junior)	7	60.31	13	106.69	10	167.00

Results in the 2025–26 season
Date	Event	SP		FS		Total	
Date	Event	P	Score	P	Score	P	Score
Sep 3–6, 2025	2025 JGP Italy	1	65.37	3	120.40	1	185.77
Oct 1–4, 2025	2025 JGP Poland	2	64.26	5	124.15	4	188.41
Nov 22–24, 2025	2025–26 Japan Championships (Junior)	4	64.23	5	121.72	4	185.95
Dec 4–7, 2025	(Japan) 2025–26 Junior Grand Prix Final	4	66.16	4	129.07	5	195.23

Results in the 2026-27 season
Date	Event	SP		FS		Total	
Date	Event	P	Score	P	Score	P	Score
Sep 3–5, 2026	2026 JGP Thailand	1	70.38	2	132.41	2	202.79
Oct 8-10, 2026	2026 JGP Poland	2	69.24	1	127.13	1	196.37
