= Lucius Kazanecki =

American figure skater (born 2008)

- Kazanecki at the 2026 U.S. Championships

Personal information
- Born: April 21, 2008 (age 18) Morristown, New Jersey, U.S.
- Home town: Bethesda, Maryland, U.S.
- Height: 6 ft 2 in (1.89 m)

Figure skating career
- Country: United States
- Discipline: Men's singles
- Coach: Oleg Makarov; Larisa Selezneva
- Skating club: Washington FSC
- Began skating: 2014

Medal record
Junior Grand Prix Final
Bronze medal – third place	2025–26 Nagoya	Singles

Lucius Kazanecki (born 21 April 2008) is an American figure skater. He is the 2025–26 Junior Grand Prix Final bronze medalist, a two-time Junior Grand Prix medalist and 2024 U.S. national junior champion.

== Career ==
=== Junior level ===
==== 2025–2026: Junior Grand Prix Final bronze ====
Kazanecki started skating in 2014. He was the 2024 U.S. junior champion.

His final season in the junior category was in 2025–26, when he also achieved his first Junior Grand Prix podiums, coming third at JGP Turkey and winning gold at JGP United Arab Emirates. Kazanecki won bronze at the 2025–26 Junior Grand Prix Final in Nagoya. He also participated in his first World Junior Figure Skating Championships in 2026, placing sixth.

=== Senior level ===
==== 2026–2027: Senior international debut ====
Kazanecki made his senior international debut in the 2026–27 figure skating season at the Kinoshita Group Cup.

== Programs ==
Competition programs by season
Season	Short program	Free skate program
2022–23	"Feeling Good": Performed by Michael Bublé; Choreo. by Nina Petrenko, Nikolai Morozov	"To Build a Home": Performed by The Cinematic Orchestra; Choreo. by Nina Petrenko, Nikolai Morozov
2023–24	"Caruso": Performed by Andrea Bocelli; Choreo. by Anna Zadorozhniuk	The White Crow: Composed by Ilan Eshkeri; Choreo. by Nina Petrenko
2024–25	Interstellar: 1. "Cornfield Chase"; 2. "Tick-Tock"; Composed by Dorian Marko, Hans Zimmer; Choreo. by Tommy Steenberg	"I Love You": Performed by Woodkid; Choreo. by Tommy Steenberg
2025–26	Interstellar	"Adiós Nonino": Composed by Astor Piazzolla; Performed by Forever Tango cast; Choreo. by Nina Petrenko
2026–27	"God the Hunter": Composed by Nico Cartosio; Choreo. by Lori Nichol	"Become a Mountain": Performed by Dan Deacon; Choreo. by Kaitlyn Weaver

== Competitive highlights ==
- GP – Event of the ISU Grand Prix Series
- CS – Event of the ISU Challenger Series
- JGP – Event of the ISU Junior Grand Prix
- TBD – Assigned
- WD – Withdrew from competition

Competition placements at senior level
Season	2024–25	2025–26	2026–27
U.S. Championships	16th	9th	
GP Cup of China			12th
CS Kinoshita Group Cup			13th
CS Trialeti Trophy			6th
CS Warsaw Cup			TBD

Competition placements at junior level
Season	2022–23	2023–24	2024–25	2025–26
World Junior Championships				6th
Junior Grand Prix Final				3rd
U.S. Championships	14th	1st		
JGP France	8th			
JGP Turkey				3rd
JGP United Arab Emirates				1st
Cranberry Cup			14th	

== Detailed results ==
ISU personal best scores in the +5/-5 GOE System
Segment	Type	Score	Event
Total	TSS	225.85	2025–26 Junior Grand Prix Final
Short program	TSS	74.89	2026 World Junior Championships
Short program	TES	41.53	2026 World Junior Championships
Short program	PCS	33.82	2026 CS Kinoshita Group Cup
Free skating	TSS	153.72	2025–26 Junior Grand Prix Final
Free skating	TES	84.85	2025–26 Junior Grand Prix Final
Free skating	PCS	68.87	2025–26 Junior Grand Prix Final

=== Senior level ===
Results in the 2024–25 season
Date	Event	SP		FS		Total	
Date	Event	P	Score	P	Score	P	Score
Jan 20–26, 2025	(United States) 2025 U.S. Championships	13	70.60	18	120.00	16	190.60

Results in the 2025–26 season
Date	Event	SP		FS		Total	
Date	Event	P	Score	P	Score	P	Score
Jan 6–11, 2026	(United States) 2026 U.S. Championships	10	75.72	7	151.35	9	227.07

Results in the 2026–27 season
Date	Event	SP		FS		Total	
Date	Event	P	Score	P	Score	P	Score
Sep 4–6, 2026	(Japan) 2026 CS Kinoshita Group Cup	12	66.14	11	123.15	13	189.29
Sep 30 – Oct 3, 2026	(Georgia (country)) 2026 CS Trialeti Trophy	5	72.22	6	138.38	6	210.60
Nov 6–8, 2026	2026 Cup of China	12	63.16	12	120.95	12	184.11
Nov 25–29, 2026	(Poland) 2026 CS Warsaw Cup						

=== Junior level ===
Results in the 2022–23 season
Date	Event	SP		FS		Total	
Date	Event	P	Score	P	Score	P	Score
Aug 24–27, 2022	2022 JGP France	9	55.45	8	112.40	8	167.85
Jan 23–29, 2023	(United States) 2023 U.S. Championships (Junior)	10	55.95	16	90.82	14	146.77

Results in the 2023–24 season
Date	Event	SP		FS		Total	
Date	Event	P	Score	P	Score	P	Score
Jan 22–28, 2024	(United States) 2024 U.S. Championships (Junior)	5	64.51	1	138.46	1	202.97

Results in the 2024–25 season
Date	Event	SP		FS		Total	
Date	Event	P	Score	P	Score	P	Score
Aug 8–11, 2024	(United States) 2024 Cranberry Cup International	16	55.20	13	113.78	14	168.98

Results in the 2025–26 season
Date	Event	SP		FS		Total	
Date	Event	P	Score	P	Score	P	Score
Aug 27–30, 2025	2025 JGP Turkey	3	70.71	3	131.96	3	202.67
Oct 8–11, 2025	2025 JGP United Arab Emirates	4	73.01	1	146.62	1	219.63
Dec 4–7, 2025	(Japan) 2025–26 Junior Grand Prix Final	4	72.13	3	153.72	3	225.85
Mar 3–8, 2026	(Estonia) 2026 World Junior Championships	11	74.89	7	144.47	6	219.36
