= Sophia Shifrin =

Russian-Israeli figure skater (born 2009)

Personal information
- Native name: София Шифрин
- Full name: Sophia Shifrin
- Other names: Sonya Shifrina
- Born: 11 August 2009 (age 17) Moscow, Russia
- Home town: Moscow, Russia
- Height: 163 cm (5 ft 4 in)

Figure skating career
- Country: Israel
- Coach: Svetlana Panova; Tatiana Moiseeva; Ilona Protasenya; Maria Kasumova
- Skating club: Ice Peaks Holon
- Began skating: 2014

Sophia Shifrin (Russian: София Шифрин, Hebrew: סופיה שיפרין; born 11 August 2009) is a Russian-born Israeli figure skater who competes for Israel. She is a three-time junior Israeli national champion (2024, 2025, 2026), the 2026 Junior Grand Prix Georgia silver medalist, a two-time Junior Grand Prix bronze medalist and a two-time NRW Trophy champion.

She has represented Israel at the Junior World Championships three times (2024–26), finishing as high as fourth in 2026.

She is the first Israeli woman to medal on the ISU Grand Prix circuit.

== Personal life ==
Sophia Shifrin was born in Moscow, Russia on 11 August 2009 to an Israeli father and Russian mother. She lives in both Moscow and Ashqelon, Israel and is an Israeli citizen. Her paternal side of the family resides in Israel.

== Career ==
=== Early career ===
Shifrin began skating at 5 years of age and competed domestically for Russia on the advanced novice level. She achieved bronze and silver medals at the Moscow Championships. In September 2022, Evgeni Plushenko shared that Shifrin would begin competing internationally for Israel. Shifrin debuted internationally for Israel on the advanced novice level in 2022 at the Santa Claus Cup in Budapest. She won the gold medal. She later went on to win her first Israeli national title on the advanced novice level.

She trained at the Angels of Plushenko Figure Skating Academy for two years (2022–24) before returning to her first coach, Svetlana Panova, whom she had trained with since early childhood. "I've been working with Svetlana Panova since childhood, since I was nine years old. For me, she is the best coach. She knows me very well as an athlete. I really like working with her" says Shifrin.

=== 2023–2024 season: Youth Olympic Games ===
Shifrin debuted on the Junior Grand Prix circuit at stages in Thailand and Armenia, finishing sixth and seventh respectively. In January, Shifrin represented Israel at the 2024 Winter Youth Olympic Games in Gangwon, South Korea. She finished the event in twelfth place.

At the 2024 Junior World Championships, she concluded the event in twenty-second overall. In early April, she won her first national title as a junior skater.

=== 2024–2025 season ===
Shifrin opened the new season competing at two Grand Prix assignments in Latvia and Poland; placing ninth and thirteenth respectively. She went onto earn the silver medal at the 2024 Santa Claus Cup behind Logan Higase-Chen of the United States. Two weeks later, Shifrin won her second national title as a junior. In early January, she won the gold medal at 2025 Bavarian Open in Oberstdorf, Germany.

At the 2025 Junior World Championships, Shifrin achieved a new personal best score of 168.21 points and finished the event in seventeenth place overall.

=== 2025–2026 season: Two Grand Prix medals, small world bronze ===
Shifrin was assigned to compete at two Grand Prix's in Baku, Azerbaijan and Abu Dhabi, UAE. She took first place in the short program in Baku, dropping to third place after the free skate and winning the bronze medal. This made her the first Israeli woman to medal on the ISU Grand Prix circuit in both the junior and senior categories. Two weeks later, she won the bronze medal in Abu Dhabi behind Australia's Hana Bath and Japan's Mao Shimada. Shifrin went onto win gold at the NRW Trophy and silver at Volvo Open. In December, she won her third junior national title.

In March, she competed at the 2026 World Junior Championships. Placing fourth in the short program and third in the free skate, she concluded the event in fourth overall. She won a small bronze medal for the free skate segment. Shifrin achieved new personal bests across both segments. “I am really, really happy!” said Shifrin after the free skate, “I was nervous before my skate, but I am so happy now. I just locked in and did everything that I had to do.”

During an interview in May, Shifrin shared that her successful season was the result of consistent hard work and preparation rather than luck, adding that competition performances reflect the work done in training. “For me, the brightest moments of the season were my first bronze medal at the Junior Grand Prix in Baku and the Junior World Championships,” Shifrin recalled. “In Baku, I didn't expect to get on to the podium although I had worked a lot during the off-season and was well prepared. That was my very first medal on the Junior Grand Prix and my first in an ISU competition.”

=== 2026–2027 season ===
Shifrin opened the new season at the Junior Grand Prix in Georgia; winning the silver medal. Shifrin later competed at the stage in Poland; needing to earn either a silver or gold medal to qualify for the Grand Prix Final. After placing fourth in the short program, she dropped to sixth overall following the free skate after falling on her triple Flip, as well as receiving four under rotation calls.

== Programs ==
Season	Short Program	Free Skating	Exhibition
2026–2027	Five Fragments on Paintings by Hieronymus Bosch and Alfred Schnittke; Agony Suite by Alfred Schnittke	Hallelujah by Jeff Buckley	
2025–2026	"Big Spender The Music of Fosse" by Bianca Marroquin, Rema Webb and The Fandango Girls, Cy Coleman; "Rich Man's Frug" by Fosse Orchestra, Cy Coleman	"Remembrances" (from Schindler's List soundtrack) by John Williams choreo. by Nadezhda Kanaeva	
2024–2025	"Prelude in E minor"; "Prelude in E minor (orchestral version)" by Frederic Chopin	"That Certain" by Charlie Feathers; "Good Night Moon" by Shivarec choreo. by Ilona Protasenia, Mariia Kasumova, Nedezda, Kanaeva	
2023–2024	"Bad Guy" by Billie Eilish	"Exogenesis: Symphony (Redemption;Part 4)"; "Exogenesis: Symphony Part 3 (Redemption)" by Muse	

== Competitive highlights ==
- JGP – Event of the ISU Grand Prix Series
- TBD – Assigned

Competition placements at junior level
Season	2023–24	2024–25	2025–26	2026–27
Youth Olympic Games	12th			
World Junior Championships	22nd	17th	4th	
Israeli Championships	1st	1st	1st	
JGP Armenia	7th			
JGP Azerbaijan			3rd	
JGP Georgia				2nd
JGP Latvia		9th		
JGP Poland		13th		6th
JGP Thailand	6th			
JGP United Arab Emirates			3rd	
Bavarian Open		1st		
NRW Trophy			1st	1st
Santa Claus Cup	6th	2nd		
Volvo Open Cup			2nd	

== Detailed results ==
ISU personal best scores in the +5/-5 GOE System
Segment	Type	Score	Event
Total	TSS	196.29	2026 JGP Georgia
Short program	TSS	66.67	2026 JGP Georgia
Short program	TES	39.26	2026 JGP Georgia
Short program	PCS	27.92	2026 World Junior Championships
Free skating	TSS	129.62	2026 JGP Georgia
Free skating	TES	70.21	2026 JGP Georgia
Free skating	PCS	59.59	2026 World Junior Championships

Results in the 2026–27 season
Date	Event	SP		FS		Total	
Date	Event	P	Score	P	Score	P	Score
24 – 26 September 2026	(Georgia (country)) 2026 JGP Georgia	4	66.67	1	129.62	2	196.29
8 – 10 October 2026	2026 JGP Poland	4	63.82	8	109.91	6	173.73
12 – 15 November, 2026	(Germany) 2026 NRW Trophy	1	65.31	1	126.12	1	191.43

Results in the 2025–26 season
Date	Event	SP		FS		Total	
Date	Event	P	Score	P	Score	P	Score
24 – 27 September 2025	2025 JGP Azerbaijan	1	61.57	5	115.38	3	176.95
8 – 11 October 2025	2025 JGP United Arab Emirates	2	63.25	3	118.65	3	181.90
13 – 16 November 2025	(Germany) 2025 NRW Trophy	1	65.62	1	128.52	1	194.14
10 – 11 December 2025	(Israel) 2026 Israeli Championships	1	61.94	1	119.17	1	181.11
22 – 25 January 2026	(Latvia) 2025 Volvo Open Cup	4	56.85	2	120.27	2	177.12
3 – 8 March 2026	(Estonia) 2026 World Junior Championships	4	65.38	3	128.42	4	193.80

Results in the 2024–25 season
Date	Event	SP		FS		Total	
Date	Event	P	Score	P	Score	P	Score
28 – 31 August 2024	2024 JGP Latvia	8	53.98	10	95.69	9	149.67
25 – 28 September 2024	2024 JGP Poland	6	56.73	14	90.00	13	146.73
27 Nov – 2 Dec 2024	(Hungary) 2024 Santa Claus Cup	1	56.09	2	107.54	2	163.63
11 – 12 December 2024	(Israel) 2025 Israeli Championships	1	64.24	1	116.45	1	180.69
20 – 26 January 2025	(Germany) 2025 Bavarian Open	1	65.96	1	121.25	1	187.21
24 Feb – 2 March 2025	(Hungary) 2025 World Junior Championships	13	59.91	18	108.70	17	168.21

Results in the 2023–24 season
Date	Event	SP		FS		Total	
Date	Event	P	Score	P	Score	P	Score
23 – 26 August 2023	(Thailand) 2023 JGP Bangkok	9	53.07	5	110.11	6	163.18
4 – 7 October 2023	2023 JGP Armenia	9	49.61	7	105.78	7	155.39
29 Nov – 4 Dec 2023	(Hungary) 2023 Santa Claus Cup	4	53.57	6	96.54	6	150.11
27 Jan – 1 Feb 2024	(South Korea) 2024 Youth Winter Olympics	12	49.54	10	103.00	12	152.54
26 Feb – 3 March	(Chinese Taipei) 2024 World Junior Championships	22	53.84	21	105.93	22	159.77
3 – 4 April 2024	(Israel) 2024 Israeli Championships	2	48.60	1	98.71	1	147.31
