= Mayuko Oka =

Japanese figure skater

Personal information
- Native name: 岡 万佑子
- Full name: Mayuko Oka
- Born: 13 September 2009 (age 17) Hokkaido, Japan
- Home town: Kyoto, Japan
- Height: 153 cm (5 ft 0 in)

Figure skating career
- Country: Japan
- Coach: Mie Hamada; Hiroaki Sato; Satsuki Muramoto
- Skating club: Kinoshita Academy
- Began skating: 2015
Medal record
World Junior Championships
Bronze medal – third place	2026 Tallinn	Singles

Mayuko Oka (Japanese: 岡 万佑子; born 13 September 2009) is a Japanese figure skater. She is the 2026 World Junior bronze medalist, the 2025 Junior Grand Prix in Turkey gold medalist and the 2025-26 Japan Junior Championships silver medalist.

She has performed the triple Axel in competition.

== Personal life ==
Mayuko Oka was born on 13 September 2009 in Hokkaido, Japan.

In 2024, Oka and her mother moved to Kyoto so Oka could train at the Kinoshita Skating Academy under Mie Hamada.

== Career ==
=== Early career ===
Oka began skating in 2015 at age of six. She initially trained at the Mikaho Figure Skating Club in Higashi-ku, Sapporo before transferring to the ROYCE' Figure Skating Club in Hokkaido, where Mami Yamada became her coach.

During the 2022–23 figure skating season, Oka won the silver medal on the advanced novice level at the 2022–23 Japan Junior Championships. With that result, she was selected to compete at the junior level national championships, where she finished in fifteenth place. The following season, Oka moved up to the junior domestic level and placed ninth at 2023–24 Japan Junior Championships.

=== 2024–2025 season ===
Prior to the season, Oka relocated to Kyoto and joined the Kinoshita Skating Academy, where Mie Hamada, Hiroaki Sato, and Satsuki Muramoto became her new coaches.

In November, she finished seventh at 2024–25 Japan Junior Championships. Oka then went on to make her senior national debut at the 2024–25 Japan Championships the following month, where she placed sixteenth overall.

=== 2025–2026 season: International debut and World Junior bronze medal ===
Oka debuted internationally at the 2025 JGP Turkey, where she won the gold medal in her Junior Grand Prix debut. The following month, Oka, she won the silver medal at the 2025 JGP Azerbaijan. These results garnered Oka enough points to qualify for the 2025–26 Junior Grand Prix Final.

In November, Oka competed at the 2025–26 Japan Junior Championships. She placed eighth in the short program and won the free skate, the latter of which included a cleanly landed triple Axel. Oka won the silver medal overall behind Mao Shimada. A couple weeks later, Oka competed at the 2025–26 Junior Grand Prix Final. She placed third in the short program but dropped to sixth place overall after falling on her triple Axel attempt and under rotating her triple-triple jump combination during the free skate.

Two weeks later, she competed at the senior national championships, where she placed sixth overall after landing two successful triple Axels in both program segments.

In March, Oka made her ISU Championship debut at the 2026 World Junior Championships in Tallinn, Estonia. She achieved a personal best score in the short program segment, placing second. Following her performance, she shared, "I wasn’t super nervous for my debut at Junior Worlds. I was determined to perform with a strong mindset and I wanted to achieve my personal best, and I was able to do that by one point, so I’m very, very happy about it.". In the free skate segment, Oka placed fourth in that segment after falling on her triple Axel and underrotating a planned triple Lutz. Her combined scores led her to win the bronze medal overall behind Hana Bath and Mao Shimada. "I had some mistakes on my jumps, but I was able to enjoy my performance until the end," she said following the event. "I was able to stay calm and focused. This was my first Junior Worlds, so my goal was to give it my all and constantly challenge myself to improve. I realised that focusing on my own performance was the most important thing.".

=== 2026–2027 season ===
During the off-season in June, Oka revealed that she has been suffering from a slight backache and in the following months she withdrew from all the domestic competitions she had initially entered. She was initially assigned to the fourth and seventh events of the Junior Grand Prix Series in Turkey and Poland, respectively, but she later withdrew from both her assignments.

== Programs ==
Season	Short program	Free skating	Exhibition
2026–2027	Don Quixote; Entrance of Don Quixote; Kitri's Variation – Act 3 (Ballet Version): Minkus; Coda by Nayden Todorov & Sofia National Opera Orchestra choreo. by Kana Muramoto	Everything Everywhere All At Once by Son Lux choreo. by Kaitlyn Weaver	
2025–2026	Moment Magico by Youn Sun Nah & Ulf Wakenius choreo. by Kana Muramoto	Some Bright Morning; The Flood Is Following Me; Other Song by Caroline Shaw choreo. by Kaitlyn Weaver	City of Stars / Audition (The Fools Who Dream) (from La La Land) performed by Bailey Pelkman
2024–2025	Fire Dance by Jennifer Thomas choreo. by Kana Muramoto	Cleopatra by Trevor Jones choreo. by Cathy Reed	
2023–2024	Lilies of the Valley (from Pina) by Jun Miyake choreo. by Takana Ito, Mami Yamada	Rhapsody on a Theme of Paganini, Op. 43: Var. 6. L'istesso tempo by Sergei Rachmaninoff performed by Nobuyuki Tsujii, Royal Liverpool Philharmonic, & Vasily Petrenko choreo. by Misao Sato	

== Competitive highlights ==
- JGP – Event of the ISU Grand Prix Series
- TBD – Assigned
- WD – Withdrew from competition

Competition placements at senior level
Season	2024–25	2025–26
Japan Championships	16th	6th

Competition placements at junior level
Season	2022–23	2023–24	2024–25	2025–26	2026–27
World Junior Championships				3rd	
Junior Grand Prix Final				6th	
Japan Championships	15th	9th	7th	2nd	
JGP Azerbaijan				2nd	
JGP Turkey				1st	

== Detailed results ==
ISU personal best scores in the +5/-5 GOE System
Segment	Type	Score	Event
Total	TSS	199.17	2025 JGP Turkey
Short program	TSS	69.77	2026 World Junior Championships
Short program	TES	39.13	2026 World Junior Championships
Short program	PCS	30.64	2026 World Junior Championships
Free skating	TSS	131.14	2025 JGP Turkey
Free skating	TES	71.67	2025 JGP Turkey
Free skating	PCS	60.93	2026 World Junior Championships

=== Senior level ===
Results in the 2025–26 season
Date	Event	SP		FS		Total	
Date	Event	P	Score	P	Score	P	Score
Dec 18–21, 2025	2025–26 Japan Championships	5	73.20	6	138.53	6	211.73

Results in the 2024–25 season
Date	Event	SP		FS		Total	
Date	Event	P	Score	P	Score	P	Score
Dec 19–22, 2024	2024–25 Japan Championships	17	60.71	17	121.11	16	181.82

=== Junior level ===
Results in the 2025–26 season
Date	Event	SP		FS		Total	
Date	Event	P	Score	P	Score	P	Score
Aug 27–30, 2025	2025 JGP Turkey	2	68.03	2	131.14	1	199.17
Sep 24–27, 2025	2025 JGP Azerbaijan	5	58.03	2	126.19	2	184.22
Nov 22–24, 2025	2025–26 Japan Championships (Junior)	8	58.09	1	136.73	2	194.82
Dec 4–7, 2025	(Japan) 2025–26 Junior Grand Prix Final	3	67.93	6	121.70	6	189.63
Mar 3–8, 2026	(Estonia) 2026 World Junior Figure Skating Championships	2	69.77	4	127.40	3	197.17

Results in the 2024–25 season
Date	Event	SP		FS		Total	
Date	Event	P	Score	P	Score	P	Score
Dec 19–22, 2024	2024–25 Japan Championships (Junior)	9	58.23	6	118.55	7	176.78

Results in the 2023–24 season
Date	Event	SP		FS		Total	
Date	Event	P	Score	P	Score	P	Score
Dec 20–24, 2023	2023–24 Japan Championships (Junior)	8	60.04	12	103.67	9	163.71

Results in the 2022–23 season
Date	Event	SP		FS		Total	
Date	Event	P	Score	P	Score	P	Score
Dec 21–25, 2022	2022–23 Japan Championships (Junior)	14	52.99	18	90.00	15	142.99
