= Sena Takahashi =

Japanese figure skater (born 2010)

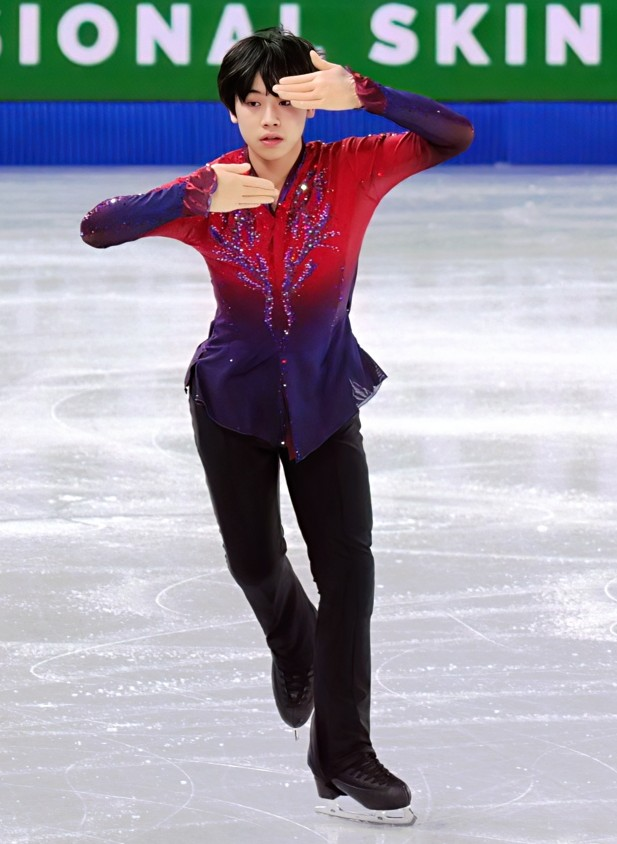
- Takahashi during the short program at the 2024–25 Junior Grand Prix Final

Personal information
- Native name: 高橋星名
- Born: 29 January 2010 (age 16) Kanagawa, Japan
- Home town: Kyoto
- Height: 1.60 m (5 ft 3 in)

Figure skating career
- Country: Japan
- Coach: Mie Hamada; Satsuki Muramoto; Hiroaki Sato; Noriyuki Kanzaki
- Skating club: Kinoshita Academy
- Began skating: 2014

Sena Takahashi (高橋星名, Takahashi Sena; born 29 January 2010) is a Japanese figure skater. He is a five-time ISU Junior Grand Prix medalist and the 2024–25 Japanese Junior national silver medalist.

== Personal life ==
Takahashi was born on 29 January 2010, in Kanagawa, Japan. As a hobby, he enjoys cooking.

His figure skating idol is Cha Jun-hwan, who he got to meet at the Japanese ice show, Dreams on Ice, in 2024.

== Career ==
=== Early career ===
Takahashi began figure skating in 2014. While in attendance at the 2017–18 Japan Championships, Takahashi met Mie Hamada and soon moved from Kanagawa to Takatsuki, Osaka to train under her at the Kansai University Skating Club.

Takahashi debuted at the 2019–20 Japan Basic Novice Championships, where he finished twenty-seventh. Following that season, Hamada moved to Uji, Kyoto to coach at the Kinoshita Academy Kyoto Ice Arena and Takahashi would relocate as well to continue being coached by Hamada.

Going on to compete at the 2020–21 Japan Basic Novice Championships, Takahashi finished fifth.

=== 2021–22 season ===
Debuting as an advanced novice skater, Takahashi won the bronze medal at the 2021–22 Japan Advanced Novice Championships and was given the opportunity to compete at the 2021–22 Japan Junior Championships, where he placed ninth.

=== 2022–23 season ===
Starting his season at the 2022–23 Japan Advanced Novice Championships, Takahashi won the gold medal. He would go on to compete at the 2022–23 Japan Junior Championships, where he finished ninth.

As the advanced novice champion, Takahashi was invited to perform in the gala at the 2023 World Team Trophy.

=== 2023–24 season ===
Competing at the 2023–24 Japan Junior Championships, Takahashi finished eighth. With this placement, he was selected to compete at the senior level championships, where he finished twentieth.

=== 2024–25 season ===
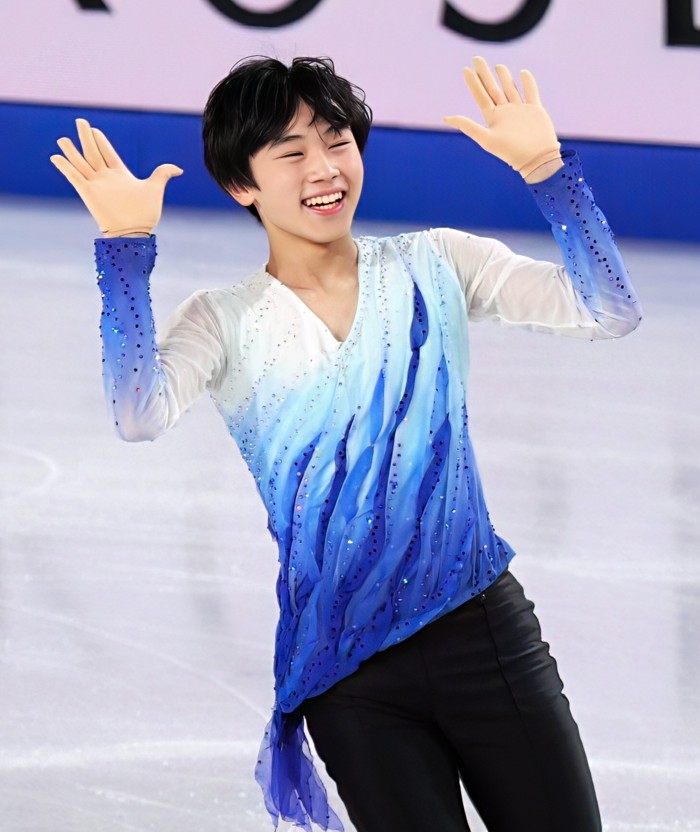
Takahashi following his free skate at the 2024––25 Junior Grand Prix Final

Making his international debut on the 2024–25 ISU Junior Grand Prix circuit, Takahashi won the gold medal at 2024 JGP Latvia. Following the event, Takahashi expressed his shock at the result. "I never ever would have expected to win. Everything is new for me and the first time and I just came here to have the most possible fun and I did. I was very nervous ahead of my skate. Last season I was injured a lot and also not yet good enough for the JGP so that’s why this is my first season on the JGP." He would go on to compete at 2024 JGP Poland, where he won the short program but faltered in the free skate, placing sixth in that segment of the competition, but managed to hang onto second place overall. With these placements, Takahashi qualified for the Junior Grand Prix Final.

In late November, Takahashi competed at the 2024–25 Japan Junior Championships, where he won the silver medal behind Rio Nakata. This result ensured his qualification to compete at the senior championships.

At the 2024–25 Junior Grand Prix Final in Grenoble, France, Takahashi placed sixth of the six competitors in the short program after missing his opening triple axel and failing to perform his jump combination. However, he managed to deliver a strong free skate, landing all his jumps cleanly. He would place third in that competition segment and climb to fourth place overall. Following the event, Takahashi would admit to being "very anxious and nervous" during the short program but that he was pleased with his free skate performance, saying, "I'm happy because I didn't give up until the end... Time just flew by, and I was having so much fun that I was concentrating." Two weeks later, Takahashi finished fourteenth at the 2024–25 Japan Championships and was subsequently named to the World Junior team.

At the 2025 World Junior Championships in Debrecen, Hungary, Takahashi concluded the season by placing ninth at the event. “I was nervous so I was surprised but I could regain my control so I'm glad,” he said after the free skate. “Even though I made some mistakes, I got a good score. So I'm happy. I was nervous, but I was able to enjoy skating until the very end, and I could bring out a good performance.”

=== 2025–26 season ===
Takahashi began the season by competing on the 2025–26 ISU Junior Grand Prix series, winning silver at 2025 JGP Turkey and bronze at 2025 JGP United Arab Emirates. He was named as the first alternate for the 2025–26 Junior Grand Prix Final.

In late November, Takahashi competed at the 2025–26 Japan Junior Championships, where he finished in fifth place overall. With this placement, he was invited to compete at the senior national championships, where he finished fifteenth.

=== 2026–27 season ===
Takahashi opened the new season on the Junior Grand Prix series. He placed 4th at the JGP in Latvia; later winning bronze in Georgia.

== Programs ==
Season	Short program	Free skating	Exhibition
2026–2027	East of Eden by Lee Holdridge choreo. by Kana Muramoto	West Side Story by Leonard Bernstein choreo. by Kaitlyn Weaver	
2025–2026	You Will Be Found (from Dear Evan Hansen) by Benj Pasek & Justin Paul performed by Ben Platt, Kristolyn Lloyd, Will Roland, & Laura Dreyfuss choreo. by Kana Muramoto	The Mission; Falls; Brothers; Vita Nostra; On Earth As It Is In Heaven by Ennio Morricone choreo. by Misha Ge	The Greatest Show (from The Greatest Showman) by Benj Pasek, Justin Paul, & Rob Mathes performed by Hugh Jackman, Keala Settle, Zac Efron, & Zendaya
2024–2025	This Is Me (from The Greatest Showman) by Benj Pasek, Justin Paul, & Rob Mathes performed by Keala Settle choreo. by Kana Muramoto	The Four Seasons; Concerto No. 2 in G Minor, RV 315 11 L'estate: I. Allegro; Violin Concerto in G minor, Op. 8, No. 2, RV 315, L'estate (Summer): Ill. Prest; Concerto No. 4 in F Minor, RV297, L'inverno: II. Largo; Concerto No. 4 in F Minor, Op. 8, RV 297, Winter: I. Allegro non molto; Violin Concerto in F minor, Op. 8, No. 4, RV 297, 11 L'inverno (Winter) by Antonio Vivaldi choreo. by Kenji Miyamoto	The Greatest Show (from The Greatest Showman) by Benj Pasek, Justin Paul, & Rob Mathes performed by Hugh Jackman, Keala Settle, Zac Efron, & Zendaya
2023–2024	Tucker: The Man and His Dream; The Car of Tomorrow – Today!; Lone Bank Loan Blues; Toast of the Town by Joe Jackson choreo. by Cathy Reed	Les Misérables; Prologue (Look Down) / At the End of the Day; I Dreamed a Dream / Lovely Ladies / Who Am I?; Bring Him Home / Finale: Do You Hear the People Sing? (Reprise) (Look Down) / At the End of the Day by Claude-Michel Schönberg performed by Bournemouth Symphony Orchestra & Seann Alderking choreo. by Cathy Reed	
2022–2023	Tucker: The Man and His Dream; The Car of Tomorrow – Today!; Lone Bank Loan Blues; Toast of the Town by Joe Jackson choreo. by Cathy Reed	Violin Concerto in D major, Op. 35 by Pyotr Ilyich Tchaikovsky	Crocodile Rock by Elton John

== Competitive highlights ==
- JGP – Event of the ISU Junior Grand Prix Series
- TBD – Assigned
- WD – Withdrew from competition

Competition placements at senior level
Season	2023–24	2024–25	2025–26
Japan Championships	20th	14th	15th

Competition placements at junior level
Season	2021–22	2022–23	2023–24	2024–25	2025–26	2026–27
World Junior Championships				9th		
Junior Grand Prix Final				4th		
Japan Championships	12th	9th	8th	2nd	5th	
JGP Latvia				1st		4th
JGP Poland				2nd		
JGP Turkey					2nd	
JGP United Arab Emirates					3rd	
JGP Georgia						3rd

== Detailed results ==
ISU personal best scores in the +5/-5 GOE System
Segment	Type	Score	Event
Total	**TSS**	**229.66**	2024 JGP Latvia
Short program	**TSS**	**86.19**	2026 JGP Georgia
Short program	TES	48.08	2026 JGP Georgia
Short program	PCS	38.60	2026 JGP Latvia
Free skating	**TSS**	**148.61**	2024 JGP Latvia
Free skating	TES	75.01	2024 JGP Latvia
Free skating	PCS	73.60	2024 JGP Latvia

Current personal best scores are highlighted in bold.

=== Senior level ===
Results in the 2025–26 season
Date	Event	SP		FS		Total	
Date	Event	P	Score	P	Score	P	Score
Dec 18–21, 2025	2025–26 Japan Championships	11	73.82	16	131.62	15	205.44

2024–25 season
Date	Event	SP	FS	Total
19–22 December 2024	2024–25 Japan Championships	8; 77.87	17; 131.92	14; 209.79
2023–24 season
Date	Event	SP	FS	Total
20–24 December 2023	2023–24 Japan Championships	19; 68.28	22; 123.49	20; 191.77

=== Junior level ===
2026–27 season
Date	Event	SP	FS	Total
19–22 December 2024	2026 JGP Georgia	1 **86.19**	5 128.68	3 214.87
27–29 August 2026	2026 JGP Latvia	1 83.75	5 130.03	4 213.78

2025–26 season
Date	Event	SP	FS	Total
22–24 November 2025	2025–26 Japan Junior Championships	8; 69.08	4; 135.37	5; 204.45
8–11 October 2025	2025 JGP United Arab Emirates	1; 81.43	4; 135.29	3; 216.72
27–30 August 2025	2025 JGP Turkey	1; 82.87	2; 142.97	2; 225.84
2024–25 season
Date	Event	SP	FS	Total
25 February – 2 March 2025	2025 World Junior Championships	7; 76.85	11; 139.60	9; 216.45
5–8 December 2024	2024–25 Junior Grand Prix Final	6; 61.83	3; 142.57	4; 204.40
15–17 November 2024	2024–25 Japan Junior Championships	1; 79.28	4; 133.71	2; 212.99
25–28 September 2024	2024 JGP Poland	1; 80.25	6; 118.17	2; 198.42
28–31 August 2024	2024 JGP Latvia	1; 81.05	1; **148.61**	1; **229.66**
2023–24 season
Date	Event	SP	FS	Total
17–19 November 2023	2023–24 Japan Junior Championships	9; 62.93	7; 126.05	8; 188.98
2022–23 season
Date	Event	SP	FS	Total
25–27 November 2022	2022–23 Japan Junior Championships	8; 60.79	9; 118.37	9; 179.16
2021–22 season
Date	Event	SP	FS	Total
19–21 November 2021	2021–22 Japan Junior Championships	17; 53.45	9; 109.71	12; 163.16
