= ISU Junior Grand Prix in Thailand =

International figure skating competition

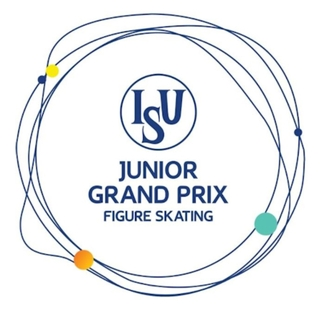
- Status: Active
- Genre: ISU Junior Grand Prix
- Frequency: Occasional
- Venue: IWIS International Training Center
- Location: Bangkok
- Country: Thailand
- Inaugurated: 2023
- Previous event: 2026
- Organizer: Figure & Speed Skating Association of Thailand

The ISU Junior Grand Prix in Thailand is an international figure skating competition sanctioned by the International Skating Union (ISU), organized and hosted by the Figure & Speed Skating Association of Thailand (Thai: สมาคมฟิกเกอร์และสปีดสเก็ตติ้งแห่งประเทศไทย). It is held periodically as an event of the ISU Junior Grand Prix of Figure Skating (JGP), a series of international competitions exclusively for junior-level skaters. Medals may be awarded in men's singles, women's singles, and ice dance. Skaters earn points based on their results at the qualifying competitions each season, and the top skaters or teams in each discipline are invited to then compete at the Junior Grand Prix of Figure Skating Final.

== History ==
The ISU Junior Grand Prix of Figure Skating (JGP) was established by the International Skating Union (ISU) in 1997 and consists of a series of seven international figure skating competitions exclusively for junior-level skaters. The locations of the JGP events change every year. While all seven competitions feature the men's, women's, and ice dance events, only four competitions each season feature the pairs event. Skaters earn points based on their results each season, and the top skaters or teams in each discipline are then invited to compete at the Junior Grand Prix of Figure Skating Final.

Skaters are eligible to compete on the junior-level circuit if they are at least 13 years old before 1 July of the respective season, but not yet 19 (for single skaters), 21 (for men and women in ice dance and women in pair skating), or 23 (for men in pair skating). Competitors are chosen by their respective skating federations. The number of entries allotted to each ISU member nation in each discipline is determined by their results at the prior World Junior Figure Skating Championships.

Thailand hosted its first Junior Grand Prix competition in 2023 in Bangkok. Rio Nakata of Japan won the men's event, Ami Nakai of Japan won the women's event, and Leah Neset and Artem Markelov of the United States won the ice dance event.

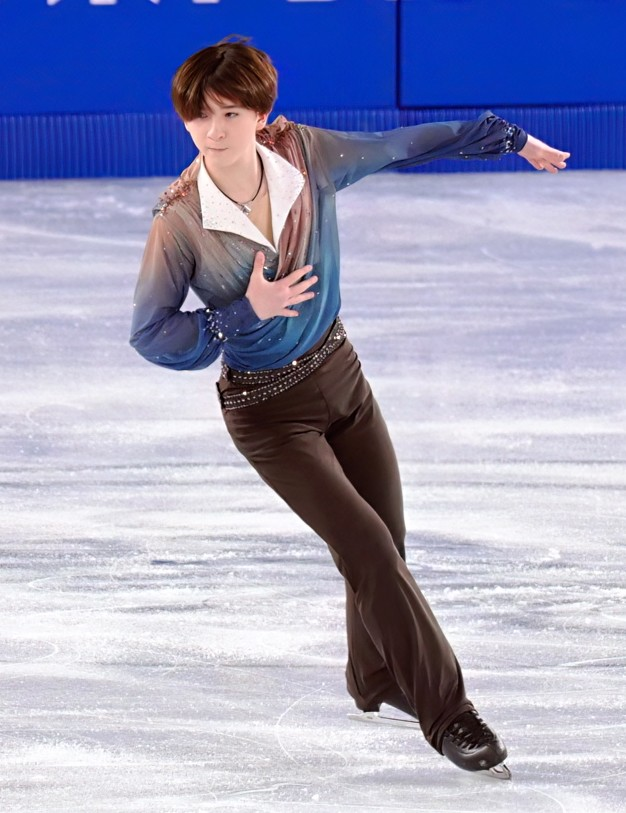
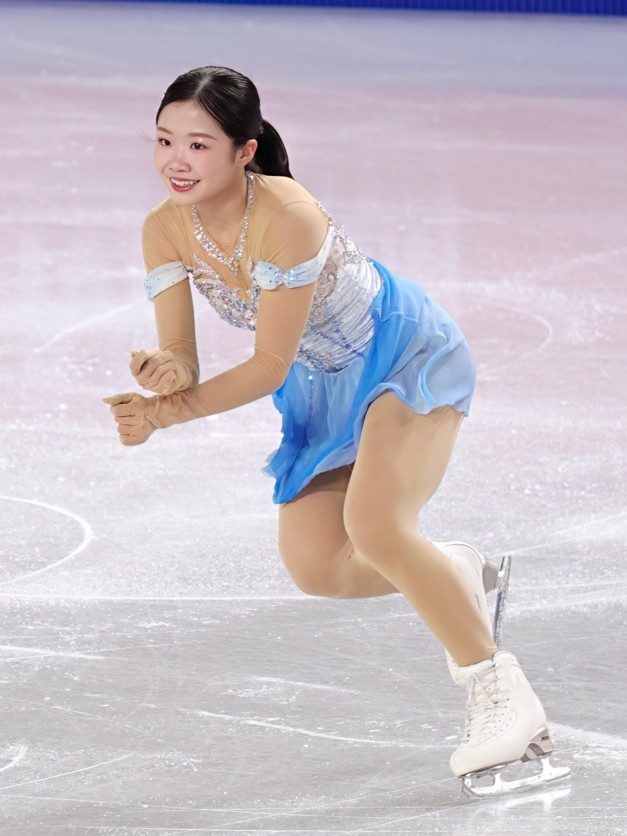
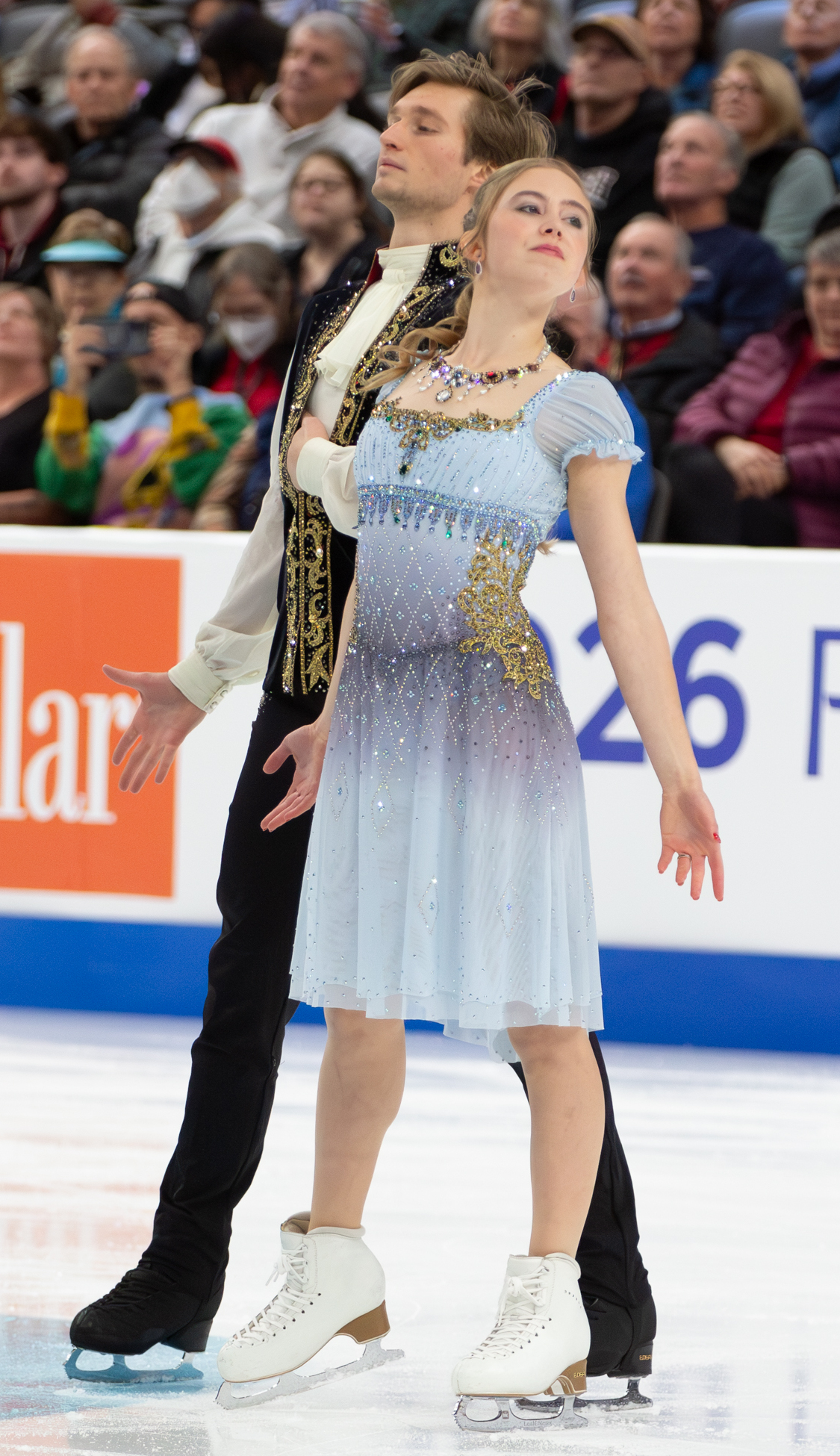
The inaugural Junior Grand Prix in Thailand champions: Rio Nakata of Japan (men's singles); Ami Nakai of Japan (women's singles); and Leah Neset and Artem Markelov of the United States (ice dance)

Thailand hosted the event again in 2024 and 2025. On 30 June 2026, the ISU announced that figure skaters from Russia and Belarus would be allowed to compete at international competitions as Individual Neutral Athletes (AINs). Each skater was required to undergo an individual assessment conducted by the ISU Council to determine whether they met the criteria for neutral status, which included having not previously taken active part in the Russian war in Ukraine, as well as not having actively or publicly supported the war. As AINs, Russian and Belarusian skaters were not permitted to compete under their national flags or anthems. The winners of all three events at the 2026 Junior Grand Prix competition in Thailand were from Russia.

== Medalists ==
=== Men's singles ===
In 2023, Dwayne Li became the first skater from New Zealand to win a Junior Grand Prix medal in any discipline. In 2024, Li won New Zealand's first ever Junior Grand Prix gold medal in any discipline. In 2026, Hiro Kaewtathip was the first skater from Thailand to win a Junior Grand Prix medal.

Men's event medalists
Year	Location	Gold	Silver	Bronze	Ref.
2023	Bangkok	(Japan) Rio Nakata	(France) François Pitot	(New Zealand) Dwayne Li	
2024	Bangkok	(New Zealand) Dwayne Li	(Japan) Rio Nakata	(China) Tian Tonghe	
2025	Bangkok	(Japan) Rio Nakata	(United States) Patrick Blackwell	(New Zealand) Dwayne Li	
2026	Bangkok	(Individual Neutral Athletes) Lev Lazarev	(New Zealand) Dwayne Li	(Thailand) Hiro Kaewtathip	

=== Women's singles ===
In 2024, Wang Yihan became the first Chinese woman to win a Junior Grand Prix title.

Women's event medalists
Year	Location	Gold	Silver	Bronze	Ref.
2023	Bangkok	(Japan) Ami Nakai	(South Korea) Kim Yu-seong	(South Korea) Han Hee-sue	
2024	Bangkok	(China) Wang Yihan	(Japan) Yo Takagi	(Japan) Mei Okada	
2025	Bangkok	(Japan) Mao Shimada	(Japan) Mei Okada	(South Korea) Hwang Jeong-youl	
2026	Bangkok	(Individual Neutral Athletes) Sofia Dzepka	(Japan) Sumika Kanazawa	(Canada) Lia Cho	

=== Pairs ===
Pairs event medalists
Year	Location	Gold	Silver	Bronze	Ref.
2023	Bangkok	No pairs competitions			
2024	Bangkok	No pairs competitions			
2025	Bangkok	(China); Guo Rui; Zhang Yiwen	(Canada); Jazmine Desrochers; Kieran Thrasher	(United States); Sofia Jarmoc; Luke Witkowski	
2026	Bangkok	No pairs competition			

=== Ice dance ===
Ice dance event medalists
Year	Location	Gold	Silver	Bronze	Ref.
2023	Bangkok	(United States); Leah Neset; Artem Markelov	(France); Célina Fradji; Jean-Hans Fourneaux	(South Korea); Kim Jin-ny; Lee Nam-u	
2024	Bangkok	(Italy); Noemi Maria Tali; Noah Lafornara	(United States); Hana Maria Aboian; Daniil Veselukhin	(United States); Elliana Peal; Ethan Peal	
2025	Bangkok	(United States); Hana Maria Aboian; Daniil Veselukhin	(Canada); Charlie Anderson; Cayden Dawson	(France); Lea Hienne; Louis Varescon	
2026	Bangkok	(Individual Neutral Athletes); Mariia Fefelova; Artem Valov	(Italy); Zoe Bianchi; Daniel Basile	(France); Lea Hienne; Louis Varescon	
