= Caleb Farrington =

American figure skater

Personal information
- Born: 4 September 2008 (age 18) Illinois, U.S.
- Home town: Newark, Delaware, U.S.
- Height: 165 cm (5 ft 5 in)

Figure skating career
- Country: United States
- Discipline: Men's singles
- Coach: Priscilla Hill; Roland Burghart
- Skating club: Patriot Figure Skating Club
- Began skating: 2015

Caleb Farrington (born 4 September 2008) is an American figure skater. He placed second at the U.S. Junior National Championships (2026), third at Junior Grand Prix in Azerbaijan (2025), and first in Junior Men's singles at the Santa Claus Cup (2025).

Farrington competes domestically and internationally at the junior level. He has competed on the Junior Grand Prix circuit representing the United States.

== Personal life ==
Farrington's parents are named Mike and Kelly, and he has two siblings named Ainsley and Pep. He has two cats, Storm and Toro, and two dogs, Sasha and Lemon. He is a homeschooler. He enjoys cooking and drawing, and spending time with his pets.

== Career ==
=== Early years ===
Farrington began skating in 2015 at the age of 7. Aside from men's singles, he has also competed in Theater on Ice. His former coaches include Julia Sretenski, Pavel Filchenkov, and Viktor Pfeifer. He skated with Pfeifer's group in Wilmington, Delaware through the 2023–24 season.

=== 2023–24 season: Junior international debut ===
Farrington made his international junior debut at the 2024 Tayside Trophy in Dundee, Scotland, placing 5th.

Domestically, Farrington was the novice boys gold medalist at Eastern Sectionals. This placement qualified him to compete at the 2024 U.S. Junior National Championships, where he placed 11th overall.

After this season, he left Pfeifer's coaching group, and began skating with Oleg Makarov, Larisa Selezneva, Patch David, and Alex Zahradnicek. He was a member of the IceWorks Skating Club.

=== 2024–25 season ===
Farrington competed domestically at junior, and placed 6th at Eastern Sectionals.

After this season, he changed coaches to start skating with Priscilla Hill and Roland Burghart. He joined the Patriot Skating Club in Newark, Delaware.

=== 2025–26 season: First Junior Grand Prix medal ===
Farrington placed 7th in his first event of the season, in junior men's at the 2025 Cranberry Cup International.

He placed third for the bronze medal at his JGP debut in Baku, Azerbaijan. In the short program, his triple lutz-triple toe loop combination was worth 12.29 points, the highest score given for any element in the short program at this event. Only two skaters attempted quadruple jumps in the free skate, and his clean quadruple toe loop was the only successful attempt. His second JGP appearance was in Poland, where he placed 5th overall.

He placed second at the 2026 Junior U.S. Championships, to which he qualified by placing second at 2026 Eastern Sectionals. He made two other international appearances this season, winning both events: the 2025 Santa Claus Cup in Hungary, and the 2026 Coupe du Printemps in Luxembourg.

=== 2026–27 season ===
Farrington's first appearance in the 2026–27 season was at 2026 ISU Junior Grand Prix in Latvia. He placed eighth overall.

== Programs ==
Competition programs by season
Season	Short program	Free skate program
2025–26	"Otoño Porteño": Composed by Ástor Piazzolla; Choreo. by Nicholas Buckland	"Fantastic Beasts": From Fantastic Beasts and Where to Find Them; Composed by James Newton Howard; Choreo. by Nicholas Buckland
2026–27	Medley: 1. "Paxi Ni Ngongo"; Composed by Bonga; 2. "Magalenha" & "Fanfarra (Cabua-Le-Le)"; Composed by Sergio Mendes & Carlinhos Brown; Choreo. by Katherine Hill & Mathew Gates	Medley: 1. "The Strange One"; Composed by Abel Korzeniowski; 2. "Angels & Demons"; From Angels & Demons; Composed by Hans Zimmer; 3. "November"; Composed by Max Richter; Choreo. by Katherine Hill & Johnny Weir

== Competitive highlights ==
- JGP – Event of the ISU Grand Prix Series
- TBD – Assigned

Competition placements at junior level
Season	2023–24	2025–26	2026–27
U.S. Championships	11th	2nd	
JGP Azerbaijan		3rd	
JGP Latvia			8th
JGP Poland		5th	14th
Coupe du Printemps		1st	
Cranberry Cup		7th	
Santa Claus Cup		1st	
Tayside Trophy	5th		

== Detailed results ==
=== Junior level ===
Results in the 2023–24 season
Date	Event	SP		FS		Total	
Date	Event	P	Score	P	Score	P	Score
Jan 22–28, 2024	(United States) 2024 U.S. Championships (Junior)	14	53.45	11	107.96	11	161.41
Oct 12–13, 2024	(United Kingdom) 2024 Tayside Trophy	4	55.65	5	105.93	5	161.58

Results in the 2025–26 season
Date	Event	SP		FS		Total	
Date	Event	P	Score	P	Score	P	Score
Aug 7–10, 2025	(United States) 2025 Cranberry Cup International	5	63.53	10	105.40	7	168.93
Sep 24–27, 2025	2025 JGP Azerbaijan	4	70.83	2	139.83	3	210.66
Oct 1–4, 2025	2025 JGP Poland	6	68.97	5	135.83	5	204.80
Nov 26–30, 2025	(Hungary) 2025 Santa Claus Cup	1	69.03	1	128.32	1	197.35
Jan 4–11, 2026	(United States) 2026 U.S. Championships (Junior)	3	73.71	2	137.33	2	211.04
Mar 13–15, 2026	(Luxembourg) 2026 Coupe du Printemps	1	73.30	1	128.58	1	201.88

Results in the 2026–27 season
Date	Event	SP		FS		Total	
Date	Event	P	Score	P	Score	P	Score
Aug 27–29, 2026	2026 JGP Latvia	8	65.07	8	120.20	8	185.27
Oct 8–10, 2026	2026 JGP Poland	5	66.87	16	98.99	14	165.86
