= Genrikh Gartung =

Figure skater (born 2007)

Personal information
- Born: 25 October 2007 (age 19) Nizhny Tagil, Russia
- Height: 180 cm (5 ft 11 in)

Figure skating career
- Country: Germany
- Discipline: Men's singles
- Coach: Niko Ulanovsky; Ria Schiffner
- Skating club: ECO Oberstdorf
- Began skating: 2011

Medal record
German Championships
Gold medal – first place	2026 Oberstdorf	Singles

Genrikh Gartung (Russian: Генрих Гартунг; born 25 October 2007) is a Russian-born figure skater who competes for Germany. He is the 2026 CS Nebelhorn Trophy silver medalist and the 2026 German national champion. At the junior level, he is a three-time ISU Junior Grand Prix bronze medalist and the 2025 German national champion.

== Personal life ==
Gartung was born 25 October 2007 in Nizhny Tagil, Russia. His great-grandfather was a Volga German, and his great-grandmother came from a German family based in Saint Petersburg. Growing up, Gartung often visited his aunt who lived in Germany, which influenced his decision to skate for Germany.

== Career ==
=== Early career ===
Skating for Russia, Gartung trained under Viktoria Volchkova. He competed in the 2022 Russian Junior Grand Prix series, coming in seventh place in Samara and tenth place in Kazan.

After deciding he wanted to compete for Germany, Gartung and his father reached out to German figure skating coach Niko Ulanovsky in 2023 to start the process. The Figure Skating Federation of Russia officially released Gartung in 2024, and he became a member of the German Ice Skating Union in July of that year.

=== 2024–2025 season ===
Gartung's first competition representing Germany was the 2024 Junior Grand Prix in Latvia in August, where he came in sixth place. At the 2024 Junior Grand Prix in Slovenia in October, he placed third, earning his first medal for Germany. In December, he earned the men's junior gold medal at the 2025 German Championships. Gartung ended the season in February at the 2025 World Junior Championships, where he placed seventh.

=== 2025–2026 season ===
Gartung's season began in August at the 2025 Junior Grand Prix in Latvia, where he earned a bronze medal.

In September, he competed in his first senior event, Skate to Milano, a qualifying event held in Beijing for the 2026 Winter Olympics in Milan. He finished in ninth place and failed to secure a men's figure skating spot for Germany at the Olympics. Not yet a German citizen, Gartung would have been unable to compete at the Olympics, even if he had earned a spot.

In October, he earned his second bronze medal of the season at the in 2025 Junior Grand Prix in Poland. In November, he competed at the senior level at the 2025 Warsaw Cup and the 2025 Tallinn Trophy, coming in fourth place and sixth place, respectively. In December, he competed at the 2026 German Championships, where he won the men's senior gold medal.

Gartung came in 22nd place at the 2026 European Championships in January. In March, he competed in both the 2026 World Junior Championships and the 2026 World Championships, coming in 11th place and 24th place, respectively.

=== 2026–2027 season ===
Gartung began his season in September at the 2026 Nebelhorn Trophy, where he placed second, marking his first medal from an ISU Challenger Series event. In October, he set a new personal best score of 238.45 at the 2026 Budapest Trophy, where he placed second in the short program, finishing fourth overall.

Gartung made his senior Grand Prix debut in October at the 2026 Skate Canada International, where he placed eighth.

== Programs ==
Competition programs by season
Season	Short program	Free skate program
2024-25	"Amber": Performed by The Gardener & the Tree; Choreo. by Joti Polizoakis	Medley: 1. "It's a Man's Man's Man's World"; Performed by Seal; 2. "This Is A Man's World"; Performed by David Gogo; 3. "I Got You (I Feel Good)"; Performed by James Brown; Choreo. by Egor Murashov
2025-26	"Did You Ever Feel Lonely?": Performed by Gary Moore; Choreo. by Joti Polizoakis	Medley: 1. "Brick & Blood"; Performed by The Newton Brothers; 2. Daredevil: Born Again (Main Theme); Performed by The Newton Brothers; 3. "Judge Jury Executioner"; Performed by Power Haus and Berlin Aires; Choreo. by Benoît Richaud
2026-27	Pulp Fiction: 1. "Lonesome Town"; Performed by Ricky Nelson, Baker Knight; 2. "Bullwinkle Part II"; Performed by The Centurians; 3. "You Never Can Tell"; Performed by Chuck Berry; Choreo. by Nikolai Morozov	Medley: 1. "Enjoy the Silence" (various mixes); Performed by Depeche Mode; 2. "Bayt Lahm"; Performed by Ryan Taubert; 3. "We Wish It Was Never Light"; Performed by Ryan Taubert; Choreo. by Joti Polizoakis

== Competitive highlights ==
- GP – Event of the ISU Grand Prix Series
- JGP – Event of the ISU Junior Grand Prix Series
- CS – Event of the ISU Challenger Series
- TBD – Assigned
- WD – Withdrew from competition

Competition placements at senior level
Season	2025-26	2026-27
World Championships	24th	
European Championships	22nd	
German Championships	1st	
GP Finland		TBD
GP Skate Canada		8th
CS Nebelhorn Trophy		2nd
CS Tallinn Trophy	6th	
CS Warsaw Cup	4th	
CS Budapest Trophy		4th
Skate to Milano	9th	
Diamond Spin	2nd	

Competition placements at junior level
Season	2024-25	2025-26
World Junior Championships	7th	11th
German Championships (Junior)	1st	
JGP Latvia	6th	3rd
JGP Poland		3rd
JGP Slovenia	3rd	
Bavarian Open	2nd	
Merano Ice Trophy	1st	
NRW Trophy	2nd	
Skate Berlin		1st

== Detailed Results ==
ISU personal best scores in the +5/-5 GOE System
Segment	Type	Score	Event
Total	TSS	238.45	2026 CS Budapest Trophy
Short program	TSS	83.59	2026 CS Budapest Trophy
Short program	TES	48.76	2026 CS Nebelhorn Trophy
Short program	PCS	35.60	2026 Skate Canada International
Free skating	TSS	154.86	2026 CS Budapest Trophy
Free skating	TES	83.59	2026 CS Budapest Trophy
Free skating	PCS	72.10	2026 CS Nebelhorn Trophy

=== Senior level ===
Results in the 2025-26 season
Date	Event	SP		FS		Total	
Date	Event	P	Score	P	Score	P	Score
17-21 Sep, 2025	(China) 2025 Skate to Milano	9	69.51	7	141.66	9	211.17
16-19 Oct, 2025	(Poland) 2025 Diamond Spin	5	52.31	1	140.97	2	193.28
19-23 Nov, 2025	(Poland) 2025 CS Warsaw Cup	8	66.15	4	137.30	4	203.45
25-30 Nov, 2025	(Estonia) 2025 CS Tallinn Trophy	6	75.08	7	141.57	6	216.65
8-13 Dec, 2025	(Germany) 2026 German Championships	3	65.29	1	164.09	1	229.38
13-18 Jan, 2026	(United Kingdom) 2026 European Championships	24	64.45	20	124.87	22	189.32
24-29 Mar, 2026	(Czech Republic) 2026 World Championships	23	73.20	24	119.11	24	192.31

Results in the 2026-27 season
Date	Event	SP		FS		Total	
Date	Event	P	Score	P	Score	P	Score
24-26 Sep, 2026	(Germany) 2026 CS Nebelhorn Trophy	5	79.05	2	152.34	2	231.39
15-18 Oct, 2026	(Hungary) 2026 CS Budapest Trophy	2	83.59	5	154.86	4	238.45
30 Oct - 1 Nov, 2026	2026 Skate Canada International	11	67.44	5	149.03	8	216.47

=== Junior level ===
Results in the 2024-25 season
Date	Event	SP		FS		Total	
Date	Event	P	Score	P	Score	P	Score
28-31 Aug, 2024	2024 JGP Latvia	10	54.56	4	136.86	6	191.42
2-5 Oct, 2024	2024 JGP Slovenia	6	68.91	2	139.86	3	208.77
12-17 Nov, 2024	(Germany) 2024 NRW Trophy	3	58.52	2	127.64	2	186.16
16-21 Dec, 2024	(Germany) 2025 German Championships (Junior)	1	64.59	1	142.48	1	207.07
20-26 Jan, 2025	(Germany) 2025 Bavarian Open	2	75.33	2	135.04	2	210.37
13-16 Feb, 2025	(Italy) 2025 Merano Ice Trophy	1	76.20	1	120.74	1	196.94
24 Feb-2 Mar, 2025	(Hungary) 2025 World Junior Championships	8	74.37	7	144.57	7	218.94

Results in the 2025-26 season
Date	Event	SP		FS		Total	
Date	Event	P	Score	P	Score	P	Score
20-23 Aug, 2025	2025 JGP Latvia	4	75.94	3	134.07	3	210.01
1-4 Oct, 2025	2025 JGP Poland	4	72.69	2	146.45	3	219.14
18-22 Feb, 2026	(Germany) 2026 Skate Berlin International	3	59.77	1	132.44	1	192.91
3-8 Mar, 2026	(Estonia) 2026 World Junior Championships	17	63.67	6	146.01	11	209.68
