= Hiro Kaewtathip =

Thai figure skater (born 2010)

Personal information
- Native name: ฮิโระ แก้วตาทิพย์
- Born: November 9, 2010 (age 16) Bangkok, Thailand
- Height: 1.73 m (5 ft 8 in)

Figure skating career
- Country: Thailand
- Coach: Amy Evidente; Derrick Delmore; Jonathan Cassar
- Skating club: LA Elite Ice
- Began skating: 2014

Medal record
Thai Championships
Gold medal – first place	2026 Bangkok	Singles

Hiro Kaewtathip (Thai: ฮิโระ แก้วตาทิพย์; born 9 November 2010) is a Thai figure skater. He is the 2026 Thai national champion.

On the junior level, he is the 2026 JGP Slovenia champion, the 2026 JGP Thailand champion and a two-time Asian Open Figure Skating Trophy champion (2025, 2026).

== Career ==
=== 2025–2026: Junior Grand Prix debut ===
In August 2025, he became the first Thai skater to achieve a gold medal in the Asian Open Figure Skating Trophy – Junior class. A month later, he achieved a historic fifth-place finish in JGP Thailand. Kaewtathip also came second in the 2026 Bavarian Open.

=== 2026–2027: First Thai JGP Medal ===
He successfully defended his gold medal in the Asian Open Figure Skating Trophy – Junior, held in August 2026. A month later, he became the first Thai Junior Grand Prix medalist after getting bronze in his home JGP at JGP Thailand. On September 2nd Kaewtathip won gold at JGP Ljubljana and became the first Thai Junior Grand Prix Winner. He also qualified for the 2026–27 Junior Grand Prix Final.

== Personal life ==
Kaewtathip began skating at the age of four and moved to the United States to live with his aunt at the age of thirteen to pursue figure skating.

== Programs ==
Competition programs by season
Season	Short program	Free skate program
2024-25	Romeo & Juliet by Abel Korzeniowski	Scheherazade by Nikolai Rimsky-Korsakov
2025-26	The Four Seasons by Vivaldi, recomposed by Max Richter	"A Beautiful Storm" by Jennifer Thomas
2026-27	"Saturn" by Sleeping at Last	"The Storm" by Balázs Havasi

== Competitive highlights ==
- JGP – Event of the ISU Junior Grand Prix Series
- TBD – Assigned
- WD – Withdrew from competition

Competition placements at senior level
Season	2025–26
Thai Championships	1st

Competition placements at junior level
Season	2024–25	2025–26	2026–27
World Junior Championships		17th	
JGP Final			TBD
JGP Thailand		5th	3rd
JGP Slovenia			1st
JGP United Arab Emirates		11th	
Santa Claus Cup	5th		
Cranberry Cup	17th		
Asian Open Trophy		1st	1st
Bavarian Open		2nd	
