= ISU Junior Grand Prix in Azerbaijan =

International figure skating competition

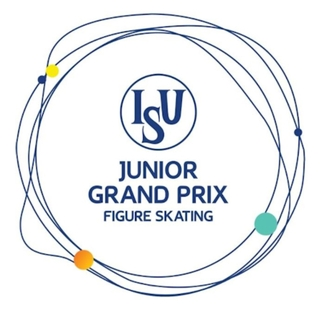
- Status: Active
- Genre: ISU Junior Grand Prix
- Frequency: Occasional
- Venue: Heydar Aliyev Sports and Concert Complex
- Location: Baku
- Country: Azerbaijan
- Inaugurated: 2025
- Organizer: Azerbaijan Winter Sports Federation

The ISU Junior Grand Prix in Azerbaijan is an international figure skating competition sanctioned by the International Skating Union (ISU), organized and hosted by the Azerbaijan Winter Sports Federation (Azerbaijani: Azərbaycan Qış İdman Növləri Federasiyası). It is held periodically as an event of the ISU Junior Grand Prix of Figure Skating (JGP), a series of international competitions exclusively for junior-level skaters. Medals may be awarded in men's singles, women's singles, pair skating, and ice dance. Skaters earn points based on their results at the qualifying competitions each season, and the top skaters or teams in each discipline are invited to then compete at the Junior Grand Prix of Figure Skating Final.

== History ==
The ISU Junior Grand Prix of Figure Skating (JGP) was established by the International Skating Union (ISU) in 1997 and consists of a series of seven international figure skating competitions exclusively for junior-level skaters. The locations of the JGP events change every year. While all seven competitions feature the men's, women's, and ice dance events, only four competitions each season feature the pairs event. Skaters earn points based on their results each season, and the top skaters or teams in each discipline are then invited to compete at the Junior Grand Prix of Figure Skating Final.

Skaters are eligible to compete on the junior-level circuit if they are at least 13 years old before 1 July of the respective season, but not yet 19 (for single skaters), 21 (for men and women in ice dance and women in pair skating), or 23 (for men in pair skating). Competitors are chosen by their respective skating federations. The number of entries allotted to each ISU member nation in each discipline is determined by their results at the prior World Junior Figure Skating Championships.

Azerbaijan hosted its first Junior Grand Prix competition in 2025 at the Heydar Aliyev Sports and Concert Complex in Baku. Fuad Naghiyev, President of the Azerbaijan Winter Sports Federation, spoke about the increased number of participants in figure skating in Azerbaijan when he spoke to the audience at the event's opening ceremony. Seo Min-kyu and Kim Yu-seong, both of South Korea, won the men's and women's events, respectively, while Ambre Perrier Gianesini and Samuel Blanc Klaperman of France won the ice dance event.

== Medalists ==
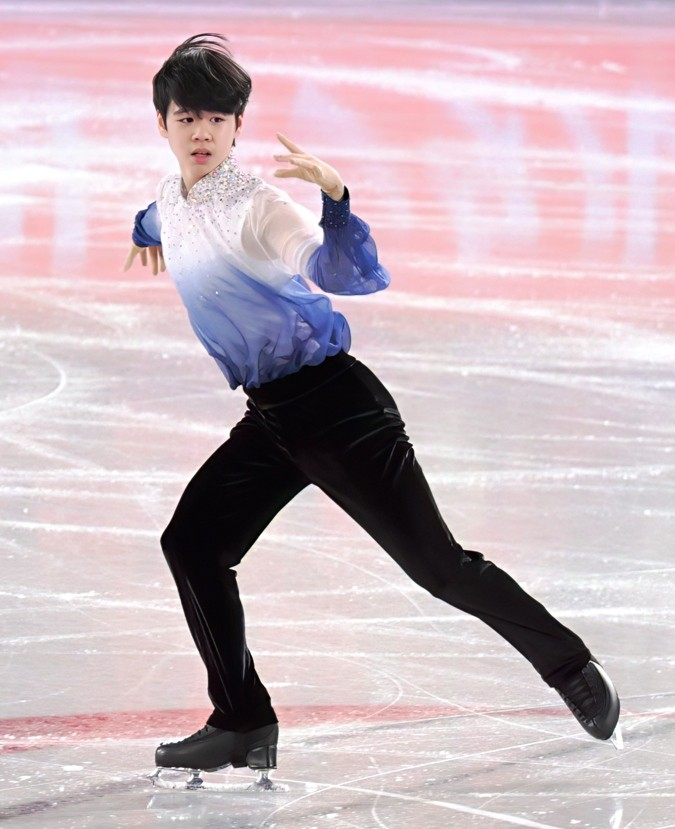
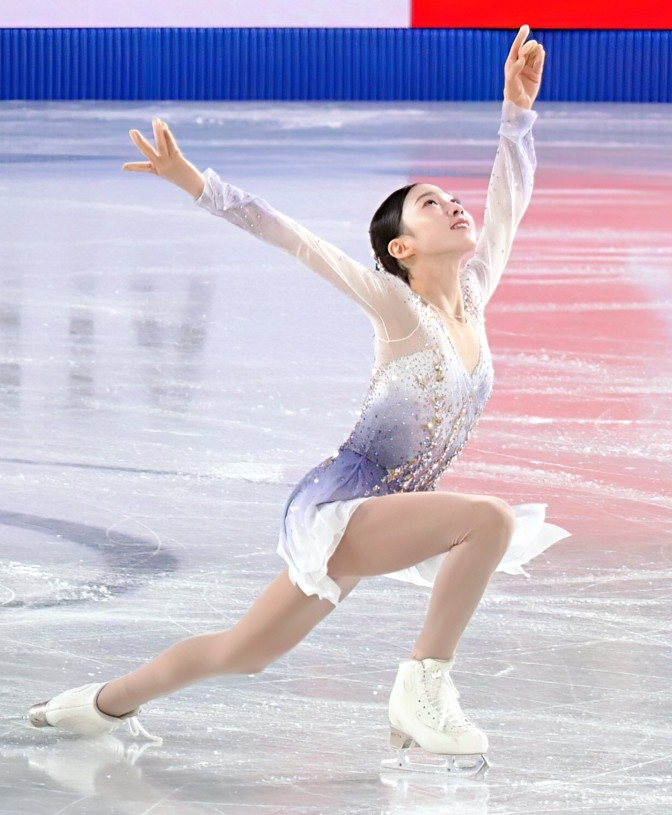
The inaugural Junior Grand Prix in Azerbaijan champions: Seo Min-kyu of South Korea (men's singles) and Kim Yu-seong of South Korea (women's singles).
Not pictured: Ambre Perrier Gianesini and Samuel Blanc Klaperman of France (ice dance)

=== Men's singles ===
Men's event medalists
Year	Location	Gold	Silver	Bronze	Ref.
2025	Baku	(South Korea) Seo Min-kyu	(Belgium) Denis Krouglov	(United States) Caleb Farrington	

=== Women's singles ===
Women's event medalists
Year	Location	Gold	Silver	Bronze	Ref.
2025	Baku	(South Korea) Kim Yu-seong	(Japan) Mayuko Oka	(Israel) Sophia Shifrin	

=== Ice dance ===
Ice dance event medalists
Year	Location	Gold	Silver	Bronze	Ref.
2025	Baku	(France); Ambre Perrier Gianesini; Samuel Blanc Klaperman	(Italy); Zoe Bianchi; Daniel Basile	(Canada); Summer Homick; Nicholas Buelow	
