= 2026–27 Grand Prix of Figure Skating Final =

International figure skating competition

2026–27 Grand Prix Final
- Type: Grand Prix
- Date: 10 – 12 December
- Season: 2026–27
- Location: Chongqing, China
- Previous: 2025–26 Grand Prix Final
- Next: 2027–28 Grand Prix Final
- Previous Grand Prix: 2026 NHK Trophy

The 2026–27 Grand Prix of Figure Skating Final is a figure skating competition sanctioned by the International Skating Union (ISU). It will be the culminating event of the 2026–27 Grand Prix of Figure Skating series, and will be held from 10 to 12 December in Chongqing, China. Medals will be awarded in men's singles, women's singles, pair skating, and ice dance. Skaters earned points based on their results at qualifying competitions during the season, and the top six skaters or teams in each discipline were then invited to compete at the Grand Prix Final. Skaters can earn points towards the World Standings and Season's World Ranking based on their results.

The competition will be held concurrently with the 2026–27 Junior Grand Prix of Figure Skating Final, the culminating event of the 2026–27 Junior Grand Prix series.

== Background ==
The ISU Grand Prix of Figure Skating is a series of seven events sanctioned by the International Skating Union (ISU) and held during the autumn: six qualifying events and the Grand Prix of Figure Skating Final. This allows skaters to perfect their programs earlier in the season, as well as compete against the skaters whom they would later encounter at the World Championships. Skaters earn points based on their results in their respective competitions and the top skaters or teams in each discipline are invited to compete at the Grand Prix Final.

2026–27 Grand Prix competitions
Date	Event	Location	Ref.
23–25 October	2026 Grand Prix de France	Angers, France	
30 October – 1 November	2026 Skate Canada International	Kelowna, British Columbia, Canada	
6–8 November	2026 Cup of China	Shenzhen, China	
13–15 November	(United States) 2026 Skate America	Everett, Washington, United States	
20–22 November	(Finland) 2026 Finlandia Trophy	Helsinki, Finland	
27–29 November	(Japan) 2026 NHK Trophy	Tokyo, Japan	

The ISU Junior Grand Prix of Figure Skating (JGP) was established by the ISU in 1997 and consists of a series of seven international competitions exclusively for junior-level skaters. While all seven competitions feature the men's, women's, and ice dance events, only four competitions each season feature the pairs event.

Date	Event	Location	Notes	Ref.
20–22 August	(China) 2026 JGP Xi'an	Xi'an, China		
27–29 August	(Latvia) 2026 JGP Riga	Riga, Latvia		
3–5 September	(Thailand) 2026 JGP Bangkok	Bangkok, Thailand	No pairs	
17–19 September	(Turkey) 2026 JGP Ankara	Ankara, Turkey		
24–26 September	(Georgia (country)) 2026 JGP Batumi	Batumi, Georgia	No pairs	
1–3 October	(Slovenia) 2026 JGP Ljubljana	Ljubljana, Slovenia	No pairs	
8–10 October	(Poland) 2026 JGP Gdańsk	Gdańsk, Poland		

The 2026–27 Grand Prix and Junior Grand Prix Finals will be held from 10 to 13 December in Chongqing, China.

== Qualifiers ==
The top six skaters or teams in each discipline were determined based on the results of the six qualifying Grand Prix competitions.

=== Senior qualifiers and alternates ===
Grand Prix Final qualifiers
No.	Men	Women	Pairs	Ice dance
1	(Japan); Kao Miura	(Japan) Ami Nakai	(Georgia (country)); Anastasiia Metelkina; Luka Berulava	(United Kingdom); Lilah Fear; Lewis Gibson
2	(Estonia); Mihhail Selevko	(Japan); Mao Shimada	(Canada); Lia Pereira; Trennt Michaud	(France); Laurence Fournier Beaudry; Guillaume Cizeron
3	TBD	(Estonia); Niina Petrõkina	(Germany); Annika Hocke; Robert Kunkel	(France); Evgeniia Lopareva; Geoffrey Brissaud
4	TBD	(Individual Neutral Athletes); Alexandra Ignatova	(United States); Alisa Efimova; Misha Mitrofanov	TBD
5	TBD	TBD	TBD	TBD
6	TBD	TBD	TBD	TBD

Grand Prix Final alternates
No.	Men	Women	Pairs	Ice dance
1	TBD	TBD	TBD	TBD
2	TBD	TBD	TBD	TBD
3	TBD	TBD	TBD	TBD

=== Junior qualifiers and alternates ===
The top six skaters or teams in each discipline were determined based on the results of the seven qualifying Junior Grand Prix competitions.

Junior Grand Prix Final qualifiers
No.	Men	Women	Pairs	Ice dance
1	(Individual Neutral Athletes); Lev Lazarev	(Individual Neutral Athletes); Sofiia Dzepka	(Individual Neutral Athletes); Polina Shesheleva; Egor Karnaukhov	(Individual Neutral Athletes); Mariia Fefelova; Artem Valov
2	(Thailand); Hiro Kaewtathip	(Australia); Hana Bath	(China); Chen Yuxuan; Dong Yinbo	(Germany); Darya Grimm; Grigorii Rodin
3	(Switzerland); Ean Weiler	(Japan); Mei Okada	(Spain); Anita Mapelli; Noah Quesada Grau	(France); Ambre Perrier Gianesini; Samuel Blanc Klaperman
4	(South Korea); Choi Ha-bin	(Japan); Sumika Kanazawa	(United States); Reagan Moss; Jakub Galbavy	(France); Dania Mouaden; Théo Bigot
5	(Japan); Daiya Ebihara	(China); Wang Yihan	(Czech Republic); Debora Anna Cohen; Lukas Vochozka	(United States); Hana Maria Aboian; Daniil Veselukhin
6	(New Zealand); Yanhao Li	(China); Liu Yuxuan	(United States); Sofia Jarmoc; Luke Witkowski	(Italy); Zoe Bianchi; Daniel Basile

Junior Grand Prix Final alternates
No.	Men	Women	Pairs	Ice dance
1	(South Korea); Lee Jae-keun	(Canada); Lia Cho	(Individual Neutral Athletes); Taisiia Guseva; Daniil Ovchinnikov	(Italy); Arianna Soldati; Nicholas Tagliabue
2	(Belgium); Denis Krouglov	(China); Shuxian Jin	(Georgia (country)); Zlata Kamalova; Danil Panov	(United States); Aneta Václavíková; William Lissauer
3	(Ukraine); Yehor Kurtsev	(France); Stefania Gladki	(Canada); Marykim Ranzi; Enryck Legault	(United States); Xinyu Chen; Gordei Chitipakhovian

== Required performance elements ==
=== Single skating ===
Men and women competing in single skating first performed a short program. Lasting 2 minutes 40 seconds (+/− 10 seconds), the short program had to include the following elements:

For junior men: one double or triple Axel; one double or triple lutz; one jump combination consisting of a double jump and a triple jump or two triple jumps; one sit spin with a change of foot and no flying entry; one camel spin with a flying entry; one spin combination with a change of foot and no flying entry; and a step sequence using the full ice surface.

For senior men: one double or triple Axel; one triple or quadruple jump; one jump combination consisting of a double jump and a triple jump, two triple jumps, or a quadruple jump and a double jump or triple jump; one flying spin; one camel spin or sit spin with a change of foot and no flying entry; one spin combination with a change of foot and no flying entry; and a step sequence using the full ice surface.

For junior women: one double Axel; one double or triple lutz; one jump combination consisting of two double jumps, one double jump and one triple jump, or two triple jumps; one flying camel spin; one layback spin, sideways leaning spin, or sit spin without a change of foot and no flying entry; one spin combination with a change of foot and no flying entry; and one step sequence using the full ice surface.

For senior women: one double or triple Axel; one triple jump; one jump combination consisting of a double jump and a triple jump, or two triple jumps; one flying spin; one layback spin, sideways leaning spin, camel spin, or sit spin without a change of foot and no flying entry; one spin combination with a change of foot and no flying entry; and one step sequence using the full ice surface.

Men and women then perform their free skates. Lasting 3 minutes 30 seconds (+/− 10 seconds) for junior skaters, or 4 minutes (+/− 10 seconds) for senior skaters, the free skate had to include the following:

For junior men and women: six jump elements, of which one had to be an Axel-type jump; three spins, of which one had to be a spin combination, one a flying spin, and one a choreographic spin; and a choreographic sequence.

For senior men and women: six jump elements, of which one had to be an Axel-type jump; three spins, of which one had to be a spin combination, one a flying spin, and one a choreographic spin; a step sequence; and a choreographic sequence.

=== Pairs ===
Lasting 2 minutes 40 seconds (+/− 10 seconds), the short program had to include the following elements:

For junior couples: one group 3 pair lift, one double or triple twist lift, one double or triple loop throw jump, one double lutz or double Axel solo jump, one Pair spin combination, one forward inside death spiral, and a step sequence using the full ice surface.

For senior couples: one group 3 pair lift, one double or triple twist lift, one double or triple throw jump, one double or triple solo jump, one pair spin combination, one forward inside death spiral, and a step sequence using the full ice surface.

Lasting 3 minutes 30 seconds (+/− 10 seconds) for junior couples, or 4 minutes (+/− 10 seconds) for senior couples, the free skate had to include the following:

For junior couples: two pair lifts not both from the same group with full extension of the lifting arm/s, one twist lift, two different throw jumps, one solo jump, one jump combination or sequence of a maximum of 2 jumps, one choreographic pair spin, one death spiral.

For senior couples: two pair lifts not both from the same group with full extension of the lifting arm/s, one choreographic pair lift, one twist lift, two different throw jumps, one solo jump, one jump combination or sequence of a maximum of 2 jumps, one choreographic pair spin, one death spiral different from the death spiral of the short program.

=== Ice dance ===
Lasting no more than 2 minutes 50 seconds, the theme of the rhythm dance this season is "Rhythm and Waltz".

For junior couples: one sequence with 2 sections of the Westminster Waltz, one dance lift, one set of sequential twizzles, and one step sequence while not touching.

For senior couples: one section of the Golden Waltz, one creative dance element, one dance lift, one set of sequential twizzles, and one step sequence while not touching.

Lasting 3 minutes 30 seconds (+/− 10 seconds) for juniors, or 4 minutes (+/− 10 seconds) for seniors, the free dance had to include the following:

For junior couples: two different types of dance lifts or one combination lift; one dance spin; one set of synchronized twizzles; one step sequence in hold, one step sequence while on one skate and not in hold; and two choreographic elements.

For senior couples: three different types of dance lifts or one short lift and one combination lift; one dance spin; one set of synchronized twizzles; one step sequence in hold; one step sequence while on one skate and with contact/hold, and two choreographic elements.

== Judging ==
Skaters are judged according to the required technical elements of their program (such as jumps and spins), as well as the overall presentation of their program, based on three program components (skating skills, presentation, and composition). Each technical element in a figure skating performance is assigned a predetermined base point value and scored by a panel of nine judges on a scale from −5 to +5 based on the quality of its execution. Each Grade of Execution (GOE) from –5 to +5 is assigned a value as indicated on the Scale of Values. For example, a triple Axel is worth a base value of 8.00 points, and a GOE of +3 is worth 2.40 points, so a triple Axel with a GOE of +3 earns 10.40 points. The judging panel's GOE for each element is determined by calculating the trimmed mean (the average after discarding the highest and lowest scores). The panel's scores for all elements are added together to generate a Total Elements Score. At the same time, the judges evaluate each performance based on the five aforementioned program components and assign each a score from 0.25 to 10 in 0.25-point increments. The judging panel's final score for each program component is also determined by calculating the trimmed mean. Those scores are then multiplied by the factor shown on the chart below; the results are added together to generate a total Program Component Score.

Program component factoring
Discipline	Short program or rhythm dance	Free skate or free dance
Men	1.67	3.33
Women	1.33	2.67
Pairs	1.33	2.67
Ice dance	1.33	2.00

Deductions are applied for certain violations, such as time infractions, stops and restarts, or falls. The Total Elements Score and Program Component Score are then added together, minus any deductions, to generate a final performance score for each skater or team.

== Works cited ==
"Sports Rules – Single & Pair Skating and Ice Dance" (PDF). International Skating Union. Archived (PDF) from the original on 24 May 2026.
