= 2026–27 ISU Junior Grand Prix =

Figure skating competition series

- Type: ISU Junior Grand Prix
- Date: August 20 – December 13, 2026
- Season: 2026–27
- Previous: 2025–26 ISU Junior Grand Prix
- Next: 2027–28 ISU Junior Grand Prix

The 2026–27 ISU Junior Grand Prix is a series of junior international competitions organized by the International Skating Union that will be held from August 2026 through December 2026. It is the junior-level complement to the 2026–27 ISU Grand Prix of Figure Skating. Medals will be awarded in men's singles, women's singles, pair skating, and ice dance. Skaters will earn points based on their placement at each event, and the top six in each discipline will qualify to compete at the 2026–27 Junior Grand Prix Final in Chongqing, China.

== Competitions ==
The ISU Junior Grand Prix of Figure Skating (JGP) was established by the International Skating Union (ISU) in 1997 and consists of a series of seven international figure skating competitions exclusively for junior-level skaters. The locations of the Junior Grand Prix events change every year. While all seven competitions feature the men's, women's, and ice dance events, only four competitions each season feature the pairs event. This season, the series will include the following events.

| Date | Event | Location | Notes | Ref. |
|---|---|---|---|---|
| August 20–22 | (China) 2026 JGP Xi'an | Xi'an, China | | |
| August 27–29 | (Latvia) 2026 JGP Riga | Riga, Latvia | | |
| September 3–5 | (Thailand) 2026 JGP Bangkok | Bangkok, Thailand | No pairs | |
| September 17–19 | (Turkey) 2026 JGP Ankara | Ankara, Turkey | | |
| September 24–26 | (Georgia (country)) 2026 JGP Batumi | Batumi, Georgia | No pairs | |
| October 1–3 | (Slovenia) 2026 JGP Ljubljana | Ljubljana, Slovenia | No pairs | |
| October 8–10 | (Poland) 2026 JGP Gdańsk | Gdańsk, Poland | | |
| December 10–13 | (China) 2026–27 Junior Grand Prix Final | Chongqing, China | | |

== Entries ==
Skaters are eligible to compete on the junior-level circuit if they are at least 13 years old before July 1 of the respective season, and if they have not yet turned 19 (for single skaters, and females in ice dance and pair skating) or 21 (for males in ice dance and pair skating). Competitors are chosen by their respective skating federations. The number of entries allotted to each ISU member nation in each discipline is determined by their results at the prior 2026 World Junior Figure Skating Championships.

Singles and ice dance
| Entries | Men | Women | Ice dance |
|---|---|---|---|
| Two entries in seven events | Japan; South Korea; United States | Australia; Israel; Japan | France; Ukraine; United States |
| One entry in seven events | Belgium; Germany; New Zealand | China; Georgia; South Korea | Canada; Italy; Germany |
| One entry in six events | Canada; Switzerland; Chinese Taipei; Ukraine | Switzerland; United States; Estonia; Slovakia | Czech Republic; Austria; Switzerland; Japan |
| One entry in five events | Israel; Thailand; Finland; Hong Kong; China; Georgia; Poland; Sweden | France; Germany; Czech Republic; Italy; Netherlands; Finland; Hong Kong; Hungary | Great Britain; China; Hong Kong; Spain |
| One entry in four events | Italy; Lithuania; Latvia; Slovenia; Austria; Great Britain | Austria; Lithuania; Great Britain; Canada; Turkey; Spain | Estonia; Finland; Poland; Sweden |
| One entry in three events | Estonia; Armenia; Norway; Slovakia; Czech Republic; Spain; Kazakhstan; Bulgaria; Turkey; Estonia; France; Hungary; Australia | Latvia; Belgium; Chinese Taipei; Kyrgyzstan; Ukraine; Norway; Cyprus; New Zealand; Slovenia; Bulgaria; Sweden; Armenia; Kazakhstan; Poland; Thailand; Croatia; Denmark | Hungary; Israel; Azerbaijan; Slovakia; Bulgaria |

- If not listed above, one entry in two events is allowed.
- Host federations may enter up to three spots per discipline.

Pairs
| Entries | Pairs |
|---|---|
| Three entries in four events | Canada; China; Ukraine; United States |
| Two entries in four events | France; Italy; Spain; Slovakia; Great Britain; Switzerland |
| One entry in four events | Hungary; Czech Republic |

- If not listed above, one entry in three events is allowed.
- Host federations have an unlimited number of entries.

== Medal summary ==
=== Men's singles ===
Men's medalists
| Competition | Gold | Silver | Bronze | Ref. |
|---|---|---|---|---|
| (China) JGP Xi'an | (Individual Neutral Athletes); Lev Lazarev | (New Zealand); Yanhao Li | (Japan); Daiya Ebihara | |
| (Latvia) JGP Riga | (South Korea); Choi Ha-bin | (South Korea); Lee Jae-keun | (Switzerland); Ean Weiler | |
| (Thailand) JGP Bangkok | (Individual Neutral Athletes); Lev Lazarev | (New Zealand); Yanhao Li | (Thailand); Hiro Kaewtathip | |
| (Turkey) JGP Ankara | (Japan); Daiya Ebihara | (Ukraine); Yehor Kurtsev | (South Korea); Choi Ha-bin | |
| (Georgia (country)) JGP Batumi | (Switzerland); Ean Weiler | (Japan); Hayato Okazaki | (Japan); Sena Takahashi | |
| (Slovenia) JGP Ljubljana | (Thailand); Hiro Kaewtathip | (South Korea); Lee Jae-keun | (Japan); Taiga Nishino | |
| (Poland) JGP Gdańsk | (Belgium); Denis Krouglov | (Latvia); Jānis Znotiņš | (Ukraine); Yehor Kurtsev | |
| (China) Junior Grand Prix Final | | | | |

=== Women's singles ===
Women's medalists
| Competition | Gold | Silver | Bronze | Ref. |
|---|---|---|---|---|
| (China) JGP Xi'an | (Individual Neutral Athletes); Sofiia Dzepka | (China); Liu Yuxuan | (China); Jin Shuxian | |
| (Latvia) JGP Riga | (Australia); Hana Bath | (Japan); Mei Okada | (China); Wang Yihan | |
| (Thailand) JGP Bangkok | (Individual Neutral Athletes); Sofiia Dzepka | (Japan); Sumika Kanazawa | (Canada); Lia Cho | |
| (Turkey) JGP Ankara | (Japan); Mei Okada | (China); Jin Shuxian | (France); Stefania Gladki | |
| (Georgia (country)) JGP Batumi | (China); Wang Yihan | (Israel) Sophia Shifrin | (France); Stefania Gladki | |
| (Slovenia) JGP Ljubljana | (Australia); Hana Bath | (China); Liu Yuxuan | (Switzerland); Leandra Tzimpoukakis | |
| (Poland) JGP Gdańsk | (Japan); Sumika Kanazawa | (Canada); Lia Cho | (Switzerland); Elisabeth Dibbern | |
| (China) Junior Grand Prix Final | | | | |

=== Pairs ===
Pairs medalists
| Competition | Gold | Silver | Bronze | Ref. |
|---|---|---|---|---|
| (China) JGP Xi'an | (Individual Neutral Athletes); Polina Shesheleva; Egor Karnaukhov | (China); Chen Yuxuan; Dong Yinbo | (China); Wang Chen Ling; Chen Yong Zheng | |
| (Latvia) JGP Riga | (China); Chen Yuxuan; Dong Yinbo | (United States); Reagan Moss; Jakub Galbavy | (Czech Republic); Debora Anna Cohen; Lukas Vochozka | |
| (Turkey) JGP Ankara | (Individual Neutral Athletes); Taisiia Guseva; Daniil Ovchinnikov | (Individual Neutral Athletes); Polina Shesheleva; Egor Karnaukhov | (Spain); Anita Mapelli; Noah Quesada Grau | |
| (Poland) JGP Gdańsk | (Spain); Anita Mapelli; Noah Quesada Grau | (Georgia (country)); Zlata Kamalova; Danil Panov | (China); Guo Rui; Zhang Yiwen | |
| (China) Junior Grand Prix Final | | | | |

=== Ice dance ===
Ice dance medalists
| Competition | Gold | Silver | Bronze | Ref. |
|---|---|---|---|---|
| (China) JGP Xi'an | (Individual Neutral Athletes); Mariia Fefelova; Artem Valov | (Italy); Zoe Bianchi; Daniel Basile | (Canada); Summer Homick; Nicholas Buelow | |
| (Latvia) JGP Riga | (France); Dania Mouaden; Théo Bigot | (United States); Aneta Václavíková; William Lissauer | (Germany); Eniko Kobor; Zoard Kobor | |
| (Thailand) JGP Bangkok | (Individual Neutral Athletes); Mariia Fefelova; Artem Valov | (Italy); Zoe Bianchi; Daniel Basile | (France); Lea Hienne; Louis Varescon | |
| (Turkey) JGP Ankara | (United States); Hana Maria Aboian; Daniil Veselukhin | (France); Dania Mouaden; Théo Bigot | (United States); Xinyu Chen; Gordei Chitipakhovian | |
| (Georgia (country)) JGP Batumi | (France); Ambre Perrier Gianesini; Samuel Blanc Klaperman | (Germany); Darya Grimm; Grigorii Rodin | (United States); Xinyu Chen; Gordei Chitipakhovian | |
| (Slovenia) JGP Ljubljana | (Germany); Darya Grimm; Grigorii Rodin | (France); Ambre Perrier Gianesini; Samuel Blanc Klaperman | (United States); Aneta Václavíková; William Lissauer | |
| (Poland) JGP Gdańsk | (Italy); Arianna Soldati; Nicholas Tagliabue | (United States); Hana Maria Aboian; Daniil Veselukhin | (Italy); Melissa Cachova; Ivan Morozov | |
| (China) Junior Grand Prix Final | | | | |

=== Medal table ===
| Rank | Nation | Gold | Silver | Bronze | Total |
|---|---|---|---|---|---|
| 1 | Individual Neutral Athletes | 8 | 1 | 0 | 9 |
| 2 | Japan | 3 | 3 | 3 | 9 |
| 3 | China | 2 | 4 | 4 | 10 |
| 4 | France | 2 | 2 | 3 | 7 |
| 5 | Australia | 2 | 0 | 0 | 2 |
| 6 | United States | 1 | 3 | 3 | 7 |
| 7 | Italy | 1 | 2 | 1 | 4 |
| 7 | South Korea | 1 | 2 | 1 | 4 |
| 9 | Germany | 1 | 1 | 1 | 3 |
| 10 | Switzerland | 1 | 0 | 3 | 4 |
| 11 | Spain | 1 | 0 | 1 | 2 |
| 11 | Thailand | 1 | 0 | 1 | 2 |
| 13 | Belgium | 1 | 0 | 0 | 1 |
| 14 | New Zealand | 0 | 2 | 0 | 2 |
| 15 | Canada | 0 | 1 | 2 | 3 |
| 16 | Ukraine | 0 | 1 | 1 | 2 |
| 17 | Georgia | 0 | 1 | 0 | 1 |
| 17 | Israel | 0 | 1 | 0 | 1 |
| 17 | Latvia | 0 | 1 | 0 | 1 |
| 20 | Czech Republic | 0 | 0 | 1 | 1 |
| Totals (20 entries) | | 25 | 25 | 25 | 75 |

== Qualification ==
At each event, skaters earn points toward qualification for the Junior Grand Prix Final. Following the seventh event, the top six highest-scoring skaters/teams advance to the Final. The points earned per placement are as follows:

| Placement | Singles | Pairs/Ice dance |
|---|---|---|
| 1st | 15 | 15 |
| 2nd | 13 | 13 |
| 3rd | 11 | 11 |
| 4th | 9 | 9 |
| 5th | 7 | 7 |
| 6th | 5 | 5 |
| 7th | 4 | 4 |
| 8th | 3 | 3 |
| 9th | 2 | —N/a |
| 10th | 1 | —N/a |

There are seven tie-breakers in cases of a tie in overall points:

1. Highest placement at an event. If a skater placed 1st and 3rd, the tiebreaker is the 1st place, and that beats a skater who placed 2nd in both events.
2. Highest combined total scores in both events. If a skater earned 200 points at one event and 250 at a second, that skater would win in the second tie-break over a skater who earned 200 points at one event and 150 at another.
3. Participated in two events.
4. Highest combined scores in the free skating/free dance portion of both events.
5. Highest individual score in the free skating/free dance portion from one event.
6. Highest combined scores in the short program/short dance of both events.
7. Highest number of total participants at the events.

If a tie remains, it is considered unbreakable and the tied skaters all advanced to the Junior Grand Prix Final.

=== Qualification standings ===
| Pts. | Men | Women | Pairs | Ice dance |
|---|---|---|---|---|
| 30 | (Individual Neutral Athletes); Lev Lazarev | (Individual Neutral Athletes); Sofiia Dzepka | | (Individual Neutral Athletes); Mariia Fefelova; Artem Valov |
| 30 | (Individual Neutral Athletes); Lev Lazarev | (Australia); Hana Bath | | (Individual Neutral Athletes); Mariia Fefelova; Artem Valov |
| 28 | | (Japan); Mei Okada | (Individual Neutral Athletes); Polina Shesheleva; Egor Karnaukhov | (Germany); Darya Grimm; Grigorii Rodin |
| 28 | | (Japan); Mei Okada | (Individual Neutral Athletes); Polina Shesheleva; Egor Karnaukhov | (France); Ambre Perrier Gianesini; Samuel Blanc Klaperman |
| 28 | | (Japan); Sumika Kanazawa | (China); Chen Yuxuan; Dong Yinbo | (France); Dania Mouaden; Théo Bigot |
| 28 | | (Japan); Sumika Kanazawa | (China); Chen Yuxuan; Dong Yinbo | (United States); Hana Maria Aboian; Daniil Veselukhin |
| 26 | (Thailand); Hiro Kaewtathip | (China); Wang Yihan | (Spain); Anita Mapelli; Noah Quesada Grau | (Italy); Zoe Bianchi; Daniel Basile |
| 26 | (Switzerland); Ean Weiler | (China); Wang Yihan | (Spain); Anita Mapelli; Noah Quesada Grau | (Italy); Zoe Bianchi; Daniel Basile |
| 26 | (South Korea); Choi Ha-bin | (China); Wang Yihan | (Spain); Anita Mapelli; Noah Quesada Grau | (Italy); Zoe Bianchi; Daniel Basile |
| 26 | (Japan); Daiya Ebihara | (China); Liu Yuxuan | (Spain); Anita Mapelli; Noah Quesada Grau | (Italy); Zoe Bianchi; Daniel Basile |
| 26 | (New Zealand); Yanhao Li | (China); Liu Yuxuan | (Spain); Anita Mapelli; Noah Quesada Grau | (Italy); Zoe Bianchi; Daniel Basile |
| 26 | (South Korea); Lee Jae-keun | (China); Liu Yuxuan | (Spain); Anita Mapelli; Noah Quesada Grau | (Italy); Zoe Bianchi; Daniel Basile |
| 24 | (Belgium); Denis Krouglov | (Canada); Lia Cho | | (Italy); Arianna Soldati; Nicholas Tagliabue |
| 24 | (Ukraine); Yehor Kurtsev | (China); Jin Shuxian | | (United States); Aneta Václavíková; William Lissauer |
| 22 | (Japan); Hayato Okazaki | (France); Stefania Gladki | (United States); Reagan Moss; Jakub Galbavy | (United States); Xinyu Chen; Gordei Chitipakhovian |
| 20 | (Japan); Taiga Nishino | (Switzerland); Elisabeth Dibbern | | |
| 20 | (Japan); Sena Takahashi | (Switzerland); Leandra Tzimpoukakis | | |
| 18 | | (Israel); Sophia Shifrin | (Czech Republic); Debora Anna Cohen; Lukáš Vochozka | (France); Léa Hienne; Louis Varescon |
| 18 | | (Israel); Sophia Shifrin | (Czech Republic); Debora Anna Cohen; Lukáš Vochozka | (Italy); Melissa Cachová; Ivan Morozov |
| 18 | | (Japan); Kei Yamada | (United States); Sofia Jarmoc; Luke Witkowski | (Canada); Summer Homick; Nicholas Buelow |
| 18 | | (Japan); Kei Yamada | (United States); Sofia Jarmoc; Luke Witkowski | (United States); Annelise Stapert; Maxim Korotcov |
| 17 | (Latvia); Jānis Znotiņš | | | |
| 16 | (Israel); Nikita Sheiko | | | (Canada); Chaïma Ben Khelifa; Julien Lévesque |
| 15 | | | (Individual Neutral Athletes); Taisiia Guseva; Daniil Ovchinnikov | |
| 14 | (United States); Patrick Blackwell | | | |
| 13 | | | (Georgia (country)); Zlata Kamalova; Danil Panov | (Canada); Laurence Brière; Earl Jesse Celestino |
| 13 | | | (Georgia (country)); Zlata Kamalova; Danil Panov | (Canada); Charlie Anderson; Cayden Dawson |
| 12 | (United States); Kirk Haugeto | (China); Jin Chenxi | (Canada); Marykim Ranzi; Enryck Legault | (France); Louise Cohas-Bogey; Daniil Grishin |
| 12 | (Switzerland); Sandro De Angelo | (Individual Neutral Athletes); Varvara Stahovich | (Canada); Marykim Ranzi; Enryck Legault | (France); Louise Cohas-Bogey; Daniil Grishin |
| 11 | | (Hong Kong); Ariel Guo | (China); Guo Rui; Zhang Yiwen | (Germany); Enikö Kobor; Zoard Kobor |
| 11 | | (Hong Kong); Ariel Guo | (China); Wang Chenling; Chen Yongzheng | (United States); Jane Calhoun; Mark Zheltyshev |
| 11 | | (Hong Kong); Ariel Guo | (Italy); Polina Polman; Gabriel Renoldi | (United States); Jane Calhoun; Mark Zheltyshev |
| 10 | | (Georgia (country)); Inga Gurgenidze | | (China); Yin Shanjie; Yang Shirui |
| 9 | (South Korea); Chung Jae-wook | (Germany); Diana Alexandra Ziesecke | (France); Clélia Liget-Latus; Allan Daniel Fisher | (Azerbaijan); Sofiia Beznosikova; Max Leleu |
| 9 | (South Korea); Chung Jae-wook | (South Korea); Jang Ha-rin | (France); Clélia Liget-Latus; Allan Daniel Fisher | (Azerbaijan); Sofiia Beznosikova; Max Leleu |
| 9 | (Hong Kong); Li Jiarui | (Switzerland); Valeriya Ezhova | (France); Clélia Liget-Latus; Allan Daniel Fisher | (Azerbaijan); Sofiia Beznosikova; Max Leleu |
| 9 | (Hong Kong); Li Jiarui | (Georgia (country)); Amaliia Nasybullina | (France); Clélia Liget-Latus; Allan Daniel Fisher | (Azerbaijan); Sofiia Beznosikova; Max Leleu |
| 8 | (South Korea); Yu Dong-han | (South Korea); Ko Na-yeon | (Canada); Miroslava Oreshkin; Vladimir Furman | (Israel); Liliia Litenko; Aleksandr Ryzhenkov |
| 8 | (Individual Neutral Athletes); Vasil Barakhouski | (South Korea); Ko Na-yeon | (Canada); Miroslava Oreshkin; Vladimir Furman | (Canada); Audra Gans; Danil Pak |
| 8 | (Individual Neutral Athletes); Vasil Barakhouski | (South Korea); Ko Na-yeon | (Canada); Miroslava Oreshkin; Vladimir Furman | (China); Li Zhixuan; Ge Quanshuo |
| 7 | (Switzerland); Gion Schmid | (United States); Emilia Nemirovsky | (Canada); Brianna Dion; Jacob Côté | (Czech Republic); Diane Sznajder; Jáchym Novák |
| 7 | (Switzerland); Gion Schmid | (United States); Skylar Lautowa-Peguero | (Canada); Brianna Dion; Jacob Côté | (Czech Republic); Diane Sznajder; Jáchym Novák |
| 7 | (Japan); Shun Uemura | (China); Fan Yunxi | (Canada); Brianna Dion; Jacob Côté | (Czech Republic); Diane Sznajder; Jáchym Novák |
| 7 | (Japan); Shun Uemura | (Cyprus); Olivia Bazlova | (Canada); Brianna Dion; Jacob Côté | (Czech Republic); Diane Sznajder; Jáchym Novák |
| 6 | (Estonia); Ilya Nesterov | (Slovakia); Olívia Lengyelová | | (United States); Anaelle Kouevi; Yann Homawoo |
| 5 | (Norway); Daniil Valanov | (Estonia); Sofia Nekrassova | (Canada); Alia Tang; William Bocskay | (Germany); Dessie Abigail Hoewing-Moxley; Artyom Sladkov |
| 5 | (Canada); William Chan | (Estonia); Sofia Nekrassova | (Canada); Alia Tang; William Bocskay | (Germany); Dessie Abigail Hoewing-Moxley; Artyom Sladkov |
| 5 | (Israel); Kirill Sheiko | (United States); Rachel Samiri | (Italy); Irina Napolitano; Edoardo Comi | (Japan); Ayumi Shibayama; Tomoki Kimura |
| 5 | (China); Tian Tonghe | (United States); Rachel Samiri | (Italy); Irina Napolitano; Edoardo Comi | (Japan); Ayumi Shibayama; Tomoki Kimura |
| 5 | (United Kingdom); Lloyd Thomson | (Japan); Karin Miyazaki | (Italy); Irina Napolitano; Edoardo Comi | (Italy); Laura Finelli; Tommaso Barison |
| 5 | (Canada); Grayson Long | (Japan); Karin Miyazaki | (Italy); Irina Napolitano; Edoardo Comi | (Italy); Laura Finelli; Tommaso Barison |
| 5 | (Georgia (country)); Makar Nikolaev | (Japan); Karin Miyazaki | (Italy); Irina Napolitano; Edoardo Comi | (Canada); Victoria Carandiuc; Andrei Carandiuc |
| 4 | (United States); Henry Gao | (Latvia); Kira Baranovska | (China); Song Zeyu; Zhao Guangye | (France); Alexandra Balyan; Nikolai Balabardin |
| 4 | (Germany); Leon Rojkov | (United States); Jessica Jurka | (Czech Republic); Leontina Horčičková; Jindřich Klement | (France); Alexandra Balyan; Nikolai Balabardin |
| 4 | (Germany); Leon Rojkov | (South Korea); Hwang Jeong-yul | (Canada); Amy Ritchie; Mitchell Dunn | (France); Alexandra Balyan; Nikolai Balabardin |
| 3 | (United States); Caleb Farrington | (Latvia); Nataša Jermoļicka | (Canada); Kaydee Kallay; Étienne Lacasse | (United States); Grace Fischer; Luke Fischer |
| 3 | (Turkey); Kaan Şanal | (Finland); Annika Pellonmaa | (United States); Juliet Meek; Devin Meek | (United States); Grace Fischer; Luke Fischer |
| 3 | (China); Sun Yihe | (Japan); Kaoruko Wada | (United States); Juliet Meek; Devin Meek | (United States); Grace Fischer; Luke Fischer |
| 3 | (Kazakhstan); Artur Smagulov | (Japan); Rena Uezono | (United States); Alena Kerr; Sam Herbert | (United States); Grace Fischer; Luke Fischer |
| 3 | (Kazakhstan); Artur Smagulov | (Netherlands); Angel Delevaque | (United States); Alena Kerr; Sam Herbert | (United States); Grace Fischer; Luke Fischer |
| 2 | (United Kingdom); Edward Solovyov | (Estonia); Elina Goidina | | |
| 2 | (Poland); Oscar Oliver | (Austria); Hannah Frank | | |
| 2 | (China); Lu Boren | (Hungary); Polina Dzsumanyijazova | | |
| 2 | (United States); Louis Mallane | (Hungary); Polina Dzsumanyijazova | | |
| 2 | (Hong Kong); Jarvis Ho | (Canada); Victoria Barakhtina | | |
| 1 | (China); Li Zhuolang | (Finland); Venla Sinisalo | | |
| 1 | (Azerbaijan); Aleksandr Pliushchenko | (Czech Republic); Darya Timofeeva | | |
| 1 | (Netherlands); Leon Lo | (Germany); Anna Gerke | | |
| 1 | (Czech Republic); Jakub Tykal | (Germany); Anna Gerke | | |

=== Qualifiers ===
| No. | Men | Women | Pairs | Ice dance |
|---|---|---|---|---|
| 1 | (Individual Neutral Athletes); Lev Lazarev | (Individual Neutral Athletes); Sofiia Dzepka | (Individual Neutral Athletes); Polina Shesheleva; Egor Karnaukhov | (Individual Neutral Athletes); Mariia Fefelova; Artem Valov |
| 2 | (Thailand); Hiro Kaewtathip | (Australia); Hana Bath | (China); Chen Yuxuan; Dong Yinbo | (Germany); Darya Grimm; Grigorii Rodin |
| 3 | (Switzerland); Ean Weiler | (Japan); Mei Okada | (Spain); Anita Mapelli; Noah Quesada Grau | (France); Ambre Perrier Gianesini; Samuel Blanc Klaperman |
| 4 | (South Korea); Choi Ha-bin | (Japan); Sumika Kanazawa | (United States); Reagan Moss; Jakub Galbavy | (France); Dania Mouaden; Théo Bigot |
| 5 | (Japan); Daiya Ebihara | (China); Wang Yihan | (Czech Republic); Debora Anna Cohen; Lukáš Vochozka | (United States); Hana Maria Aboian; Daniil Veselukhin |
| 6 | (New Zealand); Yanhao Li | (China); Liu Yuxuan | (United States); Sofia Jarmoc; Luke Witkowski | (Italy); Zoe Bianchi; Daniel Basile |

Alternates

| No. | Men | Women | Pairs | Ice dance |
|---|---|---|---|---|
| 1 | (South Korea); Lee Jae-keun | (Canada); Lia Cho | (Individual Neutral Athletes); Taisiia Guseva; Daniil Ovchinnikov | (Italy); Arianna Soldati; Nicholas Tagliabue |
| 2 | (Belgium); Denis Krouglov | (China); Jin Shuxian | (Georgia (country)); Zlata Kamalova; Danil Panov | (United States); Aneta Václavíková; William Lissauer |
| 3 | (Ukraine); Yehor Kurtsev | (France); Stefania Gladki | (Canada); Marykim Ranzi; Enryck Legault | (United States); Xinyu Chen; Gordei Chitipakhovian |

== Top scores ==
=== Men's singles ===
Top 10 best scores in the men's combined total
| No. | Skater | Nation | Score | Event |
|---|---|---|---|---|
| 1 | Lev Lazarev | (Individual Neutral Athletes) Individual Neutral Athlete | 260.90 | 2026 JGP Bangkok |
| 2 | Choi Ha-bin | South Korea | 246.41 | 2026 JGP Latvia |
| 3 | Yanhao Li | New Zealand | 244.68 | 2026 JGP Bangkok |
| 4 | Hiro Kaewtathip | Thailand | 233.73 | 2026 JGP Ljubljana |
| 5 | Lee Jae-keun | South Korea | 229.77 | 2026 JGP Latvia |
| 6 | Denis Krouglov | Belgium | 228.64 | 2026 JGP Gdańsk |
| 7 | Taiga Nishino | Japan | 227.28 | 2026 JGP Ljubljana |
| 8 | Ean Weiler | Switzerland | 221.73 | 2026 JGP Latvia |
| 9 | Daiya Ebihara | Japan | 219.76 | 2026 JGP Xi'an |
| 10 | Hayato Okazaki | Japan | 217.27 | 2026 JGP Batumi |

Top 10 best scores in the men's short program
| No. | Skater | Nation | Score | Event |
|---|---|---|---|---|
| 1 | Lev Lazarev | (Individual Neutral Athletes) Individual Neutral Athlete | 86.76 | 2026 JGP Xi'an |
| 2 | Yanhao Li | New Zealand | 86.65 | 2026 JGP Bangkok |
| 3 | Sena Takahashi | Japan | 86.19 | 2026 JGP Batumi |
| 4 | Lee Jae-keun | South Korea | 85.13 | 2026 JGP Ljubljana |
| 5 | Taiga Nishino | Japan | 84.29 | 2026 JGP Ljubljana |
| 6 | Hiro Kaewtathip | Thailand | 83.67 | 2026 JGP Ljubljana |
| 7 | Denis Krouglov | Belgium | 82.09 | 2026 JGP Gdańsk |
| 8 | Nikita Sheiko | Israel | 81.23 | 2026 JGP Ljubljana |
| 9 | Ean Weiler | Switzerland | 81.17 | 2026 JGP Batumi |
| 10 | Shun Uemura | Japan | 80.40 | 2026 JGP Bangkok |

Top 10 best scores in the men's free skating
| No. | Skater | Nation | Score | Event |
|---|---|---|---|---|
| 1 | Lev Lazarev | (Individual Neutral Athletes) Individual Neutral Athlete | 174.43 | 2026 JGP Bangkok |
| 2 | Choi Ha-bin | South Korea | 170.20 | 2026 JGP Latvia |
| 3 | Yanhao Li | New Zealand | 158.03 | 2026 JGP Bangkok |
| 4 | Taiga Nishino | Japan | 150.69 | 2026 JGP Bangkok |
| 5 | Hayato Okazaki | Japan | 150.09 | 2026 JGP Batumi |
| 6 | Hiro Kaewtathip | Thailand | 150.06 | 2026 JGP Ljubljana |
| 7 | Lee Jae-keun | South Korea | 146.57 | 2026 JGP Latvia |
| 8 | Denis Krouglov | Belgium | 146.55 | 2026 JGP Gdańsk |
| 9 | Daiya Ebihara | Japan | 146.47 | 2026 JGP Xi'an |
| 10 | Ean Weiler | Switzerland | 143.99 | 2026 JGP Latvia |

=== Women's singles ===
Top 10 best scores in the women's combined total
| No. | Skater | Nation | Score | Event |
|---|---|---|---|---|
| 1 | Sofiia Dzepka | (Individual Neutral Athletes) Individual Neutral Athlete | 213.28 | 2026 JGP Xi'an |
| 2 | Hana Bath | Australia | 209.07 | 2026 JGP Latvia |
| 3 | Mei Okada | Japan | 206.38 | 2026 JGP Ankara |
| 4 | Sumika Kanazawa | Japan | 202.79 | 2026 JGP Bangkok |
| 5 | Wang Yihan | China | 201.82 | 2026 JGP Batumi |
| 6 | Sophia Shifrin | Israel | 196.29 | 2026 JGP Batumi |
| 7 | Lia Cho | Canada | 195.76 | 2026 JGP Gdańsk |
| 8 | Jin Shuxian | China | 194.50 | 2026 JGP Ankara |
| 9 | Kei Yamada | Japan | 191.44 | 2026 JGP Latvia |
| 10 | Stefania Gladki | France | 189.92 | 2026 JGP Batumi |

Top 10 best scores in the women's short program
| No. | Skater | Nation | Score | Event |
|---|---|---|---|---|
| 1 | Mei Okada | Japan | 74.27 | 2026 JGP Ankara |
| 2 | Wang Yihan | China | 73.38 | 2026 JGP Batumi |
| 3 | Sofiia Dzepka | (Individual Neutral Athletes) Individual Neutral Athlete | 72.74 | 2026 JGP Xi'an |
| 4 | Sumika Kanazawa | Japan | 70.38 | 2026 JGP Bangkok |
| 5 | Ko Na-yeon | South Korea | 70.21 | 2026 JGP Ankara |
| 6 | Liu Yuxuan | China | 70.10 | 2026 JGP Ljubljana |
| 7 | Lia Cho | Canada | 69.42 | 2026 JGP Gdańsk |
| 8 | Hana Bath | Australia | 69.06 | 2026 JGP Latvia |
| 9 | Kei Yamada | Japan | 68.98 | 2026 JGP Batumi |
| 10 | Jin Shuxian | China | 68.11 | 2026 JGP Ankara |

Top 10 best scores in the women's free skating
| No. | Skater | Nation | Score | Event |
|---|---|---|---|---|
| 1 | Sofiia Dzepka | (Individual Neutral Athletes) Individual Neutral Athlete | 140.54 | 2026 JGP Xi'an |
| 2 | Hana Bath | Australia | 140.01 | 2026 JGP Latvia |
| 3 | Mei Okada | Japan | 133.00 | 2026 JGP Latvia |
| 4 | Sumika Kanazawa | Japan | 132.41 | 2026 JGP Bangkok |
| 5 | Sophia Shifrin | Israel | 129.62 | 2026 JGP Batumi |
| 6 | Jin Shuxian | China | 128.72 | 2026 JGP Xi'an |
| 7 | Wang Yihan | China | 128.44 | 2026 JGP Batumi |
| 8 | Lia Cho | Canada | 126.34 | 2026 JGP Gdańsk |
| 9 | Kei Yamada | Japan | 125.55 | 2026 JGP Latvia |
| 10 | Liu Yuxuan | China | 122.85 | 2026 JGP Xi'an |

=== Pairs ===
Top 10 best scores in the pairs' combined total
| No. | Team | Nation | Score | Event |
|---|---|---|---|---|
| 1 | Taisiia Guseva; Daniil Ovchinnikov | (Individual Neutral Athletes) Individual Neutral Athlete | 196.91 | 2026 JGP Ankara |
| 2 | Polina Shesheleva; Egor Karnaukhov | (Individual Neutral Athletes) Individual Neutral Athlete | 191.84 | 2026 JGP Xi'an |
| 3 | Anita Mapelli; Noah Quesada Grau | Spain | 166.81 | 2026 JGP Gdańsk |
| 4 | Zlata Kamalova; Danil Panov | Georgia | 163.95 | 2026 JGP Gdańsk |
| 5 | Chen Yuxuan; Dong Yinbo | China | 157.52 | 2026 JGP Xi'an |
| 6 | Guo Rui; Zhang Yiwen | China | 151.91 | 2026 JGP Gdańsk |
| 7 | Reagan Moss; Jakub Galbavy | United States | 145.28 | 2026 JGP Latvia |
| 8 | Debora Anna Cohen; Lukáš Vochozka | Czech Republic | 143.49 | 2026 JGP Latvia |
| 9 | Sofia Jarmoc; Luke Witkowski | United States | 139.59 | 2026 JGP Ankara |
| 10 | Polina Polman; Gabriel Renoldi | Italy | 136.55 | 2026 JGP Gdańsk |

Top 10 best scores in the pairs' short program
| No. | Team | Nation | Score | Event |
|---|---|---|---|---|
| 1 | Taisiia Guseva; Daniil Ovchinnikov | (Individual Neutral Athletes) Individual Neutral Athlete | 70.48 | 2026 JGP Ankara |
| 2 | Polina Shesheleva; Egor Karnaukhov | (Individual Neutral Athletes) Individual Neutral Athlete | 65.54 | 2026 JGP Xi'an |
| 3 | Anita Mapelli; Noah Quesada Grau | Spain | 61.66 | 2026 JGP Gdańsk |
| 4 | Zlata Kamalova; Danil Panov | Georgia | 61.05 | 2026 JGP Gdańsk |
| 5 | Guo Rui; Zhang Yiwen | China | 57.82 | 2026 JGP Gdańsk |
| 6 | Chen Yuxuan; Dong Yinbo | China | 57.02 | 2026 JGP Xi'an |
| 7 | Reagan Moss; Jakub Galbavy | United States | 56.32 | 2026 JGP Latvia |
| 8 | Irina Napolitano; Edoardo Comi | Italy | 53.88 | 2026 JGP Gdańsk |
| 9 | Debora Anna Cohen; Lukáš Vochozka | Czech Republic | 53.26 | 2026 JGP Latvia |
| 10 | Polina Polman; Gabriel Renoldi | Italy | 50.17 | 2026 JGP Gdańsk |

Top 10 best scores in the pairs' free skating
| No. | Team | Nation | Score | Event |
|---|---|---|---|---|
| 1 | Taisiia Guseva; Daniil Ovchinnikov | (Individual Neutral Athletes) Individual Neutral Athlete | 127.53 | 2026 JGP Ankara |
| 2 | Polina Shesheleva; Egor Karnaukhov | (Individual Neutral Athletes) Individual Neutral Athlete | 126.30 | 2026 JGP Xi'an |
| 3 | Anita Mapelli; Noah Quesada Grau | Spain | 105.15 | 2026 JGP Gdańsk |
| 4 | Chen Yuxuan; Dong Yinbo | China | 103.64 | 2026 JGP Xi'an |
| 5 | Zlata Kamalova; Danil Panov | Georgia | 102.90 | 2026 JGP Gdańsk |
| 6 | Guo Rui; Zhang Yiwen | China | 94.09 | 2026 JGP Gdańsk |
| 7 | Reagan Moss; Jakub Galbavy | United States | 92.65 | 2026 JGP Gdańsk |
| 8 | Debora Anna Cohen; Lukáš Vochozka | Czech Republic | 90.23 | 2026 JGP Latvia |
| 9 | Sofia Jarmoc; Luke Witkowski | United States | 89.68 | 2026 JGP Ankara |
| 10 | Polina Polman; Gabriel Renoldi | Italy | 86.38 | 2026 JGP Gdańsk |

=== Ice dance ===
Top 10 season's best scores in the combined total (ice dance)
| No. | Team | Nation | Score | Event |
|---|---|---|---|---|
| 1 | Darya Grimm; Grigorii Rodin | Germany | 169.40 | 2026 JGP Ljubljana |
| 2 | Mariia Fefelova; Artem Valov | (Individual Neutral Athletes) Individual Neutral Athlete | 166.09 | 2026 JGP Bangkok |
| 3 | Ambre Perrier Gianesini; Samuel Blanc Klaperman | France | 164.00 | 2026 JGP Ljubljana |
| 4 | Hana Maria Aboian; Daniil Veselukhin | United States | 163.43 | 2026 JGP Ankara |
| 5 | Dania Mouaden; Théo Bigot | France | 162.57 | 2026 JGP Latvia |
| 6 | Zoe Bianchi; Daniel Basile | Italy | 160.28 | 2026 JGP Bangkok |
| 7 | Aneta Václavíková; William Lissauer | United States | 159.05 | 2026 JGP Ljubljana |
| 8 | Arianna Soldati; Nicholas Tagliabue | Italy | 154.22 | 2026 JGP Gdańsk |
| 9 | Xinyu Chen; Gordei Chitipakhovian | United States | 153.65 | 2026 JGP Batumi |
| 10 | Melissa Cachova; Ivan Morozov | Italy | 151.10 | 2026 JGP Gdańsk |

Top 10 season's best scores in the rhythm dance
| No. | Team | Nation | Score | Event |
|---|---|---|---|---|
| 1 | Hana Maria Aboian; Daniil Veselukhin | United States | 68.93 | 2026 JGP Gdańsk |
| 2 | Darya Grimm; Grigorii Rodin | Germany | 67.02 | 2026 JGP Ljubljana |
| 3 | Mariia Fefelova; Artem Valov | (Individual Neutral Athletes) Individual Neutral Athlete | 65.33 | 2026 JGP Bangkok |
| 4 | Dania Mouaden; Théo Bigot | France | 65.09 | 2026 JGP Ankara |
| 5 | Ambre Perrier Gianesini; Samuel Blanc Klaperman | France | 64.84 | 2026 JGP Ljubljana |
| 6 | Aneta Václavíková; William Lissauer | United States | 64.73 | 2026 JGP Ljubljana |
| 7 | Zoe Bianchi; Daniel Basile | Italy | 63.38 | 2026 JGP Bangkok |
| 8 | Arianna Soldati; Nicholas Tagliabue | Italy | 62.36 | 2026 JGP Gdańsk |
| 9 | Xinyu Chen; Gordei Chitipakhovian | United States | 61.70 | 2026 JGP Batumi |
| 10 | Annelise Stapert; Maxim Korotcov | United States | 60.36 | 2026 JGP Bangkok |

Top 10 season's best scores in the free dance
| No. | Team | Nation | Score | Event |
|---|---|---|---|---|
| 1 | Darya Grimm; Grigorii Rodin | Germany | 102.38 | 2026 JGP Ljubljana |
| 2 | Mariia Fefelova; Artem Valov | (Individual Neutral Athletes) Individual Neutral Athlete | 100.76 | 2026 JGP Bangkok |
| 3 | Ambre Perrier Gianesini; Samuel Blanc Klaperman | France | 99.16 | 2026 JGP Ljubljana |
| 4 | Dania Mouaden; Théo Bigot | France | 98.16 | 2026 JGP Latvia |
| 5 | Hana Maria Aboian; Daniil Veselukhin | United States | 97.26 | 2026 JGP Ankara |
| 6 | Zoe Bianchi; Daniel Basile | Italy | 96.90 | 2026 JGP Bangkok |
| 7 | Aneta Václavíková; William Lissauer | United States | 96.31 | 2026 JGP Latvia |
| 8 | Melissa Cachova; Ivan Morozov | Italy | 92.08 | 2026 JGP Gdańsk |
| 9 | Chaima Ben Khelifa; Julien Levesque | Canada | 92.01 | 2026 JGP Gdańsk |
| 10 | Xinyu Chen; Gordei Chitipakhovian | United States | 91.95 | 2026 JGP Batumi |
