= Daniil Valanov =

Norwegian figure skater (born 2008)

- Daniil Valanov at the Nordics Open 2026

Figure skating career
- Country: Norway
- Discipline: Men's singles
- Coach: Kristina Sontum; Jurijs Salmanovs
- Skating club: Loddefjord IL
- Began skating: 2013

Daniil Valanov is a Norwegian competitive figure skater. Valanov is a three-time Norwegian national junior champion (2023–2025). He is the first Norwegian figure skater who landed a triple axel and a quadruple.

== Career ==
=== Early career ===
Valanov competed at the advanced novice level during the 2021–22 season. He participated in several domestic competitions in Norway, achieving multiple victories on the Norwegian Cup circuit. In January 2022, he competed internationally at the Nordics Open in Hørsholm, Denmark, where he won the bronze medal in the advanced novice category with a total score of 82.78 points. Later in the season, he won the Norwegian national advanced novice title, scoring 78.54 points.

Valanov continued competing at the advanced novice level during the 2022–23 season. He opened his international season at the Tirnavia Ice Cup in Trnava, Slovakia, finishing eighth. He subsequently placed eighth at the Santa Claus Cup in Budapest and won the bronze medal at the Latvia Trophy in Riga. In January 2023, Valanov won another Norwegian national title in the advanced novice category. The following month, he earned the bronze medal at the Nordics Open in Reykjavík, Iceland, with a total score of 99.71 points. He went on to finish fifth at both the Challenge Cup in the Netherlands and the Coupe du Printemps in Luxembourg.

=== 2023–24 season: Junior international debut ===
Valanov moved up to the junior level for international competition during the 2023–24 season. He made his ISU Junior Grand Prix debut in August at the JGP Austria in Linz, finishing twentieth with a total score of 121.43 points. At his second Junior Grand Prix assignment, the JGP Poland in Gdańsk, he again finished twentieth, scoring 128.49 points. He continued his season at other junior international competitions, placing seventh at the Volvo Open Cup in Riga and eighth at the Santa Claus Cup in Budapest. In January 2024, Valanov won the Norwegian junior national championship, earning his first national title at the junior level. In February, he finished fifth at the Nordics Open in Borås, Sweden. He concluded his international championship season by making his debut at the 2024 World Junior Figure Skating Championships in Taipei, where he placed thirty-sixth in the short program and did not advance to the free skate.

=== 2024–25 season ===
Valanov began the 2024–25 season at the JGP Latvia in Riga, where he finished twenty-fourth with a total score of 122.32 points. In December 2024, he successfully defended his Norwegian junior national title, winning the competition with a score of 137.70 points. He continued competing internationally in January 2025, finishing sixth at the Volvo Open Cup in Riga and thirteenth at the Bavarian Open in Oberstdorf, Germany. In February, Valanov represented Norway at the 2025 European Youth Olympic Winter Festival in Batumi, Georgia. He finished ninth in the short program and sixth in the free skate, placing seventh overall with a total score of 162.58 points. Later in the season, he finished fourth at the Sonja Henie Trophy in Oslo and won the silver medal at the Daugava Open Cup in Riga, where he achieved a total score of 168.53 points.

=== 2025–26 season ===
Valanov opened his season on the ISU Junior Grand Prix circuit, finishing seventeenth at the JGP Latvia in Riga. At his second assignment, the JGP Poland in Gdańsk, Valanov finished thirteenth with a total score of 174.77 points. During the competition, he successfully landed a clean triple Axel, becoming the first Norwegian figure skater to land the jump in competition. Following the Junior Grand Prix series, he won the silver medal at the Swiss Ice Skating Open in Lausanne, Switzerland, scoring 173.67 points. He subsequently placed ninth at the Tallinn Trophy in Estonia. In December 2025, Valanov won his third consecutive Norwegian junior national championship, finishing first with a total score of 171.61 points. In January 2026, Valanov won bronze medals at both the Sofia Trophy in Sofia, Bulgaria, and the Nordics Open in Copenhagen, Denmark. At the latter competition, he scored 170.53 points overall. He concluded his season at the 2026 World Junior Figure Skating Championships in Tallinn, where he finished thirty-third in the short program with a score of 53.95 points and did not qualify for the free skate.

=== 2026–27 season ===
Valanov began the 2026–27 season by competing in two ISU Junior Grand Prix events. At his first assignment, the JGP Latvia in Riga, he finished eleventh overall with a total score of 179.50 points. At his second assignment, the JGP Georgia in Batumi, Valanov placed tenth in the short program with 64.68 points. He delivered a strong free skate, finishing third in that segment with a score of 133.43 points. His performance moved him to sixth place overall with a combined score of 198.11 points, setting new ISU-recognized personal bests in the short program, free skate, and total score. In October, Valanov competed in the senior men's event at the Jelgava Cup in Latvia, finishing second with a total score of 160.37 points.

== Technique ==
Valanov is capable of performing all six types of triple jumps, including the triple Axel, as well as the quadruple Salchow jump.

At the 2025 JGP Solidarity Cup in Gdańsk, Poland, Valanov became the first Norwegian figure skater to successfully land a triple Axel in an international competition. He executed the jump in the free skate, receiving a grade of execution (GOE) of −0.69. He subsequently landed the jump with a positive GOE for the first time in the short program at the 2026 Sofia Trophy in January, receiving a GOE of +0.80.

Valanov began attempting the quadruple Salchow in competition during the 2025–26 season. At the 2026 JGP Batumi in Georgia, he successfully landed a quadruple Salchow–triple toe loop combination in the free skate, receiving a positive GOE of +1.25. This marked the first time a Norwegian male figure skater had successfully executed a quadruple–triple jump combination in competition.

Valanov has also expressed his ambition to develop additional types of quadruple jumps beyond the Salchow. He has reportedly landed the quadruple Lutz, flip, and toe loop in practice.

== Competitive highlights ==
- JGP – Event of the ISU Junior Grand Prix Series

Competition placements at senior level
Season	2026–27
Jelgava Cup	2nd

Competition placements at junior level
Season	2023–24	2024–25	2025–26	2026–27
World Junior Championships	36th		33rd	
Norwegian Championships	1st	1st	1st	
JGP Austria	20th			
JGP Poland	20th		13th	
JGP Latvia		24th	17th	11th
JGP Batumi				6th
Volvo Open Cup	7th	6th		
Santa Claus Cup	8th			
Nordics Open	5th		3rd	
Sonja Henie Trophy	6th	4th		
Bavarian Open		13th		
European Youth Olympic Festival		7th		
Daugava Open Cup		2nd		
Swiss Ice Skating Open			2nd	
Tallinn Trophy			9th	
Sofia Trophy			3rd	

== Detailed results ==
ISU personal best scores in the +5/-5 GOE System
Segment	Type	Score	Event
Total	TSS	198.11	2026 JGP Batumi
Short program	TSS	64.68	2026 JGP Batumi
Short program	TES	35.04	2026 JGP Batumi
Short program	PCS	29.64	2026 JGP Batumi
Free skating	TSS	133.43	2026 JGP Batumi
Free skating	TES	69.66	2026 JGP Batumi
Free skating	PCS	63.77	2026 JGP Batumi

=== Senior level ===
Results in the 2026–27 season
Date	Event	SP		FS		Total	
Date	Event	P	Score	P	Score	P	Score
Oct 16–17, 2026	(Latvia) 2026 Jelgava Cup	2	58.95	1	101.42	2	160.37

=== Junior level ===
2026–27 season
Date	Event	SP	FS	Total
Sep 24–25, 2026	(Georgia (country)) 2026 JGP Batumi	10; 64.68	3; 133.43	6; 198.11
Aug 27–29, 2026	(Latvia) 2026 JGP Riga	10; 60.41	9; 119.09	11; 179.50
2025–26 season
Date	Event	SP	FS	Total
Mar 4, 2026	(Estonia) 2026 World Junior Championships	33; 53.95	DNQ	33; 53.95
Jan 30–31, 2026	(Denmark) 2026 Nordics Open	2; 63.88	3; 106.65	3; 170.53
Jan 9–10, 2026	(Bulgaria) 2026 Sofia Trophy	1; 63.17	5; 103.39	3; 166.56
Dec 6–7, 2025	(Norway) 2026 Norwegian Championships	1; 56.14	1; 115.47	1; 171.61
Nov 26–27, 2025	(Estonia) 2025 Tallinn Trophy	12; 51.30	9; 106.34	9; 157.64
Oct 23–24, 2025	(Switzerland) 2025 Swiss Ice Skating Open	2; 61.65	2; 112.02	2; 173.67
Oct 2–4, 2025	(Poland) 2025 JGP Solidarity Cup	15; 58.04	13; 116.73	13; 174.77
Aug 21–23, 2025	(Latvia) 2025 JGP Riga Cup	19; 47.05	17; 91.48	17; 138.53
2024–25 season
Date	Event	SP	FS	Total
Mar 14–15, 2025	(Latvia) 2025 Daugava Open Cup	2; 62.51	3; 106.02	2; 168.53
Mar 7–8, 2025	(Norway) 2025 Sonja Henie Trophy	2; 55.32	4; 96.39	4; 151.71
Feb 12–14, 2025	(Georgia (country)) 2025 European Youth Olympic Winter Festival	9; 55.16	6; 107.42	7; 162.58
Jan 24–25, 2025	(Germany) 2025 Bavarian Open	13; 53.19	13; 93.76	13; 146.95
Jan 16–17, 2025	(Latvia) 2025 Volvo Open Cup	8; 48.19	6; 96.05	6; 144.24
Dec 7–8, 2024	(Norway) 2025 Norwegian Championships	1; 50.88	1; 86.82	1; 137.70
Aug 29–31, 2024	(Latvia) 2024 JGP Riga Cup	27; 35.46	18; 86.86	24; 122.32
2023–24 season
Date	Event	SP	FS	Total
Mar 8–9, 2024	(Norway) 2024 Sonja Henie Trophy	6; 51.96	7; 91.99	6; 143.95
Feb 29, 2024	(Chinese Taipei) 2024 World Junior Championships	36; 49.33	DNQ	36; 49.33
Feb 2–3, 2024	(Sweden) 2024 Nordics Open	5; 49.81	5; 90.47	5; 140.28
Jan 27–28, 2024	(Norway) 2024 Norwegian Championships	1; 48.60	1; 81.27	1; 129.87
Nov 30 – Dec 1, 2023	(Hungary) 2023 Santa Claus Cup	5; 54.46	9; 92.47	8; 146.93
Nov 2–3, 2023	(Latvia) 2023 Volvo Open Cup	9; 49.62	7; 94.77	7; 144.39
Sep 28–30, 2023	(Poland) 2023 JGP Solidarity Cup	22; 41.82	19; 86.67	20; 128.49
Aug 31 – Sep 2, 2023	2023 JGP Cup of Austria	21; 43.45	19; 77.98	20; 121.43
