= Hana Bath =

Australian figure skater (born 2010)

- Bath at the 2026 JGP Latvia

Personal information
- Other names: Hana Ishizaki 石崎波奈 ハナ・バス
- Born: 6 March 2010 (age 16) Hobart, Tasmania, Australia
- Home town: Perth, Australia
- Height: 1.57 m (5 ft 2 in)

Figure skating career
- Country: Australia
- Discipline: Women's singles
- Coach: Kensuke Nakaniwa; Makoto Nakata; Momoe Naguma; Aya Tanoue; Niina Takeno
- Skating club: Western Australian Ice Skating Association
- Began skating: 2015

Medal record
Australian Championships
Gold medal – first place	2023–24 Erina	Singles
Gold medal – first place	2024–25 Melbourne	Singles
Silver medal – second place	2022–23 Boondall	Singles
World Junior Championships
Silver medal – second place	2026 Tallinn	Singles

Hana Bath (born 6 March 2010) is an Australian figure skater. She is the 2026 World Junior silver medalist, a three-time ISU Junior Grand Prix medalist (2 gold, 1 silver), and a two-time Australian national champion (2024–25).

Bath is the first Australian woman to land a triple Axel and also the first to land a triple Axel–triple toe loop combination. She is the first Australian woman since Stephanie Zhang in 2000 to win an ISU Junior Grand Prix medal. and the first Australian woman to medal at the World Junior Championships.She's also the first Australian woman to win a ISU Junior Grand Prix of Figure Skating during the 2026-27 ISU Junior Grand Prix in Riga, Latvia.

== Personal life ==
Bath was born on 6 March 2010 in Hobart, Tasmania, Australia to a Japanese mother and Australian father. She also has a brother who is three years younger. Bath was raised in Perth and in December 2024, moved to Osaka, Japan, where her grandmother lives.

While Bath currently holds dual citizenship for Australia and Japan, she will be required by Japanese law to relinquish one of her citizenships before her twenty-second birthday.

== Career ==
=== Early years ===
Bath began learning how to skate in 2015 at the Cockburn Ice Arena in Perth, Australia. Throughout her early skating career, she was coached by Evgeni and Maria Borounov until December 2024. From the age of six, during visits to her grandparents in Japan, Bath would train with Taijin Hiraike and Yukako Sugita. During this time, she also observed and trained alongside Kazuki Tomono, an experience that had a significant influence on her.

From a young age, Bath was inspired and influenced by two-time Olympian Australian figure skater Kailani Craine. At the 2019–20 Australian Championships, Bath won the gold medal on the basic novice level.

=== 2022–23 season ===
Bath made her international debut at the 2022 South East Asian Open Trophy, winning the silver medal at the advanced novice level. She then competed at both the junior and senior level at the 2022–23 Australian Championships. At the junior level, Bath placed first in the short program and first in the free skate. During the free skate, she attempted a triple Axel in the free skate but fell. At the senior level, Bath placed third in the short program after falling on her planned jump combination and doubling her triple loop attempt. Bath then placed second in the free skate, once again falling on a triple Axel attempt. Overall, she won the silver medal.

=== 2023–24 season: Junior international debut, first national title ===
Bath made her junior level international debut at the ISU Junior Grand Prix in August at the 2023 JGP Thailand. There, Bath attempted a triple Axel during her free skate, although she fell on the attempt and it was marked as underrotated. Bath placed thirteenth in the short program and free skate, finishing thirteenth overall. At the 2023 JGP Japan, Bath elected not to attempt a triple Axel. Bath placed seventh in the short program and fourth in the free skate to finish sixth overall.

In December, Bath competed at both the junior and senior levels at the 2023–24 Australian Championships. Bath placed first in both segments of the junior championships and won the junior national title for a second consecutive time. At the senior championships, Bath placed second in the short program and first in the free skate, finishing first overall to win her first senior national title.

Bath ended her season at the 2024 World Junior Championships, where she did not qualify for the free skate after placing twenty-sixth in the short program with a score of 52.48.

=== 2024–25 season ===
Bath started her season in Thailand at the 2024 JGP Thailand, where she placed seventh. She competed at her home rink at the 2024 Swan Trophy, winning the gold medal. At her second Junior Grand Prix event, the 2024 JGP China, Bath placed ninth.

In December, Bath competed at the junior and senior level at the 2024–25 Australian Championships, taking gold at both events where she successfully landed the triple axel. This was the first time she cleanly landed and triple axel in competition The following month, it was announced that Bath had left her longtime coaches, Evgeni and Maria Borounov, and had moved to her grandmother's hometown of Osaka, Japan to train full time under Taijin Hiraike and Yukako Sugita.

Bath ended her season at the 2025 World Junior Championships, where she placed seventeenth in the short program with a personal best score. During her free skate, Bath landed a triple Axel-double toe combination. This was the first time she cleanly landed a triple Axel combination in competition. She placed fourth in the free skate and tenth overall with personal best free skate and combined total scores.

=== 2025–26 season: World Junior silver medalist ===
Bath began her season at the 2025 JGP Thailand, where she placed ninth in the short program and third in the free skate, landing a clean triple Axel-double toe combination, and fourth overall. At the 2025 JGP United Arab Emirates, Bath skated a clean short program and earned a new personal best score. During the free skate, Bath became the first Australian woman to land two clean triple axels, landing a solo triple Axel and a triple Axel-triple toe combination. Bath placed second in the free skate behind Japanese skater Mao Shimada to win the silver medal overall.

In January, Bath transferred to the MF Figure Skating Academy in Funabashi, Chiba Prefecture, where her new coaches became Kensuke Nakaniwa, Makoto Nakata, Momoe Nagumo, Aya Tanoue, and Niina Takeno.

Two months later, Bath competed at the 2026 World Junior Championships, placing third in the short program. During her free skate, Bath skated near perfect, winning the segment to take the silver medal behind Mao Shimada. She set personal best scores in both the short program and the free skate, hence also scoring a personal best in the overall score. With this result, Bath made history as the first singles skater representing Australia to win a medal at any ISU Championship event, both junior and senior. "I am just really happy that I was able to skate my best today," said Bath. "I wanted to enjoy this Junior World Championships, and I was able to do that last year as well. So, this year I wanted to perform for the crowd and show everything that I can do, and I am very happy with what I could do today."

=== 2026–27 season ===
Bath began her season in July at the Aqua Cup, where she placed second in the short program, following a fall on her opening triple Flip-triple toe combination, and first in the free skate, winning the silver medal in the junior event behind Karin Miyazaki. The next month, Bath won gold at the Kinoshita Summer Cup, placing first in both segments despite a fall on her triple flip in the free skate. Following the event, she stated in an interview that her season's goal was to qualify for the Junior Grand Prix Final.

Bath opened her season at the Junior Grand Prix in Riga, Latvia. Second in the short program to Mei Okada, Bath won the free skate and set new ISU personal bests in both segments and overall score, totalling 209.7 points and winning the gold medal. This achievement made her the first Australian figure skater to win an individual gold medal on the JGP series. Bath followed this by winning a second gold medal at the Junior Grand Prix in Slovenia. Her two gold medal results led Bath to qualify for the upcoming Junior Grand Prix Final, making her the first female Australian figure skater to do so.

== Programs ==
Competition programs by season
Season	Short program	Free skate program
2023–24	Confutatis: Composed by Wolfgang Amadeus Mozart; Choreo. by Evgueni Borounov, Maria Borounov	Yunona and Avos: Composed by Alexey Rybnikov; Choreo. by Evgueni Borounov, Maria Borounov
2024–25	Nocturnal Serenade: Performed by YOHIO; Choreo. by Evgueni Borounov, Maria Borounov	Querer: Performed by Cirque Du Soleil; Choreo. by Evgueni Borounov, Maria Borounov
2025–26	"Survivor": Performed by Destiny's Child; Choreo. by Yukako Sugita	Medley: 1. Fountain of Eternity; 2. Lullaby for Sadness; Performed by Eternal Eclipse, Bianca Ban; Choreo. by Kenji Miyamoto
2026–27	Firedance: From Riverdance; Composed by Bill Whelan	Moulin Rouge!: 1. One Day I'll Fly Away; Performed by Nicole Kidman; 2. Come What May; Performed by Nicole Kidman, Ewan McGregor

== Competitive highlights ==
- JGP – Event of the ISU Junior Grand Prix Series
- TBD – Assigned
- WD – Withdrew from competition

Competition placements at senior level
Season	2022–23	2023–24	2024–25
Australian Championships	2nd	1st	1st

Competition placements at junior level
Season	2022–23	2023–24	2024–25	2025–26	2026–27
World Junior Championships		26th	10th	2nd	
Australian Championships	1st	1st	1st		
JGP Final					TBD
JGP China			9th		
JGP Japan		6th			
JGP Latvia					1st
JGP Slovenia					1st
JGP Thailand		13th	7th	4th	
JGP United Arab Emirates				2nd	
Swan Trophy			1st		

== Detailed results ==
ISU personal best scores in the +5/-5 GOE System
Segment	Type	Score	Event
Total	**TSS**	**209.07**	2026 JGP Latvia
Short program	**TSS**	**69.06**	2026 JGP Latvia
Short program	TES	40.07	2026 JGP Latvia
Short program	PCS	28.99	2026 JGP Latvia
Free skating	**TSS**	**140.01**	2026 JGP Latvia
Free skating	TES	78.47	2026 World Junior Championships
Free skating	PCS	62.67	2026 JGP Latvia

=== Senior level ===
- Small medals for the short program and free skating are only awarded at ISU Championships.
- ISU Personal Bests highlighted in **bold**.

Results in the 2022–23 season
Date	Event	SP		FS		Total	
Date	Event	P	Score	P	Score	P	Score
Nov 25 – Dec 2, 2022	(Australia) 2022–23 Australian Championships	3	39.83	2	87.88	2	127.71

Results in the 2023-24 season
Date	Event	SP		FS		Total	
Date	Event	P	Score	P	Score	P	Score
Dec 1–8, 2023	(Australia) 2023–24 Australian Championships	2	51.03	1	110.40	1	161.43

Results in the 2024–25 season
Date	Event	SP		FS		Total	
Date	Event	P	Score	P	Score	P	Score
Nov 29 – Dec 6, 2024	(Australia) 2024–25 Australian Championships	1	60.30	1	120.80	1	181.10

=== Junior level ===
Results in the 2022–23 season
Date	Event	SP		FS		Total	
Date	Event	P	Score	P	Score	P	Score
Nov 25 – Dec 2, 2022	(Australia) 2022–23 Australian Championships	1	55.13	1	91.00	1	146.13

Results in the 2023–24 season
Date	Event	SP		FS		Total	
Date	Event	P	Score	P	Score	P	Score
Aug 23–26, 2023	2023 JGP Thailand	13	50.01	13	90.36	13	140.37
Sep 13–16, 2023	2023 JGP Japan	7	56.70	4	113.94	6	170.64
Dec 1–8, 2023	(Australia) 2023–24 Australian Championships	1	50.21	1	99.59	1	149.80
Feb 26 – Mar 3, 2024	(Taiwan) 2024 World Junior Championships	26	52.48	—N/a	—N/a	26	52.48

Results in the 2024–25 season
Date	Event	SP		FS		Total	
Date	Event	P	Score	P	Score	P	Score
Sep 11–14, 2024	2024 JGP Thailand	8	52.53	7	111.04	7	163.57
Sep 23–25, 2024	(Australia) 2024 Swan Trophy International	1	50.97	1	113.19	1	164.16
Oct 9–12, 2024	2024 JGP China	9	53.25	8	107.91	9	161.16
Nov 29 – Dec 6, 2024	(Australia) 2024–25 Australian Championships	1	60.67	1	128.82	1	189.49
Feb 25 – Mar 2, 2025	(Hungary) 2025 World Junior Championships	17	56.95	4	122.05	10	179.00

Results in the 2025–26 season
Date	Event	SP		FS		Total	
Date	Event	P	Score	P	Score	P	Score
Sep 9–13, 2025	2025 JGP Thailand	9	57.07	3	121.35	4	178.42
Oct 8–11, 2025	2025 JGP United Arab Emirates	3	62.98	2	129.74	2	192.72
Mar 3–8, 2026	(Estonia) 2026 World Junior Championships	3	66.95	1	138.44	2	205.39

Results in the 2026–27 season
Date	Event	SP		FS		Total	
Date	Event	P	Score	P	Score	P	Score
Aug 27–29, 2026	2026 JGP Latvia	2	**69.06**	1	**140.01**	1	**209.07**
Oct 1–4, 2026	2026 JGP Slovenia	2	67.75	1	131.11	1	198.86
