= Kiri Baga =

American figure skater (born 1995)

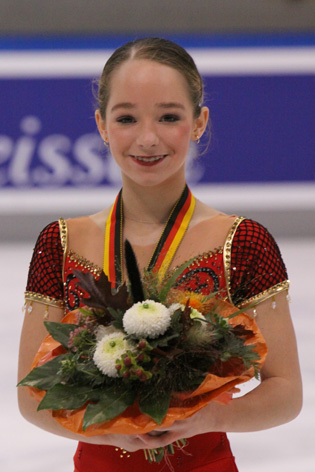
- Baga in Dresden, 2009

Personal information
- Full name: Kiri Nicole Baga
- Born: April 15, 1995 (age 31) Detroit, Michigan, U.S.
- Home town: Bloomington, Minnesota, U.S.
- Height: 5 ft 0 in (1.52 m)

Figure skating career
- Country: United States
- Skating club: FSC of Bloomington
- Began skating: 1998
- Retired: May 2014

Kiri Nicole Baga (born April 15, 1995) is an American former figure skater. She won two gold medals on the ISU Junior Grand Prix series and placed 7th at the 2010 World Junior Championships. She is the 2010 U.S. junior pewter medalist and 2009 novice national champion.

== Personal life ==
Kiri Baga was born as the youngest of five children in Detroit, Michigan. She was a student at Minnesota Connections Academy, an online school, and then studied psychology at Simmons College in Boston. In autumn 2014, she moved to the University of Pennsylvania. She is majoring in the biological basis of behavior.

== Career ==
Baga began skating when she was two and a half. She began group lessons at age four, and private lessons shortly thereafter. Early in her career, she was coached by Sue Lien. She switched to Lorie Charbonneau when she was nine. Early in her career, she represented the Duluth Figure Skating Club. She changed club representation to the FSC of Bloomington in Bloomington, Minnesota following the 2005–2006 season.

In the 2005–2006 season, Baga began competing on the juvenile level. She placed 8th at her regional championship.

In the 2006–2007 season, Baga moved up to the Intermediate level. She won the bronze medal at her regional championship, qualifying her for the 2007 U.S. Junior Championships. At the Junior Championships, she placed 3rd in her qualifying group, 4th in the short program, and 10th in the free skating to place 8th overall.

Baga moved up to the novice level in the 2007–2008 season. She placed fifth at her regional championship and did not advance to her sectional championship She remained on the novice level for the 2008–2009 season. At her regional championship, she won the short program and placed third in the free skating to win the silver medal overall. At her sectional championship, she placed 5th in the short program and won the free skating to win the competition. This win qualifier her for the 2009 U.S. Figure Skating Championships. At the U.S. Championships, she won the short program and placed second in the free skating to win the gold medal overall.

Baga moved up to the Junior level for the 2009–2010 season. She made her international debut in the 2009–2010 ISU Junior Grand Prix. At her first event, in Germany, she won the short program and placed second in the free skating to win the competition overall. Following that win, she was assigned to the event in Turkey as her second event. At that event, she won the short program. Baga was the third qualifier to the 2009–2010 ISU Junior Grand Prix Final.

Baga was named the first alternate to the US ladies team to the 2010 World Junior Championships and was added to the team after Ashley Wagner withdrew. She debuted a new long program to Maksim Mrivca's "Hana's Eyes" and Piano Concerto in A minor by Edvard Grieg.

Baga made her comeback to competition by winning the 2011 Upper Great Lakes Regional Championships.

On March 23, 2012, it was announced that Baga had teamed up with Taylor Toth to compete in senior pair skating, while continuing her singles career. In May 2014, she said she would no longer train for elite competition, deciding to focus on her education.

== Programs ==
Season	Short program	Free skating	Exhibition
2013–2014	Dark Eyes by Florian Hermann	Samson and Delilah by the Cincinnati Pops Orchestra	
2012–2013	Gabriel's Oboe (from The Mission) by Ennio Morricone	Bacchanala (from Samson and Delilah) by C. Saint-Saëns	
2011–2012	Piano Fantasy by William Joseph	La Strada by Nino Rota	
2010–2011	Danse Macabre by Camille Saint-Saëns	La Strada by Nino Rota	
2009–2010	Danse Macabre by Camille Saint-Saëns	Piano Concerto in A Minor by Edvard Grieg; Hana's Eyes performed by Maksim Mrvica; Carmen by Georges Bizet; Carmen Suite by Rodion Shchedrin	
2008–2009	Piano Concerto in A minor by Edvard Grieg	Selections by Charlie Chaplin	Smooth by Carlos Santana

== Competitive highlights ==
=== Single skating ===
International
Event	09–10	10–11	11–12	12–13	13–14
Cup of Nice					2nd
International: Junior
Junior Worlds	7th				
JGP Final	7th	WD			
JGP Czech Rep.		5th			
JGP Germany	1st				
JGP Japan		2nd			
JGP Turkey	1st				
JGP USA				5th	
National
U.S. Champ.	4th J.	WD	10th	13th	14th
J. = Junior; JGP = Junior Grand Prix; WD = Withdrew

=== Pair skating with Toth ===
International
Event	2012–13
International Challenge Cup	6th
National
U.S. Championships	8th
