= Ean Weiler =

Swiss figure skater (born 2007)

Personal information
- Born: September 12, 2007 (age 19) Winterthur, Switzerland
- Home town: Winterthur, Switzerland
- Height: 1.69 m (5 ft 7 in)

Figure skating career
- Country: Switzerland
- Discipline: Men's singles
- Coach: Stéphane Lambiel
- Skating club: Club de patineurs de Champéry
- Began skating: 2018

Medal record
Swiss Championships
| Silver medal – second place | 2026 Lugano | Singles |

Ean Weiler (born September 12, 2007) is a Swiss figure skater. He is the 2026 Swiss national silver medalist.

On the junior level, he is the 2026 JGP Georgia gold medalist, 2026 JGP Latvia bronze medalist, and the 2025 Swiss junior national champion.

== Personal life ==
Ean Weiler was born on September 12, 2007, in Winterthur, Switzerland, as the only child to mother Corinne Weiler and father Harn-Chieh Kwan who are both of Swiss nationality. He lived with his family in Wil in the Swiss canton of Zurich and attended to the local secondary school, while training in Bülach, taking skating lessons six times a week. In order to improve his performing abilities, Weiler regularly took ballet classes. In the beginning of 2024 he relocated to Champéry, Switzerland to train under Stéphane Lambiel.

== Competitive career ==
=== Early years ===
Weiler was introduced to figure skating in 2018 at the age of ten during a school trip to Schaffhausen, being inspired by the performance of a schoolmate: "She fascinated me so much that I went home and told my mother that I'd like to start skating as well." Although it is more common among figure skaters to start skating in their early childhood, Weiler managed to pass all required basic tests at his local club in a span of one year. Weiler was first coached by Mark Pepperday in Bülach, Switzerland, before switching to Ekaterina Zanta in 2019.

In May 2021, Weiler was selected for the Swiss national team in the advanced novice category and would go on to win in all domestic competitions the following season. In February 2022, he participated at the Swiss Championships for the first time, winning gold in the novice under-14 category. In April, he gave his international debut at the Egna Trophy in Italy, where he placed seventh.

During the 2022–23 season, Weiler continued to win every domestic he competed in, including the Advanced Novice Swiss Championships, an event that he won by more than 50 points.

=== 2023–24 season ===
Weiler debuted on the Junior Grand Prix circuit by finishing eighteenth at 2023 JGP Turkey. He would go on to compete at the 2023 Santa Claus Cup, where he finished fifth on the junior level. At the 2024 Swiss Junior Championships, Weiler won the silver medal. He then ended the season with a fourth-place finish at the 2024 Bavarian Open.

In May 2024, Weiler moved to Champéry, where Stéphane Lambiel became his new coach.

=== 2024–25 season ===
Weiler began the season by competing on the 2024–25 ISU Junior Grand Prix series, finishing fourth at 2024 JGP Turkey and eleventh at 2024 JGP Slovenia. He then went on to win gold on the junior level at the 2024 Tallinn Trophy.

In early December, Weiler won the 2025 Swiss junior national title. Selected to compete at the 2025 World Junior Championships in Debrecen, Hungary, Weiler finished in twenty-fourth place.

=== 2025–26 season ===
Weiler started the season by competing on the Junior Grand Prix circuit, finishing eighth at 2025 JGP Latvia and seventh at 2025 JGP Poland. Between the two events, Weiler made his senior international debut at the 2025 Crystal Skate Open, winning the silver medal. He followed this up with a fourth-place finish at the 2025 Swiss Open.

Weiler went on to compete on the 2025–26 Challenger Series, finishing seventh at the 2025 CS Warsaw Cup and eleventh at the 2025 CS Tallinn Trophy.

In December, he made his senior national debut at the 2026 Swiss Championships, winning the silver medal behind Lukas Britschgi. Selected to compete at the 2026 European Championships in Sheffield, England, United Kingdom, Weiler finished the event in twenty-first place. Following that in January, he placed second as a senior on the Bavarian Open 2026.

=== 2026–27 season ===
Weiler began the season by competing on the 2026–27 ISU Junior Grand Prix series, finishing third at JGP in Latvia. Subsequently, he went onto win gold at the JGP in Georgia; the first Junior Grand Prix gold medal for Swiss men since Jamal Othman in 2004.

== Skating style and influences ==
Weiler's figure skating idol is two-time Olympic champion Yuzuru Hanyu from Japan who influenced Weiler in his skating style, which notably features some of Hanyu's signature moves, including the Ina Bauer, hydroblading, and the side lunge. Since 2022, Weiler's costumes are made by Japanese designer Satomi Ito who has been in charge of Hanyu's costumes since the 2014–15 season. Being asked about his favorite element in figure skating, Weiler noted his personal preference for jumps.

== Programs ==
| Season | Short program | Free skating |
|---|---|---|
| 2020–21 | Feeling Good by Anthony Newley & Leslie Bricusse performed by Michael Bublé choreo. by Ekaterina Zanta | Now We Are Free (from Gladiator) by Hans Zimmer performed by 2Cellos choreo. by Ekaterina Zanta |
| 2021–22 | Feeling Good by Anthony Newley & Leslie Bricusse performed by Michael Bublé choreo. by Ekaterina Zanta | Now We Are Free (from Gladiator) by Hans Zimmer performed by 2Cellos choreo. by Ekaterina Zanta |
| 2022–23 | Feeling Good by Anthony Newley & Leslie Bricusse performed by Michael Bublé choreo. by Ekaterina Zanta | Nothing Else Matters by Metallica performed by Luka Šulić choreo. by Ekaterina Zanta |
| 2023–24 | Earth Song by Michael Jackson performed by Amadeus Electric Quartett & Xenti Runceanu choreo. by Ekaterina Zanta | S.O.S. d'un terrien en détresse (from Starmania) by Michel Berger & Luc Plamondon performed by Dimash Qudaibergen choreo. by Ekaterina Zanta |
| 2024–25 | Lose Control by Teddy Swims choreo. by Stéphane Lambiel | S.O.S. d'un terrien en détresse (from Starmania) by Michel Berger & Luc Plamondon performed by Dimash Qudaibergen choreo. by Ekaterina Zanta |
| 2025–26 | Watergun by Remo Forrer choreo. by Stéphane Lambiel | RAIN by Tony Ann; Enemy of Truth (from The Devil Judge) by Jung Se-rin choreo. by Stéphane Lambiel |
| 2026–27 | Tuyo (from Narcos) by Rodrigo Amarante; Ameksa by Taalbi Brothers | Evermore (from Beauty and the Beast) by Alan Menken & Tim Rice performed by Josh Groban |

== Competitive highlights ==
- JGP – Event of the ISU Junior Grand Prix Series
- CS – Event of the ISU Challenger Series
- TBD – Assigned
- WD – Withdrew from competition

Competition placements at senior level
| Season | 2025–26 |
|---|---|
| European Championships | 21st |
| Swiss Championships | 2nd |
| CS Tallinn Trophy | 11th |
| CS Warsaw Cup | 7th |
| Crystal Skate Open | 2nd |
| Swiss Open | 4th |
| Tayside Trophy | 3rd |

Competition placements at junior level
| Season | 2023–24 | 2024–25 | 2025–26 | 2026–27 |
|---|---|---|---|---|
| World Junior Championships | | 24th | 15th | |
| Swiss Championship | 2nd | 1st | | |
| JGP Georgia | | | | 1st |
| JGP Latvia | | | 8th | 3rd |
| JGP Poland | | | 7th | |
| JGP Slovenia | | 11th | | |
| JGP Turkey | 18th | 4th | | |
| Bavarian Open | 4th | | | |
| Daugava Open Cup | | 1st | | |
| Santa Claus Cup | 5th | | | |
| Tallinn Trophy | | 1st | | |

== Detailed results ==
ISU personal best scores in the +5/-5 GOE System
| Segment | Type | Score | Event |
|---|---|---|---|
| Total | TSS | 221.73 | 2026 JGP Latvia |
| Short program | TSS | 81.17 | 2026 JGP Georgia |
| Short program | TES | 45.27 | 2026 JGP Georgia |
| Short program | PCS | 35.90 | 2026 JGP Georgia |
| Free skating | TSS | 143.99 | 2026 JGP Latvia |
| Free skating | TES | 71.46 | 2026 JGP Latvia |
| Free skating | PCS | 73.73 | 2026 JGP Georgia |

=== Senior level ===
Results in the 2025–26 season
| Date | Event | SP | | FS | | Total | |
| Date | Event | P | Score | P | Score | P | Score |
|---|---|---|---|---|---|---|---|
| Sep 25–28, 2025 | (Estonia) 2025 Crystal Skate Open | 2 | 65.25 | 2 | 130.65 | 2 | 195.90 |
| Oct 23–26, 2025 | (Switzerland) 2025 Swiss Open | 5 | 65.02 | 4 | 124.67 | 4 | 189.69 |
| Nov 19–23, 2025 | (Poland) 2025 CS Warsaw Cup | 11 | 63.06 | 6 | 136.39 | 7 | 199.45 |
| Nov 25–30, 2025 | (Estonia) 2025 CS Tallinn Trophy | 16 | 62.08 | 11 | 128.85 | 11 | 190.93 |
| Dec 19–21, 2025 | (Switzerland) 2026 Swiss Championships | 2 | 77.65 | 3 | 133.98 | 2 | 211.63 |
| Jan 13–18, 2026 | (United Kingdom) 2026 European Championships | 15 | 68.92 | 22 | 121.71 | 21 | 190.63 |
| Jan 27–Feb 1, 2026 | (Germany) 2026 Bavarian Open | 4 | 64.35 | 1 | 142.24 | 2 | 206.59 |

=== Junior level ===
Results in the 2023–24 season
| Date | Event | SP | | FS | | Total | |
| Date | Event | P | Score | P | Score | P | Score |
|---|---|---|---|---|---|---|---|
| Sep 6–9, 2023 | 2023 JGP Turkey | 18 | 47.91 | 16 | 103.12 | 18 | 151.03 |
| Nov 29–Dec 4, 2023 | (Hungary) 2023 Santa Claus Cup | 4 | 55.60 | 5 | 100.70 | 5 | 156.30 |
| Dec 15–17, 2024 | (Switzerland) 2024 Swiss Championships | 3 | 49.66 | 2 | 104.82 | 2 | 154.48 |
| Jan 30–Feb 4, 2024 | (Germany) 2024 Bavarian Open | 5 | 57.60 | 3 | 112.65 | 4 | 170.25 |

Results in the 2024–25 season
| Date | Event | SP | | FS | | Total | |
| Date | Event | P | Score | P | Score | P | Score |
|---|---|---|---|---|---|---|---|
| Sep 18–21, 2024 | 2024 JGP Turkey | 4 | 67.93 | 4 | 127.59 | 4 | 195.52 |
| Oct 2–5, 2024 | 2024 JGP Slovenia | 8 | 66.04 | 11 | 119.29 | 11 | 185.33 |
| Nov 12–17, 2024 | (Estonia) 2024 Tallinn Trophy | 1 | 61.66 | 1 | 127.84 | 1 | 189.50 |
| Dec 13–15, 2024 | (Switzerland) 2025 Swiss Championships | 1 | 64.16 | 1 | 122.10 | 1 | 186.26 |
| Feb 25–Mar 2, 2025 | (Hungary) 2025 World Junior Championships | 16 | 68.19 | 24 | 89.79 | 24 | 157.98 |

Results in the 2025–26 season
| Date | Event | SP | | FS | | Total | |
| Date | Event | P | Score | P | Score | P | Score |
|---|---|---|---|---|---|---|---|
| Aug 20–23, 2025 | 2025 JGP Latvia | 9 | 61.26 | 7 | 128.72 | 8 | 189.98 |
| Oct 1–24, 2025 | 2025 JGP Poland | 5 | 72.30 | 7 | 128.60 | 7 | 200.90 |
| Mar 3–8, 2026 | (Estonia) 2026 World Junior Championships | 8 | 76.77 | 19 | 122.14 | 15 | 198.91 |

Results in the 2026–27 season
| Date | Event | SP | | FS | | Total | |
| Date | Event | P | Score | P | Score | P | Score |
|---|---|---|---|---|---|---|---|
| Aug 27–29, 2026 | 2026 JGP Latvia | 4 | 77.74 | 3 | 143.99 | 3 | 221.73 |
| Sep 24–26, 2026 | (Georgia (country)) 2026 JGP Georgia | 2 | 81.17 | 2 | 140.55 | 1 | 221.72 |
