= Ivan Morozov =

Ivan Morozov may refer to:

- Ivan Morozov (businessman) (1871–1921), Russian businessman and art collector
- Ivan Morozov (ice hockey) (born. 2000), Russian ice hockey player
- Ivan Morozov (major general) (1905–1979), Russian Red Army general
- Ivan Morozov (entrepreneur) (1865–1933), Russian businessman
