= Chinese Figure Skating Association =

Sports governing body in China

The Chinese Figure Skating Association (Chinese: 中国花样滑冰协会), a member of the All-China Sports Federation, complies with the business guidance and supervision of the State General Administration of Sports and the Ministry of Civil Affairs of China, the association's registration authority. It is the sole legal organization that represents China in international figure skating events.

== History ==
The Chinese Figure Skating Association was formally established on December 14, 2017, with Shen Xue serving as the association's president, and figure skating was declared independent from the China Skating Association by the Winter Sports Management Center of the State General Administration of Sports.
