= ISU Junior Grand Prix in China =

International figure skating competition

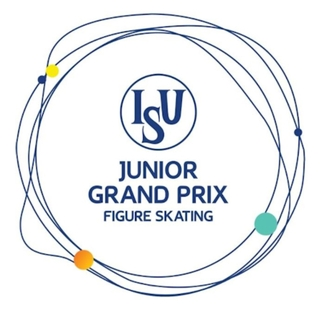
- Status: Active
- Genre: ISU Junior Grand Prix
- Frequency: Occasional
- Country: China
- Inaugurated: 1998
- Most recent: 2026
- Organizer: Chinese Figure Skating Association

The ISU Junior Grand Prix in China is an international figure skating competition sanctioned by the International Skating Union (ISU), organized and hosted by the Chinese Figure Skating Association (Chinese: 中国花样滑冰协会). It is held periodically as an event of the ISU Junior Grand Prix of Figure Skating (JGP), a series of international competitions exclusively for junior-level skaters. Medals may be awarded in men's singles, women's singles, pair skating, and ice dance. Skaters earn points based on their results at the qualifying competitions each season, and the top skaters or teams in each discipline are invited to then compete at the Junior Grand Prix of Figure Skating Final.

== History ==
The ISU Junior Grand Prix of Figure Skating (JGP) was established by the International Skating Union (ISU) in 1997 and consists of a series of seven international figure skating competitions exclusively for junior-level skaters. The locations of the Junior Grand Prix events change every year. While all seven competitions feature the men's, women's, and ice dance events, only four competitions each season feature the pairs event. Skaters earn points based on their results each season, and the top skaters or teams in each discipline are then invited to compete at the Junior Grand Prix of Figure Skating Final.

Skaters are eligible to compete on the junior-level circuit if they are at least 13 years old before 1 July of the respective season, but not yet 19 (for single skaters), 21 (for men and women in ice dance and women in pair skating), or 23 (for men in pair skating). The skaters are not allowed an age gap of more than 7 years if they are in pairs. Competitors are chosen by their respective skating federations. The number of entries allotted to each ISU member nation in each discipline is determined by their results at the prior World Junior Figure Skating Championships.

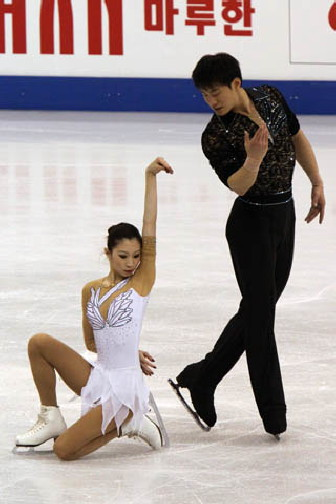
Zhang Dan and Zhang Hao of China, three-time champions in pair skating at the Junior Grand Prix in China

China hosted its first Junior Grand Prix competition in 1998. Guo Zhengxin of China won the men's event, Yoshie Onda of Japan won the women's event, Zhang Dan and Zhang Hao of China won the pairs event, and Flavia Ottaviani and Massimo Scali of Italy won the ice dance event.

China has twice hosted the Junior Grand Prix of Figure Skating Final, the culminating event of the Junior Grand Prix series. The 2010 Junior Grand Prix Final was held at the Capital Indoor Stadium in Beijing. Richard Dornbush of the United States won the men's event, Adelina Sotnikova of Russia won the women's event, Narumi Takahashi and Mervin Tran of Japan won the pairs event, and Ksenia Monko and Kirill Khaliavin of Russia won the ice dance event. China was scheduled to host the 2020 Junior Grand Prix Final, again in Beijing, but the ISU cancelled all scheduled Junior Grand Prix events for the 2020–21 season due to the COVID-19 pandemic, citing increased travel and entry requirements between countries and potentially excessive sanitary and health care costs for those hosting competitions. China was able to host the 2023 Junior Grand Prix Final at the National Indoor Stadium in Beijing. Rio Nakata and Mao Shimada, both of Japan, won the men's and women's event, respectively; while Anastasiia Metelkina and Luka Berulava of Georgia won the pairs event, and Leah Neset and Artem Markelov of the United States won the ice dance event.

The seventh event of the 2024 Junior Grand Prix Series was originally scheduled to be held in Épinal, France, but the French Federation of Ice Sports withdrew; their spot was re-allocated to the Chinese Figure Skating Association, who held the event in Wuxi. On 30 June 2026, the ISU announced that figure skaters from Russia and Belarus would be allowed to compete at international competitions as Individual Neutral Athletes (AINs). Each skater was required to undergo an individual assessment conducted by the ISU Council to determine whether they met the criteria for neutral status. These requirements included having not previously taken active part in the Russian war in Ukraine, as well as having not actively and publicly supported the war. As AINs, Russian and Belarusian skaters were required to compete without items of state recognition such as their national flags or anthems. The 2026 event in Xi'an was the competition's most recent iteration.

== Medalists ==
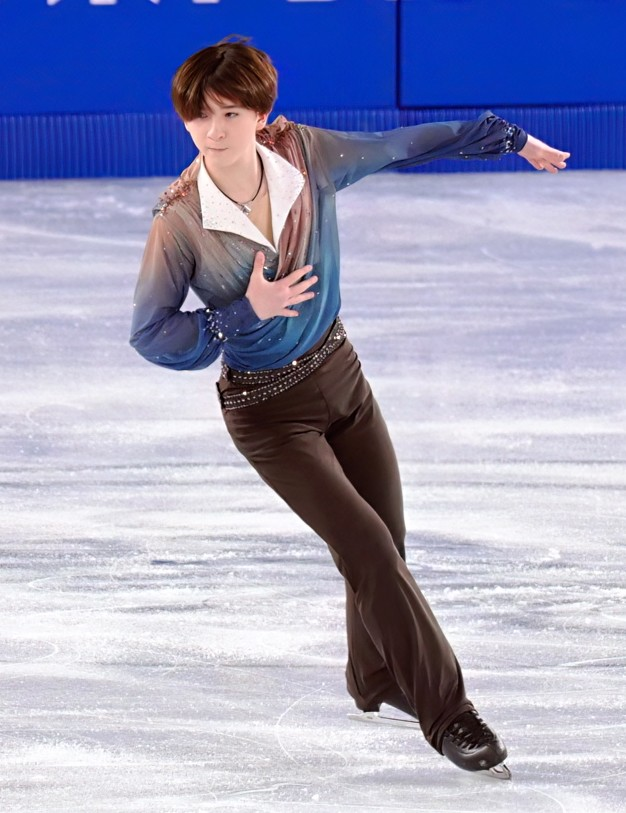
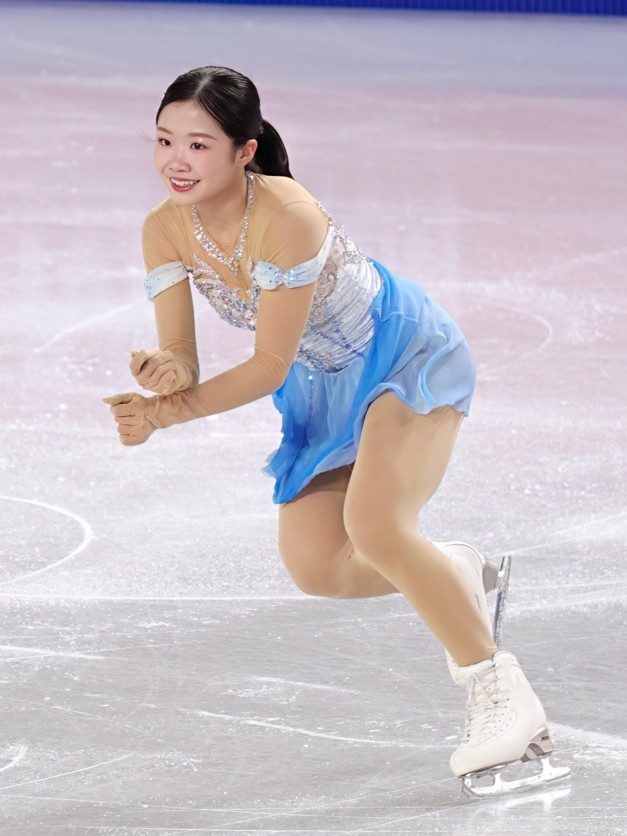
The 2024 Grand Prix in China champions: Rio Nakata of Japan (men's singles) and Ami Nakai of Japan (women's singles)
Not pictured: Elliana Peal and Ethan Peal of the United States (ice dance)

=== Men's singles ===
Men's event medalists
Year	Location	Gold	Silver	Bronze	Ref.
1998	Beijing	(China) Guo Zhengxin	(China) Gao Song	(China) Yu Wang	
2000	Harbin	(China) Ma Xiaodong	(United States) Johnny Weir	(China) Ma Yingdi	
2002	Beijing	(Russia) Mikhail Magerovski	(China) Rui Yi	(China) Wu Jialiang	
2004	Harbin	(Russia) Mikhail Magerovski	(Switzerland) Jamal Othman	(Japan) Kazumi Kishimoto	
2010 Final	Beijing	(United States) Richard Dornbush	(China) Yan Han	(Canada) Andrei Rogozine	
2020 Final	Beijing	Competition cancelled due to the COVID-19 pandemic			
2023 Final	Beijing	(Japan) Rio Nakata	(South Korea) Kim Hyun-gyeom	(Slovakia) Adam Hagara	
2024	Wuxi	(Japan) Rio Nakata	(China) Tian Tonghe	(New Zealand) Yanhao Li	
2026	Xi'an	(Individual Neutral Athletes) Lev Lazarev	(New Zealand) Yanhao Li	(Japan) Daiya Ebihara	

=== Women's singles ===
Women's event medalists
Year	Location	Gold	Silver	Bronze	Ref.
1998	Beijing	(Japan) Yoshie Onda	(France) Gwenaëlle Jullien	(China) Wang Huan	
2000	Harbin	(Japan) Yukari Nakano	(Canada) Marianne Dubuc	(Australia) Stephanie Zhang	
2002	Beijing	(Japan) Miki Ando	(United States) Beatrisa Liang	(United States) Yebin Mok	
2004	Harbin	(Japan) Nana Takeda	(South Korea) Yuna Kim	(Canada) Jessica Dubé	
2010 Final	Beijing	(Russia) Adelina Sotnikova	(Russia) Elizaveta Tuktamysheva	(China) Li Zijun	
2020 Final	Beijing	Competition cancelled due to the COVID-19 pandemic			
2023 Final	Beijing	(Japan) Mao Shimada	(South Korea) Shin Ji-a	(Japan) Rena Uezono	
2024	Wuxi	(Japan) Ami Nakai	(South Korea) Kim Yu-seong	(China) Wang Yihan	
2026	Xi'an	(Individual Neutral Athletes) Sofia Dzepka	(China) Yuxuan Liu	(China) Shuxian Jin	

=== Pairs ===
Pairs event medalists
Year	Location	Gold	Silver	Bronze	Ref.
1998	Beijing	(China); Zhang Dan; Zhang Hao	(Russia); Melica Brozovich; Anton Nimenko	(Russia); Anna Kaverzina; Vitali Dubina	
2000	Harbin	(China); Zhang Dan; Zhang Hao	(China); Ding Yang; Ren Zhongfei	(Japan); Yuko Kawaguchi; Alexander Markuntsov	
2002	Beijing	(China); Zhang Dan; Zhang Hao	(United States); Tiffany Vise; Laureano Ibarra	(Russia); Tatiana Kokoreva; Egor Golovkin	
2004	Harbin	(Russia); Maria Mukhortova; Maxim Trankov	(Canada); Jessica Dubé; Bryce Davison	(Russia); Elena Efaieva; Alexei Menshikov	
2010 Final	Beijing	(Japan); Narumi Takahashi; Mervin Tran	(Russia); Ksenia Stolbova; Fedor Klimov	(China); Yu Xiaoyu; Jin Yang	
2020 Final	Beijing	Competition cancelled due to the COVID-19 pandemic			
2023 Final	Beijing	(Georgia (country)); Anastasiia Metelkina; Luka Berulava	(Canada); Ava Kemp; Yohnatan Elizarov	(Canada); Jazmine Desrochers; Kieran Thrasher	
2024	Wuxi	No pairs competition			
2026	Xi'an	(Individual Neutral Athletes); Polina Shesheleva; Egor Karnaukhov	(China); Chen Yuxuan; Dong Yinbo	(China); Wang Chen Ling; Chen Yong Zheng	

=== Ice dance ===
Ice dance event medalists
Year	Location	Gold	Silver	Bronze	Ref.
1998	Beijing	(Italy); Flavia Ottaviani; Massimo Scali	(United States); Melissa Gregory; James Shufford	(France); Nelly Gourvest; Cédric Pernet	
2000	Harbin	(United States); Kendra Goodwin; Chris Obzansky	(France); Nathalie Péchalat; Fabian Bourzat	(Canada); Catherine Perreault; Charles Perreault	
2002	Beijing	(Germany); Christina Beier; William Beier	(Russia); Ekaterina Rubleva; Ivan Shefer	(United States); Loren Galler-Rabinowitz; David Mitchell	
2004	Harbin	(Canada); Tessa Virtue; Scott Moir	(Russia); Natalia Mikhailova; Arkadi Sergeev	(United States); Trina Pratt; Todd Gilles	
2010 Final	Beijing	(Russia); Ksenia Monko; Kirill Khaliavin	(Russia); Victoria Sinitsina; Ruslan Zhiganshin	(Russia); Alexandra Stepanova; Ivan Bukin	
2020 Final	Beijing	Competition cancelled due to the COVID-19 pandemic			
2023 Final	Beijing	(United States); Leah Neset; Artem Markelov	(Israel); Elizabeth Tkachenko; Alexei Kiliakov	(Germany); Darya Grimm; Michail Savitskiy	
2024	Wuxi	(United States); Elliana Peal; Ethan Peal	(France); Ambre Perrier Gianesini; Samuel Blanc Klaperman	(Canada); Chloe Nguyen; Brendan Giang	
2026	Xi'an	(Individual Neutral Athletes); Mariia Fefelova; Artem Valov	(Italy); Zoe Bianchi; Daniel Basile	(Canada); Summer Homick; Nicholas Buelow	
