= Daiya Ebihara =

Japanese figure skater (born 2008)

Personal information
- Born: 27 August 2008 (age 18) Tokyo, Japan
- Height: 1.69 m (5 ft 6 1/2 in)

Figure skating career
- Country: Japan
- Coach: Koji Okajima
- Skating club: Seisa International Komaba Gakuen High School
- Began skating: 2017

Daiya Ebihara (西海老原大也, Ebihara Daiya; born 27 August 2008) is a Japanese figure skater.

== Career ==
=== 2023–24: First Junior Grand Prix medals ===
In his first season of JGP competition, he came third in both the JGP Poland and JGP Turkey.

=== 2025–27: Medaling in the Japanese Championship and first JGP win ===
In the 2025–26 figure skating season he competed in the 2025–26 Japan Junior Figure Skating Championships and achieved his maiden medal in a national championship, coming bronze.

His final year in the category, the 2026–27 season, was his best yet. Ebihara won his first Junior Grand Prix event in Turkey, and got on the final step of the podium in China.

== Competitive highlights ==
- JGP – Event of the ISU Junior Grand Prix
- TBD – Assigned

Competition placements at senior level
Season	2023–24	2024–25	2025–26	2026–27
Japan Championships	19th	19th	7th	

Competition placements at junior level
Season	2022–23	2023–24	2024–25	2025–26	2026–27
World Junior Championships				9th	
Japan Championships	28th	7th	8th	3rd	3rd
JGP Turkey		3rd			1st
JGP Poland		3rd		4th	
JGP Czech Republic			5th		
JGP Thailand				4th	
JGP China					3rd
Tokyo Regional Championships	5th	3rd			
Eastern Section Championships	4th	3rd			
