= Lev Lazarev =

Russian figure skater (born 2009)

Personal information
- Native name: Лев Дмитриевич Лазарев
- Full name: Lev Dmitrievich Lazarev
- Born: 1 November 2009 (age 16) Moscow, Russia
- Home town: Zelenograd, Russia

Figure skating career
- Country: (Individual Neutral Athletes) Individual Neutral Athlete; Russia
- Discipline: Men's singles
- Coach: Sergei Davydov; Aleksandra Kravtsova

Lev Dmitrievich Lazarev (Russian: Лев Дмитриевич Лазарев; born 1 November 2009) is a Russian figure skater who currently competes as an Individual Neutral Athlete. He is the 2025 and 2026 Russian junior national champion and the 2023 and 2024 silver medalist and the 2024, 2025 and 2026 Russian Junior Grand Prix Final champion. Internationally, he is a two-time Junior Grand Prix champion.

== Early life ==
Lev Lazarev was born 1 November 2009 in Zelenograd. His parents were never professional athletes, though his father is an amateur marathon runner.

== Career ==
=== Early career ===
Lazarev made his first appearance in competition as a junior skater in the 2022–23 season; winning the silver medal at his Junior Championship debut. He later notably became a two-time junior national champion (2025, 2026).

=== 2025–2026 season ===
In the autumn of 2025, he won two Russian Junior Grand Prix stages, in Moscow and Krasnoyarsk, thus earning a spot in the main tournaments of the season.

In February, Lazarev won the 2026 Russian Junior Figure Skating Championships. Following this, in March, he won the 2026 Russian Junior Grand Prix Final.

On 30 June 2026, the International Skating Union announced that figure skaters from Russia and Belarus would be allowed to compete at international competitions as Individual Neutral Athletes (AINs) after having previously been banned from international events due to Russia's full-scale invasion of Ukraine in 2022. Each of these skaters are required to undergo an individual assessment conducted by the ISU Council to determine whether they meet the criteria for neutral status. Lazarev's application was approved, making him eligible to compete internationally as a neutral athlete.

=== 2026–2027 season: International junior debut ===
Lazarev debuted internationally at the 2026 Junior Grand Prix in China, winning the gold medal after placing first in both the short program and the free skate. Following this, Lazarev additionally won the Junior Grand Prix stage in Thailand, thus, qualifying for the Final due to take place in December in Chongqing.

== Programs ==
| Season | Short program | Free skating | Exhibition |
|---|---|---|---|
| 2026–2027 | Bolero by Trailerized; Prequel by Universal Production Music | Leda; Processional; Presto You Are Mine by Ezio Bosso | |

== Competitive highlights ==
=== Skating as an Individual Neutral Athlete ===
Competition placements at junior level
| Season | 2026–27 |
|---|---|
| JGP Final | TBD |
| JGP Thailand | 1st |
| JGP China | 1st |

=== Skating for Russia ===
Competition placements at junior level
| Season | 2022–23 | 2023–24 | 2024–25 | 2025–26 |
|---|---|---|---|---|
| Russian Championships | 2nd | 2nd | 1st | 1st |

== Detailed results ==
ISU personal best scores in the +5/-5 GOE System
| Segment | Type | Score | Event |
|---|---|---|---|
| Total | TSS | 260.90 | 2026 JGP Thailand |
| Short program | TSS | 86.76 | 2026 JGP China |
| Short program | TES | 48.65 | 2026 JGP China |
| Short program | PCS | 38.14 | 2026 JGP Thailand |
| Free skating | TSS | 174.43 | 2026 JGP Thailand |
| Free skating | TES | 98.94 | 2026 JGP Thailand |
| Free skating | PCS | 75.49 | 2026 JGP Thailand |

=== Skating as an Individual Neutral Athlete ===
Results in the 2026–27 season
| Date | Event | SP | | FS | | Total | |
| Date | Event | P | Score | P | Score | P | Score |
|---|---|---|---|---|---|---|---|
| 20–22 Aug, 2026 | 2026 JGP China | 1 | 86.76 | 1 | 163.45 | 1 | 250.21 |
| 3–5 Sept, 2026 | 2026 JGP Thailand | 2 | 86.47 | 1 | 174.43 | 1 | 260.90 |

=== Skating for Russia ===
==== Senior level ====
Results in the 2026–27 season
| Date | Event | SP | | FS | | Total | |
| Date | Event | P | Score | P | Score | P | Score |
|---|---|---|---|---|---|---|---|
| Oct 22–26, 2026 | (Russia) 2026 Russian Grand Prix Stage, St. Petersburg | 8 | 81.51 | 4 | 184.91 | 6 | 266.42 |

==== Junior level ====
Results in the 2025–26 season
| Date | Event | SP | | FS | | Total | |
| Date | Event | P | Score | P | Score | P | Score |
|---|---|---|---|---|---|---|---|
| Oct 14-17, 2025 | (Russia) 2025 Russian Grand Prix I, Moscow | 1 | 82.44 | 1 | 181.65 | 1 | 264.09 |
| Oct 30- Nov 1, 2025 | (Russia) 2025 Russian Grand Prix III, Kazan | 1 | 83.70 | 1 | 161.59 | 1 | 245.29 |
| Feb 4-8, 2026 | (Russia) 2026 Russian Junior Championships | 1 | 85.88 | 1 | 192.35 | 1 | 278.23 |
| March 4-6, 2026 | (Russia) 2026 Russian Junior Grand Prix Final | 1 | 85.36 | 1 | 193.89 | 1 | 279.25 |

Results in the 2024–25 season
| Date | Event | SP | | FS | | Total | |
| Date | Event | P | Score | P | Score | P | Score |
|---|---|---|---|---|---|---|---|
| Oct 1-5, 2024 | (Russia) 2024 Panin Kolomenkin Memorial | 2 | 87.07 | 1 | 178.71 | 2 | 265.78 |
| Oct 10-13, 2024 | (Russia) 2024 Russian Grand Prix I, Moscow | 1 | 85.98 | 1 | 172.42 | 1 | 258.40 |
| Nov 6-8, 2024 | (Russia) 2024 Russian Grand Prix IV, Krasnoyarsk | 1 | 86.19 | 1 | 178.63 | 1 | 264.82 |
| Feb 5-9, 2025 | (Russia) 2025 Russian Junior Championships | 1 | 87.23 | 1 | 171.57 | 1 | 258.80 |
| Feb 27- March 2, 2025 | (Russia) 2025 Russian Junior Grand Prix Final | 1 | 87.16 | 8 | 147.49 | 3 | 234.65 |

Results in the 2023–24 season
| Date | Event | SP | | FS | | Total | |
| Date | Event | P | Score | P | Score | P | Score |
|---|---|---|---|---|---|---|---|
| Nov 8-11, 2023 | (Russia) 2023 Russian Grand Prix IV, Kazan | 2 | 84.54 | 6 | 145.91 | 5 | 230.45 |
| Nov 23-25, 2023 | (Russia) 2023 Russian Grand Prix VI, Moscow | 1 | 84.84 | 1 | 188.72 | 1 | 273.56 |
| Feb 5-9, 2024 | (Russia) 2024 Russian Junior Championships | 5 | 79.03 | 2 | 180.25 | 2 | 259.28 |
| March 13-16, 2024 | (Russia) 2024 Russian Junior Grand Prix Final | 1 | 89.46 | 1 | 196.01 | 1 | 285.47 |

Results in the 2022–23 season
| Date | Event | SP | | FS | | Total | |
| Date | Event | P | Score | P | Score | P | Score |
|---|---|---|---|---|---|---|---|
| Oct 26-28, 2022 | (Russia) 2022 Russian Grand Prix II, Sochi | 1 | 84.79 | 1 | 172.71 | 1 | 257.50 |
| Nov 16-18, 2022 | (Russia) 2022 Russian Grand Prix V, Samara | 2 | 84.92 | 2 | 155.84 | 2 | 240.76 |
| Feb 14-18, 2023 | (Russia) 2023 Russian Junior Championships | 2 | 85.69 | 2 | 177.81 | 2 | 263.50 |
| March 1-3, 2023 | (Russia) 2023 Russian Junior Grand Prix Final | 5 | 79.11 | 4 | 168.68 | 4 | 247.79 |
