= ISU Junior Grand Prix in Turkey =

International figure skating competition

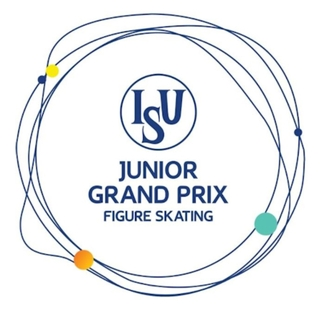
- Status: Active
- Genre: ISU Junior Grand Prix
- Frequency: Occasional
- Country: Turkey
- Inaugurated: 2009
- Previous event: 2026
- Next event: 2027
- Organizer: Turkish Ice Skating Federation

The ISU Junior Grand Prix in Turkey is an international figure skating competition sanctioned by the International Skating Union (ISU), organized and hosted by the Turkish Ice Skating Federation (Turkish: Türkiye Buz Pateni Federasyonu). It is held periodically as an event of the ISU Junior Grand Prix of Figure Skating (JGP), a series of international competitions exclusively for junior-level skaters. Medals may be awarded in men's singles, women's singles, pair skating, and ice dance. Skaters earn points based on their results at the qualifying competitions each season, and the top skaters or teams in each discipline are invited to then compete at the Junior Grand Prix of Figure Skating Final.

== History ==
The ISU Junior Grand Prix of Figure Skating (JGP) was established by the International Skating Union (ISU) in 1997 and consists of a series of seven international figure skating competitions exclusively for junior-level skaters. The locations of the Junior Grand Prix events change every year. While all seven competitions feature the men's, women's, and ice dance events, only four competitions each season feature the pairs event. Skaters earn points based on their results each season, and the top skaters or teams in each discipline are then invited to compete at the Junior Grand Prix of Figure Skating Final.

Skaters are eligible to compete on the junior-level circuit if they are at least 13 years old before 1 July of the respective season, but not yet 19 (for single skaters), 21 (for men and women in ice dance and women in pair skating), or 23 (for men in pair skating). Competitors are chosen by their respective skating federations. The number of entries allotted to each ISU member nation in each discipline is determined by their results at the prior World Junior Figure Skating Championships.

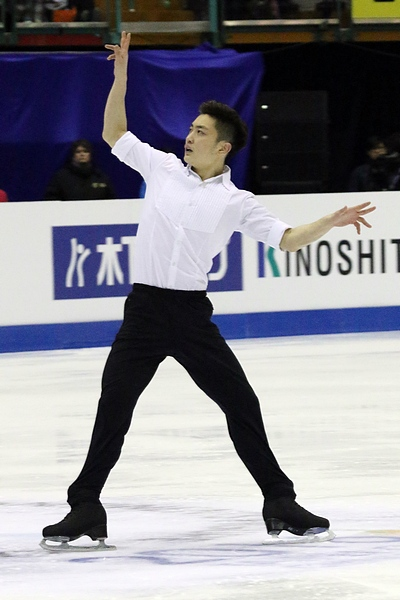
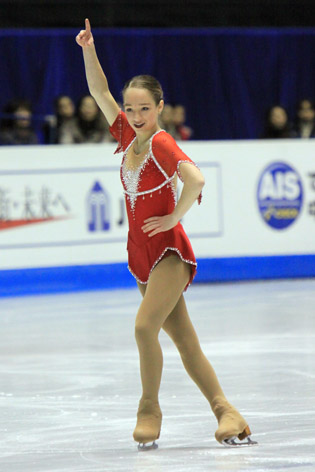
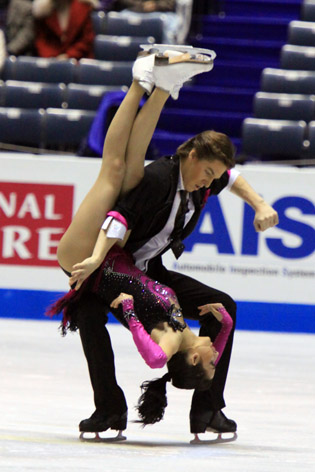
The 2009 Junior Grand Prix in Turkey champions: Yan Han of China (men's singles); Kiri Baga of the United States (women's singles), and Ksenia Monko and Kirill Khaliavin of Russia (ice dance)

Turkey hosted its first Junior Grand Prix competition in 2009 in Istanbul. Yan Han of China won the men's event, Kiri Baga of the United States won the women's event, and Ksenia Monko and Kirill Khaliavin of Russia won the ice dance event.

Turkey has hosted this event four additional times: in 2012 and 2023 in Istanbul, and in 2024, 2025, and 2026 in Ankara. On 30 June 2026, the ISU announced that figure skaters from Russia and Belarus would be allowed to compete at international competitions as Individual Neutral Athletes (AINs). Each skater was required to undergo an individual assessment conducted by the ISU Council to determine whether they met the criteria for neutral status, which included having not previously taken active part in the Russian war in Ukraine, as well as not having actively or publicly supported the war. As AINs, Russian and Belarusian skaters were not permitted to compete under their national flags or anthems. The gold and silver medalists in the pairs event in 2026 were both AINs from Russia.

Turkey is scheduled to host a Junior Grand Prix event in Ankara in August 2027.

== Medalists ==
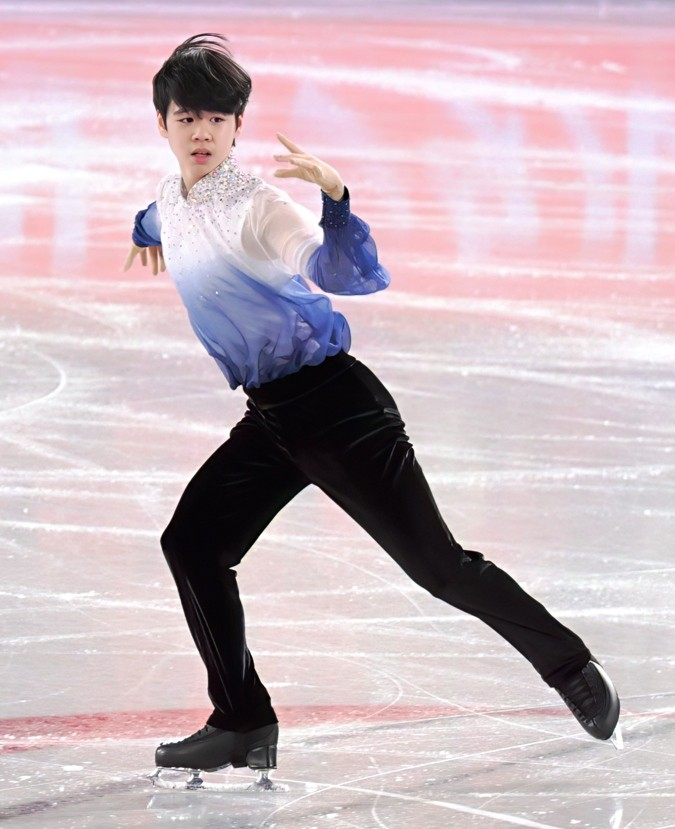
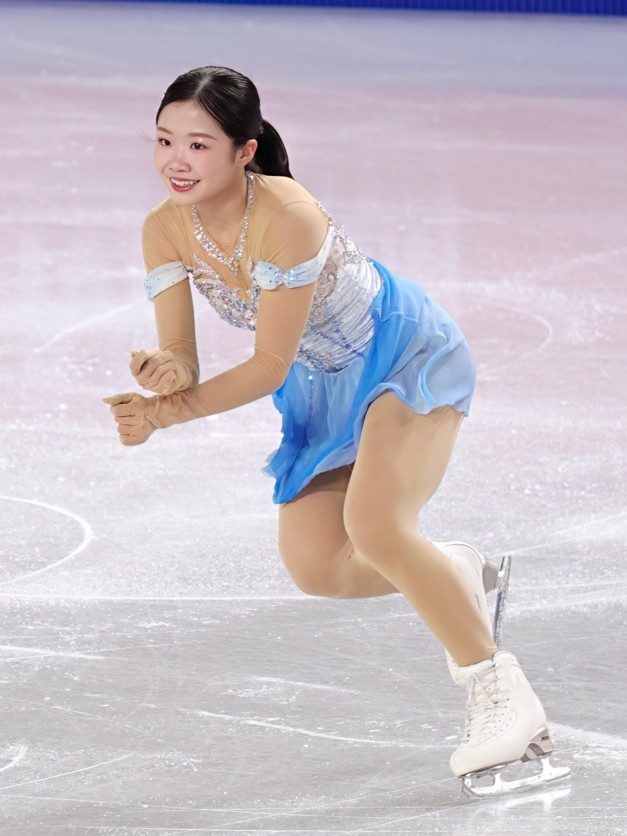
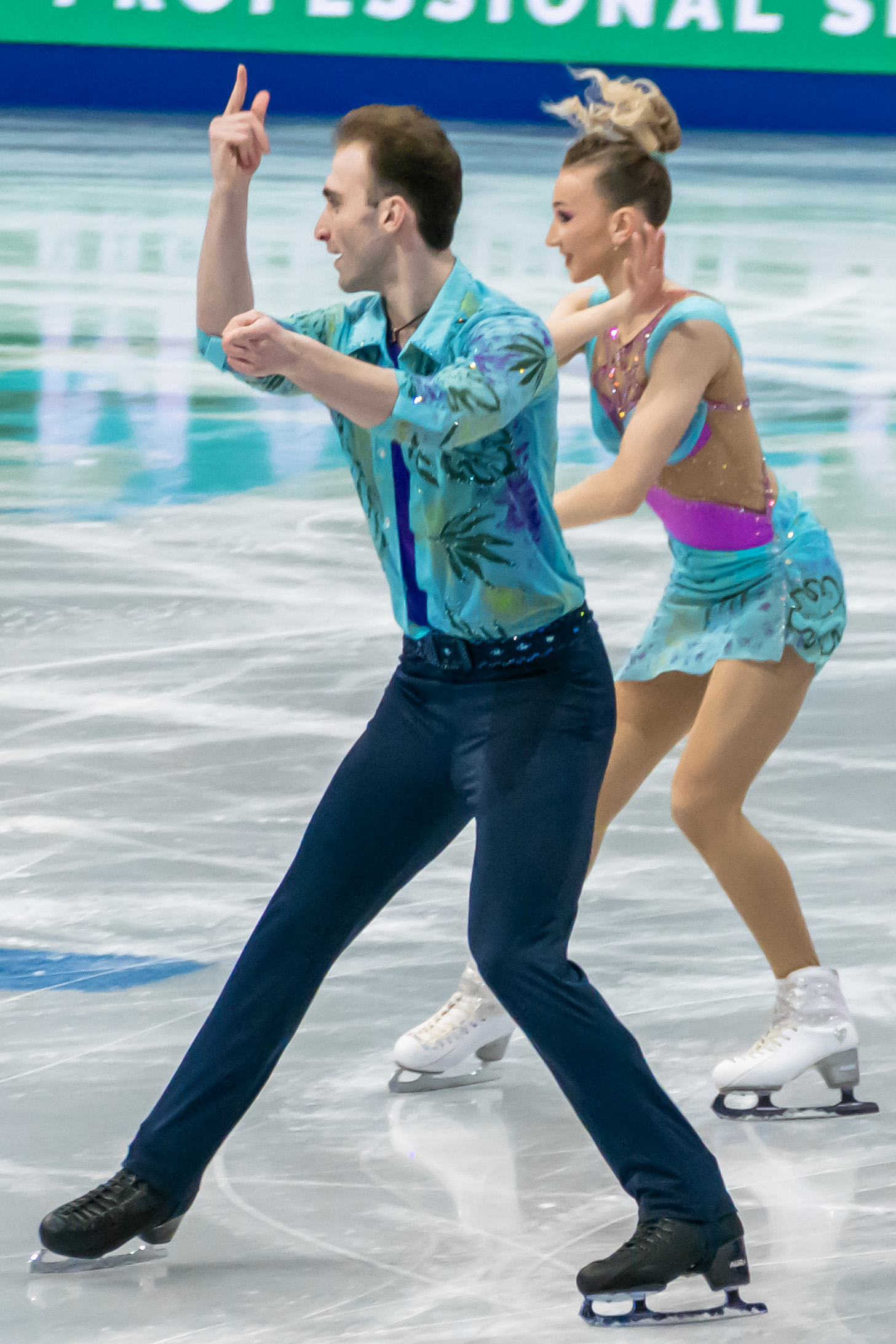
The 2023 Junior Grand Prix in Turkey champions: Seo Min-kyu of South Korea (men's singles); Ami Nakai of Japan (women's singles); and Anastasiia Metelkina and Luka Berulava of Georgia (pair skating)
Not pictured: Mariia Pinchuk and Mykyta Pogorielov of Ukraine (ice dance)

=== Men's singles ===
Men's event medalists
Year	Location	Gold	Silver	Bronze	Ref.
2009	Istanbul	(China) Yan Han	(Russia) Stanislav Kovalev	(Japan) Kento Nakamura	
2012	Istanbul	(United States) Jason Brown	(Russia) Alexander Petrov	(Canada) Nam Nguyen	
2023	Istanbul	(South Korea) Seo Min-kyu	(Japan) Rio Nakata	(Japan) Daiya Ebihara	
2024	Ankara	(United States) Jacob Sanchez	(Japan) Shunsuke Nakamura	(Estonia) Arlet Levandi	
2025	Ankara	(South Korea) Seo Min-kyu	(Japan) Sena Takahashi	(United States) Lucius Kazanecki	
2026	Ankara	(Japan) Daiya Ebihara	(Ukraine) Yehor Kurtsev	(South Korea) Choi Ha-bin	

=== Women's singles ===
Women's event medalists
Year	Location	Gold	Silver	Bronze	Ref.
2009	Istanbul	(United States) Kiri Baga	(Russia) Sofia Biryukova	(United States) Christina Gao	
2012	Istanbul	(United States) Leah Keiser	(South Korea) Park So-youn	(Japan) Satoko Miyahara	
2023	Istanbul	(Japan) Ami Nakai	(Japan) Rena Uezono	(South Korea) Kim Yu-jae	
2024	Ankara	(South Korea) Kim Yu-seong	(Japan) Ami Nakai	(France) Stefania Gladki	
2025	Ankara	(Japan) Mayuko Oka	(South Korea) Kim Yu-jae	(United States) Sophie Joline von Felten	
2026	Ankara	(Japan) Mei Okada	(China) Jin Shuxian	(France) Stefania Gladki	

=== Pairs ===
In 2023, Anastasiia Metelkina and Luka Berulava became the first pairs team from Georgia to win an ISU Junior Grand Prix gold medal. In 2026, Anita Mapelli and Noah Quesada Grau became the first pairs team from Spain to win a Junior Grand Prix medal.

Pairs event medalists
Year	Location	Gold	Silver	Bronze	Ref.
2009	Istanbul	No pairs competitions			
2012	Istanbul	No pairs competitions			
2023	Istanbul	(Georgia (country)); Anastasiia Metelkina; Luka Berulava	(United States); Olivia Flores; Luke Wang	(Canada); Jazmine Desrochers; Kieran Thrasher	
2024	Ankara	(Canada); Jazmine Desrochers; Kieran Thrasher	(United States); Olivia Flores; Luke Wang	(Japan); Sae Shimizu; Lucas Tsuyoshi Honda	
2025	Ankara	(Canada); Ava Kemp; Yohnatan Elizarov	(China); Guo Rui; Zhang Yiwen	(Canada); Julia Quattrocchi; Étienne Lacasse	
2026	Ankara	(Individual Neutral Athletes); Taisiia Guseva; Daniil Ovchinnikov	(Individual Neutral Athletes); Polina Shesheleva; Egor Karnaukhov	(Spain); Anita Mapelli; Noah Quesada Grau	

=== Ice dance ===
In 2023, Gina Zehnder and Beda Leon Sieber became the first ice dance team from Switzerland to win an ISU Junior Grand Prix medal.

Ice dance event medalists
Year	Location	Gold	Silver	Bronze	Ref.
2009	Istanbul	(Russia); Ksenia Monko; Kirill Khaliavin	(Russia); Ekaterina Pushkash; Jonathan Guerreiro	(United States); Isabella Cannuscio; Ian Lorello	
2012	Istanbul	(Russia); Alexandra Stepanova; Ivan Bukin	(Germany); Shari Koch; Christian Nüchtern	(Canada); Madeline Edwards; Zhao Kai Pang	
2023	Istanbul	(Ukraine); Mariia Pinchuk; Mykyta Pogorielov	(United States); Yahli Pedersen; Jeffrey Chen	(Switzerland); Gina Zehnder; Beda Leon Sieber	
2024	Ankara	(Germany); Darya Grimm; Michail Savitskiy	(Ukraine); Iryna Pidgaina; Artem Koval	(United States); Hana Maria Aboian; Daniil Veselukhin	
2025	Ankara	(Ukraine); Iryna Pidgaina; Artem Koval	(Canada); Charlie Anderson; Cayden Dawson	(France); Léa Hienne; Louis Varescon	
2026	Ankara	(United States); Hana Maria Aboian; Daniil Veselukhin	(France); Dania Mouaden; Théo Bigot	(United States); Xinyu Chen; Gordei Chitipakhovian	
