= ISU Junior Grand Prix in Latvia =

International figure skating competition

Junior Grand Prix in Latvia
- Status: Active
- Genre: ISU Junior Grand Prix
- Frequency: Occasional
- Location: Riga
- Country: Latvia
- Inaugurated: 2011
- Most recent: 2026
- Organizer: Latvian Skating Association

The ISU Junior Grand Prix in Latvia – officially known as the Riga Cup – is an international figure skating competition sanctioned by the International Skating Union (ISU), organized and hosted by the Latvian Skating Association (Latvian: Latvijas Slidošanas asociācija). It is held periodically as an event of the ISU Junior Grand Prix of Figure Skating (JGP), a series of international competitions exclusively for junior-level skaters. Medals may be awarded in men's singles, women's singles, pair skating, and ice dance. Skaters earn points based on their results at the qualifying competitions each season, and the top skaters or teams in each discipline are invited to then compete at the Junior Grand Prix of Figure Skating Final.

== History ==
The ISU Junior Grand Prix of Figure Skating (JGP) was established by the International Skating Union (ISU) in 1997 and consists of a series of seven international figure skating competitions exclusively for junior-level skaters. The locations of the Junior Grand Prix events change every year. While all seven competitions feature the men's, women's, and ice dance events, only four competitions each season feature the pairs event. Skaters earn points based on their results each season, and the top skaters or teams in each discipline are then invited to compete at the Junior Grand Prix of Figure Skating Final.

Skaters are eligible to compete on the junior-level circuit if they are at least 13 years old before 1 July of the respective season, but not yet 19 (for single skaters), 21 (for men and women in ice dance and women in pair skating), or 23 (for men in pair skating). Competitors are chosen by their respective skating federations. The number of entries allotted to each ISU member nation in each discipline is determined by their results at the prior World Junior Figure Skating Championships.

Latvia hosted its first Junior Grand Prix competition in 2011 in Riga. Ryuju Hino of Japan won the men's event, Polina Shelepen of Russia won the women's event, Sui Wenjing and Han Cong of China won the pairs event, and Maria Nosulia and Yevhen Kholoniuk of Ukraine won the ice dance event.

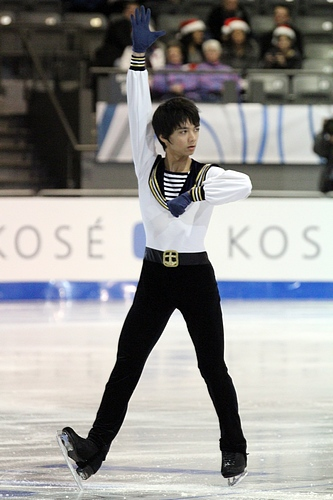
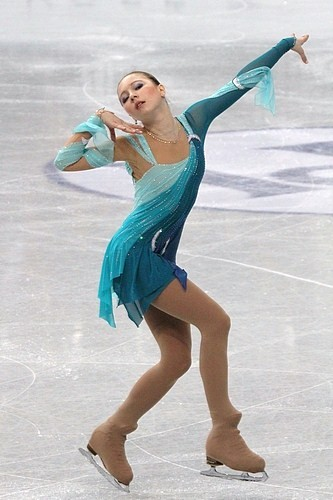
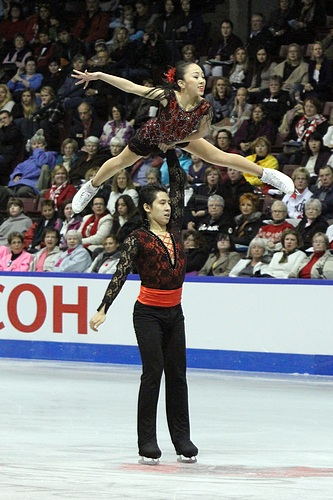
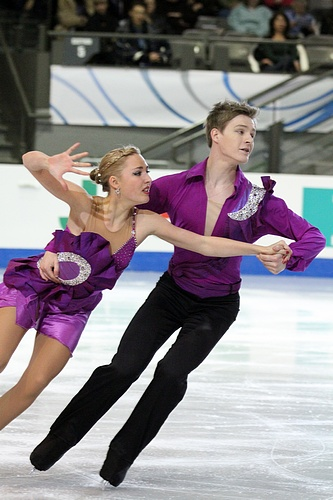
The inaugural Junior Grand Prix in Latvia champions: Ryuju Hino of Japan (men's singles); Polina Shelepen of Russia (women's singles); Sui Wenjing and Han Cong of China (pair skating); and Maria Nosulia and Yevhen Kholoniuk of Ukraine (ice dance)

The ISU officially cancelled all scheduled Junior Grand Prix events for the 2020–21 season, which included the 2020 Riga Cup, due to the COVID-19 pandemic, citing increased travel and entry requirements between countries and potentially excessive sanitary and health care costs for those hosting competitions. On 30 June 2026, the ISU announced that figure skaters from Russia and Belarus would be allowed to compete at international competitions as Individual Neutral Athletes (AINs). Each skater was required to undergo an individual assessment conducted by the ISU Council to determine whether they met the criteria for neutral status, which included having not previously taken active part in the Russian war in Ukraine, as well as not having actively or publicly supported the war. As AINs, Russian and Belarusian skaters were not permitted to compete under their national flags or anthems. The most recent iteration of this competition was held in 2026.

== Medalists ==
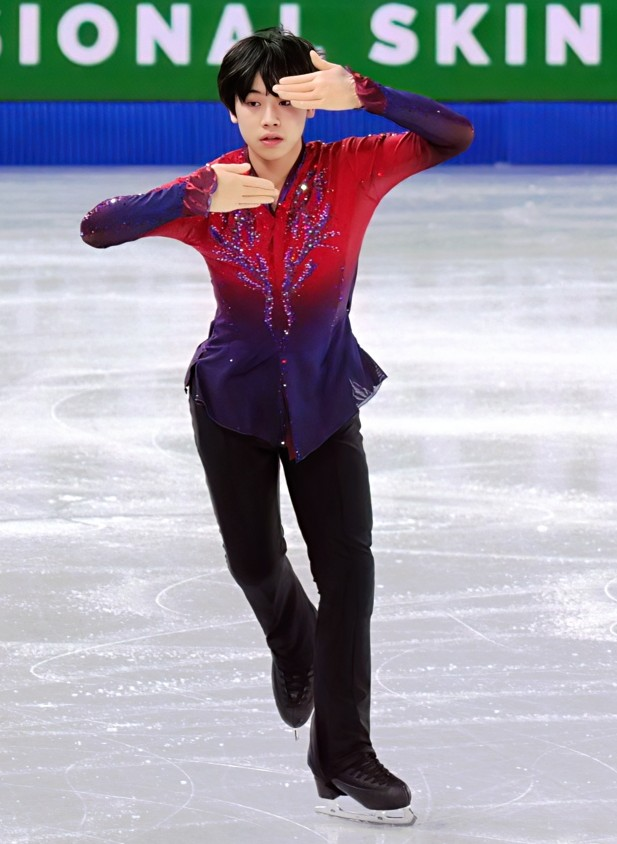
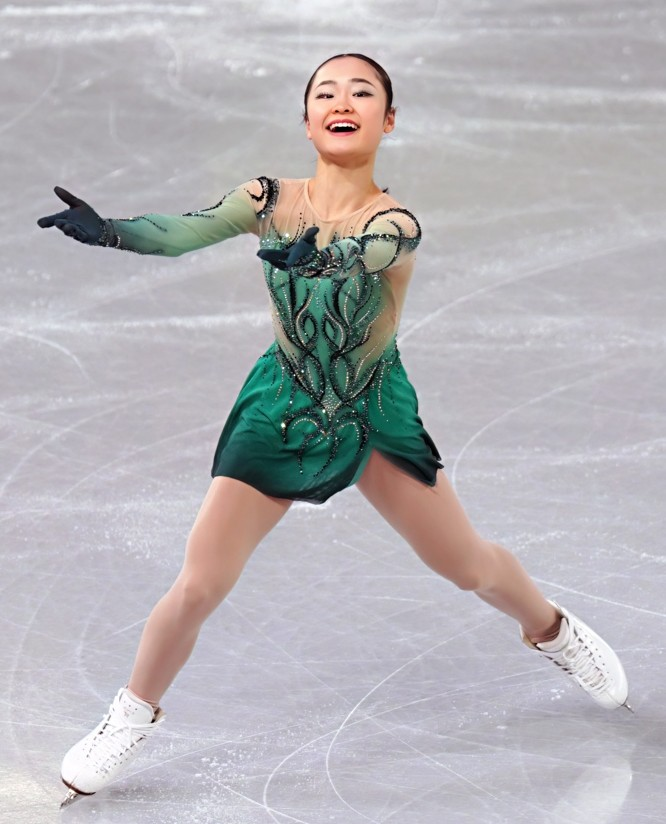
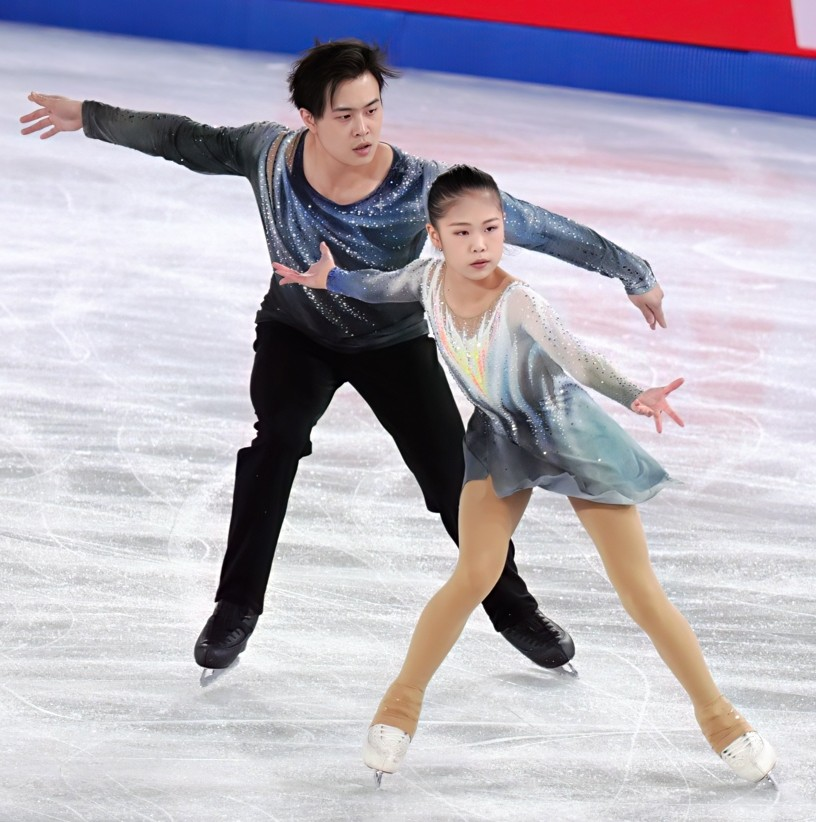
The 2024 Riga Cup champions: Sena Takahashi of Japan (men's singles); Mao Shimada of Japan (women's singles); and Zhang Jiaxuan and Huang Yihang of China (pair skating).
Not pictured: Noemi Maria Tali and Noah Lafornara of Italy (ice dance)

=== Men's singles ===
Men's event medalists
Year	Location	Gold	Silver	Bronze	Ref.
2011	Riga	(Japan) Ryuju Hino	(China) Zhang He	(United States) Timothy Dolensky	
2013	Riga	(China) Jin Boyang	(Russia) Adian Pitkeev	(Japan) Shoma Uno	
2015	Riga	(Russia) Dmitri Aliev	(Latvia) Deniss Vasiļjevs	(United States) Alexei Krasnozhon	
2017	Riga	(Japan) Mitsuki Sumoto	(Russia) Makar Ignatov	(United States) Tomoki Hiwatashi	
2019	Riga	(Russia) Andrei Mozalev	(South Korea) Lee Si-hyeong	(Russia) Daniil Samsonov	
2020	Riga	Competition cancelled due to the COVID-19 pandemic			
2022	Riga	(Italy) Nikolaj Memola	(Japan) Rio Nakata	(Kazakhstan) Rakhat Bralin	
2024	Riga	(Japan) Sena Takahashi	(South Korea) Lee Jae-keun	(Japan) Shunsuke Nakamura	
2025	Riga	(Japan) Rio Nakata	(Canada) Grayson Long	(Germany) Genrikh Gartung	
2026	Riga	(South Korea) Choi Ha-bin	(South Korea) Lee Jae-keun	(Switzerland) Ean Weiler	

=== Women's singles ===
Women's event medalists
Year	Location	Gold	Silver	Bronze	Ref.
2011	Riga	(Russia) Polina Shelepen	(China) Li Zijun	(Russia) Polina Agafonova	
2013	Riga	(Russia) Evgenia Medvedeva	(Russia) Maria Sotskova	(United States) Karen Chen	
2015	Riga	(Russia) Maria Sotskova	(Japan) Kaori Sakamoto	(South Korea) Choi Da-bin	
2017	Riga	(Russia) Daria Panenkova	(Japan) Rika Kihira	(United States) Emmy Ma	
2019	Riga	(South Korea) Lee Hae-in	(Russia) Daria Usacheva	(Japan) Rino Matsuike	
2020	Riga	Competition cancelled due to the COVID-19 pandemic			
2022	Riga	(South Korea) Shin Ji-a	(United States) Soho Lee	(Japan) Ami Nakai	
2024	Riga	(Japan) Mao Shimada	(Estonia) Elina Goidina	(South Korea) Ko Na-yeon	
2025	Riga	(Japan) Mei Okada	(South Korea) Huh Ji-yu	(Switzerland) Elisabeth Dibbern	
2026	Riga	(Australia) Hana Bath	(Japan) Mei Okada	(China) Wang Yihan	

=== Pairs ===
Pairs event medalists
Year	Location	Gold	Silver	Bronze	Ref.
2011	Riga	(China); Sui Wenjing; Han Cong	(China); Yu Xiaoyu; Jin Yang	(Canada); Margaret Purdy; Michael Marinaro	
2013	Riga	(China); Yu Xiaoyu; Jin Yang	(Russia); Evgenia Tarasova; Vladimir Morozov	(Russia); Maria Vigalova; Egor Zakroev	
2015	Riga	(Ukraine); Renata Oganesian; Mark Bardei	(Russia); Anastasia Poluianova; Stepan Korotkov	(Russia); Ekaterina Borisova; Dmitry Sopot	
2017	Riga	(Russia); Apollinariia Panfilova; Dmitry Rylov	(Russia); Aleksandra Boikova; Dmitrii Kozlovskii	(Canada); Evelyn Walsh; Trennt Michaud	
2019	Riga	No pairs competition			
2020	Riga	Competition cancelled due to the COVID-19 pandemic			
2022	Riga	(United States); Cayla Smith; Andy Deng	(Canada); Ava Rae Kemp; Yohnatan Elizarov	(Canada); Ashlyn Schmitz; Tristan Taylor	
2024	Riga	(China); Zhang Jiaxuan; Huang Yihang	(Canada); Jazmine Desrochers; Kieran Thrasher	(United States); Olivia Flores; Luke Wang	
2025	Riga	(Canada); Ava Kemp; Yohnatan Elizarov	(China); Zhang Xuanqi; Feng Wenqiang	(United States); Naomi Williams; Lachlan Lewer	
2026	Riga	(China); Chen Yuxuan; Dong Yinbo	(United States); Reagan Moss; Jakub Galbavy	(Czech Republic); Debora Anna Cohen; Lukas Vochozka	

=== Ice dance ===
Ice dance event medalists
Year	Location	Gold	Silver	Bronze	Ref.
2011	Riga	(Ukraine); Maria Nosulia; Yevhen Kholoniuk	(Russia); Evgenia Kosigina; Nikolai Moroshkin	(United States); Alexandra Aldridge; Daniel Eaton	
2013	Riga	(Canada); Mackenzie Bent; Garrett MacKeen	(United States); Lorraine McNamara; Quinn Carpenter	(Russia); Alla Loboda; Pavel Drozd	
2015	Riga	(Russia); Betina Popova; Yuri Vlasenko	(France); Angélique Abachkina; Louis Thauron	(Russia); Sofia Evdokimova; Egor Bazin	
2017	Riga	(Russia); Sofia Shevchenko; Igor Eremenko	(Russia); Anastasia Shpilevaya; Grigory Smirnov	(United States); Caroline Green; Gordon Green	
2019	Riga	(Russia); Elizaveta Khudaiberdieva; Andrey Filatov	(Georgia (country)); Maria Kazakova; Georgy Reviya	(Russia); Sofya Tyutyunina; Alexander Shustitskiy	
2020	Riga	Competition cancelled due to the COVID-19 pandemic			
2022	Riga	(Germany); Darya Grimm; Michail Savitskiy	(Canada); Sandrine Gauthier; Quentin Thieren	(Ukraine); Mariia Pinchuk; Mykyta Pogorielov	
2024	Riga	(Italy); Noemi Maria Tali; Noah Lafornara	(United States); Caroline Mullen; Brendan Mullen	(Germany); Darya Grimm; Michail Savitskiy	
2025	Riga	(Canada); Layla Veillon; Alexander Brandys	(France); Dania Mouaden; Théo Bigot	(United States); Jasmine Robertson; Chase Rohner	
2026	Riga	(France); Dania Mouaden; Théo Bigot	(United States); Aneta Václavíková; William Lissauer	(Germany); Eniko Kobor; Zoard Kobor	
