= Kim Min-chae =

South Korean figure skater (born 2006)

Personal information
- Native name: 김민채
- Other names: Minchae Kim
- Born: 26 February 2006 (age 20) Seoul, South Korea
- Home town: Seoul
- Height: 1.56 m (5 ft 1 1/2 in)

Figure skating career
- Country: South Korea
- Coach: Chi Hyun-jung; Kim Jin-seo
- Began skating: 2014

Kim Min-chae (Korean: 김민채; born 26 February 2006) is a South Korean figure skater. She is the 2022 CS Denis Ten Memorial Challenge champion and the 2024 CS Nebelhorn Trophy bronze medalist.

== Personal life ==
Kim was born on 26 February 2006 in Seoul, South Korea.

== Career ==
=== Early career ===
Kim began skating in 2014 and was initially coached by Lee Bo-ram.

Kim made her international debut as an advanced novice at the 2018 Crystal Skate of Romania, which she won. She then went on to win the silver medal at the 2019 Korean Junior Championships.

Her second international competition was as a junior at the 2019 Prague Ice Cup, the following season, where she won the silver medal. Debuting on the senior National level, Kim place twelfth at the 2020 Korean Championships.

The following year, Kim placed tenth at the 2021 Korean Championships.

Prior to the 2021–22 figure skating season, Park Bit-na became her coach.

=== 2021–22 season ===
Debuting on the 2021–22 ISU Junior Grand Prix, Kim finished fourth at 2021 Junior Grand Prix Slovenia. Although assigned to compete at 2021 Junior Grand Prix Poland, Kim was forced to withdraw after rupturing a disk in her lower back. Despite this, Kim went on to compete at the 2022 Korean Championships in January, where she finished seventh.

Following the season, Kim left coach, Park Bit-na to train under Shin Hea-sook.

=== 2022–23 season ===
Kim competed on the 2022–23 ISU Junior Grand Prix at 2022 Junior Grand Prix Poland I and 2022 Junior Grand Prix Italy, finishing thirteenth and eighth, respectively.

Kim made her senior international debut at the 2022 CS Denis Ten Memorial Challenge, where she won the gold medal. She then went on to finish nineteenth at the 2022 CS Ice Challenge. At the 2023 Korean Championships, Kim finished the season with a thirteenth-place finish. She returned to coach, Park Bit-na, following the event.

=== 2023–24 season ===
Beginning the season at the 2023 CS Nebelhorn Trophy, Kim won the bronze medal. She went on to finish twenty-fifth at the annual South Korean Ranking Competition. She did not compete at the 2024 South Korean Championships.

=== 2024–25 season ===
Prior to the start of the season, Kim left Park Bit-na and began training under Chi Hyun-jung and Kim Jin-seo.

Kim was assigned to compete at 2024 Skate America and 2024 Cup of China, acting as a replacement to Lee Hae-in and Ava Marie Ziegler, respectively. Kim would finish tenth at Skate America and eleventh at the Cup of China. One week following the latter event, she would place eighteenth at the South Korean Ranking Competition.

Kim then finished the season by placing twenty-first at the 2025 South Korean Championships.

=== 2025–26 season ===
Kim started the season in August by competing at the 2025 CS Cranberry Cup International, where she finished in ninth place.

== Programs ==
| Season | Short program | Free skating | Exhibition |
|---|---|---|---|
| 2025–2026 | La Bohème by Charles Aznavour choreo. by Leonid Sviridenko | Time (from Inception) by Hans Zimmer & Matt Dunkley choreo. by Leonid Sviridenko | |
| 2024–2025 | Tango de Amor (from The Addams Family) by Andrew Lippa choreo. by David Wilson | La terre vue du ciel by Armand Amar choreo. by Shin Yea-ji | Sparkling Diamonds (from Moulin Rouge!) performed by Nicole Kidman choreo. by Kenji Miyamoto |
| 2023–2024 | Tango de Amor (from The Addams Family) by Andrew Lippa choreo. by David Wilson | Piano Concerto No. 2 in B-Flat Major, Op. 83; II. Allegro; III. Andante by Johannes Brahms choreo. by David Wilson | |
| 2022–2023 | Miss Saigon; Overture by Claude-Michel Schönberg and Alain Boublil; Sun and Moon performed by Lea Salonga, Simon Bowman choreo. by Shin Yea-ji; Sparkling Diamonds (from Moulin Rouge!) performed by Nicole Kidman choreo. by Kenji Miyamoto | Romeo + Juliet; Kissing You by Des'ree; O Verona by Craig Armstrong choreo. by Shin Yea-ji | Sparkling Diamonds (from Moulin Rouge!) performed by Nicole Kidman choreo. by Kenji Miyamoto |
| 2021–2022 | Miss Saigon; Overture by Claude-Michel Schönberg and Alain Boublil; Sun and Moon performed by Lea Salonga, Simon Bowman choreo. by Shin Yea-ji | Die Another Day performed by the Prague Philharmonic Orchestra; From Russia with Love by John Barry; James Bond Theme by Monty Norman; Skyfall by Adele choreo. Kim Hae-jin | |
| 2020–2021 | Eye of the Tiger by Survivor performed by Tommee Profitt ft. FJØRA choreo. by Shin Yea-ji | The Phantom of the Opera; Overture by Andrew Lloyd Webber; Wishing You Were Somehow Here Again performed by Emmy Rossum choreo. Shin Yea-ji | |
| 2019–2020 | Libertango by Astor Piazzolla performed by Bond choreo. by Kim Hae-jin | The Firebird by Igor Stravinsky choreo. Shin Yea-ji | |
| 2018–2019 | Mama, I'm a Big Girl Now (from Hairspray) by Marc Shaiman choreo. by Kim Hae-jin | Moulin Rouge!: One Day I'll Fly Away; Sparkling Diamonds performed by Nicole Kidman choreo. by Kim Hae-jin | |

== Competitive highlights ==
- GP – Event of the ISU Grand Prix Series
- JGP – Event of the ISU Junior Grand Prix Series
- CS – Event of the ISU Challenger Series
- TBD – Assigned
- WD – Withdrew from competition

Competition placements at senior level
| Season | 2019–20 | 2020–21 | 2021–22 | 2022–23 | 2023–24 | 2024–25 | 2025–26 |
|---|---|---|---|---|---|---|---|
| South Korean Championships | 12th | 10th | 7th | 13th | | 21st | |
| GP Cup of China | | | | | | 11th | |
| GP Skate America | | | | | | 10th | |
| CS Cranberry Cup | | | | | | | 9th |
| CS Denis Ten Memorial | | | | 1st | | | |
| CS Ice Challenge | | | | 19th | | | |
| CS Nebelhorn Trophy | | | | | 3rd | | |

Competition placements at junior level
| Season | 2018–19 | 2020–21 | 2021–22 | 2022–23 |
|---|---|---|---|---|
| South Korean Championships | 2nd | | | |
| JGP Italy | | | | 8th |
| JGP Poland | | | WD | 13th |
| JGP Slovenia | | | 4th | |
| Prague Ice Cup | | 2nd | | |

== Detailed results ==
ISU personal best scores in the +5/-5 GOE System
| Segment | Type | Score | Event |
|---|---|---|---|
| Total | **TSS** | **192.48** | 2021 JGP Slovenia |
| Short program | **TSS** | **70.83** | 2021 JGP Slovenia |
| Short program | TES | 40.94 | 2021 JGP Slovenia |
| Short program | PCS | 29.89 | 2021 JGP Slovenia |
| Free skating | **TSS** | **121.65** | 2021 JGP Slovenia |
| Free skating | TES | 65.52 | 2023 CS Nebelhorn Trophy |
| Free skating | PCS | 58.94 | 2021 JGP Slovenia |

Current personal best scores are highlighted in bold.

=== Senior results ===
2025–26 season
| Date | Event | SP | FS | Total |
|---|---|---|---|---|
| 7–10 August 2025 | 2025 CS Cranberry Cup International | 6; 53.82 | 10; 87.13 | 9; 140.95 |
2024–25 season
| Date | Event | SP | FS | Total |
| 2–5 January 2025 | 2025 South Korean Championships | 16; 55.00 | 23; 74.47 | 21; 129.47 |
| 22–24 November 2024 | 2024 Cup of China | 7; 62.94 | 12; 91.45 | 11; 154.39 |
| 18–20 October 2024 | 2024 Skate America | 6; 60.66 | 11; 104.91 | 10; 165.57 |
2023–24 season
| Date | Event | SP | FS | Total |
| 20–23 September 2023 | 2023 CS Nebelhorn Trophy | 2; 62.76 | 3; 121.27 | 3; 184.03 |
2022–23 season
| Date | Event | SP | FS | Total |
| 5–8 January 2023 | 2023 South Korean Championships | 16; 53.37 | 11; 117.01 | 13; 170.38 |
| 9–13 November 2022 | 2022 CS Ice Challenge | 10; 52.45 | 23; 77.83 | 19; 130.28 |
| 26–29 October 2022 | 2022 CS Denis Ten Memorial Challenge | 7; 41.05 | 1; 117.79 | 1; 158.84 |
2021–22 season
| Date | Event | SP | FS | Total |
| 7–9 January 2022 | 2022 South Korean Championships | 7; 65.12 | 8; 126.39 | 7; 191.51 |
2020–21 season
| Date | Event | SP | FS | Total |
| 24–26 February 2021 | 2021 South Korean Championships | 10; 57.54 | 10; 111.74 | 10; 169.28 |
2019–20 season
| Date | Event | SP | FS | Total |
| 3–5 January 2020 | 2020 South Korean Championships | 14; 50.68 | 11; 101.38 | 12; 151.98 |

=== Junior results ===
2022–23 season
| Date | Event | SP | FS | Total |
|---|---|---|---|---|
| 12–15 October 2022 | 2021 JGP Italy | 25; 43.16 | 5; 118.29 | 8; 161.45 |
| 28 Sept. – 1 Oct. 2022 | 2022 JGP Poland I | 6; 59.47 | 15; 92.78 | 13; 152.25 |
2021–22 season
| Date | Event | SP | FS | Total |
| 22–25 September 2021 | 2021 Junior Grand Prix Slovenia | 2; **70.83** | 5; **121.65** | 4; **192.48** |
2019–20 season
| Date | Event | SP | FS | Total |
| 8–10 November 2019 | 2019 Prague Ice Cup | 2; 46.98 | 1; 92.41 | 2; 139.39 |
2018–19 season
| 11–13 January 2019 | 2019 South Korean Championships | 1; 51.86 | 2; 92.98 | 2; 144.84 |
