= Lee Jae-keun =

South Korean figure skater (born 2007)

Personal information
- Native name: 이재근
- Full name: Lee Jae-keun
- Born: November 20, 2007 (age 18) Hwasun-gun, Jeollanam-do, South Korea
- Height: 1.80 m (5 ft 11 in)

Figure skating career
- Country: South Korea
- Discipline: Men's singles
- Coach: Chi Hyun-jung; Ji Min-ji; An So-hyun
- Began skating: 2014

Lee Jae-keun (Korean: 이재근; born November 20, 2007) is a South Korean figure skater. He is the 2024 JGP Latvia and 2026 JGP Latvia silver medalist, and finished in the top six at the 2024 World Junior Championships.

== Personal life ==
Lee was born on November 20, 2007, in Hwasun-gun, Jeollanam-do, South Korea. He has three siblings: an older brother and sister, as well as a younger sister.

== Career ==
=== Early career ===
After watching a video of Yuna Kim's El Tango de Roxanne short program from the 2007 World Championships, Lee's parents decided to sign their youngest daughter, Bo-mi, up for figure skating in 2014. They signed Lee up for lessons as well so his sister would not have to attend them alone. From there, Lee fell in love with the sport. Upon noticing Lee's talent for figure skating and wanting their children to have access to better training conditions, Lee's parents sold their home and while his mother and older siblings remained in Hwasun-gun, Lee's father moved him and his younger sister to Incheon, Seoul.

Lee made his international debut as a basic novice, winning gold at the 2018 Asian Open Trophy. The following year, he won the silver medal as an advanced novice at the 2019 Prague Ice Cup. Competing on the senior level at the 2021 South Korean Championships, Lee came in sixth place.

=== 2021–22 season ===
Coached by Han Sung-mi, Lee began the season by finishing third at the 2021 South Korean ISU Junior Grand Prix Qualifiers and was given a Junior Grand Prix assignment as a result of his placement. Debuting on the Junior Grand Prix circuit, Lee finished fifth at 2021 JGP Slovakia. He went on to finish sixth at the 2022 South Korean Championships.

Following the season, Lee made a coaching change from Han Sung-mi to Park Bit-na.

=== 2022–23 season ===
Lee started the season by winning bronze at the 2022 South Korean ISU Junior Grand Prix Qualifiers and, due to this placement, was given one Junior Grand Prix assignment. He went on to compete on the junior level at the 2022 South East Asian Open Trophy, where he won the gold medal.

At 2022 JGP Italy, Lee finished sixth-place. Going on to compete at the 2023 South Korean Championships in January, Lee finished seventh.

=== 2023–24 season ===
Before beginning the season, Lee switched coaches from Park Bit-na to Choi Hyung-kyung. He first competed at the 2023 South Korean ISU Junior Grand Prix Qualifiers, where he finished fourth. With this placement, Lee was assigned one Junior Grand Prix event. At this JGP event in Japan, Lee finished sixth.

In January, Lee competed at the 2024 South Korean Championships, where he finished fifth. With this result, Lee was given one of the two spots to compete at the 2024 World Junior Championships in Taipei, Taiwan. At these championships, Lee placed twelfth in the short program but fifth in the free skate, moving up to sixth-place overall. "I am happy that my components are so high here," said Lee. "It shows that I worked on it.”

Following the event, he said, “Even though I was nervous, I was very honored because it was a bigger stage, and I felt really good. I focused until the end and I think I finished well.” His placement, along with teammate, Seo Min-kyu's, first-place finish earned South Korea three spots for the men's singles event at the 2025 World Junior Championships.

=== 2024–25 season ===
Lee began the season by winning silver at the 2024 South Korean ISU Junior Grand Prix Qualifiers and was given two Junior Grand Prix assignments as a result of this placement. Lee's first event on the Junior Grand Prix circuit was 2024 JGP Latvia where he won the silver medal after placing third in the short program and second in the free skate. He would subsequently go on to finish fourth at 2024 JGP China.

In late November, Lee competed on the senior level at the annual South Korean Ranking Event, where he finished in fourth place. One month later, he placed sixth at the 2025 South Korean Championships.

Selected to compete at the 2025 World Junior Championships in Debrecen, Hungary, Lee concluded the season with an eleventh-place finish at that event.

=== 2025–26 season ===
In July, it was announced that Lee had made a coaching change and was now training under Chi Hyun-jung and Kim Jin-seo. The following month, Lee started the season by making his senior international debut at the 2025 CS Cranberry Cup International and finishing in tenth place. He went on to continue competing on the 2025–26 Challenger Series, Lee finished sixth at the 2025 CS Kinoshita Group Cup and seventh at the 2025 CS Nebelhorn Trophy.

In November, he competed at the annual South Korean Ranking Competition, finishing in fifth place. Following the event, he was named to the 2026 Four Continents Championships. In January, Lee placed sixth at the 2026 South Korean Championships.

== Programs ==
Season	Short program	Free skating	Exhibition
2026–2027		When I'm Gone (from The Sandman) by David Buckley choreo. by Shin Yea-ji	
2025–2026	Mi Mancherai (from Il Postino: The Postman) by Luis Bacalov & Marco Marinangeli performed by Josh Groban & Joshua Bell choreo. by Kim Hae-jin	Archangel by Two Steps from Hell choreo. by Misha Ge; Piano Concerto No. 2 by Sergei Rachmaninoff choreo. by Jeffrey Buttle	Memories by Conan Gray choreo. by Cha Jun-hwan
2024–2025	Movement by Hozier choreo. by Lim Eun-soo	Archangel by Two Steps from Hell choreo. by Misha Ge	Io ci sarò by Andrea Bocelli & Lang Lang choreo. by Kim Hae-jin; Movement by Hozier choreo. by Lim Eun-soo
2023–2024	Io ci sarò by Andrea Bocelli & Lang Lang choreo. by Kim Hae-jin	O Verona (from Romeo + Juliet) by Craig Armstrong; Fortune's Fool; Tempt Not a Desperate Man; First Kiss; Eternal Love; A Thousand Times Good Night (from Romeo & Juliet) by Abel Korzeniowski choreo. by Kim Hae-jin	
2022–2023	Otoñal by Raúl Di Blasio choreo. by Shin Yea-ji	Pas de deux (from The Nutcracker) by Pyotr Ilyich Tchaikovsky performed by André Previn choreo. by Shin Yea-ji	
2021–2022	Otoñal by Raúl Di Blasio choreo. by Shin Yea-ji	The Untouchables; The Man with the Matches; The Strength of the Righteous; Death Theme; Al Capone; The Untouchables by Ennio Morricone choreo. by Shin Yea-ji	
2020–2021	No Limit by Chloe Flower choreo. by Shin Yea-ji	The Untouchables; The Man with the Matches; The Strength of the Righteous; Death Theme; Al Capone; The Untouchables by Ennio Morricone choreo. by Shin Yea-ji	
2019–2020	The Edge by David McCallum; Unsquare Dance by Dave Brubeck; Was He Slow? (from Baby Driver) Kid Koala	Beethoven Havok (from X-Men: Apocalypse) by John Ottman; Beethoven's 5 Secrets by The Piano Guys	
2018–2019	All I Ask of You (from The Phantom of the Opera) performed by Josh Groban & Kelly Clarkson	Beethoven Havok (from X-Men: Apocalypse) by John Ottman; Beethoven's 5 Secrets by The Piano Guys	

== Competitive highlights ==
- JGP – Event of the ISU Junior Grand Prix Series
- CS – Event of the ISU Challenger Series
- TBD – Assigned
- WD – Withdrew from competition

Competition placements at senior level
Season	2020–21	2021–22	2022–23	2023–24	2024–25	2025–26
Four Continents Championships						16th
South Korean Championships	6th	6th	7th	5th	6th	6th
CS Cranberry Cup						10th
CS Kinoshita Group Cup						6th
CS Nebelhorn Trophy						7th

Competition placements at junior level
Season	2021–22	2022–23	2023–24	2024–25	2025-26	2026–27
World Junior Championships			6th	11th	7th	
JGP China				4th		
JGP Italy		6th				
JGP Japan			6th			
JGP Latvia				2nd		2nd
JGP Slovakia	5th					
SEA Open Trophy		1st				

== Detailed results ==
ISU personal best scores in the +5/-5 GOE System
Segment	Type	Score	Event
Total	**TSS**	**229.77**	2026 JGP Latvia
Short program	**TSS**	**85.13**	2026 JGP Slovenia
Short program	TES	48.41	2026 JGP Slovenia
Short program	PCS	37.58	2025 CS Kinoshita Group Cup
Free skating	**TSS**	**146.97**	2025 CS Nebelhorn Trophy
Free skating	TES	77.29	2024 JGP Latvia
Free skating	PCS	73.60	2025 CS Nebelhorn Trophy

=== Senior results ===
Current personal best scores are highlighted in bold.

2025–26 season
Date	Event	SP	FS	Total
Jan 21–25, 2026	2026 Four Continents Championships	7; 82.25	18; 128.97	16; 211.22
Jan 3–6, 2026	2026 South Korean Championships	6; 77.72	6; 151.64	6; 229.36
Sep 25–27, 2025	2025 CS Nebelhorn Trophy	7; 73.02	7; **146.97**	7; 219.99
Sep 5–7, 2025	2025 CS Kinoshita Group Cup	7; 82.41	7; 144.12	6; 226.53
Aug 7–10, 2025	2025 CS Cranberry Cup International	10; 68.55	10; 129.95	10; 198.50

=== Junior results ===
2026–27 season
Date	Event	Level	SP	FS	Total
Oct 1-3, 2026	2026 JGP Slovenia	Junior	1; **85.13**	2; 143.62	2; 228.75
Aug 27-29, 2026	2026 JGP Latvia	Junior	2; 83.20	2; 146.57	2; **229.77**
2025–26 season
Date	Event	Level	SP	FS	Total
Mar 3–8, 2026	2026 World Junior Championships	Junior	6; 79.27	6; 138.93	7; 218.20
2024–25 season
Date	Event	Level	SP	FS	Total
Feb 25–Mar 2, 2025	2025 World Junior Championships	Junior	9; 74.24	13; 137.78	11; 212.02
Jan 2–5, 2025	2025 South Korean Championships	Senior	6; 74.90	6; 156.34	6; 231.24
Oct 9–12, 2024	2024 JGP China	Junior	3; 74.08	6; 127.37	4; 201.45
Aug 28–31, 2024	2024 JGP Latvia	Junior	3; 73.78	2; 146.48	2; 220.26
2023–24 season
Date	Event	Level	SP	FS	Total
Feb 26–Mar 3, 2024	2024 World Junior Championships	Junior	12; 70.15	5; 142.07	6; 212.22
Jan 4–7, 2024	2024 South Korean Championships	Senior	5; 75.26	4; 151.38	5; 226.64
Sep 13–16, 2023	2023 JGP Japan	Junior	7; 65.76	5; 127.67	6; 193.43
2022–23 season
Date	Event	Level	SP	FS	Total
Jan 5–9, 2023	2023 South Korean Championships	Senior	7; 72.18	7; 138.56	7; 210.74
Oct 12–15, 2022	2022 JGP Italy	Junior	6; 69.47	5; 127.46	6; 196.93
Sep 2–4, 2022	2022 South East Asian Open Trophy	Junior	1; 64.78	1; 114.95	1; 179.73
2021–22 season
Date	Event	Level	SP	FS	Total
Jan 7–9, 2022	2022 South Korean Championships	Senior	5; 67.54	8; 132.12	6; 199.66
Sep 1–4, 2021	2021 JGP Slovakia	Junior	5; 68.70	8; 119.50	6; 188.20
2020–21 season
Date	Event	Level	SP	FS	Total
Feb 24–26, 2021	2021 South Korean Championships	Senior	7; 59.01	6; 111.43	6; 170.44
