= Park Bit-na =

South Korean figure skater

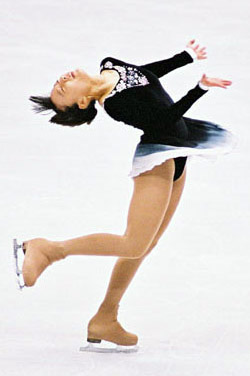
- Park at the 2002 Winter Olympics

Personal information
- Born: June 16, 1985 (age 41)
- Height: 165 cm (5 ft 5 in)

Figure skating career
- Country: South Korea
- Coach: Cho Sung-man
- Skating club: Korea Ice Academy Seoul
- Retired: 2005

Park Bit-na (Korean: 박빛나, born June 16, 1985) is a South Korean former competitive figure skater. She is the 3-time (1999–2002 & 2004) South Korean national champion. She represented South Korea at the 2002 Winter Olympics, where she placed 26th. She was born in Seoul.

== Coaching career ==
Following her competitive career, Park began working as a coach in Seoul.

Her current students include:

- Jang Ha-rin
- Kim Ye-sung
- Ko Na-yeon

Her former students include:

- Lee Dong-whun
- Lee Jae-keun
- Lim Eun-soo
- Kim Min-chae
- Kim Seo-young
- Park Yeon-jeong
- Shin Ji-a
- Yun Ah-sun

== Programs ==
Season	Short program	Free skating
2003–2004	Schindler's List by John Williams; Theme; Remembrance; Summer (from The Four Seasons) by Antonio Vivaldi performed by the Los Angeles Chamber Orchestra	The Prince of Egypt by Hans Zimmer

== Results ==
JGP: Junior Grand Prix

International
Event	98–99	99–00	00–01	01–02	02–03	03–04	04–05
Olympics				26th			
Worlds			23rd				
Four Continents			13th	17th	13th	17th	
Universiade							19th
International: Junior
Junior Worlds		26th					
JGP China	12th		10th				
JGP Norway		13th					
JGP Sweden		20th					
National
South Korea		1st	1st		2nd	2nd	4th
