= 2025 South Korean Figure Skating Championships =

Figure skating competition

- Type: National championship
- Date: January 2 – 5
- Season: 2024–25
- Location: Uijeongbu, South Korea
- Host: Korean Skating Union
- Venue: Uijeongbu Indoor Ice Rink

Champions
- Men's singles: Cha Jun-hwan (S); Lee Yun-ho (J)
- Women's singles: Kim Chae-yeon (S); Lee Gyu-ri (J)
- Ice dance: Hannah Lim / Ye Quan (S)
- Previous: 2024 South Korean Championships
- Next: 2026 South Korean Championships

The 2025 South Korean Figure Skating Championships were held from January 2–5, 2025 at the Uijeongbu Indoor Ice Rink in Uijeongbu. It was the 79th edition of the event. Medals were awarded in the disciplines of men's singles, women's singles, and ice dance on the senior and junior levels. The results were part of the Korean Skating Union's selection criteria for the 2025 World Junior Championships and the 2025 World Championships.

== Schedule ==
Date	Start	Finish	Discipline	Event
Thursday, January 2	12:45	13:37	Junior men	Short program
Thursday, January 2	13:52	18:08	Junior women	Short program
Friday, January 3	11:15	12:15	Junior men	Free skating
Friday, January 3	12:30	16:20	Junior women	Free skating
Saturday, January 4	11:45	12:57	Senior men	Short program
Saturday, January 4	13:12	16:36	Senior women	Short program
Saturday, January 4	16:51	17:04	Senior ice dance	Rhythm dance
Sunday, January 5	11:40	12:56	Senior men	Free skating
Sunday, January 5	13:11	16:51	Senior women	Free skating
Sunday, January 5	17:06	17:20	Senior ice dance	Free dance
All times are listed in Korea Standard Time (UTC+09:00).

== Medal summary ==
=== Senior ===
Discipline	Gold	Silver	Bronze
Men	Cha Jun-hwan	Seo Min-kyu	Lee Si-hyeong
Women	Kim Chae-yeon	Shin Ji-a	Kim Yu-jae
Ice dance	Hannah Lim / Ye Quan	No other competitors	

=== Junior ===
Discipline	Gold	Silver	Bronze
Men	Lee Yun-ho	Kim Aaron	Kim Ye-sung
Women	Lee Gyu-ri	Lee Hyo-won	Kim Min-song

== Entries ==
A list of preliminary entries was published on December 27, 2024.

=== Senior ===
Men	Women	Ice dance
Cha Jun-hwan	Huh Ji-yu	Hannah Lim / Ye Quan
Cha Young-hyun	Hwang Jeong-yul	
Choi Ha-bin	Jang Ha-rin	
Kim Han-gil	Jeon Hyo-jin	
Kim Hyun-gyeom	Joo Hye-won	
Lee Jae-keun	Kim Chae-yeon	
Lee Si-hyeong	Kim Gun-hee	
Lim Ju-heon	Kim Ji-yu	
Seo Min-kyu	Kim Min-chae	
Yu Dong-han	Kim Seo-young	
	Kim Yu-jae	
Kim Yu-seong
Ko Na-yeon
Kim Yui
Lee Eun
Lee Hae-in
Lee Hyo-rin
Lee Ji-yoon
Park Eun-bi
Shin Ji-a
Song Si-woo
Wi Seo-yeong
Youn Seo-jin
Yu Na-young
Yun Ah-sun

=== Junior ===
Men	Women
Choi Ye-chang	Ahn So-young
Choi Ye-hwang	Cha Doi
Chung Jae-wook	Cho Hae-won
Kim Aaron	Cho Ha-yul
Kim Tae-hwan	Cho Se-rim
Kim Ye-sung	Choi Soi
Lee Ji-woo	Choi Ye-won
Lee Youn-ho	Jeong Sube-en
	Jun Ji-su
Keum Ah-ran
Kim Ga-eun
Kim Ga-heun
Kim Ha-yeon
Kim Min-jae
Kim Min-song
Kim Seo-yu
Kim Si-hyun
Kim Soo-hyun
Kim Yeo-na
Lee Bo-seul
Lee Gyu-ri
Lee Hyo-won
Lee Rae-in
Lee Ye-seo
Lee Yoon-seo
Lee Yu-eun
Lim Jeong-hyan
Nam Sae-bom
Park Gyu-gyung
Park Ha-young
Park Se-na
Seo Chae-eun
Son Min-chae

== Senior results ==
=== Senior men ===
Men's results
Rank	Name	Total points	SP		FS	
1	Cha Jun-hwan	281.02	1	90.53	1	190.49
2	Seo Min-kyu	246.78	5	79.18	2	167.60
3	Lee Si-hyeong	241.69	2	81.42	3	160.27
4	Kim Hyun-gyeom	240.25	3	81.30	4	158.95
5	Choi Ha-bin	238.97	4	80.49	5	158.48
6	Lee Jae-keun	231.24	6	74.90	6	156.34
7	Cha Young-hyun	211.09	7	68.79	7	142.30
8	Lim Ju-heon	188.54	9	64.21	8	124.33
9	Kim Han-gil	173.70	8	67.59	10	106.11
10	Yu Dong-han	172.56	10	55.01	9	117.55

=== Senior women ===
Women's results
Rank	Name	Total points	SP		FS	
1	Kim Chae-yeon	216.09	2	70.43	1	145.66
2	Shin Ji-a	214.15	1	72.08	2	142.07
3	Kim Yu-jae	193.92	3	67.76	5	126.16
4	Kim Yu-seong	192.52	5	63.08	3	129.44
5	Yun Ah-sun	188.15	6	61.90	4	126.25
6	Lee Hae-in	185.33	4	63.98	6	121.35
7	Ko Na-yeon	179.40	7	61.26	7	118.14
8	Huh Ji-yu	171.72	13	55.85	8	115.87
9	Kim Geon-hee	169.07	17	54.99	9	114.08
10	Wi Seo-yeong	168.39	9	58.57	10	109.82
11	Youn Seo-jin	167.84	8	59.58	11	108.26
12	Kim Ji-yu	162.61	10	58.26	14	104.35
13	Kim Seo-young	161.18	14	55.80	12	105.38
14	Lee Hyo-rin	159.51	12	57.15	16	102.36
15	Lee Ji-yoon	159.22	15	55.76	15	103.46
16	Joo Hye-won	157.49	11	57.44	18	100.05
17	Jang Ha-rin	155.41	20	50.04	13	105.37
18	Hwang Jeong-youl	152.30	18	51.57	17	100.73
19	Yu Na-yeong	142.09	19	50.59	19	91.50
20	Song Si-woo	133.01	21	49.94	20	83.07
21	Kim Min-chae	129.47	16	55.00	23	74.47
22	Park Eun-bi	121.09	22	42.04	21	79.05
23	Jeon Hyo-jin	114.54	23	37.68	22	76.86
WD	Kim Yui	withdrew	withdrew from competition			
WD	Lee Eun	withdrew	withdrew from competition			

=== Senior ice dance ===
Ice dance results
Rank	Name	Total points	RD		FD	
1	Hannah Lim / Ye Quan	175.00	1	68.62	1	106.38

== Junior results ==
=== Junior men ===
Junior men's results
Rank	Name	Total points	SP		FS	
1	Lee Yun-ho	163.62	2	52.31	1	111.31
2	Kim Aaron	156.75	1	54.35	2	102.40
3	Kim Ye-sung	141.21	4	45.98	3	95.23
4	Kim Tae-hwan	140.96	3	46.60	4	94.36
5	Chung Jae-wook	135.14	5	43.42	5	91.72
6	Choi Ye-hwang	106.43	6	34.76	6	71.67
7	Choi Ye-chang	96.26	7	33.81	7	62.45
WD	Lee Ji-woo	withdrew	withdrew from competition			

=== Junior women ===
Junior women's results
Rank	Name	Total points	SP		FS	
1	Lee Gyu-ri	165.50	1	55.99	1	109.51
2	Lee Hyo-won	159.34	3	52.15	2	107.19
3	Kim Mi-song	155.49	2	53.55	4	101.94
4	Doi Cha	154.49	5	51.91	3	102.58
5	Park Ha-young	147.73	6	51.74	5	95.99
6	Jeong Sube-en	141.79	4	52.12	7	89.67
7	Kim Ga-eun	134.87	8	44.75	6	90.12
8	Kim Soo-hyun	129.48	7	44.91	9	84.57
9	Lee Yoon-seo	124.51	16	39.28	8	85.23
10	Park Gyu-gyung	117.87	14	39.78	10	78.09
11	Lim Jeong-hyan	117.57	12	41.86	12	75.71
12	Lee Ye-seo	116.23	10	43.21	13	73.02
13	Son Min-chae	114.35	18	37.83	11	76.52
14	Kim Ha-yeon	113.77	9	43.42	14	70.35
15	Park Se-na	110.50	13	40.60	15	69.90
16	Kim Yeo-na	109.40	11	42.72	21	66.68
17	Kim Seo-yu	107.36	17	38.41	16	68.95
18	Nam Sae-bom	106.50	15	39.59	20	66.91
19	Lee Yu-eun	105.30	20	37.32	17	67.98
20	Cho Se-rim	104.34	22	36.58	18	67.76
21	Cho Ha-yul	101.31	19	37.64	24	63.67
22	Cho Hae-won	100.88	30	33.28	19	67.60
23	Jun Ji-su	100.48	28	34.13	22	66.35
24	Lee Rae-in	99.81	25	34.60	23	65.21
25	Ahn So-young	99.21	21	36.64	26	62.57
26	Choi Ye-won	97.61	23	35.44	27	62.17
27	Kim Ga-heun	97.25	27	34.45	25	62.80
28	Seo Chae-eun	92.30	29	33.38	28	58.92
29	Kim Si-hyun	89.74	26	34.57	29	55.17
30	Lee Bo-seul	89.74	24	35.28	30	54.46
Did not advance to free skating
31	Choi Soi	33.01	31	33.01	—N/a	
32	Kim Min-jae	28.60	32	28.60	—N/a	
WD	Keum Ah-ran	withdrew	withdrew from competition			

== International team selections ==
=== Winter World University Games ===
The 2025 Winter World University Games were held in Turin, Italy from January 13–23, 2025.

	Men	Women
1	Cha Jun-hwan	Choi Da-bin
2		Wi Seo-yeong
3	Cha Young-hyun	~~Kim Ye-lim~~ (withdrew)

=== Asian Winter Games ===
The 2025 Asian Winter Games were held in Harbin, China from February 7–14, 2025.

	Men	Women
1	Cha Jun-hwan	Kim Chae-yeon
2	Kim Hyun-gyeom	Kim Seo-young

=== Four Continents Championships ===
The 2025 Four Continents Championships were held in Seoul, South Korea from February 19–23, 2025.

	Men	Women	Ice dance
1	Cha Jun-hwan	Kim Chae-yeon	Hannah Lim / Ye Quan
2	Lee Si-hyeong	Yun Ah-sun	
3	Kim Hyun-gyeom	Lee Hae-in	

=== World Junior Championships ===
Commonly referred to as "Junior Worlds", the 2025 World Junior Championships were held in Debrecen, Hungary from February 25 – March 2, 2025.

	Men	Women
1	Seo Min-kyu	Shin Ji-a
2	Choi Ha-bin	Kim Yu-jae
3	Lee Jae-keun	

=== World Championships ===
The 2023 World Championships were held in Boston, Massachusetts, United States from March 25–30, 2025.

	Men	Women	Ice dance
1	Cha Jun-hwan	Kim Chae-yeon	Hannah Lim / Ye Quan
2	Lee Si-hyeong	Yun Ah-sun	
3		Lee Hae-in	
