= Cho Sung-man =

South Korean figure skating coach

- Hangul: 조성만
- RR: Jo Seongman
- MR: Cho Sŏngman

Cho Sung-man (Korean: 조성만) is a South Korean figure skating coach. He has coached skaters including Park Bit-na, Kim Na-young, and Park Yun-joon in both national and international competitions.

He currently serves as a coach and as Director of the Incheon Skating Federation. Cho has also been involved in a cultural skating exchange program with East West Ice Palace in Artesia, California. As part of this initiative, he has collaborated with coaches such as Jean Yun, Peter Oppegard, and Karen Kwan-Oppegard to provide South Korean skaters with training opportunities.
