= Lim Ju-heon =

South Korean figure skater (born 2005)

Personal information
- Native name: 임주헌
- Full name: Lim Ju-heon
- Born: September 22, 2005 (age 21) Seoul, South Korea
- Height: 1.69 m (5 ft 6 1/2 in)

Figure skating career
- Country: South Korea (since 2021); Canada (2019–20)
- Discipline: Men's singles
- Coach: Chi Hyun-jung; Kim Jin-seo
- Skating club: C&K Team
- Began skating: 2014

Lim Ju-heon (Korean: 임주헌; born September 22, 2005) is a South Korean figure skater. He is a two-time ISU Junior Grand Prix medalist and the 2023 CS Denis Ten Memorial Challenge champion.

== Personal life ==
Lim was born on September 22, 2005, in Seoul, South Korea. He moved to Ontario, Canada as a young child, before moving back to South Korea in 2020. Due to having spent most of his childhood in Canada, Lim is bilingual and able to communicate in both Korean and English fluently.

He is currently a student at Dankook University.

== Career ==
=== Early career ===
Lim began skating in 2014 while still living in Canada. Originally, Lim was interested in trying ice hockey, however, while attending a Canadian learn-to-skate program, CanSkate, one of the coaches convinced Lim to pursue figure skating as he appeared to be far more suited for the sport. Lim would then begin training at the Hamilton Skating Club, where he was coached by Bryce Davison and Jennifer Jackson.

He competed at the 2020 Canadian Junior Championships, where he finished sixth. Following the event, Lim broke his ankle and the COVID-19 pandemic had begun spreading to Canada. Due to the pandemic, all hospitals in Ontario had closed down and Lim was unable to access any rehabilitation centers. This prompted him to return to South Korea, where he would be able to receive medical treatment for his injury. Lim would ultimately decide to permanently remain in South Korea and represent the country. Choi Hyung-kyung would become his new coach.

Lim first began skating for South Korea during the 2021–22 figure skating season, finishing fourth at the 2022 South Korean Annual Ranking Competition and eighth at the 2022 South Korean Championships.

The following season, Lim placed eighth at the 2023 South Korean Annual Ranking Competition and ninth at the 2023 South Korean Championships. He was unable to compete internationally due to sustaining another broken ankle. Following the 2022–23 season, Lim switched coaches from Choi Hyung-kyung to Chi Hyun-jung and Kim Jin-seo became his new coaches.

=== 2023–2024 season ===
Competing at the 2023 South Korean ISU Junior Grand Prix Qualifiers, Lim finished third. Due to this placement, Lim was assigned to two events on the 2023–24 ISU Junior Grand Prix circuit. He won the silver medal at 2023 JGP Japan and gold at 2023 JGP Poland. These results allowed Lim to qualify for the 2023–24 Junior Grand Prix Final in Beijing, China. He then went on to compete on the senior level at the 2023 CS Denis Ten Memorial Challenge, where he won the gold medal. He subsequently competed at the South Korean Annual Ranking Competition, placing fifth.

At the Junior Grand Prix Final placed second in the short program but fourth in the free skater, dropping to fourth place overall. Going on to compete at the 2024 South Korean Championships, Lim placed eighth.

Getting selected as one of the three men's singles skaters to represent South Korea at the 2024 Four Continents Championships in Shanghai, China, Lim would finish thirteenth.

=== 2024–2025 season ===
Lim started the season by competing at the 2024 CS Lombardia Trophy, where he finished eighth. Making his senior Grand Prix series debut, Lim finished twelfth at the 2024 NHK Trophy. Two weeks following that event, he would finish ninth at the annual South Korean Ranking Competition. Lim subsequently placed eighth at the 2025 South Korean Championships.

=== 2025–2026 season ===
Lim started the season by competing at the 2025 CS Cranberry Cup International and the 2025 CS Nebelhorn Trophy, finishing fifteenth at both events.

== Programs ==
Season	Short program	Free skating
2025–2026	Fall on Me by Andrea Bocelli & Matteo Bocelli choreo. by Leonid Sviridenko	Arcane; Guns for Hire; To Ashes and Blood by Woodkid choreo. by Leonid Sviridenko
2024–2025	Waves by Dean Lewis choreo. by Misha Ge	Interstellar (Original Score) by Hans Zimmer performed by Imperial Orchestra choreo. by Jeffrey Buttle
2023–2024	Your Song (from Moulin Rouge!) performed by Ewan McGregor, Patrick Leonard, & Craig Armstrong choreo. by Shin Yea-ji	Game of Thrones; Arrival at Winterfell; Game of Thrones; Jenny of Oldstones; Game of Thrones (Kshmr & The Golden Army Remix) by Ramin Djawadi choreo. by Misha Ge
2022–2023	Your Song (from Moulin Rouge!) performed by Ewan McGregor, Patrick Leonard, & Craig Armstrong choreo. by Shin Yea-ji	The Shawshank Redemption; Shawshank Redemption; So Was Red; End Title by Thomas Newman choreo. by Shin Yea-ji
2021–2022	Your Song (from Moulin Rouge!) performed by Ewan McGregor, Patrick Leonard, & Craig Armstrong choreo. by Shin Yea-ji	The Matrix Revolutions; Tetsujin; Trinity Definitely; Navras by Juno Reactor & Don Davis choreo. by Shin Yea-ji
2019–20	The Last Tango by James Dooley	Fantasy for Violin and Orchestra by Jeff Rona

== Competitive highlights ==
=== For South Korea ===
- GP – Event of the ISU Grand Prix Series
- JGP – Event of the ISU Junior Grand Prix Series
- CS – Event of the ISU Challenger Series
- TBD – Assigned
- WD – Withdrew from competition

Competition placements at senior level
Season	2021–22	2022–23	2023–24	2024–25	2025–26	2026–27
Four Continents Championships			13th			
South Korean Championships	8th	9th	8th	8th		
GP NHK Trophy				12th		
CS Cranberry Cup					15th	
CS Denis Ten Memorial Challenge			1st			
CS Lombardia Trophy				8th		
CS Nebelhorn Trophy					15th	
CS Kinoshita Group Cup						WD

Competition placements at junior level
Season	2023–24
Junior Grand Prix Final	4th
JGP Japan	2nd
JGP Poland	1st

== Detailed results ==
ISU personal best scores in the +5/-5 GOE System
Segment	Type	Score	Event
Total	TSS	234.86	2023 CS Denis Ten Memorial Challenge
Short program	TSS	76.52	2023 CS Denis Ten Memorial Challenge
Short program	TES	40.90	2023 JGP Poland
Short program	PCS	36.32	2023 CS Denis Ten Memorial Challenge
Free skating	TSS	158.34	2023 CS Denis Ten Memorial Challenge
Free skating	TES	82.09	2023 CS Denis Ten Memorial Challenge
Free skating	PCS	76.25	2023 CS Denis Ten Memorial Challenge

=== Senior results ===
Small medals for short and free programs awarded only at ISU Championships.

Results in the 2025–26 season
Date	Event	SP		FS		Total	
Date	Event	P	Score	P	Score	P	Score
Aug 7–10, 2025	(United States) 2025 CS Cranberry Cup International	16	56.83	15	105.06	15	161.89
Sep 25–27, 2025	(Germany) 2025 CS Nebelhorn Trophy	15	54.51	12	118.14	15	171.55

2024–25 season
Date	Event	SP	FS	Total
January 2–5, 2025	2025 South Korean Championships	9; 64.21	8; 124.33	8; 188.54
November 8–10, 2024	2024 NHK Trophy	12; 74.31	12; 121.74	12; 196.05
September 13–15, 2024	2024 CS Lombardia Trophy	10; 66.26	8; 149.28	8; 215.54
2023–24 season
Date	Event	SP	FS	Total
January 30–February 4, 2024	2024 Four Continents Championships	13; 70.27	12; 141.13	13; 211.40
January 4–7, 2024	2024 South Korean Championships	4; 77.72	8; 136.84	8; 214.56
November 1–4, 2024	2023 CS Denis Ten Memorial Challenge	2; 76.52	1; 158.34	1; 234.86
2022–23 season
Date	Event	SP	FS	Total
January 5–8, 2023	2023 South Korean Championships	6; 72.33	10; 123.09	9; 195.42
2021–22 season
Date	Event	SP	FS	Total
January 7–9, 2023	2022 South Korean Championships	8; 64.39	5; 134.28	8; 198.67

=== Junior results ===
2023–24 season
Date	Event	SP	FS	Total
December 7–10, 2023	2023–24 Junior Grand Prix Final	2; 73.72	4; 136.27	4; 209.99
September 27–30, 2023	2023 JGP Poland	1; 76.08	1; 145.47	1; 221.55
September 13–16, 2023	2023 JGP Japan	1; 75.38	2; 142.57	2; 217.95
2019–20 season
Date	Event	SP	FS	Total
January 13–19, 2020	2020 Canadian Championships (Junior)	5; 60.76	5; 115.80	6; 176.56
