= 2024–25 ISU Junior Grand Prix =

Figure skating competition series

- Type: ISU Junior Grand Prix
- Date: August 28 – December 10, 2024
- Season: 2024–25
- Previous: 2023–24 ISU Junior Grand Prix
- Next: 2025–26 ISU Junior Grand Prix

The 2024–25 ISU Junior Grand Prix was a series of junior international competitions organized by the International Skating Union that were held from August 2024 through December 2024. It was the junior-level complement to the 2024–25 ISU Grand Prix of Figure Skating. Medals were awarded in men's singles, women's singles, pair skating, and ice dance. Skaters earned points based on their placement at each event, and the top six in each discipline qualified to compete at the 2024–25 Junior Grand Prix Final in Grenoble, France.

== Competitions ==
The locations of the JGP events change annually. One event was to be held in Épinal, France, but was withdrawn by the French Federation of Ice Sports and the spot re-allocated to Wuxi, China. Additionally, the Junior Grand Prix Final was originally to be held in Orléans, France, but the French Federation of Ice Sports relocated the event to Grenoble. This season, the series included the following events.

| Date | Event | Location | Notes | Ref. |
|---|---|---|---|---|
| August 28–31 | 2024 JGP Latvia | Riga, Latvia | | |
| September 4–7 | 2024 JGP Czech Republic | Ostrava, Czech Republic | | |
| September 11–14 | 2024 JGP Thailand | Bangkok, Thailand | No pairs | |
| September 18–21 | 2024 JGP Turkey | Ankara, Turkey | | |
| September 25–28 | 2024 JGP Poland | Gdańsk, Poland | | |
| October 2–5 | 2024 JGP Slovenia | Ljubljana, Slovenia | No pairs | |
| October 9–12 | 2024 JGP China | Wuxi, China | No pairs | |
| December 5–8 | (France) 2024–25 Junior Grand Prix Final | Grenoble, France | | |

== Entries ==
Skaters who reach the age of 13 before July 1, 2024, but have not turned 19, (singles skaters), 22 (female pairs or ice dance skaters), or 24 (male pairs or ice dance skaters) will be eligible to compete on the junior circuit. Competitors are chosen by their countries according to their federations' selection procedures. The number of entries allotted to each ISU member federation is determined by their skaters' placements at the 2024 World Junior Championships in each discipline.

=== Number of entries per discipline ===
Based on the results of the 2024 World Junior Championships, each ISU member nation was allowed to field the following number of entries per event.

Singles and ice dance
| Entries | Men | Women | Ice dance |
|---|---|---|---|
| Two entries in seven events | South Korea; Japan; Slovakia | Japan; South Korea; Finland | United States; Israel; Germany |
| One entry in seven events | France; Estonia; Canada | Switzerland; Italy; United States | France; Canada; Italy |
| One entry in six events | Great Britain; United States; Poland; New Zealand | France; Canada; Estonia; Georgia | Cyprus; Japan; Great Britain; Switzerland |
| One entry in five events | Sweden; Chinese Taipei; Italy; Israel; Georgia; Hungary; Finland; Ukraine | Thailand; Hungary; Israel; Chinese Taipei; Poland | Ukraine; South Korea; Belgium; Poland; Czech Republic |
| One entry in four events | Latvia; Lithuania; Turkey; Switzerland; Germany | Germany; Australia; Sweden; Slovenia; Slovakia; Kyrgyzstan | Armenia; Georgia; Finland; Turkey |
| One entry in three events | Kazakhstan; Malaysia; Norway; Slovenia; Bulgaria; Armenia; Spain; Hong Kong | Austria; Latvia; Netherlands; Kazakhstan; Bulgaria; Croatia; Ukraine; South Africa; Lithuania; Hong Kong; Azerbaijan; Turkey; Norway; Mexico; Philippines; Great Britain | Austria; Spain; Brazil; Estonia |

- If not listed above, one entry in two events is allowed.
- Host federations may enter up to three spots per discipline.

Pairs
| Entries | Pairs |
|---|---|
| Three entries in four events | Georgia; United States; Italy; Canada |
| Two entries in four events | Ukraine; Czech Republic; France; Israel; Hungary; Slovakia; Japan; Germany |

- If not listed above, one entry in three events is allowed.
- Host federations have an unlimited number of entries.

== Medal summary ==
=== Men's singles ===
| Competition | Gold | Silver | Bronze | Ref. |
|---|---|---|---|---|
| JGP Latvia | (Japan) Sena Takahashi | (South Korea) Lee Jae-keun | (Japan) Shunsuke Nakamura | |
| JGP Czech Republic | (South Korea) Seo Min-kyu | (United States) Patrick Blackwell | (Slovakia) Adam Hagara | |
| JGP Thailand | (New Zealand) Yanhao Li | (Japan) Rio Nakata | (China) Tian Tonghe | |
| JGP Turkey | (United States) Jacob Sanchez | (Japan) Shunsuke Nakamura | (Estonia) Arlet Levandi | |
| JGP Poland | (Slovakia) Lukáš Václavík | (Japan) Sena Takahashi | (South Korea) Seo Min-kyu | |
| JGP Slovenia | (United States) Jacob Sanchez | (Slovakia) Adam Hagara | (Germany) Genrikh Gartung | |
| JGP China | (Japan) Rio Nakata | (China) Tian Tonghe | (New Zealand) Yanhao Li | |
| (France) Junior Grand Prix Final | (United States) Jacob Sanchez | (South Korea) Seo Min-kyu | (Japan) Rio Nakata | |

=== Women's singles ===
| Competition | Gold | Silver | Bronze | Ref. |
|---|---|---|---|---|
| JGP Latvia | (Japan) Mao Shimada | (Estonia) Elina Goidina | (South Korea) Ko Na-yeon | |
| JGP Czech Republic | (Japan) Kaoruko Wada | (France) Stefania Gladki | (South Korea) Kim Yu-jae | |
| JGP Thailand | (China) Wang Yihan | (Japan) Yo Takagi | (Japan) Mei Okada | |
| JGP Turkey | (South Korea) Kim Yu-seong | (Japan) Ami Nakai | (France) Stefania Gladki | |
| JGP Poland | (Japan) Mao Shimada | (Japan) Kaoruko Wada | (South Korea) Ko Na-yeon | |
| JGP Slovenia | (United States) Sophie Joline von Felten | (South Korea) Shin Ji-a | (Japan) Mei Okada | |
| JGP China | (Japan) Ami Nakai | (South Korea) Kim Yu-seong | (China) Wang Yihan | |
| (France) Junior Grand Prix Final | (Japan) Mao Shimada | (Japan) Kaoruko Wada | (Japan) Ami Nakai | |

=== Pairs ===
| Competition | Gold | Silver | Bronze | Ref. |
|---|---|---|---|---|
| JGP Latvia | (China); Zhang Jiaxuan; Huang Yihang | (Canada); Jazmine Desrochers; Kieran Thrasher | (United States); Olivia Flores; Luke Wang | |
| JGP Czech Republic | (China); Zhang Xuanqi; Feng Wenqiang | (France); Romane Télémaque; Lucas Coulon | (Canada); Julia Quattrocchi; Simon Desmarais | |
| JGP Turkey | (Canada); Jazmine Desrochers; Kieran Thrasher | (United States); Olivia Flores; Luke Wang | (Japan); Sae Shimizu; Lucas Tsuyoshi Honda | |
| JGP Poland | (China); Zhang Jiaxuan; Huang Yihang | (Ukraine); Sofiia Holichenko; Artem Darenskyi | (Canada); Julia Quattrochi; Simon Desmaris | |
| (France) Junior Grand Prix Final | (China); Zhang Jiaxuan; Huang Yihang | (United States); Olivia Flores; Luke Wang | (Canada); Jazmine Desrochers; Kieran Thrasher | |

=== Ice dance ===
| Competition | Gold | Silver | Bronze | Ref. |
|---|---|---|---|---|
| JGP Latvia | (Italy); Noemi Maria Tali; Noah Lafornara | (United States); Caroline Mullen; Brendan Mullen | (Germany); Darya Grimm; Michail Savitskiy | |
| JGP Czech Republic | (France); Célina Fradji; Jean-Hans Fourneaux | (United States); Katarina Wolfkostin; Dimitry Tsarevski | (Canada); Layla Veillon; Alexander Brandys | |
| JGP Thailand | (Italy); Noemi Maria Tali; Noah Lafornara | (United States); Hana Maria Aboian; Daniil Veselukhin | (United States); Elliana Peal; Ethan Peal | |
| JGP Turkey | (Germany); Darya Grimm; Michail Savitskiy | (Ukraine); Iryna Pidgaina; Artem Koval | (United States); Hana Maria Aboian; Daniil Veselukhin | |
| JGP Poland | (United States); Katarina Wolfkostin; Dimitry Tsarevski | (Canada); Sandrine Gauthier; Quentin Thieren | (France); Dania Mouaden; Théo Bigot | |
| JGP Slovenia | (Ukraine); Iryna Pidgaina; Artem Koval | (France); Célina Fradji; Jean-Hans Fourneaux | (United States); Caroline Mullen; Brendan Mullen | |
| JGP China | (United States); Elliana Peal; Ethan Peal | (France); Ambre Perrier Gianesini; Samuel Blanc Klaperman | (Canada); Chloe Nguyen; Brendan Giang | |
| (France) Junior Grand Prix Final | (Italy); Noemi Maria Tali; Noah Lafornara | (United States); Katarina Wolfkostin; Dimitry Tsarevski | (Germany); Darya Grimm; Michail Savitskiy | |

=== Medal table ===
| Rank | Nation | Gold | Silver | Bronze | Total |
|---|---|---|---|---|---|
| 1 | Japan | 7 | 7 | 6 | 20 |
| 2 | United States | 6 | 7 | 4 | 17 |
| 3 | China | 5 | 1 | 2 | 8 |
| 4 | Italy | 3 | 0 | 0 | 3 |
| 5 | South Korea | 2 | 4 | 4 | 10 |
| 6 | France | 1 | 4 | 2 | 7 |
| 7 | Canada | 1 | 2 | 5 | 8 |
| 8 | Ukraine | 1 | 2 | 0 | 3 |
| 9 | Slovakia | 1 | 1 | 1 | 3 |
| 10 | Germany | 1 | 0 | 3 | 4 |
| 11 | New Zealand | 1 | 0 | 1 | 2 |
| 12 | Estonia | 0 | 1 | 1 | 2 |
| Totals (12 entries) | | 29 | 29 | 29 | 87 |

== Qualification ==
At each event, skaters earn points toward qualification for the Junior Grand Prix Final. Following the seventh event, the top six highest-scoring skaters/teams advance to the Final. The points earned per placement are as follows:

| Placement | Singles | Pairs/Ice dance |
|---|---|---|
| 1st | 15 | 15 |
| 2nd | 13 | 13 |
| 3rd | 11 | 11 |
| 4th | 9 | 9 |
| 5th | 7 | 7 |
| 6th | 5 | 5 |
| 7th | 4 | 4 |
| 8th | 3 | 3 |
| 9th | 2 | —N/a |
| 10th | 1 | —N/a |

There were originally seven tie-breakers in cases of a tie in overall points:

1. Highest placement at an event. If a skater placed 1st and 3rd, the tiebreaker is the 1st place, and that beats a skater who placed 2nd in both events.
2. Highest combined total scores in both events. If a skater earned 200 points at one event and 250 at a second, that skater would win in the second tie-break over a skater who earned 200 points at one event and 150 at another.
3. Participated in two events.
4. Highest combined scores in the free skating/free dance portion of both events.
5. Highest individual score in the free skating/free dance portion from one event.
6. Highest combined scores in the short program/short dance of both events.
7. Highest number of total participants at the events.

If a tie remained, it was considered unbreakable and the tied skaters all advanced to the Junior Grand Prix Final.

=== Qualification standings ===
| Pts. | Men | Women | Pairs | Ice dance |
|---|---|---|---|---|
| 30 | (United States); Jacob Sanchez | (Japan); Mao Shimada | (China); Zhang Jiaxuan; Huang Yihang | (Italy); Noemi Maria Tali; Noah Lafornara |
| 28 | (Japan); Rio Nakata | (Japan); Ami Nakai | (Canada); Jazmine Desrochers; Kieran Thrasher | (Ukraine); Iryna Pidgaina; Artem Koval |
| 28 | (Japan); Sena Takahashi | (Japan); Kaoruko Wada | —N/a | (France); Célina Fradji; Jean-Hans Fourneaux |
| 28 | —N/a | (South Korea); Kim Yu-seong | —N/a | (United States); Katarina Wolfkostin; Dimitry Tsarevski |
| 26 | (New Zealand); Yanhao Li | (China); Wang Yihan | —N/a | (Germany); Darya Grimm; Michail Savitskiy |
| 26 | (South Korea); Seo Min-kyu | —N/a | —N/a | (United States); Elliana Peal; Ethan Peal |
| 24 | (Slovakia); Lukáš Václavík | (France); Stefania Gladki | (United States); Olivia Flores; Luke Wang | (United States); Caroline Mullen; Brendan Mullen |
| 24 | (Slovakia); Adam Hagara | —N/a | —N/a | (United States); Hana Maria Aboian; Daniil Veselukhin |
| 24 | (China); Tian Tonghe | —N/a | —N/a | —N/a |
| 24 | (Japan); Shunsuke Nakamura | —N/a | —N/a | —N/a |
| 22 | (South Korea); Lee Jae-keun | (South Korea); Shin Ji-a | (France); Romane Télémaque; Lucas Coulon | (France); Ambre Perrier Gianesini; Samuel Blanc Klaperman |
| 22 | —N/a | (Japan); Mei Okada | (Canada); Julia Quattrocchi; Simon Desmarais | —N/a |
| 22 | —N/a | (South Korea); Ko Na-yeon | —N/a | —N/a |
| 20 | —N/a | (Japan); Yo Takagi | (Japan); Sae Shimizu; Lucas Tsuyoshi Honda | (Canada); Sandrine Gauthier; Quentin Thieren |
| 20 | —N/a | —N/a | —N/a | (Canada); Chloe Nguyen; Brendan Giang |
| 18 | (United States); Patrick Blackwell | (Estonia); Elina Goidina | —N/a | (France); Dania Mouaden; Théo Bigot |
| 18 | (Israel); Tamir Kuperman | (Japan); Rena Uezono | —N/a | (France); Louise Bordet; Martin Chardain |
| 16 | (Germany); Genrikh Gartung | (Italy); Anna Pezzetta | (France); Louise Ehrhard; Matthis Pellegris | (Canada); Layla Veillon; Alexander Brandys |
| 16 | (Estonia); Arlet Levandi | —N/a | (United States); Elizabeth Hansen; William Church | —N/a |
| 16 | (Israel); Nikita Sheiko | —N/a | —N/a | —N/a |
| 15 | —N/a | (United States); Sophie Joline von Felten | (China); Zhang Xuanqi; Feng Wenqiang | —N/a |
| 15 | —N/a | (South Korea); Kim Yu-jae | —N/a | —N/a |
| 14 | —N/a | —N/a | —N/a | (Switzerland); Gina Zehnder; Beda Leon Sieber |
| 13 | —N/a | —N/a | (Ukraine); Sofiia Holichenko; Artem Darenskyi | (United States); Olivia Ilin; Dylan Cain |
| 12 | (Japan); Haru Kakiuchi | (Georgia (country)); Inga Gurgenidze | —N/a | (France); Alisa Ovsiankina; Maximilien Rahier |
| 12 | (South Korea); Choi Ha-bin | (Switzerland); Leandra Tzimpoukakis | —N/a | —N/a |
| 11 | (Canada); David Bondar | (Finland); Iida Karhunen | —N/a | —N/a |
| 10 | (Canada); Anthony Paradis | (Slovakia); Alica Lengyelová | (Italy); Polina Polman; Gabriel Renoldi | (United Kingdom); Ashlie Slatter; Atl Ongay-Perez |
| 9 | (Switzerland); Ean Weiler | (Canada); Lulu Lin | (Spain); Claudia Sinclair Scotti; Noah Quesada Grau | (Italy); Laura Finelli; Massimiliano Bucciarelli |
| 9 | —N/a | (China); Jin Shuxian | —N/a | (Austria); Anita Straub; Andreas Straub |
| 9 | —N/a | (Kazakhstan); Sofia Samodelkina | —N/a | (Japan); Sara Kishimoto; Atsuhiko Tamura |
| 9 | —N/a | —N/a | —N/a | (France); Eva Bernard; Amedeo Bonetto |
| 9 | —N/a | —N/a | —N/a | —N/a |
| 8 | (Canada); Grayson Long | (South Korea); Hwang Jeong-yul | —N/a | —N/a |
| 7 | (Japan); Daiya Ebihara | (United States); Josephine Lee | (Italy); Irina Napolitano; Eduardo Comi | (Poland); Sofiia Dovhal; Wiktor Kulesza |
| 7 | (United States); Taira Shinohara | (Japan); Ikura Kushida | (United States); Saya Carpenter; Ignacio Maravilla | (United States); Yahli Pedersen; Benjamin Starr |
| 7 | (Canada); William Chan | (Germany); Anna Gerke | —N/a | —N/a |
| 7 | (Canada); John Kim | (Switzerland); Anastasia Brandenburg | —N/a | —N/a |
| 6 | (Ukraine); Yehor Kurtsev | (Australia); Hana Bath | —N/a | (Belgium); Sofiia Beznosikova; Max Leleu |
| 5 | (Lithuania); Luka Imedashvili | —N/a | (Israel); Sofia Enkina; Nikita Kovalenko | (Germany); Lilia Schubert; Nikita Remeshevskiy |
| 5 | (Japan); Taiga Nishino | —N/a | (United States); Reagan Moss; Jakub Galbavy | (Canada); Auréa Cinçon-Debout; Earl Jesse Celestino |
| 5 | —N/a | —N/a | (Czech Republic); Debora Anna Cohen; Lukáš Vochozka | (Japan); Kaho Yamashita; Yuto Nagata |
| 4 | (France); Ilia Gogitidze | (Chinese Taipei); Tsai Yu-Feng | (Canada); Noemie Rolland; Etienne Lacasse | (Canada); Summer Homick; Nicholas Buelow |
| 4 | (United States); Aleksandr Fegan | (Estonia); Maria Eliise Kaljuvere | (United States); Addyson McDanold; Aaron Felberbaum | (France); Louise Duprat; Tahory Taddei-Dugue |
| 4 | (Hong Kong); Li Jiarui | (China); Gao Shiqi | —N/a | (United States); Emily Renzi; William Lissauer |
| 3 | (Finland); Matias Lindfors | (Netherlands); Angel Delevaque | (Germany); Katalin Janne Salatzki; Lukas Röseler | (Italy); Vittoria Petracchi; Daniel Basile |
| 3 | (France); Gianni Motilla | (Finland); Venla Sinisalo | (Hungary); Nora Marleen Rothenbühler; Mózes József Berei | (Canada); Rachel Martins; Juel Kowalczyk |
| 3 | (Sweden); Hugo Bostedt | (South Korea); Youn Seo-jin | —N/a | (Japan); Sumire Yoshida; Ibuki Ogahara |
| 3 | (China); Zhao Qihan | (United States); Logan Higase-Chen | —N/a | —N/a |
| 3 | (Kazakhstan); Nikita Krivosheyev | (United States); Annika Chao | —N/a | —N/a |
| 3 | —N/a | (Switzerland); Elisabeth Dibbern | —N/a | —N/a |
| 2 | (Ukraine); Vadym Novikov | (Israel); Simona Tkachman | —N/a | |
| 2 | (South Korea); Park Hyun-seo | (Israel); Sophia Shifrin | —N/a | |
| 2 | (United Kingdom); Tao Macrae | (Latvia); Kira Baranovska | —N/a | |
| 2 | (United Kingdom); Lloyd Thomson | (Canada); Megan Woodley | —N/a | |
| 2 | (Switzerland); Aurélian Chervet | (Italy); Sarina Joos | —N/a | |
| 1 | (Poland); Jakub Lofek | (Canada); Hetty Shi | —N/a | |
| 1 | (Kazakhstan); Artur Smagulov | (Switzerland); Olivia Bacsa | —N/a | |
| 1 | (Bulgaria); Deyan Mihaylov | (United States); Emilia Nemirovsky | —N/a | |
| 1 | (Italy); Raffaele Francesco Zich | —N/a | —N/a | |
| 1 | (Turkey); Furkan Emre İncel | —N/a | —N/a | |
| 1 | (Hong Kong); Jarvis Ho | —N/a | —N/a | |
| 1 | (Israel); Kirill Sheiko | —N/a | —N/a | |

=== Qualifiers ===
| No. | Men | Women | Pairs | Ice dance |
|---|---|---|---|---|
| 1 | (United States); Jacob Sanchez | (Japan); Mao Shimada | (China); Zhang Jiaxuan; Huang Yihang | (Italy); Noemi Maria Tali; Noah Lafornara |
| 2 | (Japan); Rio Nakata | (Japan); Ami Nakai | (Canada); Jazmine Desrochers; Kieran Thrasher | (Ukraine); Iryna Pidgaina; Artem Koval |
| 3 | (Japan); Sena Takahashi | (Japan); Kaoruko Wada | (United States); Olivia Flores; Luke Wang | (France); Célina Fradji; Jean-Hans Fourneaux |
| 4 | (New Zealand); Yanhao Li | (South Korea); Kim Yu-seong | (France); Romane Télémaque; Lucas Coulon | (United States); Katarina Wolfkostin; Dimitry Tsarevski |
| 5 | (South Korea); Seo Min-kyu | (China); Wang Yihan | (Canada); Julia Quattrocchi; Simon Desmarais | (Germany); Darya Grimm; Michail Savitskiy |
| 6 | (Slovakia); Lukáš Václavík | (France); Stefania Gladki | (Japan); Sae Shimizu; Lucas Tsuyoshi Honda | (United States); Elliana Peal; Ethan Peal |

Alternates

| No. | Men | Women | Pairs | Ice dance |
|---|---|---|---|---|
| 1 | (Slovakia); Adam Hagara | (South Korea); Shin Ji-a | (France); Louise Ehrhard; Matthis Pellegris | (United States); Caroline Mullen; Brendan Mullen |
| 2 | (China); Tian Tonghe | (Japan); Mei Okada | (United States); Elizabeth Hansen; William Church | (United States); Hana Maria Aboian; Daniil Veselukhin |
| 3 | (Japan); Shunsuke Nakamura | (South Korea); Ko Na-yeon | (China); Zhang Xuanqi; Feng Wenqiang | (France); Ambre Perrier Gianesini; Samuel Blanc Klaperman |

== Records and achievements ==
- At the JGP Thailand, Yanhao Li won New Zealand's first ISU Junior Grand Prix gold medal in any discipline.
- At the JGP Thailand, Wang Yihan became the first Chinese woman to win a Junior Grand Prix title.

== Top scores ==
=== Men's singles ===
Top 10 best scores in the men's combined total
| No. | Skater | Nation | Score | Event |
|---|---|---|---|---|
| 1 | Rio Nakata | Japan | 233.53 | 2024 JGP China |
| 2 | Yanhao Li | New Zealand | 230.09 | 2024 JGP Thailand |
| 3 | Sena Takahashi | Japan | 229.66 | 2024 JGP Latvia |
| 4 | Jacob Sanchez | United States | 229.46 | 2024 JGP Slovenia |
| 5 | Seo Min-kyu | South Korea | 224.78 | 2024 JGP Czech Republic |
| 6 | Patrick Blackwell | United States | 221.56 | 2024 JGP Czech Republic |
| 7 | Lee Jae-keun | South Korea | 220.26 | 2024 JGP Latvia |
| 8 | Adam Hagara | Slovakia | 217.43 | 2024 JGP Slovenia |
| 9 | Shunsuke Nakamura | Japan | 212.73 | 2024 JGP Latvia |
| 10 | Tamir Kuperman | Israel | 210.47 | 2024 JGP Czech Republic |

Top 10 best scores in the men's short program
| No. | Skater | Nation | Score | Event |
|---|---|---|---|---|
| 1 | Jacob Sanchez | United States | 85.09 | 2024 JGP Slovenia |
| 2 | Yanhao Li | New Zealand | 83.25 | 2024 JGP Thailand |
| 3 | Rio Nakata | Japan | 81.55 | 2024 JGP China |
| 4 | Sena Takahashi | Japan | 81.05 | 2024 JGP Latvia |
| 5 | Adam Hagara | Slovakia | 80.90 | 2024 JGP Slovenia |
| 6 | Taiga Nishino | Japan | 77.20 | 2024 JGP Czech Republic |
| 7 | Seo Min-kyu | South Korea | 77.08 | 2024 JGP Czech Republic |
| 8 | Nikita Sheiko | Israel | 75.61 | 2024 JGP Latvia |
| 9 | Shunsuke Nakamura | Japan | 75.59 | 2024 JGP Turkey |
| 10 | Tamir Kuperman | Israel | 75.58 | 2024 JGP Poland |

Top 10 best scores in the men's free skating
| No. | Skater | Nation | Score | Event |
|---|---|---|---|---|
| 1 | Patrick Blackwell | United States | 152.14 | 2024 JGP Czech Republic |
| 2 | Rio Nakata | Japan | 151.98 | 2024 JGP China |
| 3 | Sena Takahashi | Japan | 148.61 | 2024 JGP Latvia |
| 4 | Seo Min-kyu | South Korea | 147.70 | 2024 JGP Czech Republic |
| 5 | Yanhao Li | New Zealand | 146.84 | 2024 JGP Thailand |
| 6 | Lee Jae-keun | South Korea | 146.48 | 2024 JGP Latvia |
| 7 | Jacob Sanchez | United States | 144.37 | 2024 JGP Slovenia |
| 8 | Shunsuke Nakamura | Japan | 144.34 | 2024 JGP Latvia |
| 9 | Genrikh Gartung | Germany | 139.86 | 2024 JGP Slovenia |
| 10 | Tian Tonghe | China | 139.61 | 2024 JGP Thailand |

=== Women's singles ===
Top 10 best scores in the women's combined total
| No. | Skater | Nation | Score | Event |
|---|---|---|---|---|
| 1 | Mao Shimada | Japan | 224.68 | 2024 JGP Poland |
| 2 | Ami Nakai | Japan | 204.88 | 2024 JGP China |
| 3 | Kim Yu-seong | South Korea | 198.63 | 2024 JGP Turkey |
| 4 | Kaoruko Wada | Japan | 198.22 | 2024 JGP Poland |
| 5 | Sophie Joline von Felten | United States | 197.41 | 2024 JGP Slovenia |
| 6 | Wang Yihan | China | 194.71 | 2024 JGP Thailand |
| 7 | Shin Ji-a | South Korea | 193.04 | 2024 JGP Slovenia |
| 8 | Mei Okada | Japan | 190.93 | 2024 JGP Slovenia |
| 9 | Jin Shuxian | China | 189.89 | 2024 JGP China |
| 10 | Yo Takagi | Japan | 188.54 | 2024 JGP Thailand |

Top 10 best scores in the women's short program
| No. | Skater | Nation | Score | Event |
|---|---|---|---|---|
| 1 | Mao Shimada | Japan | 73.72 | 2024-25 Junior Grand Prix Final |
| 2 | Kaoruko Wada | Japan | 70.58 | 2024 JGP Poland |
| 3 | Shin Ji-a | South Korea | 69.24 | 2024 JGP Slovenia |
| 4 | Ami Nakai | Japan | 68.66 | 2024 JGP China |
| 5 | Mei Okada | Japan | 68.34 | 2024 JGP Slovenia |
| 6 | Anna Pezzetta | Italy | 67.14 | 2024 JGP Slovenia |
| 7 | Sophie Joline von Felten | United States | 66.65 | 2024 JGP Slovenia |
| 8 | Ikura Kushida | Japan | 66.36 | 2024 JGP Latvia |
| 9 | Yo Takagi | Japan | 66.03 | 2024 JGP China |
| 10 | Ko Na-yeon | South Korea | 65.58 | 2024 JGP Poland |

Top 10 best scores in the women's free skating
| No. | Skater | Nation | Score | Event |
|---|---|---|---|---|
| 1 | Mao Shimada | Japan | 151.57 | 2024 JGP Poland |
| 2 | Ami Nakai | Japan | 136.22 | 2024 JGP China |
| 3 | Kim Yu-seong | South Korea | 133.91 | 2024 JGP Turkey |
| 4 | Sophie Joline von Felten | United States | 130.76 | 2024 JGP Slovenia |
| 5 | Wang Yihan | China | 129.32 | 2024 JGP Thailand |
| 6 | Inga Gurgenidze | Georgia | 128.69 | 2024 JGP China |
| 7 | Kaoruko Wada | Japan | 127.64 | 2024 JGP Poland |
| 8 | Jin Shuxian | China | 126.94 | 2024 JGP China |
| 9 | Shin Ji-a | South Korea | 123.80 | 2024 JGP Slovenia |
| 10 | Yo Takagi | Japan | 123.55 | 2024 JGP Thailand |

=== Pairs ===
Top 10 best scores in the pairs' combined total
| No. | Team | Nation | Score | Event |
|---|---|---|---|---|
| 1 | Zhang Jiaxuan; Huang Yihang | China | 161.96 | 2024 JGP Poland |
| 2 | Jazmine Desrochers; Kieran Thrasher | Canada | 159.77 | 2024 JGP Turkey |
| 3 | Olivia Flores; Luke Wang | United States | 147.80 | 2024 JGP Turkey |
| 4 | Zhang Xuanqi; Feng Wenqiang | China | 145.55 | 2024 JGP Czech Republic |
| 5 | Sae Shimizu; Lucas Tsuyoshi Honda | Japan | 140.19 | 2024 JGP Turkey |
| 6 | Romane Telemaque; Lucas Coulon | France | 139.84 | 2024 JGP Czech Republic |
| 7 | Julia Quattrocchi; Simon Desmaris | Canada | 137.54 | 2024 JGP Czech Republic |
| 8 | Sofiia Holichenko; Artem Darenskyi | Ukraine | 136.58 | 2024 JGP Poland |
| 9 | Elizabeth Hansen; William Church | United States | 132.44 | 2024 JGP Poland |
| 10 | Polina Polman; Gabriel Renoldi | Italy | 132.06 | 2024 JGP Czech Republic |

Top 10 best scores in the pairs' short program
| No. | Team | Nation | Score | Event |
|---|---|---|---|---|
| 1 | Zhang Jiaxuan; Huang Yihang | China | 62.94 | 2024-25 Junior Grand Prix Final |
| 2 | Jazmine Desrochers; Kieran Thrasher | Canada | 59.41 | 2024 JGP Turkey |
| 3 | Olivia Flores; Luke Wang | United States | 54.93 | 2024 JGP Turkey |
| 4 | Zhang Xuanqi; Feng Wenqiang | China | 54.14 | 2024 JGP Czech Republic |
| 5 | Sofiia Holichenko; Artem Darenskyi | Ukraine | 51.81 | 2024 JGP Poland |
| 6 | Romane Telemaque; Lucas Coulon | France | 51.34 | 2024-25 Junior Grand Prix Final |
| 7 | Sae Shimizu; Lucas Tsuyoshi Honda | Japan | 50.20 | 2024-25 Junior Grand Prix Final |
| 8 | Louise Ehrhard; Mathis Pellegris | France | 50.42 | 2024 JGP Turkey |
| 9 | Saya Carpenter; Ignacio Maravilla | United States | 50.07 | 2024 JGP Poland |
| 10 | Polina Polman; Gabriel Renoldi | Italy | 49.28 | 2024 JGP Czech Republic |

Top 10 best scores in the pairs' free skating
| No. | Team | Nation | Score | Event |
|---|---|---|---|---|
| 1 | Zhang Jiaxuan; Huang Yihang | China | 105.55 | 2024 JGP Latvia |
| 2 | Jazmine Desrochers; Kieran Thrasher | Canada | 100.36 | 2024 JGP Turkey |
| 3 | Olivia Flores; Luke Wang | United States | 92.87 | 2024 JGP Turkey |
| 4 | Sae Shimizu; Lucas Tsuyoshi Honda | Japan | 92.15 | 2024 JGP Turkey |
| 5 | Julia Quattrocchi; Simon Desmaris | Canada | 91.94 | 2024 JGP Czech Republic |
| 6 | Zhang Xuanqi; Feng Wenqiang | China | 91.41 | 2024 JGP Czech Republic |
| 7 | Irina Napolitano; Edoardo Comi | Italy | 91.26 | 2024 JGP Poland |
| 8 | Romane Telemaque; Lucas Coulon | France | 90.01 | 2024 JGP Czech Republic |
| 9 | Elizabeth Hansen; William Church | United States | 85.79 | 2024 JGP Poland |
| 10 | Sofiia Holichenko; Artem Darenskyi | Ukraine | 84.77 | 2024 JGP Poland |

=== Ice dance ===
Top 10 season's best scores in the combined total (ice dance)
| No. | Team | Nation | Score | Event |
|---|---|---|---|---|
| 1 | Noemi Maria Tali; Noah Lafornara | Italy | 169.47 | 2024 JGP Thailand |
| 2 | Iryna Pidgaina; Artem Koval | Ukraine | 168.30 | 2024 JGP Slovenia |
| 3 | Katarina Wolfkostin; Dimitry Tsarevski | United States | 166.88 | 2024 JGP Poland |
| 4 | Célina Fradji; Jean-Hans Fourneaux | France | 162.86 | 2024 JGP Slovenia |
| 5 | Caroline Mullen; Brendan Mullen | United States | 161.16 | 2024 JGP Slovenia |
| 6 | Sandrine Gauthier; Quentin Thieren | Canada | 160.75 | 2024 JGP Poland |
| 7 | Elliana Peal; Ethan Peal | United States | 160.50 | 2024 JGP China |
| 8 | Hana Maria Aboian; Daniil Veselukhin | United States | 160.12 | 2024 JGP Thailand |
| 9 | Darya Grimm; Michail Savitskiy | Germany | 158.20 | 2024 JGP Turkey |
| 10 | Ambre Perrier Gianesini; Samuel Blanc Klaperman | France | 154.87 | 2024 JGP China |

Top 10 season's best scores in the rhythm dance
| No. | Team | Nation | Score | Event |
|---|---|---|---|---|
| 1 | Noemi Maria Tali; Noah Lafornara | Italy | 68.80 | 2024 JGP Thailand |
| 2 | Iryna Pidgaina; Artem Koval | Ukraine | 67.83 | 2024 JGP Slovenia |
| 3 | Célina Fradji; Jean-Hans Fourneaux | France | 66.94 | 2024 JGP Slovenia |
| 4 | Katarina Wolfkostin; Dimitry Tsarevski | United States | 65.85 | 2024 JGP Poland |
| 5 | Elliana Peal; Ethan Peal | United States | 65.31 | 2024 JGP China |
| 6 | Darya Grimm; Michail Savitskiy | Germany | 64.84 | 2024-25 Junior Grand Prix Final |
| 7 | Hana Maria Aboian; Daniil Veselukhin | United States | 64.31 | 2024 JGP Thailand |
| 8 | Sandrine Gauthier; Quentin Thieren | Canada | 63.96 | 2024 JGP Poland |
| 9 | Caroline Mullen; Brendan Mullen | United States | 63.73 | 2024 JGP Slovenia |
| 10 | Laura Finelli; Massimiliano Bucciarelli | Italy | 63.67 | 2024 JGP Poland |

Top 10 season's best scores in the free dance
| No. | Team | Nation | Score | Event |
|---|---|---|---|---|
| 1 | Katarina Wolfkostin; Dimitry Tsarevski | United States | 101.03 | 2024 JGP Poland |
| 2 | Noemi Maria Tali; Noah Lafornara | Italy | 100.67 | 2024 JGP Thailand |
| 3 | Iryna Pidgaina; Artem Koval | Ukraine | 100.47 | 2024 JGP Slovenia |
| 4 | Caroline Mullen; Brendan Mullen | United States | 97.43 | 2024 JGP Slovenia |
| 5 | Darya Grimm; Michail Savitskiy | Germany | 97.31 | 2024 JGP Turkey |
| 6 | Sandrine Gauthier; Quentin Thieren | Canada | 96.79 | 2024 JGP Poland |
| 7 | Ambre Perrier Gianesini; Samuel Blanc Klaperman | France | 96.13 | 2024 JGP China |
| 8 | Célina Fradji; Jean-Hans Fourneaux | France | 95.92 | 2024 JGP Slovenia |
| 9 | Hana Maria Aboian; Daniil Veselukhin | United States | 95.81 | 2024 JGP Thailand |
| 10 | Elliana Peal; Ethan Peal | United States | 95.19 | 2024 JGP China |
