= Kim Yu-seong =

South Korean figure skater (born 2009)

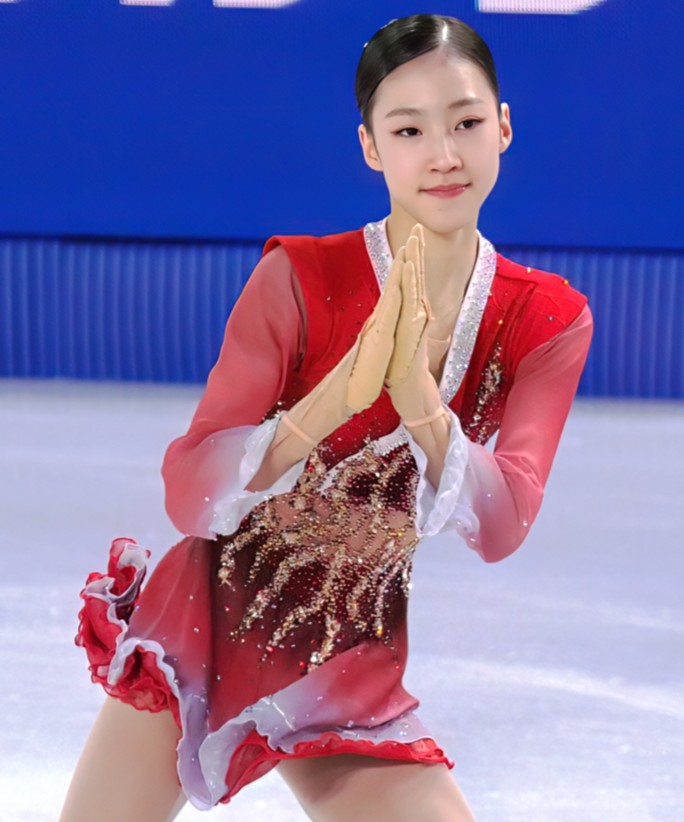
- Kim during her free skate at the 2024–25 Junior Grand Prix Final

Personal information
- Native name: 김유성
- Other names: Yuseong Kim
- Born: 12 June 2009 (age 17) Seoul, South Korea
- Home town: Anyang
- Height: 1.60 m (5 ft 3 in)

Figure skating career
- Country: South Korea
- Coach: Choi Hyung-kyung; Kim Na-hyun
- Skating club: C&K Team
- Began skating: 2019

Medal record
South Korean Championships
Silver medal – second place	2026 Seoul	Singles
Junior Grand Prix Final
Silver medal – second place	2025–26 Nagoya	Singles

Kim Yu-seong (Korean: 김유성; born 12 June 2009) is a South Korean figure skater. She is the 2026 Nepela Memorial champion, the 2026 Cranberry Cup champion, and the 2026 South Korean national silver medalist.

On the junior level, she is the ISU Junior Grand Prix Final 2025–26 silver medalist, a five-time ISU Junior Grand Prix medalist, having won two gold medals and three silver medals, and the 2023 South Korean junior national champion.

== Personal life ==
Kim was born on June 12, 2009, in Seoul. Her fraternal twin sister, Yu-jae, who is six minutes older than her, is also a competitive figure skater.

== Career ==
=== Early years ===
Kim's mother, Ga-young, first enrolled her and her sister Yu-jae in figure skating classes during their second year of elementary school to improve their health. In 2019, both sisters moved to train in Gwacheon under the tutelage of Choi Hyung-kyung.

=== 2022–23 season ===
Kim made her international junior debut at the 2022 Denis Ten Memorial Challenge, where she won the silver medal. She later won the 2023 South Korean Junior Championships.

=== 2023–24 season ===
Kim began the season by entering the 2023 South Korean Junior Grand Prix Qualifiers in July, where she placed fourth overall. She was then awarded two assignments at the ISU Junior Grand Prix, where she won silver medals at the 2023 JGP Hungary and the 2023 JGP Thailand, qualifying her for the Junior Grand Prix Final. At the former JGP event, Kim was noted to have landed a triple Axel during her free skate program, making her the third South Korean woman in history to have successfully landed the jump in international competition, following You Young and Kim Yu-jae, Kim's twin sister.

In late September, it was announced that Kim and her sister made a coaching change from Choi Hyung-kyung to Chi Hyun-jung and Kim Jin-seo.

During the domestic qualifiers for the 2024 Winter Youth Olympics in October, Kim finished at second place behind Shin Ji-a; as a result, both Shin and Kim were selected to represent South Korea at the competition the following year. In December, Kim competed at the 2023–24 Junior Grand Prix Final in Beijing, where she placed fifth in the short program, fourth in the free skate, and fourth overall.

Competing at the senior level, Kim entered the 2024 South Korean Championships, where she ranked fourth overall. At the 2024 Winter Youth Olympics in Gangwon, Kim placed fourth in the short program, free skate, and overall total, resulting in an off-podium finish behind Mao Shimada, Yo Takagi, and Shin. Together with her sister Yu-jae and Shin, Kim was selected to compete at the 2024 World Junior Championships in Taipei, where she placed 15th overall.

=== 2024–25 season ===
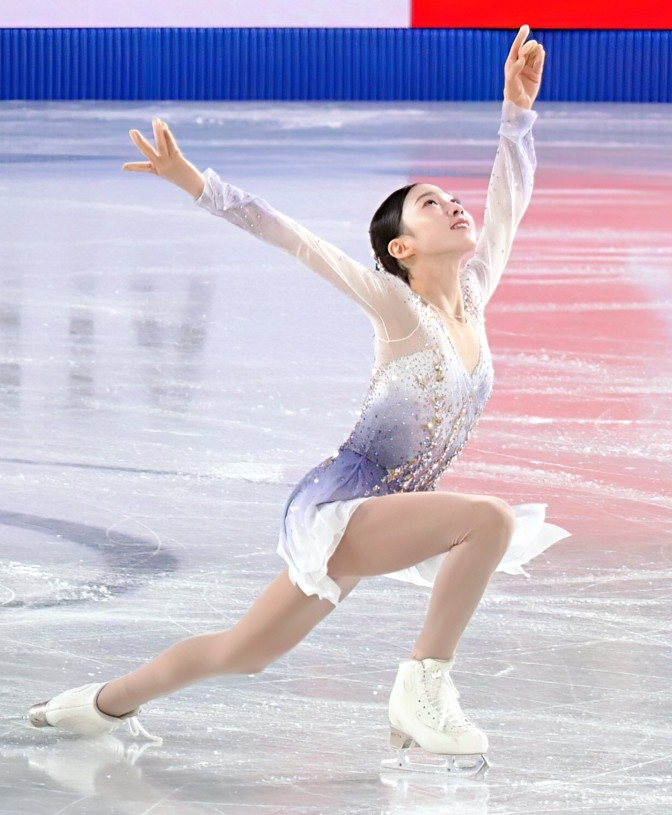
Kim performing her short program at the 2024–25 Junior Grand Prix Final

Upon securing the silver medal at the 2024 South Korean Junior Grand Prix Qualifiers, Kim was once again assigned to two events at the ISU Junior Grand Prix series. At the 2024 JGP Turkey, she won her first international title after scoring personal best scores in both the short program and the free skate. Kim then won a silver medal at the 2024 JGP China. The two results qualified her for the 2024–25 Junior Grand Prix Final in Grenoble, where she ranked at fifth place in the short program, free skate, and overall total.

Entering the 2025 South Korean Championships at the senior level, Kim repeated her fourth-place finish. In February, she was invited to skate in the exhibition gala at the 2025 Four Continents Championships, which took place in Seoul. She later concluded the season by competing at the junior women's category of the 2025 Thailand Open Trophy in Bangkok, where she won the gold medal.

=== 2025–26 season: Junior Grand Prix Final silver ===
Kim secured her two Junior Grand Prix assignments with a silver medal at the domestic JGP qualifying competition. Kim then competed at the 2025 JGP Latvia, where she placed fifth, and the 2025 JGP Azerbaijan, where she earned her second JGP gold medal. Both results allowed Kim to qualify for the 2025–26 Junior Grand Prix Final for a third consecutive time. Her sister, Yu-jae, also qualified for the event. During the competition, Kim placed fifth in the short program and third in the free skate, scoring personal bests in both the free skate and total scores. She ultimately earned a silver medal finish behind Mao Shimada.

In January, Kim competed at the 2026 South Korean Championships, winning the silver medal. In March, she concluded her season by competing at the 2026 World Junior Championships, where she placed thirteenth in both the short and free programs to finish in thirteenth place overall.

=== 2026–27 season ===
Kim opened the season by winning the 2026 CS Cranberry Cup International in her senior international debut. She additionally won the 2026 Nepela Memorial, setting a new personal best free skate score with a 141.43.

Kim made her senior Grand Prix debut at the 2026 Grand Prix de France placing fifth overall. The following month, she placed fourth at 2026 Finlandia Trophy. She landed a triple Axel in both the short program and free skate, although the short-program attempt was slightly underrotated. "My triple Axel has been quite consistent in practice, including during program run-throughs, so I think that helped me land it successfully in competition as well," she said after the free skate.

== Programs ==
Season	Short program	Free skating	Exhibition
2026–2027	Fosse; I Gotcha performed by Shannon Lewis; Life Is Just a Bowl of Cherries performed by Valarie Pettiford; Fosse’s World: Calypso / Snake in the Grass performed by Fosse Ensemble choreo. by Kaitlyn Weaver	Evita; You Must Love Me; Buenos Aires; Don't Cry for Me Argentina by Andrew Lloyd Webber performed by Madonna choreo. by Shin Yea-ji	Don't I Make It Look Easy; Me Too by Meghan Trainor
2025–2026	Clair de lune by Claude Debussy performed by London Philharmonic Orchestra choreo. by Misha Ge; "Eye of the Untold Her" by Lindsey Stirling choreo. by Misha Ge	Titanic; Distant Memories; A Building Panic by James Horner; My Heart Will Go On performed by Celine Dion choreo. by Shin Yea-ji	
2024–2025	Clair de lune by Claude Debussy performed by London Philharmonic Orchestra choreo. by Misha Ge	"Swift Sword" (from Hero) by Tan Dun; "A Love Before Time" (from Crouching Tiger, Hidden Dragon ) by Tan Dun choreo. by Shin Yea-ji	"Don't I Make It Look Easy"; "Me Too" by Meghan Trainor
2023–2024	"Fly Me to the Moon (Inspired by Final Fantasy XIV)" by Bart Howard performed by Sia choreo. by Shin Yea-ji	The Lark Ascending by Simon Franglen choreo. by Shin Yea-ji	
2022–2023	"Fly Me to the Moon (Inspired by Final Fantasy XIV)" by Bart Howard performed by Sia choreo. by Shin Yea-ji	The Lark Ascending by Simon Franglen choreo. by Shin Yea-ji	

== Competitive highlights ==
- GP – Event of the ISU Grand Prix Series
- JGP – Event of the ISU Junior Grand Prix Series
- CS – Event of the ISU Challenger Series
- TBD – Assigned
- WD – Withdrew from competition

Competition placements at senior level
Season	2023–24	2024–25	2025–26	2026–27
South Korean Championships	4th	4th	2nd	
GP Finland				4th
GP France				5th
CS Cranberry Cup				1st
CS Nepela Memorial				1st

Competition placements at junior level
Season	2022–23	2023–24	2024–25	2025–26
Winter Youth Olympics		4th		
World Junior Championships		15th		13th
Junior Grand Prix Final		4th	5th	2nd
South Korean Championships	1st			
JGP Azerbaijan				1st
JGP China			2nd	
JGP Hungary		2nd		
JGP Latvia				5th
JGP Thailand		2nd		
JGP Turkey			1st	
Denis Ten Memorial	2nd			
Thailand Open Trophy			1st	

== Detailed results ==
ISU personal best scores in the +5/-5 GOE System
Segment	Type	Score	Event
Total	**TSS**	**204.86**	2026 Finlandia Trophy
Short program	**TSS**	**68.72**	2026 Grand Prix de France
Short program	TES	39.55	2026 Grand Prix de France
Short program	PCS	30.17	2026 Grand Prix de France
Free skating	**TSS**	**141.43**	2026 CS Nepela Memorial
Free skating	TES	76.17	2026 CS Nepela Memorial
Free skating	PCS	65.26	2026 CS Nepela Memorial

=== Senior level ===
- Small medals for the short program and free skating are only awarded at ISU Championships.
- Medals at team events are awarded for the team results only. Individual placements at team events are listed in parentheses.
- ISU Personal Bests highlighted in **bold**.

Results in the 2026–27 season
Date	Event	SP		FS		Total	
Date	Event	P	Score	P	Score	P	Score
Aug 6–9, 2026	(United States) 2026 CS Cranberry Cup International	1	67.77	1	134.93	1	202.70
Sep 24–27, 2026	(Slovakia) 2026 CS Nepela Memorial	4	61.27	1	**141.43**	1	202.70
Oct 23–25, 2026	2026 Grand Prix de France	4	**68.72**	7	123.85	5	192.57
Nov 20–22, 2026	(Finland) 2026 Finlandia Trophy	4	68.38	4	136.48	4	**204.86**

=== Junior level ===
Results in the 2022–23 season
Date	Event	SP		FS		Total	
Date	Event	P	Score	P	Score	P	Score
Oct 26 – 29, 2022	(Kazakhstan) 2022 Denis Ten Memorial	2	58.26	2	95.64	2	153.90
Jan 5 – 8, 2023	(South Korea) 2023 South Korean Championships (Junior)	1	59.35	1	117.72	1	177.07

Results in the 2023–24 season
Date	Event	SP		FS		Total	
Date	Event	P	Score	P	Score	P	Score
Aug 23 – 26, 2023	2023 JGP Thailand	2	63.04	1	126.88	2	189.92
Aug 30 – Sep 2, 2023	2023 JGP Hungary	6	60.03	3	116.95	2	176.98
Dec 7 – 10, 2023	(China) 2023-24 Junior Grand Prix Final	5	62.71	4	127.77	4	190.48
Jan 4 – 7, 2024	(South Korea) 2024 South Korean Championships (Senior)	7	64.93	4	135.80	4	200.73
Jan 28 – 30, 2024	(South Korea) 2024 Winter Youth Olympics	4	63.64	4	117.89	4	181.53
Feb 26 – Mar 3, 2024	(Taiwan) 2024 World Junior Championships	9	59.58	15	111.22	15	170.80

Results in the 2024–25 season
Date	Event	SP		FS		Total	
Date	Event	P	Score	P	Score	P	Score
Sep 18 – 21, 2024	2024 JGP Turkey	2	64.72	1	133.91	1	198.63
Oct 9 – 12, 2024	2024 JGP China	1	64.20	2	128.03	2	192.23
Dec 5 – 8, 2024	(France) 2024-25 Junior Grand Prix Final	5	64.42	5	119.81	5	184.23
Jan 2 – 5, 2025	(South Korea) 2025 South Korean Championships (Senior)	5	63.08	3	129.44	4	192.52
May 2 – 6, 2025	2025 Thailand Open	1	59.07	1	118.33	1	177.40

Results in the 2025–26 season
Date	Event	SP		FS		Total	
Date	Event	P	Score	P	Score	P	Score
Aug 20 – 23, 2025	2025 JGP Latvia	8	54.70	3	116.69	5	171.39
Sep 23 – 26, 2025	2025 JGP Azerbaijan	1	59.68	2	126.31	1	185.90
Dec 4 – 7, 2025	(Japan) 2025-26 Junior Grand Prix Final	5	64.06	3	134.60	2	198.66
Jan 3 – 6, 2026	(South Korea) 2026 South Korean Championships (Senior)	2	68.25	2	144.58	2	212.83
Mar 3 – 8, 2026	(Estonia) 2026 World Junior Championships	13	59.44	13	116.46	13	175.90
