= Yun Ah-sun =

South Korean figure skater (born 2007)

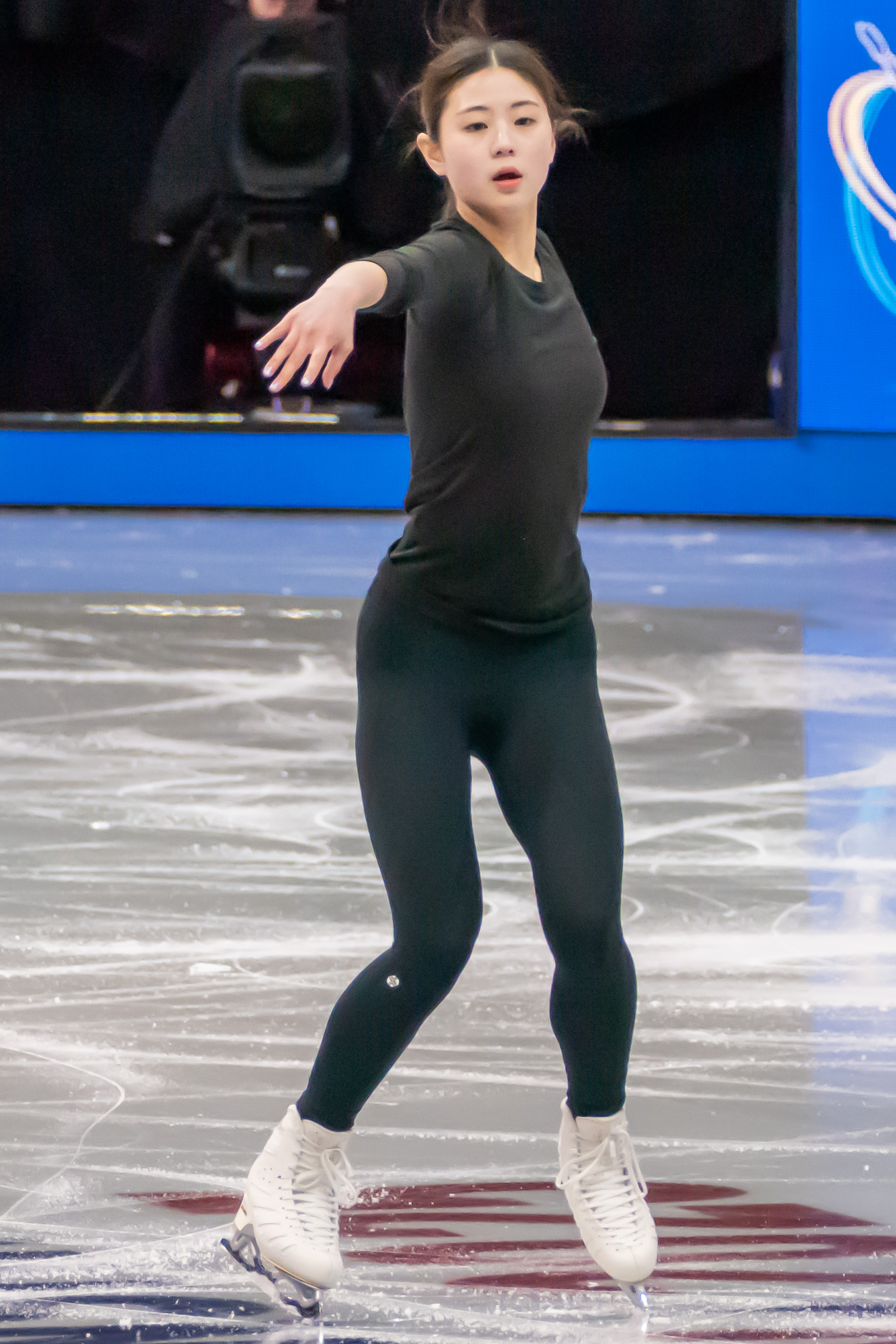
- Yun at the 2025 World Championships

Personal information
- Native name: 윤아선
- Other names: Ahsun Yun
- Born: February 18, 2007 (age 19) Ansan, South Korea
- Home town: Namyangju
- Height: 1.63 m (5 ft 4 in)

Figure skating career
- Country: South Korea
- Coach: Chi Hyun-jung; Kim Jin-seo
- Began skating: 2015

Yun Ah-sun (Korean: 윤아선; born February 18, 2007) is a South Korean figure skater. She is the 2021 South Korean national silver medalist and a two-time Challenger Series medalist (one gold, one silver)

She also finished fourth at the 2022 World Junior Championships, winning a small bronze medal for her short program.

== Personal life ==
Yun was born on February 18, 2007. She has a younger sister, and a dog named Hodu.

== Career ==
=== Early career ===
Yun began learning to skate in 2015 at the age of seven.

She placed eighth at the senior level at the 2020 South Korean Championships and won the silver medal the following year. Due to the COVID-19 pandemic, the 2020–21 international junior season was not held, and Yun was therefore unable to compete on the Junior Grand Prix or at the World Junior Championships.

=== 2021–22 season: Junior international debut ===
With the resumption of international junior competition, Yun was scheduled to make her international debut on the Junior Grand Prix, competing back-to-back weeks in events both held in Courchevel. She placed fifth in both contests. Yun was sixth at the 2022 South Korean Championships.

Due to her national result, Yun was named to South Korea's team for the 2022 World Junior Championships, but events would soon complicate the situation. Shortly after the conclusion of the 2022 Winter Olympics, Russia invaded Ukraine. As a result, the International Skating Union banned all Russian athletes from competing at ISU championships. As Russian women had dominated international figure skating in recent years, this had a significant impact on the field. Due to both the invasion and the Omicron variant, the World Junior Championships could not be held as scheduled in Sofia in early March and were rescheduled for mid-April in Tallinn. During the official practice of these championships, Yun slightly dislocated her shoulder prior to the short program. Regardless, she would place third in the short program, 0.14 points ahead of American Lindsay Thorngren, winning a bronze small medal. She expressed disappointment at having lost levels on two spins but said she was happy with the performance. She was overtaken by Thorngren in the free skate, finishing in fourth place overall.

=== 2022–23 season: Senior international debut ===
Yun planned to compete at the 2022 CS Nebelhorn Trophy, placing sixth in the short program, but withdrew before the free skate due to suffering from symptoms of a concussion.

Making her senior Grand Prix debut at the 2022 Skate America, she came in ninth. Competing at the 2022 CS Ice Challenge, Yun won the short program but ninth in the free skate, dropping to sixth overall. She closed her season with an eighth-place finish at the 2023 South Korean Figure Skating Championships.

Yun struggled with a torn hip joint throughout the season.

=== 2023–24 season ===
Prior to the season, Yun made a coaching change from to Chi Hyun-jung and Kim Jin-seo. She made her season debut at the 2023 CS Lombardia Trophy and finished in twelfth place. Yun then went on to compete at the 2023 CS Denis Ten Memorial Challenge, where she placed tenth.

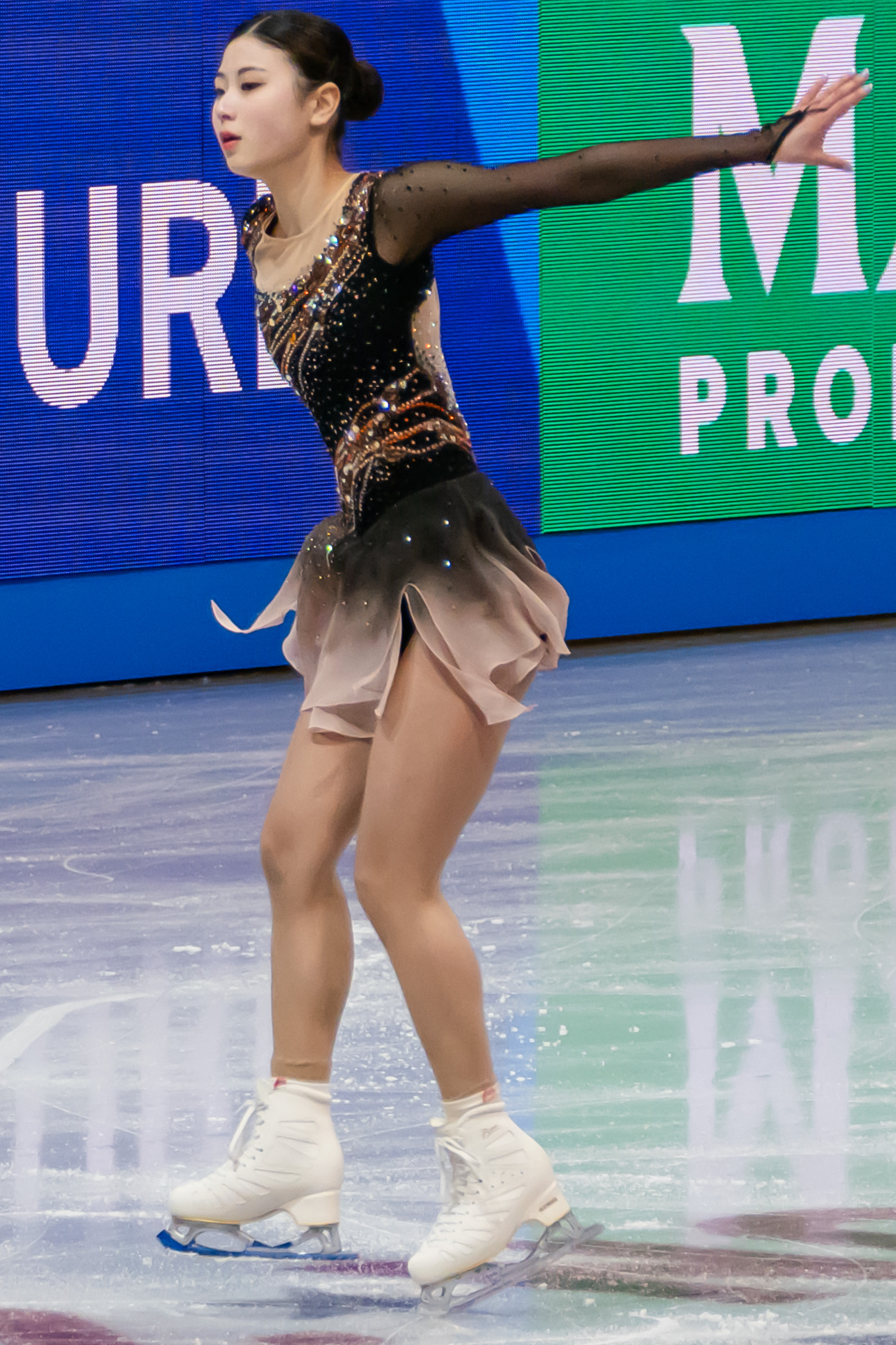
Yun performing her short program at the 2025 World Championships

Following a twenty-third place finish at the South Korean Ranking Competition, she would not compete at the 2024 South Korean Championships.

=== 2024–25 season: World Championship debut ===
Yun started the season by competing on the 2024–25 ISU Challenger Series, finishing fourth at the 2024 CS Cranberry Cup International and winning gold at the 2024 CS Nepela Memorial. Although not initially assigned to compete on the 2024–25 Grand Prix circuit, she was assigned to compete at the 2024 Finlandia Trophy in early November following the withdrawal of Isabeau Levito. She would finish the event in fifth place. “I did a mistake at the end of my performance today, so I am not completely satisfied,” said Yun. “But I reached my goal to skate and place in the last group. I think this was a good experience on the Grand Prix for me.”

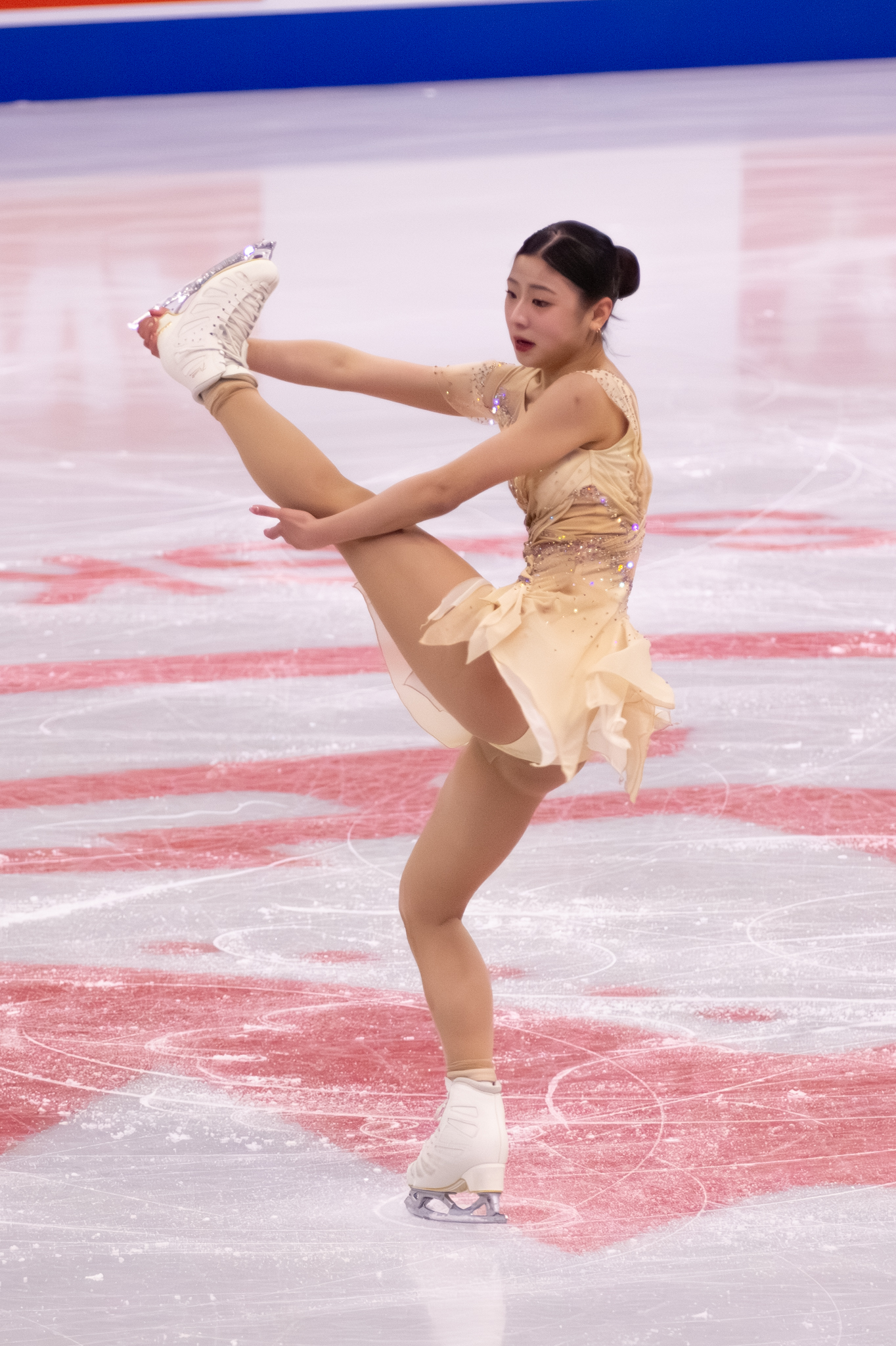
Yun performing a spin at 2025 Skate Canada International

In late November, Yun would compete at the annual South Korean Ranking Competition, where she finished fourth. With this result, Yun was selected to compete at the 2025 Four Continents Championships. One month later, Yun placed fifth at the 2025 South Korean Championships. As the second-highest ranked senior-eligible women's skater at the event, she was named to the 2025 World team.

Going on to compete at the 2025 Four Continents Championships in Seoul, Yun finished in ninth place. Prior to the World Championships, Yun changed her free skate from Scheherazade back to a past program from the 2021-22 season, which contains music from The Mummy Returns. At the World Championships, she placed thirty-first in the short program and did not advance to the free skate.

=== 2025–2026 season ===
Yun began the season by competing on the 2025–26 Challenger Series, placing ninth at the 2025 CS Kinoshita Group Cup, winning the silver medal at the 2025 CS Denis Ten Memorial Challenge, and finishing sixth at the 2025 CS Trialeti Trophy. She then went on to compete on the 2025–26 Grand Prix circuit, placing tenth at 2025 Skate Canada International and seventh at the 2025 NHK Trophy.

In January, Yun finished eleventh at the 2026 South Korean Championships. Following the withdrawal of Kim Chae-yeon, Yun was named to the 2026 Four Continents team where she finished in 14th place.

=== 2026–2027 season ===
Yun opened her season with a fourth place finish at the 2026 CS Lombardia Trophy.

In November, Yun competed at the 2026 Skate America where she finished in eighth place overall.

== Programs ==
Season	Short program	Free skating	Exhibition
2026–27	Spartacus by Aram Khachaturian	On the Nature of Daylight by Max Richter	Training Season by Dua Lipa choreo by. Cha Jun-hwan
2025–26	East of Eden by Lee Holdridge choreo. by Shin Yea-ji; The Fire Within by Jennifer Thomas choreo. by Misha Ge	Les Misérables by Claude-Michel Schönberg; I Dreamed a Dream performed by Anne Hathaway; On My Own performed by Samantha Barks; One Day More (Instrumental) by Claude-Michel Schönberg choreo. by Leonid Sviridenko	As the World Caves In by Matt Maltese performed by Sarah Cothran
2024–25	Oppenheimer; Can You Hear the Music; Quantum Mechanics; American Prometheus by Ludwig Göransson choreo. by Shin Yea-ji; La La Land; Mia and Sebastian's Theme; Epilogue; The End by Justin Hurwitz choreo. by Jeffrey Buttle	The Mummy Returns by Alan Silvestri & Sinfonia of London choreo. by Shin Yea-ji; Scheherazade by Nikolai Rimsky-Korsakov choreo. by Shin Yea-ji	As the World Caves In by Matt Maltese performed by Sarah Cothran
2023–24	La La Land; Mia and Sebastian's Theme; Epilogue; The End by Justin Hurwitz choreo. by Jeffrey Buttle	The Queen's Gambit; Beth's Story; Jolene!; Beth Alone; Main Title by Carlos Rafael Rivera choreo. by Misha Ge	
2022–23	Circles (Experience) by Ludovico Einaudi performed by Greta Svabo Bech choreo. by Shin Yea-ji	Introduction and Rondo Capriccioso by Camille Saint-Saëns choreo. by Shin Yea-ji	Smells Like Teen Spirit by Nirvana performed by Queenz of Piano choreo by. Shin Yea-ji
2021–22	La Strada by Nino Rota choreo by. Shin Yea-ji; Smells Like Teen Spirit by Nirvana performed by Queenz of Piano choreo by. Shin Yea-ji	The Mummy Returns by Alan Silvestri & Sinfonia of London choreo. by Shin Yea-ji; Across the Stars (from Star Wars: Episode II – Attack of the Clones) by John Williams choreo. by Shin Yea-ji	
2020–21	La Strada by Nino Rota choreo by. Shin Yea-ji	Across the Stars (from Star Wars: Episode II – Attack of the Clones) by John Williams choreo. by Shin Yea-ji	

== Competitive highlights ==
- GP – Event of the ISU Grand Prix Series
- JGP – Event of the ISU Junior Grand Prix Series
- CS – Event of the ISU Challenger Series
- TBD – Assigned
- WD – Withdrew from competition

Competition placements at senior level
Season	2019–20	2020–21	2021–22	2022–23	2023–24	2024–25	2025–26	2026–27
World Championships						31st		
Four Continents Championships						9th	14th	
South Korean Championships	8th	2nd	6th	8th	WD	5th		
GP Finland						5th		
GP NHK Trophy							7th	
GP Skate America				9th				8th
GP Skate Canada							10th	
CS Cranberry Cup						4th		
CS Denis Ten Memorial					10th		2nd	
CS Ice Challenge				6th				
CS Kinoshita Group Cup							9th	
CS Lombardia Trophy					12th			4th
CS Nebelhorn Trophy				WD				
CS Nepela Memorial						1st		
CS Trialeti Trophy							5th	

Competition placements at junior level
Season	2021–22
World Junior Championships	4th
JGP France I	5th
JGP France II	5th

== Detailed results ==
ISU personal best scores in the +5/-5 GOE System
Segment	Type	Score	Event
Total	**TSS**	**195.87**	2022 World Junior Championships
Short program	**TSS**	**67.13**	2026 Skate America
Short program	TES	38.13	2022 World Junior Championships
Short program	PCS	28.83	2025 Four Continents Championships
Free skating	**TSS**	**129.59**	2022 World Junior Championships
Free skating	TES	71.18	2022 World Junior Championships
Free skating	PCS	58.84	2025 Four Continents Championships

=== Senior results ===
Results in the 2019–20 season
Date	Event	SP		FS		Total	
Date	Event	P	Score	P	Score	P	Score
Jan 3–5, 2020	(South Korea) 2020 South Korean Championships	10	58.88	8	117.17	8	176.05

Results in the 2020–21 season
Date	Event	SP		FS		Total	
Date	Event	P	Score	P	Score	P	Score
Feb 24–26, 2021	(South Korea) 2021 South Korean Championships	5	66.29	1	131.70	2	197.99

Results in the 2021–22 season
Date	Event	SP		FS		Total	
Date	Event	P	Score	P	Score	P	Score
Jan 7–9, 2022	(South Korea) 2022 South Korean Championships	9	64.81	5	132.28	6	197.09

Results in the 2022–23 season
Date	Event	SP		FS		Total	
Date	Event	P	Score	P	Score	P	Score
Sep 21–24, 2022	(Germany) 2022 CS Nebelhorn Trophy	6	56.94	-	-	WD	-
Oct 21–23, 2022	(United States) 2022 Skate America	11	47.98	7	108.72	9	156.70
Nov 9–13, 2022	(Austria) 2022 CS Ice Challenge	1	61.83	9	101.99	6	163.82
Jan 5–8, 2023	(South Korea) 2023 South Korean Championships	5	66.49	8	124.20	8	190.69

Results in the 2023–24 season
Date	Event	SP		FS		Total	
Date	Event	P	Score	P	Score	P	Score
Sep 8–10, 2023	(Italy) 2023 CS Lombardia Trophy	14	45.46	12	86.58	12	132.04
Nov 1–4, 2023	(Kazakhstan) 2023 CS Denis Ten Memorial Challenge	12	45.91	10	84.78	10	130.69

Results in the 2024–25 season
Date	Event	SP		FS		Total	
Date	Event	P	Score	P	Score	P	Score
Aug 8–11, 2024	(United States) 2024 CS Cranberry Cup International	4	60.46	4	125.11	4	185.57
Oct 24-26, 2024	(Slovakia) 2024 CS Nepela Memorial	1	61.69	1	122.55	1	184.24
Nov 15-17, 2024	(Finland) 2024 Finlandia Trophy	5	63.16	6	124.52	5	187.68
Jan 2–5, 2025	(South Korea) 2025 South Korean Championships	6	61.90	4	126.25	5	188.15
Feb 19–23, 2025	(South Korea) 2025 Four Continents Championships	6	65.57	10	117.11	9	182.68
Mar 25–30, 2025	(United States) 2025 World Championships	31	41.08	-	-	31	41.08

Results in the 2025–26 season
Date	Event	SP		FS		Total	
Date	Event	P	Score	P	Score	P	Score
Sep 5–7, 2025	(Japan) 2025 CS Kinoshita Group Cup	9	57.35	9	116.16	9	173.51
Oct 1–4, 2025	(Kazakhstan) 2025 CS Denis Ten Memorial Challenge	4	53.43	2	120.94	2	174.37
Oct 8–11, 2025	(Georgia (country)) 2025 CS Trialeti Trophy	6	60.10	4	117.24	5	177.34
Oct 31 – Nov 2, 2025	2025 Skate Canada International	9	58.84	11	107.73	10	166.57
Nov 7–9, 2025	(Japan) 2025 NHK Trophy	5	61.51	7	118.72	7	180.23
Jan 3–6, 2026	(South Korea) 2026 South Korean Championships	11	58.42	8	120.39	11	178.81
Jan 21-25, 2026	(China) 2026 Four Continents Championships	15	51.71	14	109.03	14	160.74

Results in the 2026–27 season
Date	Event	SP		FS		Total	
Date	Event	P	Score	P	Score	P	Score
September 17–20, 2026	(Italy) 2026 CS Lombardia Trophy	5	60.60	5	127.91	4	188.51
November 13–15, 2026	(United States) 2026 Skate America	7	**67.13**	9	122.09	8	189.22

=== Junior results ===
Current personal best scores are highlighted in bold.

2021–22 season
Date	Event	SP	FS	Total
April 13–17, 2022	2022 World Junior Championships	3; 66.28	4; **129.59**	4; **195.87**
August 25–28, 2021	2021 JGP France II	6; 57.73	5; 112.51	5; 170.24
August 18–21, 2021	2021 JGP France I	10; 48.18	5; 109.06	5; 157.24
