= 2024 South Korean Figure Skating Championships =

Figure skating competition

- Type: National championship
- Date: January 4 – 7
- Season: 2023–24
- Location: Uijeongbu, South Korea
- Host: Korean Skating Union
- Venue: Uijeongbu Indoor Ice Rink

Champions
- Men's singles: Cha Jun-hwan (S); Yu Dong-han (J)
- Women's singles: Shin Ji-a (S); Jang Ha-rin (J)
- Ice dance: Hannah Lim / Ye Quan (S); Kim Jin-ny / Lee Na-mu (J)
- Previous: 2023 South Korean Championships
- Next: 2025 South Korean Championships

The 2024 South Korean Figure Skating Championships were held from January 4–7, 2024 at the Uijeongbu Indoor Ice Rink in Uijeongbu. It was the 78th edition of the event. Medals were awarded in the disciplines of men's singles, women's singles, and ice dance on the senior and junior levels. The results were part of the Korean Skating Union's selection criteria for the 2024 World Junior Championships and the 2024 World Championships.

== Schedule ==
Date	Start	Finish	Discipline	Event
Thursday, January 4	13:40	14:26	Junior men	Short program
Thursday, January 4	14:41	19:31	Junior women	Short program
Friday, January 5	11:35	12:29	Junior men	Free skating
Friday, January 5	12:44	15:45	Junior women	Free skating
Saturday, January 6	12:34	12:53	Senior/Junior ice dance	Rhythm dance
Saturday, January 6	13:07	14:09	Senior men	Short program
Saturday, January 6	14:24	17:00	Senior women	Short program
Sunday, January 7	11:40	12:01	Senior/Junior ice dance	Free dance
Sunday, January 7	12:15	13:30	Senior men	Free skating
Sunday, January 7	13:45	16:50	Senior women	Free skating
All times are listed in Korea Standard Time (UTC+09:00).

== Medal summary ==
=== Senior ===
Discipline	Gold	Silver	Bronze
Men	Cha Jun-hwan	Lee Si-hyeong	Seo Min-kyu
Women	Shin Ji-a	Lee Hae-in	Kim Chae-yeon
Ice dance	Hannah Lim / Ye Quan	No other competitors	

=== Junior ===
Discipline	Gold	Silver	Bronze
Men	Yu Dong-han	Chung Jae-wook	Kim Tae-hwan
Women	Jang Ha-rin	Lee Ji-yoon	Kim Ji-yu
Ice dance	Kim Jin-ny / Lee Na-mu	No other competitors	

== Entries ==
A list of preliminary entries was published on December 26, 2023.

=== Senior ===
Men	Women	Ice dance
Cha Jun-hwan	Choi Da-bin	Hannah Lim / Ye Quan
Cha Young-hyun	Han Hee-sue	
Choi Ha-bin	Hong Seung-a	
Kim Han-gil	Hwang Jeong-yul	
Kim Hyun-gyeom	Jin Jue-un	
Lee Jae-keun	Kim Chae-yeon	
Lee Si-hyeong	Kim Seo-young	
Lim Ju-heon	Kim Yu-jae	
Park Hyun-seo	Kim Yu-seong	
Seo Min-kyu	Ko Na-yeon	
	Kwon Min-sol	
Lee Eun
Lee Hae-in
Lee Hyo-rin
Park Eun-bi
Shin Ji-a
Son Da-on
Song Si-woo
Wi Seo-yeong
Yook Jeong-min
You Young
Youn Seo-jin
Yun Ah-sun

=== Junior ===
Men	Women	Ice dance
Choi Ye-chang	Cha Doi	Kim Jin-ny / Lee Na-mu
Choi Ye-hwang	Cho Ha-yul	
Chung Jae-wook	Cho Yun-ha	
Kim Aaron	Choi Soi	
Kim Tae-hwan	Hwang Ji-young	
Kim Ye-sung	Jang Ha-rin	
Yu Dong-han	Jeon Chae-eun	
	Jeon Hyo-jin	
Jeong Ha-min
Jo Ha-yeon
Joo Hye-won
Jung Sube-en
Kim Bo-hwa
Kim Chan
Kim Ga-heun
Kim Ga-hyeon
Kim Gun-hee
Kim Ha-yeon
Kim Ji-hyo
Kim Ji-yu
Kim Min-jae
Kim Si-hyun
Kim Yui
Lee Bo-seul
Lee Hae-na
Lee Ji-yoon
Lee Rae-in
Lee Yoon-seo
Lee Yu-na
Lim Chaer-yeong
Lim Sua
Noh Ye-rim
Park Chae-a
Park Ink-yong
Park Ha-ram
Park Ha-young
Park Ju-eun
Park Se-na
Seo Chae-eun
Yeon Chae-ju
Yoon Ji-min
Yu Na-young

== Senior results ==
=== Senior men ===
Men's results
Rank	Name	Total points	SP		FS	
1	Cha Jun-hwan	275.94	1	96.51	1	179.43
2	Lee Si-hyeong	241.05	2	85.06	3	155.99
3	Seo Min-kyu	232.62	6	73.72	2	158.90
4	Kim Hyun-gyeom	229.50	3	79.44	6	150.06
5	Lee Jae-keun	226.64	5	75.26	4	151.38
6	Cha Young-hyun	217.48	7	71.38	7	146.10
7	Choi Ha-bin	215.43	9	64.41	5	151.02
8	Lim Ju-heon	214.56	4	77.72	8	136.84
9	Kim Han-gil	192.27	8	68.00	9	124.27
10	Park Hyun-seo	149.00	10	55.90	10	93.10

=== Senior women ===
Women's results
Rank	Name	Total points	SP		FS	
1	Shin Ji-a	218.36	1	69.08	1	149.28
2	Lee Hae-in	205.84	3	68.43	3	137.41
3	Kim Chae-yeon	205.33	9	63.36	2	141.97
4	Kim Yu-seong	200.73	7	64.93	4	135.80
5	Kim Yu-jae	198.47	4	66.04	5	132.43
6	Kwon Min-sol	197.03	5	66.01	6	131.02
7	You Young	195.96	2	68.96	7	127.00
8	Youn Seo-jin	185.57	6	65.91	9	119.66
9	Hwang Jeong-youl	182.09	10	61.65	8	120.45
10	Lee Hyo-rin	178.20	12	59.65	10	118.55
11	Ko Na-yeon	177.26	11	60.35	11	116.91
12	Wi Seo-yeong	175.29	8	64.82	15	110.47
13	Choi Da-bin	174.64	13	58.20	12	116.44
14	Han Hee-sue	173.28	14	57.20	13	116.08
15	Kim Seo-young	166.67	15	55.56	14	111.31
16	Park Eun-bi	157.84	19	50.09	16	107.75
17	Jin Ju-eun	155.45	18	50.59	17	104.86
18	Hong Seun-ga	148.83	17	51.49	18	97.34
19	Song Si-woo	144.35	21	47.89	19	96.46
20	Lee Eun	143.65	16	51.67	20	91.98
21	Son Da-on	137.68	20	49.51	21	88.17
22	Yook Jeong-min	110.01	22	39.25	22	70.76
WD	Yun Ah-sun	withdrew	withdrew from competition			

=== Senior ice dance ===
Ice dance results
Rank	Name	Total points	RD		FD	
1	Hannah Lim / Ye Quan	186.29	1	70.41	1	115.88

== Junior results ==
=== Junior men ===
Junior men's results
Rank	Name	Total points	SP		FS	
1	Yu Dong-han	160.06	1	55.86	1	104.20
2	Chung Jae-wook	142.00	3	48.17	2	93.83
3	Kim Tae-hwan	135.13	4	42.85	3	92.28
4	Kim Aaron	132.15	2	49.98	4	82.17
5	Kim Ye-sung	122.66	5	42.08	5	80.58
6	Choi Ye-hwang	109.86	7	34.79	6	75.07
7	Choi Ye-chang	102.17	6	36.08	7	66.09

=== Junior women ===
Junior women's results
Rank	Name	Total points	SP		FS	
1	Jang Ha-rin	156.75	4	50.23	1	106.52
2	Lee Ji-yoon	155.48	3	50.52	2	104.96
3	Kim Ji-yu	154.20	1	53.64	4	100.56
4	Kim Gun-hee	153.65	2	52.90	3	100.75
5	Joo Hye-won	140.23	6	48.31	5	91.92
6	Cha Doi	138.15	5	49.75	8	88.40
7	Park Ink-yong	135.35	7	46.60	6	88.75
8	Park Ha-young	130.21	9	45.38	9	84.83
9	Park Se-na	129.85	12	41.38	7	88.47
10	Jeon Chae-eun	123.42	8	46.09	11	77.33
11	Yu Na-young	121.01	11	43.21	10	77.80
12	Kim Ji-hyo	114.16	10	43.36	14	70.80
13	Lee Yoon-seo	111.12	16	38.77	13	72.35
14	Kim Ga-heun	108.33	24	34.68	12	73.65
15	Kim Ha-yeon	106.66	15	38.94	16	67.72
16	Cho Ha-yul	105.50	14	39.78	19	65.72
17	Cho Yun-ha	104.02	22	35.12	15	68.90
18	Park Chae-a	103.92	13	39.94	21	63.98
19	Lee Rae-in	103.73	17	37.42	17	66.31
20	Choi Soi	102.34	20	36.62	18	65.72
21	Lim Sua	101.86	19	36.82	20	65.04
22	Lim Chaer-yeong	94.67	18	36.96	22	57.71
23	Yoon Ji-min	93.11	21	35.58	23	57.53
24	Park Ha-ram	90.21	23	34.92	24	55.29
Did not advance to free skating
25	Kim Si-hyun	34.61	25	34.61	—N/a	
26	Seo Chae-eun	33.90	26	33.90	—N/a	
27	Lee Yu-na	32.43	27	32.43	—N/a	
28	Jo Ha-yeon	31.72	28	31.72	—N/a	
29	Lee Hae-na	31.09	29	31.09	—N/a	
30	Kim Chan	30.02	30	30.02	—N/a	
31	Park Ju-eun	28.56	31	28.56	—N/a	
32	Jung Sube-en	27.61	32	27.61	—N/a	
33	Yeon Chae-ju	26.73	33	26.73	—N/a	
34	Noh Ye-rim	25.41	34	25.41	—N/a	
WD	Hwang Ji-young	withdrew	withdrew from competition			
WD	Jeon Hyo-jin	withdrew	withdrew from competition			
WD	Jeong Ha-min	withdrew	withdrew from competition			
WD	Kim Bo-hwa	withdrew	withdrew from competition			
WD	Kim Ga-hyeon	withdrew	withdrew from competition			
WD	Kim Min-jae	withdrew	withdrew from competition			
WD	Kim Yui	withdrew	withdrew from competition			
WD	Lee Bo-seul	withdrew	withdrew from competition			

=== Junior ice dance ===
Junior ice dance results
Rank	Name	Total points	RD		FD	
1	Kim Jin-ny / Lee Na-mu	128.89	1	48.51	1	80.38

== International team selections ==
=== Winter Youth Olympics ===
The 2024 Winter Youth Olympics were held in Gangneung, South Korea from 27 January to 1 February 2024.

	Men	Women	Ice dance
1	Kim Hyun-gyeom	Shin Ji-a	Kim Jin-ny / Lee Na-mu
2		Kim Yu-seong	

=== Four Continents Championships ===
The 2024 Four Continents Championships were held in Shanghai, China from January 30 to February 4, 2024.

	Men	Women	Ice dance
1	Cha Jun-hwan	Kim Chae-yeon	Hannah Lim / Ye Quan
2	Cha Young-hyun	Lee Hae-in	
3	Lim Ju-heon	Wi Seo-yeong	
1st alt.	Kim Han-gil	You Young	

=== World Junior Championships ===
Commonly referred to as "Junior Worlds", the 2024 World Junior Championships were held in Taipei, Taiwan from February 26 to March 3, 2024.

	Men	Women	Ice dance
1	Seo Min-kyu	Shin Ji-a	Kim Jin-ny / Lee Na-mu
2	Lee Jae-keun	Kim Yu-seong	
3		Kim Yu-jae	
1st alt.	Choi Ha-bin	Youn Seo-jin	

=== World Championships ===
The 2024 World Championships were held in Montreal, Canada, from March 18–24, 2024.

	Men	Women	Ice dance
1	Cha Jun-hwan	Lee Hae-in	Hannah Lim / Ye Quan
2	Lee Si-hyeong	Kim Chae-yeon	
3	Kim Hyun-gyeom	You Young	
