= Seo Min-kyu =

South Korean figure skater (born 2008)

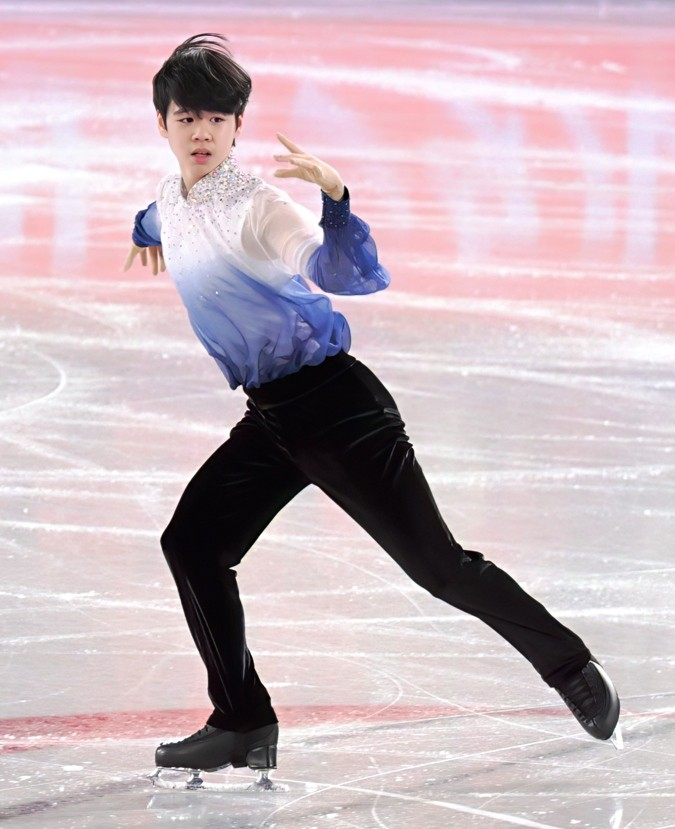
- Seo during the short program at the 2024–25 Junior Grand Prix Final

Personal information
- Native name: 서민규
- Other names: Minkyu Seo; Seo Minkyu
- Born: October 14, 2008 (age 18) Daegu, South Korea
- Home town: Daegu, South Korea
- Height: 1.63 m (5 ft 4 in)

Figure skating career
- Country: South Korea
- Coach: Kim Eun-ju; Choi Hyung-kyung
- Skating club: Daegu Indoor Icerink
- Began skating: 2011

Medal record
South Korean Championships
Silver medal – second place	2025 Uijeongbu	Singles
Silver medal – second place	2026 Seoul	Singles
Bronze medal – third place	2023 Uijeongbu	Singles
Bronze medal – third place	2024 Uijeongbu	Singles
World Junior Championships
Gold medal – first place	2024 Taipei	Singles
Silver medal – second place	2025 Debrecen	Singles
Silver medal – second place	2026 Tallinn	Singles
Junior Grand Prix Final
Gold medal – first place	2025–26 Nagoya	Singles
Silver medal – second place	2024–25 Grenoble	Singles

Seo Min-kyu (Korean: 서민규; born 14 October 2008) is a South Korean figure skater. He is the 2026 Grand Prix de France bronze medalist and a four-time South Korean national medalist (2023–26).

On the junior level, he is the 2024 Junior World champion, the 2025-26 Junior Grand Prix Final champion, a two-time Junior World silver medalist (2025, 2026), the 2024–25 Junior Grand Prix Final silver medalist, a six-time ISU Junior Grand Prix medalist, and the 2022 South Korean junior champion.

Seo is the first South Korean man to both medal at and win the World Junior Championships.

== Personal life ==
Seo was born on October 14, 2008, in Daegu, South Korea.

== Career ==
=== Early years ===
Seo began skating in 2011 at the age of four. Initially skating recreationally, he later became inspired to pursue competitive figure skating after witnessing Cha Jun-hwan's achievements. His mother, Kim Eun-ji, is one of his coaches. Although most top-level Korean figure skaters that move to city of Seoul to train, Seo elects to train at the rink in his hometown of Daegu despite its lack of competitive environment.

Seo's first international competition was the 2019 Asian Open Trophy in advanced novice, where he finished in sixth place. He won the national junior gold medal at the 2022 South Korean Championships.

=== 2022–23 season: Junior international debut ===
Making his international junior debut on the Junior Grand Prix at the 2022 JGP Czech Republic in Ostrava, Seo finished first in the short program after a clean skate, where he scored 74.39 points. He cleanly landed most of his jumps in the free skate, only to fall at the triple Salchow-double Axel sequence and edge calls on two Lutz jumps. He finished fourth overall. In early October, he competed in his second event on the circuit, the 2022 JGP Poland II in Gdańsk. He ranked fourth in the short program and third in the free, winning the bronze medal. He was named the third of three alternates for 2022–23 Junior Grand Prix Final. He would subsequently compete on the senior level at the annual South Korean Ranking Competition, where he won the bronze medal.

In January, at the 2023 South Korean Championships, Seo placed fourth in the short program. He placed second in the free skate, 11.17 points behind Cha Jun-hwan, and won the bronze medal. Seo was named the first alternate for the 2023 World Junior Championships in Calgary.

=== 2023–24 season: World Junior champion ===
In late July, Seo competed at the 2023 South Korean ISU Junior Grand Prix Qualifiers, where he won the gold medal, thus earning two assignments on the Junior Grand Prix circuit. He placed fifth at the 2023 JGP Thailand. At his second, the 2023 JGP Turkey, he won both segments of the competition and took the gold medal. As well, he successfully landed a triple Axel for the first time in international competition, which he cited as a point of pride. With these results, Seo was named as the second alternate for the 2023–24 Junior Grand Prix Final.

He went on to compete on the senior level at the annual South Korean Ranking Competition, winning the silver medal. In January, he competed at the 2024 South Korean Championships, where he won his second consecutive bronze medal. With this result, Seo was selected to represent South Korea at the 2024 World Junior Championships.

Competing at the World Junior Championships in Taipei, Seo won the short program with a clean skate. He was narrowly second in the free skate after singling one of his planned triple Axels, finishing 1.54 points behind Japan's Rio Nakata, but remained first overall by 1.44 points and claimed the gold medal. This was the first Junior World medal for a South Korean man. Seo said that he viewed the result as a vindication of his belief in importance of program components in addition to the technical elements.

=== 2024–25 season: JGP Final silver and World Junior silver ===
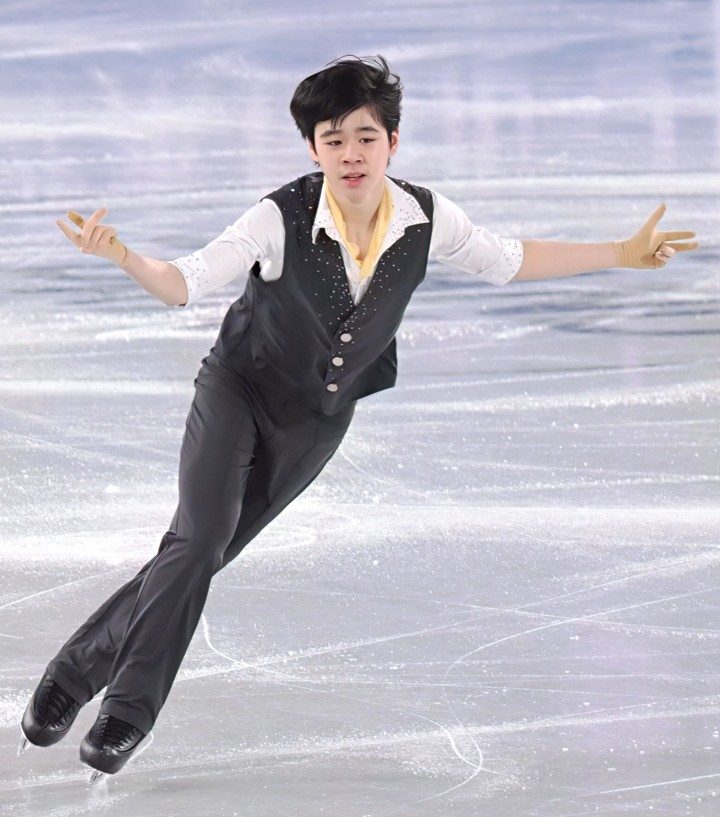
Seo during the free skate at the 2024–25 Junior Grand Prix Final

Seo began his season by winning gold at the domestic ISU Junior Grand Prix Qualifiers and was given two Junior Grand Prix assignments as a result of his placement. At the 2024 JGP Czech Republic, Seo placed third in the short program and second in the free skate but managed to accumulate enough points to win the gold medal. He went on to take bronze at 2024 JGP Poland after placing eleventh in the short program but winning the free skate. With these results, Seo qualified for the 2024–25 Junior Grand Prix Final.

In late November, Seo competed on the senior level at the annual South Korean Ranking Competition, where he won silver for a second consecutive time.

At the Junior Grand Prix Final in Grenoble, France, Seo placed fifth in the short program after falling on a triple flip attempt. He would, however, go to deliver a clean free skate, winning that segment of the competition and moving up to the silver medal position overall. Going on to compete at the 2025 South Korean Championships, Seo won the silver medal behind Cha Jun-hwan.

Assigned to compete at the 2025 World Junior Championships in Debrecen, Hungary, Seo won the short program, scoring a new personal best in the process. During the free skate, he fell on his second triple Axel attempt but otherwise skated the rest of the program cleanly. He placed second in that competition segment and won the silver medal overall behind Rio Nakata of Japan. Following this, he said, "I was very nervous about today’s performance, overall it was a happy day. I had many competitions this season and I am happy to end it with a medal at the Junior World Championships... For next season I really want to work on my quads. I see Rio with his quads and I really want to do it as well."

In an interview in an interview in April, Seo announced his music for the 2025-26 figure skating season and that he spent time training in Vancouver, Canada at the Connaught Skating Club and Coquitlam Skating Club, working with Keegan Murphy and Bruno Delmaestro, respectively.

=== 2025–26 season: JGP Final gold and second World Junior silver ===
Seo started the season by winning gold at the domestic ISU Junior Grand Prix Qualifiers and was given two Junior Grand Prix assignments as a result of his placement. The following month, he won gold medals at both the 2025 JGP Turkey and the 2025 JGP Azerbaijan. With these results, he qualified for the 2025–26 Junior Grand Prix Final. At the competition, Seo placed second in the short program, first at the free skate, and first overall, making him the first South Korean male skater to win a Junior Grand Prix Final and the first skater to earn the title in 20 years since Yuna Kim in 2005.

In January, Seo won the silver medal behind Cha Jun-hwan at the 2026 South Korean Championships.

At the 2026 World Junior Figure Skating Championships held in Tallinn, Estonia, Seo finished with a season's best score. He went on to place third in the free skate to win the silver medal behind Japan's Rio Nakata. "Even though I made a mistake on my first jump, I tried to overcome it step by step and focus on the next elements," said Seo after the free skate. "It was a difficult situation after making that mistake, but I tried to recover through the rest of the program, and that was the good thing about this free skate—to still skate a clean program after that and fight until the end. That was very good. I am very happy to finish in second place here."

=== 2026–27 season: Senior international debut ===
Seo debuted internationally as a senior skater at the 2026 Kinoshita Group Cup. Seo placed 9th in the short program segment after a fall on his triple Axel attempt and missing the required combination jump. He redeemed himself in the free skate, placing 1st in that segment; finishing the event in 4th place overall.

In October, Seo made his senior Grand Prix debut at the 2026 Grand Prix de France, placing third in both segments and overall, he won the bronze medal. Following the competition, Seo shared that he had been injured prior to the event, having only prepared for one week, "I had a back injury and was only able to resume training a week before this competition, so I didn't have enough time to prepare. But since this was my first senior Grand Prix, I wanted to show my best."

== Programs ==
Season	Short program	Free skating	Exhibition
2026–2027	El Toque De Rafa by Andrés Cantú; Canción del Mariachi (from Desperado) choreo. by Shin Yea-ji	The Umbrellas of Cherbourg by Michel Legrand; The Umbrellas of Cherbourg performed by Peter Breiner & His Symphonic Pop Orchestra; I Will Wait for You performed by Mario Pelchat choreo. by Shin Yea-ji	I Hear a Symphony by The Supremes performed by Cody Fry choreo. by Jung You-jin
2025–2026	Moonlight Sonata by Ludwig van Beethoven performed by Jenő Jandó choreo. by Elizabeth Chan, Patrick Chan; Czardas by Vittorio Monti performed by LAYERS CLASSIC choreo. by Elizabeth Chan, Patrick Chan	Exogenesis: Symphony Part 3: Redemption by Muse choreo. by Elizabeth Chan, Patrick Chan	I Hear a Symphony by The Supremes performed by Cody Fry choreo. by Jung You-jin
2024–2025	Moonlight Sonata by Ludwig van Beethoven performed by Jenő Jandó choreo. by Elizabeth Chan, Patrick Chan	Singin' in the Rain (from Singin' in the Rain) by Gene Kelly choreo. by Shin Yea-ji	
2023–2024	Flower Dance by DJ Okawari performed by LAYERS CLASSIC choreo. by Elizabeth Chan, Patrick Chan	Le temps des cathédrales (from Notre-Dame de Paris) by Luc Plamondon & Riccardo Cocciante performed by Josh Groban choreo. by Elizabeth Chan, Patrick Chan	Snow Globe by Forestella
2022–2023	You Are My Destiny by Paul Anka choreo. by Elizabeth Chan, Patrick Chan	Cinema Paradiso by Ennio Morricone, Andrea Morricone choreo. by Elizabeth Chan, Patrick Chan	Human by Rag'n'Bone Man choreo. by Patrick Chan
2021–2022	Eye of the Tiger by Survivor performed by FJØRA, Tommee Profitt choreo. by Elizabeth Chan, Patrick Chan	Cinema Paradiso by Ennio Morricone, Andrea Morricone choreo. by Elizabeth Chan, Patrick Chan	
2019–2020	Moonlight Sonata by Ludwig van Beethoven	Jeon Woo-chi by Lee Pil-ho	

== Competitive highlights ==
- GP – Event of the ISU Grand Prix Series
- CS – Event of the ISU Challenger Series
- TBD – Assigned
- WD – Withdrew from competition

Competition placements at senior level
Season	2022–23	2023–24	2024–25	2025–26	2026–27
South Korean Championships	3rd	3rd	2nd	2nd	
GP Cup of China					7th
GP France					3rd
CS Kinoshita Group Cup					4th

- JGP – Event of the ISU Junior Grand Prix Series

Competition placements at junior level
Season	2021–22	2022–23	2023–24	2024–25	2025–26
World Junior Championships			1st	2nd	2nd
Junior Grand Prix Final				2nd	1st
South Korean Championships	1st				
JGP Azerbaijan					1st
JGP Czech Republic		4th		1st	
JGP Poland		3rd		3rd	
JGP Thailand			5th		
JGP Turkey			1st		1st

== Detailed results ==
ISU personal best scores in the +5/-5 GOE System
Segment	Type	Score	Event
Total	**TSS**	**255.91**	2025-26 Junior Grand Prix Final
Short program	**TSS**	**86.68**	2025 World Junior Championships
Short program	TES	46.90	2025 World Junior Championships
Short program	PCS	39.78	2025 World Junior Championships
Free skating	**TSS**	**180.88**	2026 Kinoshita Group Cup
Free skating	TES	95.97	2026 Kinoshita Group Cup
Free skating	PCS	84.91	2026 Kinoshita Group Cup

Current personal best scores are highlighted in bold.

=== Senior level ===
Results in the 2022-23 season
Date	Event	SP		FS		Total	
Date	Event	P	Score	P	Score	P	Score
Jan 5–8, 2023	(South Korea) 2023 South Korean Championships	4	76.90	2	159.00	3	235.90

Results in the 2023-24 season
Date	Event	SP		FS		Total	
Date	Event	P	Score	P	Score	P	Score
Jan 4–7, 2024	(South Korea) 2024 South Korean Championships	6	72.32	2	158.90	3	232.62

Results in the 2024-25 season
Date	Event	SP		FS		Total	
Date	Event	P	Score	P	Score	P	Score
Jan 2–5, 2025	(South Korea) 2025 South Korean Championships	5	79.18	2	167.60	2	246.78

Results in the 2025–26 season
Date	Event	SP		FS		Total	
Date	Event	P	Score	P	Score	P	Score
Jan 3–6, 2026	(South Korea) 2026 South Korean Championships	2	91.54	2	177.77	2	269.31

Results in the 2026-27 season
Date	Event	SP		FS		Total	
Date	Event	P	Score	P	Score	P	Score
Sep 4–6, 2026	(Japan) 2026 CS Kinoshita Group Cup	9	70.19	1	180.88	4	251.07
Oct 23-25, 2026	2026 Grand Prix de France	3	83.83	3	161.07	3	244.90

=== Junior level ===
2025–26 season
Date	Event	SP	FS	Total
March 3–8, 2026	2026 World Junior Championships	2; 86.33	3; 157.58	2; 243.91
December 4–7, 2025	2025–26 Junior Grand Prix Final	2; 84.82	1; **171.09**	1; **255.91**
September 23–26, 2025	2025 JGP Azerbaijan	1; 82.67	1; 153.78	1; 236.45
August 27–30, 2025	2025 JGP Turkey	2; 81.46	1; 161.81	1; 243.27
2024–25 season
Date	Event	SP	FS	Total
February 25–March 2, 2025	2025 World Junior Championships	1; **86.68**	2; 154.77	2; 241.45
December 5–8, 2024	2024–25 Junior Grand Prix Final	5; 69.68	1; 152.46	2; 222.14
September 25–28, 2024	2024 JGP Poland	11; 57.18	1; 138.68	3; 195.86
September 4–9, 2024	2024 JGP Czech Republic	3; 77.08	2; 147.70	1; 224.78
2023–24 season
Date	Event	SP	FS	Total
Feb. 26 – Mar. 3, 2024	2024 World Junior Championships	1; 80.58	2; 150.17	1; 230.75
September 6–9, 2023	2023 JGP Turkey	2; 75.67	1; 155.63	1; 231.30
August 23–26, 2023	2023 JGP Thailand	5; 67.40	4; 128.72	5; 196.12
2022–23 season
Date	Event	SP	FS	Total
October 5–8, 2022	2022 JGP Poland II	4; 72.36	3; 134.31	3; 206.67
Aug. 31 – Sept. 3, 2022	2022 JGP Czech Republic	1; 74.39	4; 135.20	4; 209.59
2021–22 season
Date	Event	SP	FS	Total
January 7–9, 2022	2022 South Korean Championships	1; 61.21	1; 126.12	1; 187.33
