= Audrey Shin =

American figure skater (born 2004)

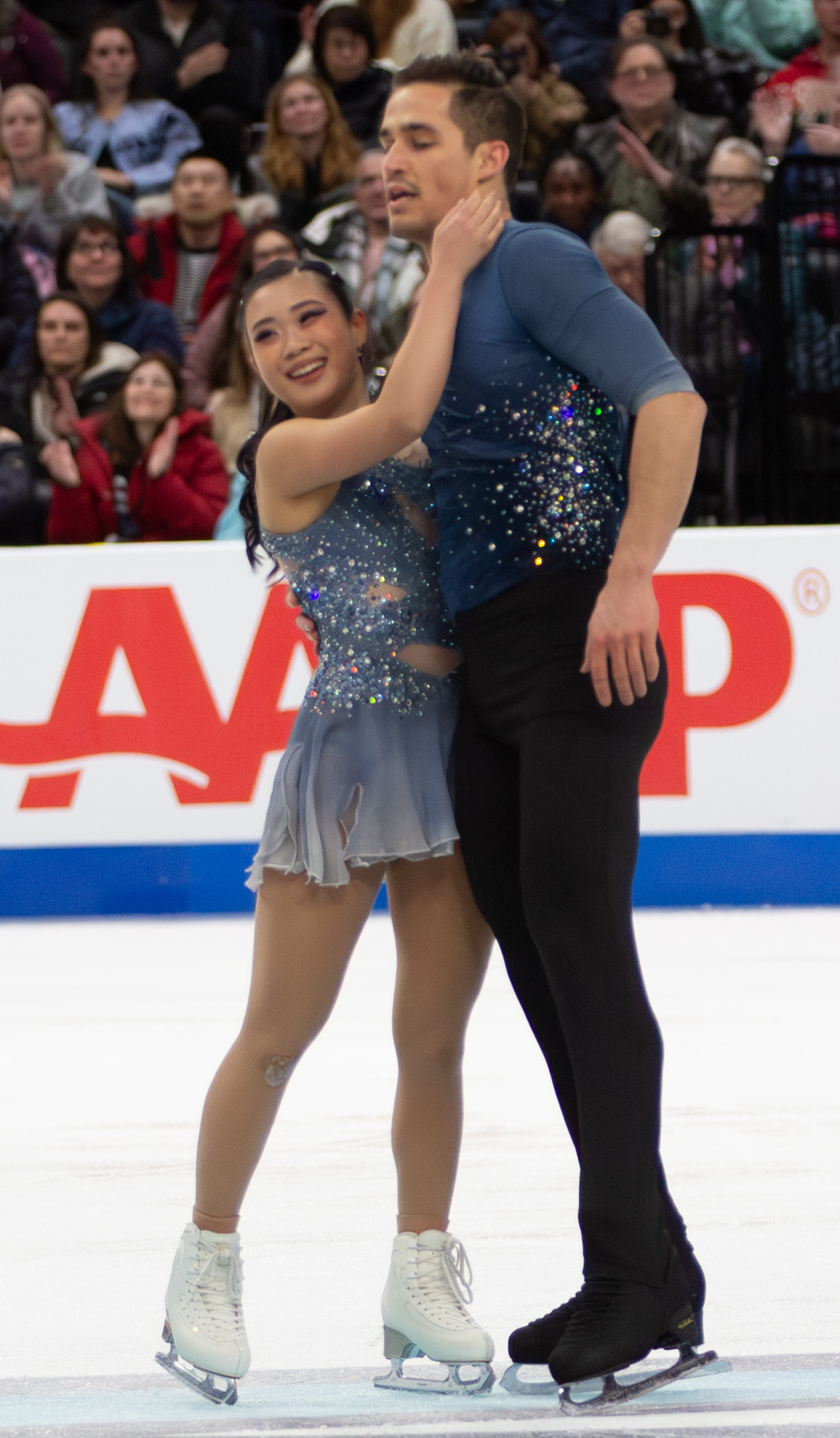
- Audrey Shin and Balázs Nagy at the 2026 U.S. Championships

Personal information
- Native name: 신수민/愼秀慜
- Full name: Audrey Sumin Shin
- Born: March 12, 2004 (age 22) Smithtown, New York, U.S.
- Home town: Northport, New York, U.S.
- Height: 5 ft 2 in (1.58 m)

Figure skating career
- Country: United States
- Discipline: Pair skating (since 2024); Women's singles (2014–24)
- Partner: Spencer Howe (since 2026); Balázs Nagy (2024–26)
- Coach: Alexei Letov; Olga Ganicheva
- Skating club: Skating Club of New York
- Began skating: 2010

Audrey Sumin Shin (born March 12, 2004) is an American figure skater who currently competes in the pairs discipline. With her partner Spencer Howe, she is the 2026 Finlandia Trophy bronze medalist.

With former partner Balázs Nagy, she is the 2025 Golden Spin of Zagreb gold medalist.

As a singles skater, she is the 2020 Skate America bronze medalist, the 2021 CS Lombardia Trophy bronze medalist, and finished fourth at the 2022 Four Continents Championships. On the junior level, she is the 2019 U.S. junior silver medalist and finished in the top ten at the 2020 Winter Youth Olympics.

== Personal life ==
Shin was born on March 12, 2004, in Smithtown, New York, to parents Eric Shin, a commercial film director from South Korea who studied film in the United States, and Nicole Shin, a second-generation immigrant. Shin has a younger sister, Sydney.

Shin is pursuing a degree in Health Sciences at the University of Colorado Colorado Springs, with aspirations to specialize in sports medicine and traditional Korean (韓方) and Chinese medicine (TCM, 中醫) to support athletes in injury recovery.

== Career ==
=== Early career ===
Shin began skating in 2010 at the age of five, after a new ice rink was built next to her family’s church. Her father, Eric, a former speed skater in his youth, encouraged both Shin and her sister to try skating recreationally. She quickly fell in love with the sport and chose to pursue it competitively.

Her first skating coaches were Cathryn Schwab at age six (The Rinx, Hauppauge, NY), Craig Maurizi at age seven to nine (Ice House, NJ), and later Mary Lynn Gelderman, with whom she trained until she turned twelve at Dix Hills Ice Rink in Long Island, NY.

Shin made her debut at the U.S. Championships in 2014 at the juvenile level, placing ninth.

In 2016, she relocated with her mother from Long Island, New York, to Lakewood, California, to train under Rafael Arutyunyan. That same year, she received her first international assignment at the 2016 Golden Bear of Zagreb, where she won the silver medal at the advanced novice level.

At the 2017 U.S. Championships, Shin placed ninth at the novice level. Later that season, she competed at the 2017 Asian Open and finished seventh in the junior division.

At the 2018 U.S. Championships, Shin advanced to the junior level and once again placed ninth.

=== Singles skating career ===
==== 2018–2019 season: Junior national silver medalist ====
Prior to the season, Shin moved from Lakewood, California to Colorado Springs, Colorado to train under Tammy Gambill.

She started the season at the 2018 JGP Amber Cup, where she placed seventh. In January, Shin competed at the 2019 U.S. Championships at the junior level, where she placed second behind Gabriella Izzo. Shin was then assigned to compete at the 2019 Egna Spring Trophy, where she placed fourth at the junior level. Shin underwent ankle surgery in May 2019 to remove a ganglion cyst and was unable to train for a month following the surgery. After the operation, she had to relearn how to walk.

==== 2019–2020 season: Youth Winter Olympian ====
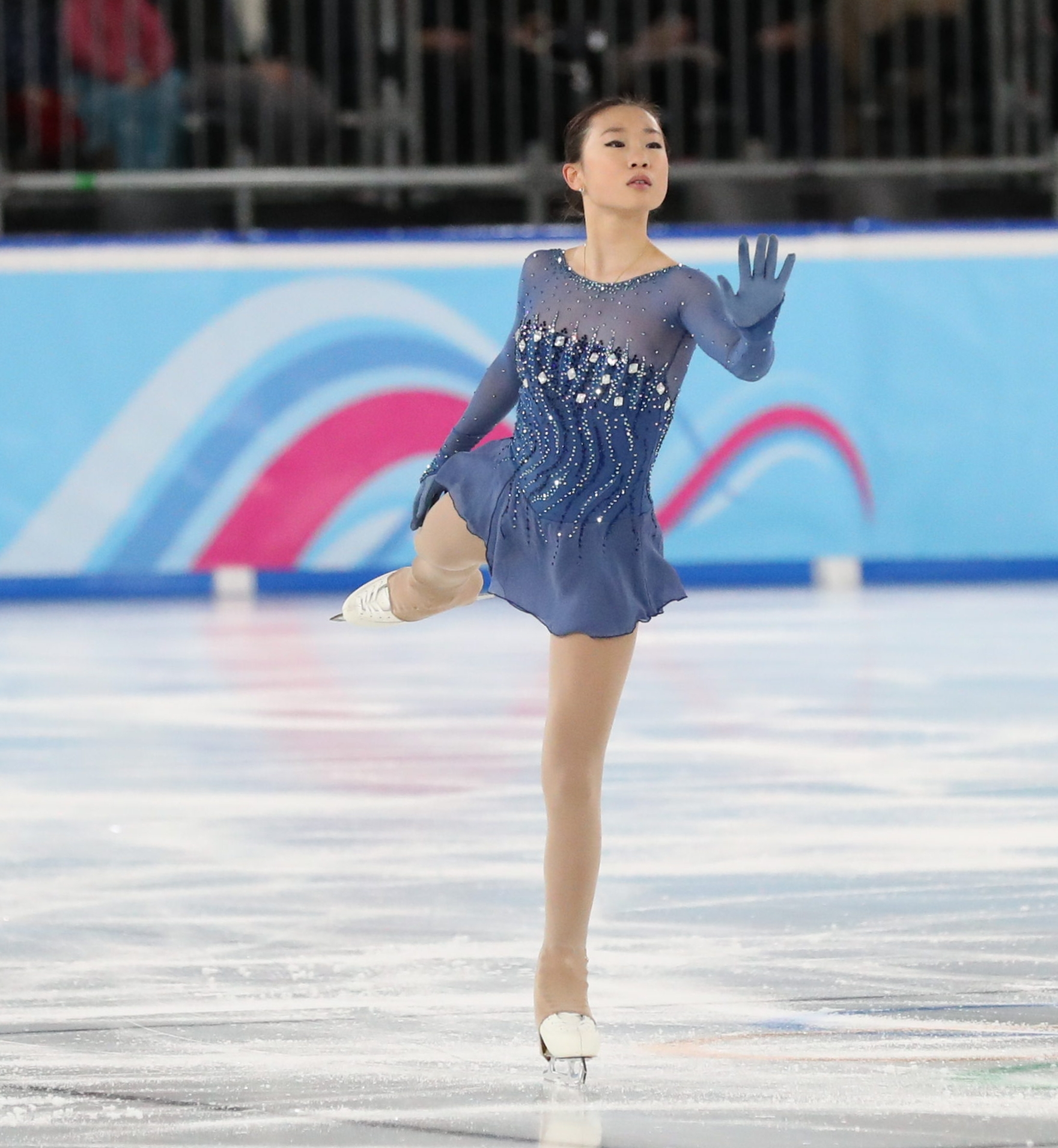
Shin at the 2020 Winter Youth Olympics

Shin began the season with a silver medal at the 2019 Philadelphia Summer international at the junior level and was assigned to JGP Russia, where she placed twelfth.

Shin experienced several issues with her boots and blades that contributed to an unsuccessful start to the season. She failed to qualify for the 2020 U.S. Championships due to a sixth-place finish at the Eastern Sectional Final and coupled with her rough start to the season, considered quitting the sport. Shin was later assigned to compete at the 2020 Winter Youth Olympic Games in Lausanne, Switzerland, where she placed seventh. Shin described the Youth Winter Olympics as a "huge motivating factor" in her career.

==== 2020–2021 season: Senior international debut and first Grand Prix medal ====
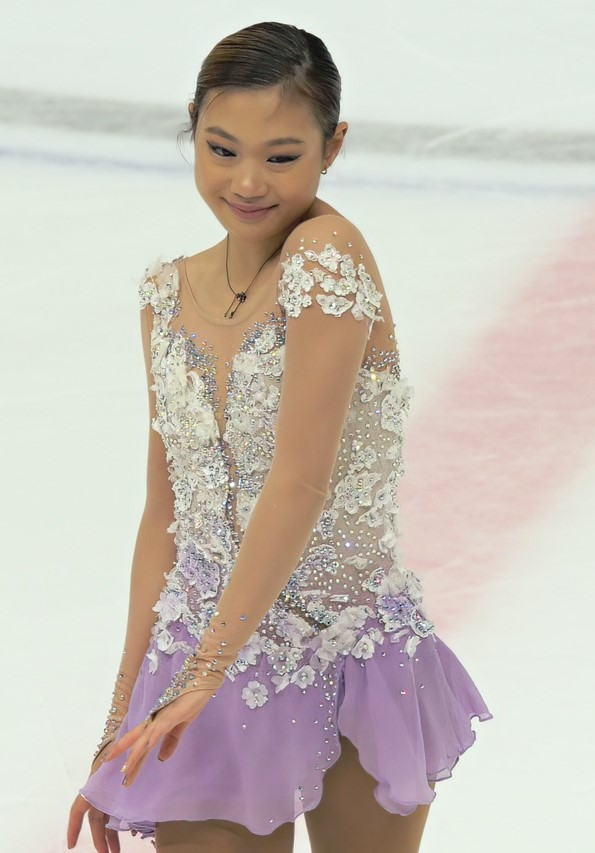
Shin at the 2021 CS Cup of Austria

Due to the COVID-19 pandemic, the 2020–21 ISU Junior Grand Prix, where Shin intended to compete, was canceled. She was instead assigned to the modified Grand Prix event, 2020 Skate America. After skating without errors on her jumping passes, Shin won a medal in her senior international debut by finishing in third place behind Mariah Bell and Bradie Tennell. Although her scores were personal bests, the domestic nature of the event meant that they would not count as official ISU records.

Competing at the 2021 U.S. Championships at the senior level for the first time, Shin placed seventh. As a result, she was named third alternate for the 2021 World Championships team.

Shin stated that she was working on both a triple Axel and quadruple toe loop with her coach, Tammy Gambill.

==== 2021–2022 season ====
Shin dealt with an injury in the off-season that caused her to scrap plans to attempt to up her technical content for the new season. She began the season at her first Challenger event, the 2021 CS Lombardia Trophy, where she won the bronze medal. She was twelfth of twelve skaters at the 2021 Skate America, and went on to finish fourth at the 2021 CS Cup of Austria.

Ninth in the short program at the 2022 U.S. Championships, Shin rose to sixth overall with a fifth-place free skate, despite several underrotated jumps. Her placement earned Shin an assignment to the 2022 Four Continents Championships. She was fifth in both segments and placed fourth overall with a new personal best score of 203.86. Speaking after, Shin said that she hoped to resume her efforts to introduce more difficult technical elements.

==== 2022−2023 season ====
Due to ongoing ankle problems, Shin initially scaled down her technical content at the start of the season. She began her season with a gold medal at the 2022 Cranberry Cup International. After feedback from judges at the event, she replaced her initial Tosca free skate with a modified version of her prior Michael W. Smith short program. She then went on to finish fourth at the 2022 CS U.S. International Figure Skating Classic. After the free skate there, she said, "it's a two-week-old program. So, it was very rushed trying to get into the choreography. I'm glad I performed decently, and I'm excited to build up from here."

On the Grand Prix circuit, Shin finished fifth at the 2022 Grand Prix de France. At her second event, the 2022 NHK Trophy, Shin finished fourth in the short program, less than three points back of third-place Rion Sumiyoshi. She was fifth in the free skate, but remained fourth overall, 4.12 points behind bronze medalist Sumiyoshi.

==== 2023−2024 season ====
For her new programs, Shin opted to fulfill a longstanding desire to skate to the soundtrack of Pina after it came up in a school project, using it in the short program. A fan of the music of Adele, her team selected "Skyfall" as a starting point and built a James Bond-themed program around it.

Shin finished fourth at the 2023 CS Autumn Classic International to start the season. Competing on the Grand Prix at the 2023 Skate Canada International, a clean short program performance put her in fourth place after the short program. She struggled with jump underrotations and a fall in the free skate, placing ninth in the segment and dropping to seventh overall. She went on to finish ninth at the 2023 Cup of China.

Following a disappointing ninth-place finish at the 2024 U.S. Championships, Shin began looking into the idea of switching to pair skating, a discipline that she had always enjoyed. She got in contact with former U.S. pair skaters, Chris Knierim and Brandon Frazier to help her learn various pair elements.

=== Pair skating with Balázs Nagy ===
==== 2024–2025 season: Debut of Shin/Nagy ====
Upon learning that Shin was interested in transitioning from singles to pair skating, U.S. pair skater, Balázs Nagy, contacted her and asked if she would be interested in having a tryout with him. Shin agreed to this and after a week of skating together, the pair agreed to form a partnership. They announced that Bruno Marcotte and Meagan Duhamel will serve as their head coaches, while they will also work with Audrey’s former coach, Tammy Gambill, in Colorado.

The pair began their season in December, winning the bronze medal at the 2024 CS Golden Spin of Zagreb.

The following month, Shin/Nagy competed at the 2025 U.S. Championships, placing fifth in the short program and third in the free skate, finishing fifth overall. While at the event, Shin spoke of her experience competing as a pair skater at Nationals for the first time, sharing, "It felt less stressful, and it’s nice having someone else out there on the ice with me, so it’s actually more fun than stressful." "We have been training fairly well, and I definitely feel confident in our training," said Nagy. "But nationals are nationals. There’s always more pressure, more everything. We haven’t had the best practices here this week, but I think we, well, I think she maximized everything.” Selected to compete at the 2025 Four Continents Championships in Seoul, South Korea, Shin/Nagy finished the season by finishing the event in eleventh place.

==== 2025–2026 season ====
Shin/Nagy opened the season with a seventh-place finish at the 2025 CS John Nicks International Pairs Competition. They then went on to compete at the 2025 Skate to Milano, the final qualifying event for the 2026 Winter Olympics, where they finished in sixth place.

Making their Grand Prix debut at the 2025 Grand Prix de France, Shin/Nagy placed fifth at the event overall. They subsequently won silver at the 2025 Ice Challenge and gold at the 2025 CS Golden Spin of Zagreb.

In January, they competed at the 2026 U.S. Championships, finishing in fifth place. "Overall, this competition, we had a really strong short and that’s something we’re super proud of," Shin said. "And, coming into the long, we felt a little bit more nervous, I think, but we still tried our best no matter what and tried to finish strong." They were subsequently named as the first alternates for the 2026 Winter Olympic and 2026 World team and to the 2026 Four Continents team. In the Four Continents Championship, they finished in seventh place.

In March 2026, Shin announced the end of her partnership with Nagy.

=== Partnership with Spencer Akira Howe ===
==== 2026–2027 season: First Grand Prix medal in Pairs ====
On June 13, Shin announced on Instagram her new partnership with American pair skater, Spencer Akira Howe.

The pair made their competitive debut at the 2026 John Nicks Pairs Challenge, where they finished second, ahead of Nagy and his new partner, Katie McBeath.

Shin and Howe then made their ISU Grand Prix debut at the 2026 Skate America, where they placed sixth.

The following week, they won the free skate and placed third overall at the 2026 Finlandia Trophy, earning Shin her first ever Grand Prix medal as a pairs skater. “We didn’t even know we’d be competing here until about three days ago,” said Howe. “To come here and deliver one of our best performances so far, especially as a new team, shows that we’re making really good progress. We’re incredibly grateful for these opportunities.”

== Programs ==
=== Pair skating with Balázs Nagy ===
| Season | Short program | Free skating | Exhibition |
|---|---|---|---|
| 2024–2025 | Lacrimosa (Techno Mix) by Wolfgang Amadeus Mozart performed by Rudolf-Christian Tvardochlib-Iascinschi; Prelude (Age Of Heroes) by Balázs Havasi choreo. by Julie Marcotte | River Flows In You; River Flows In You (Orchestra Version) by Yiruma choreo. by Drew Meekins | |
| 2025–2026 | The Godfather; Speak Softly Love by Nino Rota; Speak Softly Love performed by Yao Si Ting; The Godfather Suite by Drew Tretrick choreo. by John Kerr; El Tango de Roxanne (from Moulin Rouge!) performed by Ewan McGregor & José Feliciano choreo. by Tessa Virtue | Two Men in Love by The Irrepressibles choreo. by Silvia Fontana, John Zimmerman | |

=== Women's singles ===
| Season | Short program | Free skating | Exhibition |
|---|---|---|---|
| 2015–2016 | Pie Jesu by Andrew Lloyd Webber performed by Jackie Evancho choreo. by Inese Bucieva | Ladies in Lavender by Nigel Hess performed by Joshua Bell choreo. by Inese Bucieva | |
| 2016–2017 | Nella Fantasia performed by Celtic Woman choreo. by Adam Rippon | Giselle by Adolphe Adam choreo. by Adam Rippon | |
| 2017–2018 | Andante con moto e poco rubato (from Three Preludes) by George Gershwin arranged by Jascha Heifetz, Vilmos Szabadi performed by Yo-Yo Ma choreo. by Nadezda Kanaeva | Je me souviens de nous by Maxime Rodriguez choreo. by Benoît Richaud | |
| 2018–2019 | Via con me by Paolo Conte choreo. by Cindy Stuart | Romeo and Juliet by Nino Rota choreo. by Phillip Mills | |
| 2019–2020 | You Don't Give Up on Love by Mark Minkov choreo. by Ilona Melnichenko | The Sacred Bird (from Miss Saigon) by Claude-Michel Schönberg choreo. by Tom Dickson | |
| 2020–2021 | The Giving by Michael W. Smith choreo. by Drew Meekins | Modigliani; One Condition by Guy Farley choreo. by Tom Dickson | |
| 2021–2022 | The Giving by Michael W. Smith choreo. by Drew Meekins | Moonlight Sonata by Ludwig van Beethoven choreo. by Drew Meekins | |
| 2022–2023 | Yo Soy Maria by Astor Piazzolla choreo. by Pasquale Camerlengo | The Offering; The Giving; Heroes by Michael W. Smith choreo. by Drew Meekins; E lucevan le stelle (from Tosca) by Giacomo Puccini performed by Neville Marriner choreo. by Pasquale Camerlengo | Ghost; Overture by Dave Stewart and Glen Ballard; With You by Caissie Levy; Unchained Melody/The Love Inside by Richard Fleeshman and Caissie Levy |
| 2023–2024 | Lillies of the Valley; All Names (from Pina) by Thomas Hanreich and June Miyake choreo. by Cindy Stuart | Skyfall (from Skyfall) by Adele; Cuba Chase (from No Time to Die) by Hans Zimmer; Komodo Dragon (from Skyfall) by Thomas Newman choreo. by Pasquale Camerlengo | |

== Competitive highlights ==
- GP – Event of the ISU Grand Prix Series
- JGP – Event of the ISU Junior Grand Prix Series
- CS – Event of the ISU Challenger Series
- TBD – Assigned
- WD – Withdrew from competition

=== Pair skating with Spencer Howe ===
Competition placements at senior level
| Season | 2026–27 |
|---|---|
| GP Finland | 3rd |
| GP Skate America | 6th |
| CS John Nicks Pairs Challenge | 2nd |
| CS Nebelhorn Trophy | 2nd |

=== Pair skating with Balázs Nagy ===
Competition placements at senior level
| Season | 2024–25 | 2025–26 |
|---|---|---|
| Four Continents Championships | 11th | 7th |
| U.S. Championships | 5th | 5th |
| GP France | | 5th |
| CS Golden Spin of Zagreb | 3rd | 1st |
| CS John Nicks Pairs | | 7th |
| Ice Challenge | | 2nd |
| Skate to Milano | | 6th |

=== Women's singles ===
International
| Event | 17–18 | 18–19 | 19–20 | 20–21 | 21–22 | 22–23 | 23–24 |
|---|---|---|---|---|---|---|---|
| Four Continents | | | | | 4th | | |
| GP Cup of China | | | | | | | 9th |
| GP France | | | | | | 5th | |
| GP NHK Trophy | | | | | | 4th | |
| GP Skate America | | | | 3rd | 12th | | |
| GP Skate Canada | | | | | | | 7th |
| CS Autumn Classic | | | | | | | 4th |
| CS Cup of Austria | | | | | 4th | | |
| CS Lombardia Trophy | | | | | 3rd | | |
| CS U.S. Classic | | | | | | 4th | |
| Cranberry Cup | | | | | 4th | 1st | |
| Kings Cup | | | | | | | 1st |
International: Junior
| Youth Olympics | | | 7th | | | | |
| JGP Lithuania | | 11th | | | | | |
| JGP Russia | | | 12th | | | | |
| Asian Open | 7th | | | | | | |
| Egna Trophy | | 4th | | | | | |
| Philadelphia | | | 2nd | | | | |
National
| U.S. Champ. | 9th J | 2nd J | | 7th | 6th | 13th | 9th |

== Detailed results ==
=== Pair skating with Spencer Howe ===
ISU personal best scores in the +5/-5 GOE System
| Segment | Type | Score | Event |
|---|---|---|---|
| Total | **TSS** | **193.18** | 2026 Finlandia Trophy |
| Short program | **TSS** | **67.26** | 2026 Finlandia Trophy |
| Short program | TES | 37.00 | 2026 Finlandia Trophy |
| Short program | PCS | 30.86 | 2026 CS John Nicks Pairs Challenge |
| Free skating | **TSS** | **125.92** | 2026 Finlandia Trophy |
| Free skating | TES | 62.03 | 2026 Finlandia Trophy |
| Free skating | PCS | 63.89 | 2026 Finlandia Trophy |

Results in the 2026–27 season
| Date | Event | SP | | FS | | Total | |
| Date | Event | P | Score | P | Score | P | Score |
|---|---|---|---|---|---|---|---|
| Sep 11–12, 2026 | (United States) 2026 CS John Nicks Pairs Challenge | 3 | 67.25 | 2 | 116.56 | 2 | 183.81 |
| Sep 24–26, 2026 | (Germany) 2026 CS Nebelhorn Trophy | 2 | 66.46 | 3 | 111.37 | 2 | 177.83 |
| Nov 13–15, 2026 | (United States) 2026 Skate America | 6 | 64.86 | 6 | 106.32 | 6 | 171.18 |
| Nov 20–21, 2026 | (Finland) 2026 Finlandia Trophy | 4 | 67.26 | 1 | 125.92 | 3 | 193.18 |

=== Pair skating with Balázs Nagy ===
ISU personal best scores in the +5/-5 GOE System
| Segment | Type | Score | Event |
|---|---|---|---|
| Total | **TSS** | **194.00** | 2025 CS Golden Spin of Zagreb |
| Short program | **TSS** | **66.03** | 2025 CS Golden Spin of Zagreb |
| Short program | TES | 36.17 | 2025 CS Golden Spin of Zagreb |
| Short program | PCS | 29.86 | 2025 CS Golden Spin of Zagreb |
| Free skating | **TSS** | **127.97** | 2025 CS Golden Spin of Zagreb |
| Free skating | TES | 65.36 | 2025 CS Golden Spin of Zagreb |
| Free skating | PCS | 62.61 | 2025 CS Golden Spin of Zagreb |

Results in the 2024–25 season
| Date | Event | SP | | FS | | Total | |
| Date | Event | P | Score | P | Score | P | Score |
|---|---|---|---|---|---|---|---|
| Dec 5–7, 2024 | (Croatia) 2024 CS Golden Spin of Zagreb | 3 | 58.22 | 3 | 111.99 | 3 | 170.21 |
| Jan 20–26, 2025 | (United States) 2025 U.S. Championships | 5 | 62.06 | 3 | 120.61 | 5 | 182.67 |
| Feb 19–23, 2025 | (South Korea) 2025 Four Continents Championships | 10 | 51.70 | 11 | 76.66 | 11 | 128.36 |

Results in the 2025–26 season
| Date | Event | SP | | FS | | Total | |
| Date | Event | P | Score | P | Score | P | Score |
|---|---|---|---|---|---|---|---|
| Sep 2–3, 2025 | (United States) 2025 CS John Nicks International Pairs Competition | 7 | 59.64 | 7 | 106.12 | 7 | 165.76 |
| Sep 18–21, 2025 | (China) 2025 ISU Skate to Milano | 7 | 53.99 | 6 | 104.67 | 6 | 158.66 |
| Oct 17–19, 2025 | 2025 Grand Prix de France | 5 | 61.79 | 5 | 111.51 | 5 | 173.30 |
| Nov 5–9, 2025 | (Austria) 2025 Ice Challenge | 2 | 62.07 | 1 | 117.18 | 2 | 179.25 |
| Dec 3–6, 2025 | (Croatia) 2025 CS Golden Spin of Zagreb | 1 | 66.03 | 1 | 127.97 | 1 | 194.00 |
| Jan 4–11, 2026 | (United States) 2026 U.S. Championships | 2 | 67.67 | 5 | 117.43 | 5 | 185.10 |
| Jan 21–25, 2026 | (China) 2026 Four Continents Championships | 6 | 63.11 | 7 | 113.29 | 7 | 176.40 |

=== Women's singles ===
ISU personal best scores in the +5/-5 GOE System
| Segment | Type | Score | Event |
|---|---|---|---|
| Total | **TSS** | **203.86** | 2022 Four Continents Championships |
| Short program | **TSS** | **67.20** | 2022 Four Continents Championships |
| Short program | TES | 36.40 | 2024 CS Golden Spin of Zagreb |
| Short program | PCS | 31.53 | 2022 Grand Prix de France |
| Free skating | **TSS** | **136.66** | 2022 Four Continents Championships |
| Free skating | TES | 72.32 | 2022 Four Continents Championships |
| Free skating | PCS | 64.34 | 2022 Four Continents Championships |

==== Senior level ====
Current personal best scores are highlighted in bold.

**2023–2024 season**
| Date | Event | SP | FS | Total |
| January 22–28, 2024 | 2024 U.S. Championships | 7; 62.79 | 10; 112.82 | 9; 175.61 |
| November 10–12, 2023 | 2023 Cup of China | 10; 50.97 | 9; 105.87 | 9; 156.84 |
| October 27–29, 2023 | 2023 Skate Canada International | 4; 65.19 | 9; 111.95 | 7; 177.14 |
| October 5–7, 2023 | 2023 Kings Cup International | 2; 58.57 | 1; 112.88 | 1; 171.45 |
| September 14–17, 2023 | 2023 CS Autumn Classic International | 2; 60.07 | 4; 108.97 | 4; 169.04 |
**2022–2023 season**
| Date | Event | SP | FS | Total |
| January 23–29, 2023 | 2023 U.S. Championships | 9; 60.76 | 14; 100.36 | 13; 161.12 |
| November 18–20, 2022 | 2022 NHK Trophy | 4; 65.87 | 5; 123.13 | 4; 189.00 |
| November 4–6, 2022 | 2022 Grand Prix de France | 4; 64.27 | 5; 119.66 | 5; 183.93 |
| September 13–16, 2022 | 2022 CS U.S. Classic | 3; 61.16 | 5; 115.28 | 4; 176.44 |
| August 9–14, 2022 | 2022 Cranberry Cup International | 3; 56.20 | 2; 119.69 | 1; 175.89 |
**2021–2022 season**
| Date | Event | SP | FS | Total |
| January 18–23, 2022 | 2022 Four Continents Championships | 5; **67.20** | 5; **136.66** | 4; **203.86** |
| January 2–9, 2022 | 2022 U.S. Championships | 9; 61.77 | 5; 118.81 | 6; 180.58 |
| November 11–14, 2021 | 2021 CS Cup of Austria | 5; 54.58 | 3; 115.41 | 4; 169.99 |
| October 22–24, 2021 | 2021 Skate America | 9; 62.82 | 12; 97.97 | 12; 160.78 |
| September 10–12, 2021 | 2021 CS Lombardia Trophy | 5; 58.80 | 4; 113.66 | 3; 172.46 |
**2020–2021 season**
| Date | Event | SP | FS | Total |
| January 11–21, 2021 | 2021 U.S. Championships | 10; 57.74 | 6; 119.08 | 7; 176.82 |
| October 23–24, 2020 | 2020 Skate America | 3; 69.77 | 3; 136.38 | 3; 206.15 |

==== Junior level ====
**2019–2020 season**
| Date | Event | SP | FS | Total |
| January 10–15, 2020 | 2020 Winter Youth Olympics | 7; 60.36 | 7; 116.31 | 7; 176.67 |
| September 11–14, 2019 | 2019 JGP Russia | 19; 44.36 | 8; 98.93 | 12; 143.29 |
| Jul. 29 – Aug. 3, 2019 | 2019 Philadelphia Summer International | 2; 49.93 | 2; 93.57 | 2; 143.50 |
**2018–2019 season**
| Date | Event | SP | FS | Total |
| March 28–31, 2019 | 2019 Egna Spring Trophy | 1; 54.10 | 4; 90.84 | 4; 144.94 |
| January 19–27, 2019 | 2019 U.S. Championships | 6; 53.03 | 1; 112.58 | 2; 165.61 |
| September 5–8, 2018 | 2018 JGP Lithuania | 13; 44.85 | 11; 89.34 | 11; 134.19 |
**2017–2018 season**
| Date | Event | SP | FS | Total |
| Dec. 29, 2017 – Jan. 8, 2018 | 2018 U.S. Championships | 10; 46.05 | 5; 94.45 | 9; 140.50 |
| August 2–8, 2017 | 2017 Asian Open Trophy | 7; 42.60 | 7; 76.21 | 7; 118.81 |
