= 2026 CS John Nicks International Pairs Competition =

- Type: ISU Challenger Series
- Date: September 11 – 12
- Season: 2026–27
- Location: Norwood, Massachusetts, United States
- Host: Skating Club of New York, Skating Club of Boston, and U.S. Figure Skating
- Venue: Skating Club of Boston

Champions
- Pairs: (Individual Neutral Athletes) Aleksandra Boikova and Dmitrii Kozlovskii
- Previous: 2025 CS John Nicks International Pairs Competition
- Previous CS: 2026 CS Kinoshita Group Cup
- Next CS: 2026 CS Lombardia Trophy

The 2026 John Nicks International Pairs Competition was a figure skating competition sanctioned by the International Skating Union (ISU), organized and hosted by U.S. Figure Skating, and the third event of the 2026–27 ISU Challenger Series. It was held at the Skating Club of Boston in Norwood, Massachusetts, in the United States, from September 11 to 12, 2026. Medals were awarded in pair skating only, and skaters earned ISU World Standing points based on their results. Aleksandra Boikova and Dmitrii Kozlovskii of Russia, competing as Individual Neutral Athletes, won the event. Audrey Shin and Spencer Akira Howe of the United States finished in second place, and Katie McBeath and Balázs Nagy, also of the United States, finished in third.

== Background ==
The inaugural John Nicks Pairs Challenge was held in 2021 at the Sky Rink at Chelsea Piers in New York City, New York, in the United States. The competition is named in honor of John Nicks, a retired British figure skater who worked as a figure skating coach in the United States for nearly four decades.

The ISU Challenger Series was introduced in 2014. It is a series of international figure skating competitions sanctioned by the International Skating Union (ISU) and organized by ISU member nations. The objective was to ensure consistent organization and structure within a series of international competitions linked together, providing opportunities for senior-level skaters to compete at the international level and also earn ISU World Standing points. The 2026–27 Challenger Series consisted of thirteen events, of which the John Nicks International Pairs Competition was the third. The Cranberry Cup International was held in conjunction with the John Nicks Pairs Challenge – the former hosted the men's and women's events, while the latter hosted the pairs event – and the two competitions constituted U.S. Figure Skating's contribution to the Challenger Series.

For the 2026 edition, the event was hosted by the Skating Club of New York and the Skating Club of Boston from September 11 to 12, 2026, at the Skating Club of Boston's facility in Norwood, Massachusetts.

== Changes to preliminary assignments ==
The International Skating Union published the preliminary list of entrants on August 26, 2026.

Date	Withdrew	Added	Ref.
September 7	(United States); Starr Andrews; Daniil Parkman	(United States); Olivia Flores; Mark Sadusky	

== Required performance elements ==
=== Pair skating ===
Couples competing in pair skating first perform their short programs. Lasting no more than 2 minutes 40 seconds, the short program has to include the following elements: one pair lift, one double or triple twist lift, one double or triple throw jump, one double or triple solo jump, one pair spin combination, one death spiral, and one step sequence using the full ice surface.

Couples then perform their free skates. The free skate can last no more than 4 minutes, and has to include the following: two pair lifts, one twist lift, two different throw jumps, one solo jump, one jump combination or sequence, one choreographic pair spin, one choreographic pair lift and one death spiral.

== Judging ==
Skaters are judged according to the required technical elements of their program (such as jumps and spins), as well as the overall presentation of their program, based on three program components (skating skills, presentation, and composition). Each technical element in a figure skating performance is assigned a predetermined base point value and scored by a panel of nine judges on a scale from −5 to +5 based on the quality of its execution. Each Grade of Execution (GOE) from –5 to +5 is assigned a value as indicated on the Scale of Values. For example, a triple Axel is worth a base value of 8.00 points, and a GOE of +3 is worth 2.40 points, so a triple Axel with a GOE of +3 earns 10.40 points. The judging panel's GOE for each element is determined by calculating the trimmed mean (the average after discarding the highest and lowest scores). The panel's scores for all elements are added together to generate a Total Elements Score. At the same time, the judges evaluate each performance based on the five aforementioned program components and assign each a score from 0.25 to 10 in 0.25-point increments. The judging panel's final score for each program component is also determined by calculating the trimmed mean. Those scores are then multiplied by the factor shown on the chart below; the results are added together to generate a total Program Component Score.

Program component factoring
Discipline	Short program	Free skate
Pairs	1.33	2.67

Deductions are applied for certain violations, such as time infractions, stops and restarts, or falls. The Total Elements Score and Program Component Score are then added together, minus any deductions, to generate a final performance score for each skater or team.

== Medal summary ==
The 2026 John Nicks International Pairs Competition champions: Aleksandra Boikova and Dmitrii Kozlovskii of Russia

Medalists
Discipline	Gold	Silver	Bronze
Pairs	(Individual Neutral Athletes); Aleksandra Boikova; Dmitrii Kozlovskii	(United States); Audrey Shin; Spencer Akira Howe	(United States); Katie McBeath; Balázs Nagy

== Results ==
Event results
Rank	Team	Nation	Total points	SP		FS	
1st place, gold medalist(s)	Aleksandra Boikova; Dmitrii Kozlovskii	(Individual Neutral Athletes) Individual Neutral Athlete	198.66	1	70.39	1	128.27
2nd place, silver medalist(s)	Audrey Shin; Spencer Akira Howe	United States	183.81	3	67.25	2	116.56
3rd place, bronze medalist(s)	Katie McBeath; Balazs Nagy	United States	180.95	4	67.17	3	113.78
4	Karina Akopova; Nikita Rakhmanin	Armenia	176.51	2	68.03	4	108.48
5	Megan Wessenberg; Denys Strekalin	France	160.76	8	56.91	5	103.85
6	Miyu Yunoki; Tristan Taylor	Canada	154.38	7	60.69	6	93.69
7	Naomi Williams; Lachlan Lewer	United States	152.86	6	61.56	7	91.30
8	Jazmine Desrochers; Kieran Thrasher	Canada	149.19	5	62.20	8	86.99
9	Olivia Flores; Mark Sadusky	United States	132.29	9	56.10	11	76.19
10	Sydney Cooke; Matthew Kennedy	United States	129.26	10	46.67	9	82.59
11	Sarah Nunez; Blake Eisenach	United States	125.44	11	46.25	10	79.19

== Works cited ==
- "Sports Rules – Single & Pair Skating and Ice Dance" (PDF). International Skating Union. Archived (PDF) from the original on 24 May 2026.
