= Chelsea Liu =

American pair skater (born 1999)

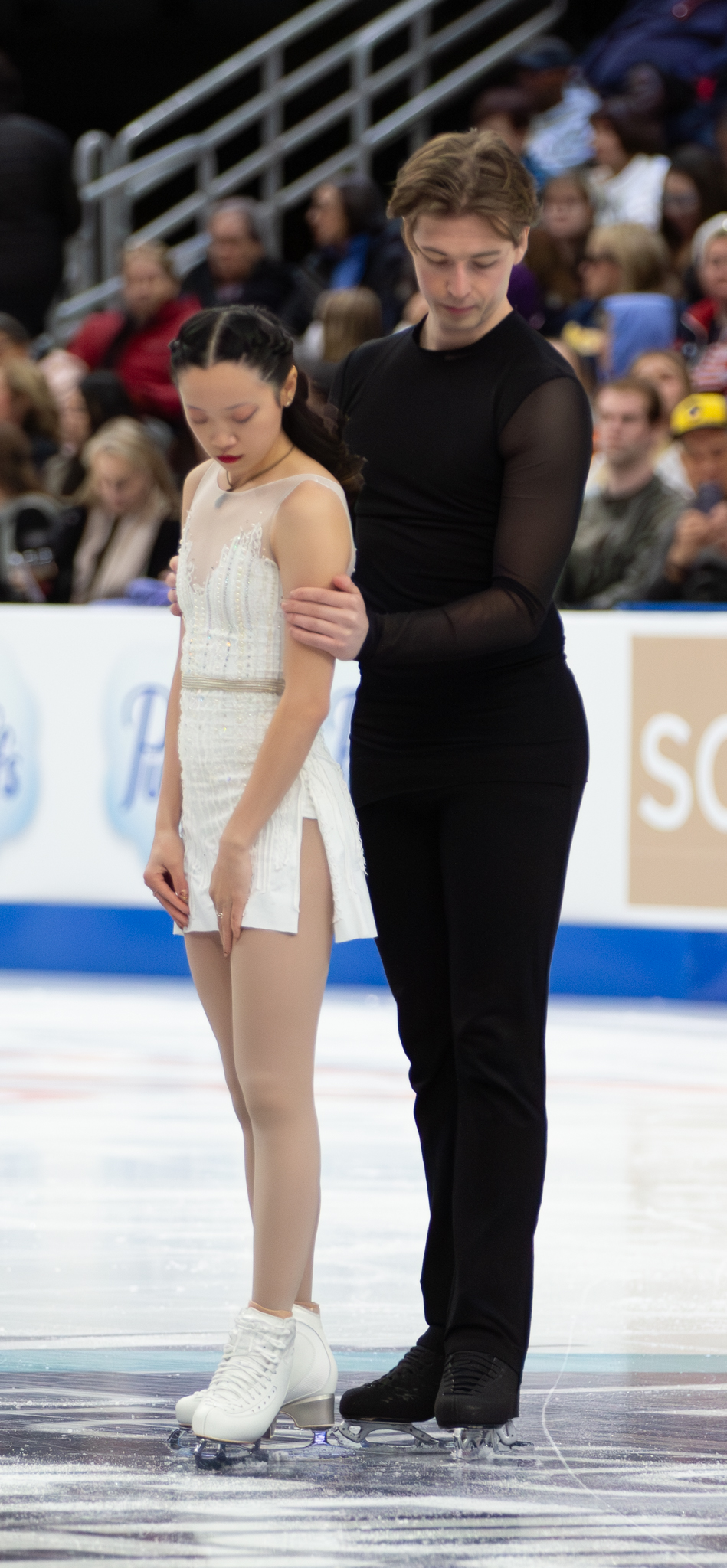
- Liu and Bedard at the 2026 U.S. Championships

Personal information
- Other names: Liu Jiaxi (刘家希)
- Born: December 31, 1999 (age 26) Marshall, Missouri, U.S.
- Home town: Irvine, California, U.S.
- Height: 5 ft 2 in (1.57 m)

Figure skating career
- Country: United States (2010–19, since 2021); China (2019–20)
- Discipline: Pair skating
- Partner: Ryan Bedard (since 2025); Balázs Nagy (2023–24); Danny O'Shea (2021–22); Xie Zhong (2019–20); Ian Meyh (2018–19); Brian Johnson (2014–18); Devin Perini (2010–14)
- Coach: Bruno Marcotte; Russ Scott; Chris Pottenger; Anthony Evans
- Skating club: Skating Club of New York
- Began skating: 2006

Medal record
Representing China
Chinese Championships
Bronze medal – third place	2020 Changchun	Pairs

Chelsea Liu (born December 31, 1999) is an American pair skater.

With her former partner, Balázs Nagy, she is the 2023 Skate America bronze medalist and 2024 U.S. national pewter medalist.

With Xie Zhong for China, Liu is the 2020 Chinese national bronze medalist.

With Brian Johnson, she won two medals on the ISU Challenger Series. They also competed together at one ISU Junior Grand Prix Final and two World Junior Championships.

== Personal life ==
Chelsea Liu was born December 31, 1999, in Marshall, Missouri. The daughter of Tingyuan Liu and Koman Ting, she has an older sister, Chaochih, who competed for Chinese Taipei, and a younger sister, Cheyenne.

== Career ==
=== Early years ===
Liu began skating in 2006. She teamed up with Devin Perini in July 2010. They debuted on the ISU Junior Grand Prix (JGP) series in 2013, placing fifth at both of their assignments, before winning the junior silver medal at the 2014 U.S. Championships.

=== Partnership with Brian Johnson for the United States ===
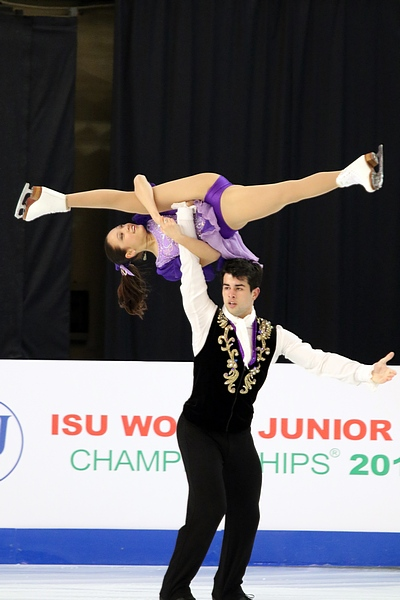
Liu and Johnson performing a pair lift at the 2016 World Junior Championships

Liu teamed up with Brian Johnson in May 2014. They were coached by Todd Sand and Jenni Meno in Orange County, California.

During the 2014–15 JGP series, Liu/Johnson won a bronze medal in Dresden, Germany and placed fourth in Zagreb, Croatia. Their results gave them a spot at the 2014–15 JGP Final in Barcelona, Spain, where the pair finished sixth. After winning the junior silver medal at the 2015 U.S. Championships, they were assigned to the 2015 World Junior Championships in Tallinn, Estonia. The pair placed fifth in the short program, 8th in the free skate, and seventh overall.

Competing in the 2015–16 JGP series, Liu/Johnson placed eighth in Linz, Austria and fifth in Toruń, Poland. Ranked fifth in both segments, the pair finished fifth at the 2016 World Junior Championships in Debrecen, Hungary.

The pair parted ways following a seventh-place finish at the 2018 U.S. Championships.

=== Partnership with Xie Zhong for China ===
==== 2019–20 season ====
Prior to the 2019–20 season, Liu teamed up with Chinese pair skater, Xie Zhong, to compete for China. Throughout the season, they competed at Chinese domestic events and won the bronze medal 2020 Chinese Championships. The pair parted ways at the end of the season.

=== Partnership with Danny O'Shea for the United States ===
==== 2021–22 season ====
On June 29, 2021, NBC Sports published an article announcing new partnership with Danny O'Shea.

Liu/O'Shea finished fifth in their international debut at the Cranberry Cup, and went on to make their Grand Prix debut together at the 2021 Skate America, where they came seventh. However, their partnership was derailed by an on-ice accident at the 2021 CS Warsaw Cup that left both concussed. They withdrew from the 2022 U.S. Championships, and ultimately their partnership ended.

=== Partnership with Balázs Nagy for the United States ===
==== 2023–24 season ====
Following the end of her partnership with O'Shea and requiring months off for concussion recovery, Liu contemplated retiring from competitive skating, later explaining that "I thought, 'You know, recover and live kind of a normal, safe life for the time being.' I took a whole eight months off the ice to recover and at that point I just didn't know if skating was in the picture for me." However, with encouragement from her parents to revisit whether she still wanted to pursue it, she tried out with Balázs Nagy in April 2023. The two announced their partnership in May.

Liu/Nagy made their domestic debut by winning the Glacier Falls Summer Classic, before being sent to make their international debut on the Challenger debut at the 2023 CS Autumn Classic International. They attracted notice for their innovative climactic lift in the free skate, but finished fourth. They were subsequently invited to make their Grand Prix debut at the 2023 Skate America, finishing third in the short program with a new personal best score (61.23). They were third in the free skate as well, despite Liu making two Salchow errors, winning the bronze medal. Liu said that "winning a medal on the Grand Prix is great, but what feels even better is that we put out a great program." Liu/Nagy went on to place sixth at the 2023 NHK Trophy.

In advance of the 2024 U.S. Championships, Liu/Nagy were preemptively assigned to the American team for the 2024 Four Continents Championships in Shanghai, which were to occur a week after the national championship. At the national championships, they finished sixth in the short program. In the free skate they came third in the segment, moving up to fourth overall in the process, despite struggles on their jump and throw elements. Nagy said they were "a little bit frustrated that we were not able to show off our throws the way they've been in training." At the Four Continents Championships the following weekend, Liu/Nagy came third in the short program, winning a bronze small medal, despite Liu stumbling out of her jump. Liu said that they had "been working so hard on our throws and they've been so good since the New Year. I'm super happy that we were able to show that." They had a difficult free skate, and dropped to seventh.

On March 26, Liu announced she had ended her partnership with Nagy to prioritize her mental health.

=== Partnership with Ryan Bedard ===
==== 2025–26 season ====
In July 2025, it was announced that Liu had teamed up with fellow American pair skater, Ryan Bedard.

They made their debut as a pair team at the 2025 CS John Nicks International Pairs Competition, where they finished in sixth place. This was then followed up with a bronze medal win at the 2025 Tayside Trophy and seventh at the 2025 CS Golden Spin of Zagreb.

In January, Liu/Bedard competed at the 2026 U.S. Championships, where they finished in eighth place.

In June, the pair announced that they had made a coaching change from Jenni Meno, Brandon Frazier, Christine Fowler-Binder, and Chris Pottenger to Bruno Marcotte, Russ Scott, Chris Pottenger, and Anthony Evans.

==== 2026–27 season ====
Liu/Bedard opened their season with a 4th place finish at the 2026 Kinoshita Group Cup.

== Programs ==
=== With Bedard ===
Season	Short program	Free skating
2025–2026	"Angel of Small Death and the Codeine Scene" by Hozier choreo. by Yura Min, Brandon Frazier	"Two Men in Love" by The Irrepressibles choreo. by Yura Min, Brandon Frazier

=== With Nagy ===
Season	Short program	Free skating	Exhibition
2023–2024	"Dive" by Ed Sheeran choreo. by Adam Rippon, Christine Fowler-Binder	"A Thousand Times Good Night" (from Romeo & Juliet) by Abel Korzeniowski choreo. by Pasquale Camerlengo	"Peer Pressure" by James Bay & Julia Michaels

=== With O'Shea ===
Season	Short program	Free skating
2021–2022	"Lover" by Taylor Swift choreo. by Adam Rippon	"Becoming Human" (from Score: A Film Music Documentary) by Ryan Taubert choreo. by Sinead Kerr, John Kerr

=== With Meyh ===
Season	Short program	Free skating
2018–2019	"One and Only" by Adele	"Exogenesis: Symphony" (Part 3) by Muse

=== With Johnson ===
Season	Short program	Free skating
2017–2018	Still Got the Blues by Gary Moore	Act III: Adagio of Spartacus and Phrygia (from Spartacus) by Aram Khachaturian, Michail Jurowski
2016–2017	The Way You Make Me Feel; Black or White by Michael Jackson	Beauty and the Beast by Alan Menken choreo. by Renée Roca
2015–2016	"Tango de los Exilados" by Walter Taieb, Vanessa-Mae choreo. by Pasquale Camerlengo	Beauty and the Beast by Alan Menken choreo. by Renée Roca
2014–2015	Mary Poppins by the Sherman Brothers choreo. by Christine Binder	Yellow River Piano Concerto: Prelude performed by Lang Lang choreo. by Christine Binder

=== With Perini ===
Season	Short program	Free skating
2013–2014	42nd Street by Harry Warren performed by the Boston Pops Orchestra	"Bohemian Rhapsody" by Queen
2012–2013	"Dueling Banjos" by Eric Weissberg	Charlie Chaplin film music
2011–2012	"Boogie Woogie Bugle Boy" by The Andrews Sisters	Charlie Chaplin film music
2010–2011	"The Can Can" by Rugby World Cup Classic	"Oogway Ascends" (from Kung Fu Panda) by Hans Zimmer

== Competitive highlights ==
=== Pair skating with Ryan Bedard (for the United States) ===
Competition placements at senior level
Season	2025–26	2026–27
U.S. Championships	8th	
GP Cup of China		5th
GP NHK Trophy		TBD
CS Golden Spin of Zagreb	7th	
CS John Nicks Pairs	6th	
CS Kinoshita Group Cup		4th
CS Trialeti Trophy		7th
Tayside Trophy	3rd	
Ice Challenge	1st	

=== Pair skating with Balázs Nagy (for the United States) ===
Competition placements at senior level
Season	2023–24
Four Continents Championships	7th
U.S. Championships	4th
GP NHK Trophy	6th
GP Skate America	3rd
CS Autumn Classic	4th

=== Pair skating with Daniel O'Shea (for the United States) ===
Competition placements at senior level
Season	2021–22
GP Skate America	7th
CS Warsaw Cup	WD
Cranberry Cup	5th
John Nicks Pairs	4th

=== Pair skating with Xie Zhong (for China) ===
Competition placements at senior level
Season	2019–20
Chinese Championships	3rd

=== Pair skating with Ian Meyh (for the United States) ===
Competition placements at senior level
Season	2018–19
U.S. Championships	11th
Bavarian Open	1st
Golden Spin of Zagreb	3rd

=== Pair skating with Brian Johnson (for the United States) ===
Competition placements at senior level
Season	2016–17	2017–18
U.S. Championships	6th	7th
CS U.S. Classic		3rd
CS Warsaw Cup	2nd	6th

Competition placements at junior level
Season	2014–15	2015–16	2016–17
World Junior Championships	7th	5th	7th
Junior Grand Prix Final	6th		
U.S. Championships	2nd		
JGP Austria		8th	
JGP Croatia	4th		
JGP Czech Republic			3rd
JGP Estonia			5th
JGP Germany	3rd		
JGP Poland		5th	

=== Pair skating with Devin Perini (for the United States) ===
Competition placements at junior level
Season	2012–13	2013–14
U.S. Championships	4th	2nd
JGP Czech Republic		5th
JGP Slovakia		4th

== Detailed results ==
=== Pair skating with Ryan Bedard (for the United States) ===
ISU personal best scores in the +5/-5 GOE System
Segment	Type	Score	Event
Total	TSS	168.27	2025 CS John Nicks International Pairs Competition
Short program	TSS	59.88	2025 CS John Nicks International Pairs Competition
Short program	TES	34.68	2025 CS John Nicks International Pairs Competition
Short program	PCS	26.47	2025 CS Golden Spin of Zagreb
Free skating	TSS	108.39	2025 CS John Nicks International Pairs Competition
Free skating	TES	55.92	2025 CS John Nicks International Pairs Competition
Free skating	PCS	54.47	2025 CS John Nicks International Pairs Competition

Results in the 2025–26 season
Date	Event	SP		FS		Total	
Date	Event	P	Score	P	Score	P	Score
Sep 2–3, 2025	(United States) 2025 CS John Nicks International Pairs Competition	6	59.88	6	108.39	6	168.27
Oct 11–12, 2025	(United Kingdom) 2025 Tayside Trophy	2	68.29	4	111.58	3	179.87
Nov 5–9, 2025	(Austria) 2025 Ice Challenge	1	65.50	2	116.10	1	181.60
Dec 3–6, 2025	(Croatia) 2025 CS Golden Spin of Zagreb	8	57.79	7	106.09	7	163.88
Jan 4–11, 2026	(United States) 2026 U.S. Championships	7	62.34	7	113.22	8	175.56

Results in the 2026–27 season
Date	Event	SP		FS		Total	
Date	Event	P	Score	P	Score	P	Score
Sep 4–6, 2026	(Japan) 2026 CS Kinoshita Group Cup	5	58.88	4	106.82	4	165.70
Sep 30 – Oct 3, 2026	(Georgia (country)) 2026 CS Trialeti Trophy	7	50.49	7	92.50	7	142.99
Nov 6–8, 2026	2026 Cup of China	5	62.71	5	100.31	5	163.02

=== Pair skating with Balázs Nagy (for the United States) ===
ISU personal best scores in the +5/-5 GOE System
Segment	Type	Score	Event
Total	TSS	177.66	2023 Skate America
Short program	TSS	61.90	2024 Four Continents Championships
Short program	TES	33.92	2023 Skate America
Short program	PCS	29.19	2024 Four Continents Championships
Free skating	TSS	116.43	2023 Skate America
Free skating	TES	60.43	2023 Skate America
Free skating	PCS	58.55	2024 Four Continents Championships

2023–2024 season
Date	Event	SP	FS	Total
Jan. 30 – Feb. 4, 2024	2024 Four Continents Championships	3; 61.90	8; 113.95	7; 175.85
January 22–28, 2024	2024 U.S. Championships	6; 60.13	3; 118.70	4; 178.83
November 24–26, 2023	2023 NHK Trophy	5; 61.23	7; 111.37	6; 172.60
October 20–22, 2023	2023 Skate America	3; 61.23	3; 116.43	3; 177.66
September 14–17, 2023	2023 CS Autumn Classic International	4; 56.09	3; 109.22	4; 165.20

=== Pair skating with Daniel O'Shea ===
ISU personal best scores in the +5/-5 GOE System
Segment	Type	Score	Event
Total	TSS	175.40	2021 Skate America
Short program	TSS	62.55	2021 CS Warsaw Cup
Short program	TES	34.63	2021 CS Warsaw Cup
Short program	PCS	28.92	2021 Skate America
Free skating	TSS	115.24	2021 Skate America
Free skating	TES	57.13	2021 Skate America
Free skating	PCS	60.11	2021 Skate America

Results in the 2021–22 season
Date	Event	SP		FS		Total	
Date	Event	P	Score	P	Score	P	Score
Aug 13–15, 2021	(United States) 2021 Cranberry Cup International	6	56.31	5	108.89	5	165.20
Sep 9–10, 2021	(United States) 2021 John Nicks Pairs Challenge	3	66.67	5	110.78	4	177.45
Oct 22–24, 2021	(United States) 2021 Skate America	7	60.16	7	115.24	7	175.40
Nov 17–20, 2021	(Poland) 2021 CS Warsaw Cup	5	62.55	—N/a	—N/a	–	WD
