= 2024 CS John Nicks International Pairs Competition =

Figure skating competition in Norwood, Massachusetts

- Type: ISU Challenger Series
- Date: September 3 – 4
- Season: 2024–25
- Location: New York City, New York, United States
- Host: U.S. Figure Skating & Skating Club of New York
- Venue: Sky Rink at Chelsea Piers

Champions
- Pairs: (United States) Ellie Kam and Daniel O'Shea
- Next: 2025 CS John Nicks International Pairs Competition
- Previous CS: 2024 CS Cranberry Cup International
- Next CS: 2024 CS Lombardia Trophy

The 2024 CS John Nicks International Pairs Competition was held on September 3–4, 2024, in New York City, New York, in the United States. as part of the 2024–25 ISU Challenger Series. Medals were awarded in pair skating only.

== Entries ==
The International Skating Union published the list of entries on August 15, 2024.

Country	Pairs
Austria	Sophia Schaller; Livio Mayr
Canada	Kelly Ann Laurin; Loucas Éthier
Finland	Milania Väänänen; Filippo Clerici
Italy	Rebecca Ghilardi; Filippo Ambrosini
Japan	Yuna Nagaoka; Sumitada Moriguchi
Philippines	Isabella Gamez; Alexander Korovin
Sweden	Greta Crafoord; John Crafoord
United States	Nica Digerness; Mark Sadusky
United States	Alisa Efimova; Misha Mitrofanov
United States	Linzy Fitzpatrick; Keyton Bearinger
United States	Evelyn Grace Hanns; Danny Neudecker
United States	Ellie Kam; Daniel O'Shea
United States	Katie McBeath; Daniil Parkman
United States	Naomi Williams; Lachlan Lewer
Uzbekistan	Ekaterina Geynish; Dmitrii Chigirev

=== Changes to preliminary entries ===
Date	Discipline	Withdrew	Added	Ref.
August 26	Pairs	(United States); Isabelle Martins; Ryan Bedard	(United States); Linzy Fitzpatrick; Keyton Bearinger	
August 27	Pairs	(United States); Emily Chan; Spencer Akira Howe	—	
August 30	Pairs	(United States); Meghan Fredette; Danylo Siianytsia	—	

== Results ==
=== Pairs ===
Pairs' results
Rank	Team	Nation	Total points	SP		FS	
1st place, gold medalist(s)	Ellie Kam; Daniel O'Shea	United States	191.62	1	67.46	2	124.16
2nd place, silver medalist(s)	Alisa Efimova; Misha Mitrofanov	United States	188.88	4	63.44	1	125.44
3rd place, bronze medalist(s)	Ekaterina Geynish; Dmitrii Chigirev	Uzbekistan	176.96	2	64.62	5	112.34
4	Kelly Ann Laurin; Loucas Éthier	Canada	174.08	5	60.97	4	113.11
5	Katie McBeath; Daniil Parkman	United States	173.37	10	54.41	3	118.96
6	Rebecca Ghilardi; Filippo Ambrosini	Italy	172.61	3	64.61	7	108.00
7	Milania Väänänen; Filippo Clerici	Finland	165.48	7	56.64	6	108.84
8	Yuna Nagaoka; Sumitada Moriguchi	Japan	158.90	8	55.92	8	102.98
9	Isabella Gamez; Alexander Korovin	Philippines	157.04	6	57.28	9	99.76
10	Nica Digerness; Mark Sadusky	United States	147.72	11	51.36	10	96.36
11	Naomi Williams; Lachlan Lewer	United States	145.94	9	54.43	12	91.51
12	Greta Crafoord; John Crafoord	Sweden	142.32	12	47.47	11	94.85
13	Linzy Fitzpatrick; Keyton Bearinger	United States	134.86	13	45.75	13	89.11
14	Evelyn Grace Hanns; Danny Neudecker	United States	128.78	15	41.11	14	87.67
15	Sophia Schaller; Livio Mayr	Austria	124.17	14	42.27	15	81.90
