= Balázs Nagy =

Hungarian-American pair skater

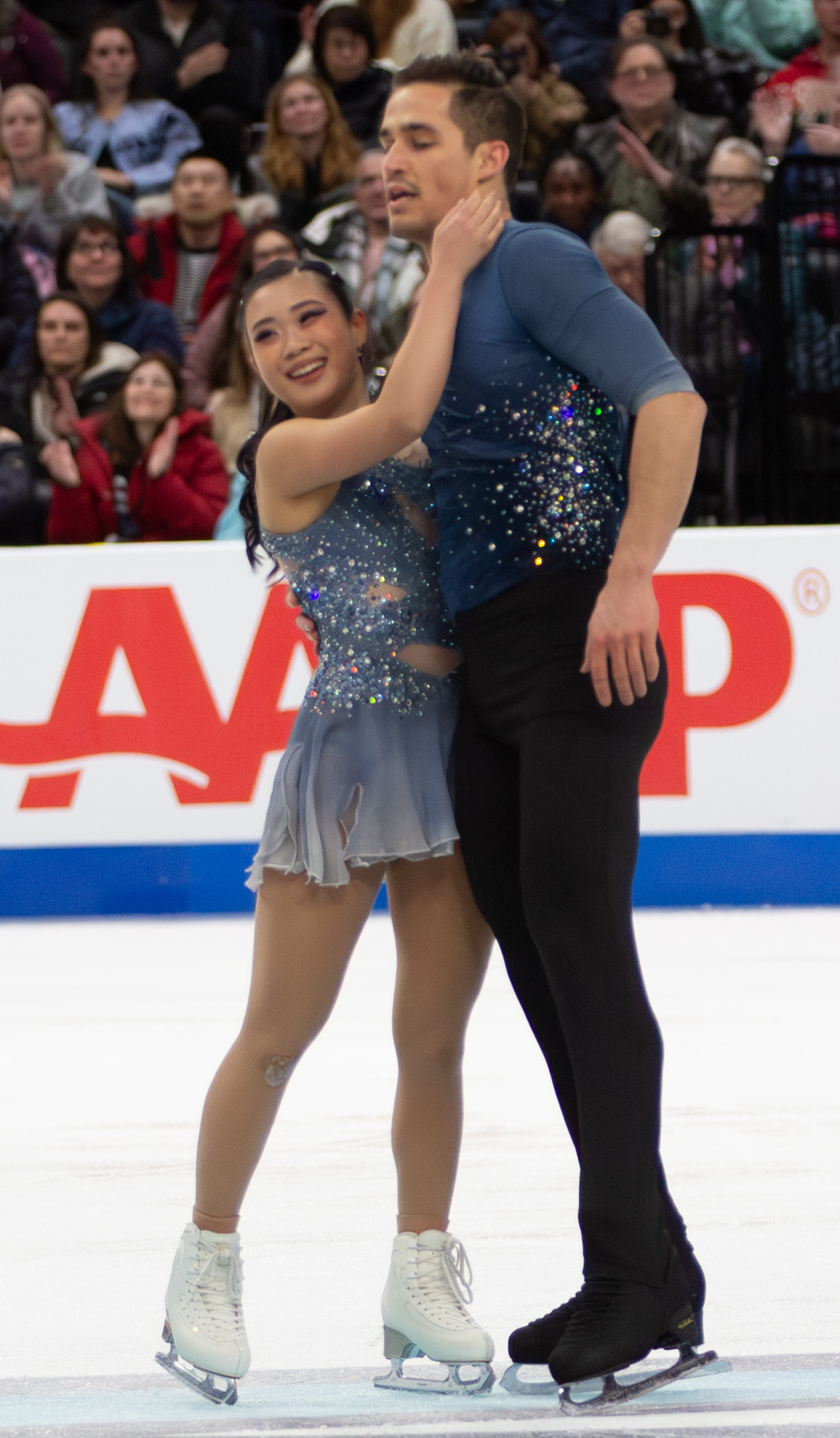
- Audrey Shin and Balázs Nagy at the 2026 U.S. Championships

Personal information
- Born: July 9, 1998 (age 28) Budapest, Hungary
- Height: 5 ft 10 in (1.77 m)

Figure skating career
- Country: United States (2018–20, since 2023); Hungary (2013–15, 2021–22)
- Discipline: Pair skating (since 2018); Men's singles (2013–15)
- Partner: Katie McBeath (since 2026); Audrey Shin (2024–26); Chelsea Liu (2023–24); Maria Pavlova (2021–22); Kate Finster (2018–20)
- Coach: Jenni Meno; Todd Sand; Brandon Frazier; Christine Binder
- Skating club: The Skating Club of New York

Medal record
Representing Hungary
Hungarian Championships
Silver medal – second place	2022 Spišská Nová Ves	Pairs

Balázs Nagy (born July 9, 1998) is a Hungarian-American pair skater. With his current partner, Katie McBeath, he is the 2026 Skate America bronze medalist. He is also the 2023 Skate America bronze medalist and 2024 U.S. national pewter medalist with former partner Chelsea Liu.

Earlier in his career, Nagy competed for Hungary with Maria Pavlova and won the 2020 U.S. national junior title with Kate Finster.

== Personal life ==
Nagy was born on July 9, 1998, in Budapest, Hungary to parents, Miklós Nagy and Ildikó Horváth. He also has three sisters named Mariann, Csilla, and Zsófi. The family first emigrated to the United States when Nagy was two years old. He moved back to Budapest for several years during his childhood, before returning to the U.S. to finish high school. Nagy became a U.S. citizen at the age of ten and currently holds dual citizenship between Hungary and the United States. Additionally, he is fluent in both Hungarian and English. Nagy went on to study exercise science at the University of Colorado Colorado Springs from 2019 to 2023.

== Career ==
=== Early career ===
Nagy began skating at the age of six. He was first coached by Oleg Efimov and Natalia Efimova, a former Soviet pairs skater and ice dancer, respectively, in Wake Forest, North Carolina. During this time, he also trained as a gymnast at Apex Gymnastics under coaches Todd McLoughlin and Jeremy Waters. He trained primarily in singles skating, representing first the United States, and then Hungary internationally after his family moved back to Budapest. At the suggestion of his coaches, Nagy briefly tried pairs with Krystal Edwards during the 2011–12 season, but the team split due him being "not ready" and his family returning to Hungary.

Nagy briefly quit skating in 2017, before deciding to return and switch to pairs full-time. He tried out with Kate Finster in the fall of 2017, around Thanksgiving, and they officially teamed up in early 2018. The pair relocated from training with her coaches, Jessica Miller and Stephanie Miller, in Northern Kentucky to work full-time with Dalilah Sappenfield and Larry Ibarra in Colorado Springs.

=== Pair skating with Kate Finster ===
==== 2018–2019 season: Debut of Finster/Nagy ====
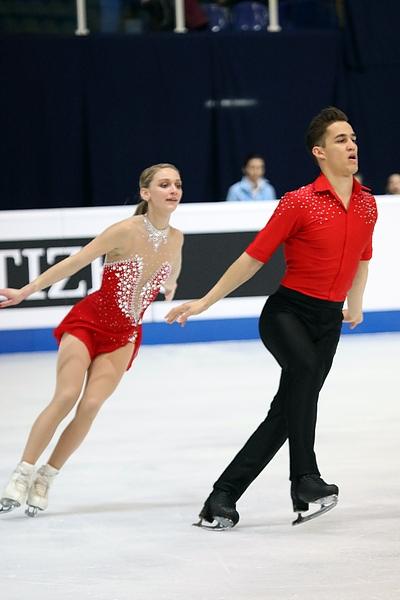
Finster and Nagy at the 2019 World Junior Championships

In their first season as a team, Finster/Nagy were assigned to 2018 JGP Czech Republic, where they finished ninth. They then won silver at Midwestern Sectionals. At the 2019 U.S. Championships, Finster/Nagy won the junior silver medal behind Lockley/Prochnow. As a result, they were named to the 2019 World Junior Championships team. At Junior Worlds, they were tenth after the short program and thirteenth in the free skating, to finish eleventh overall. Nagy called the experience "humbling" and motivation for the next season.

==== 2019–2020 season: U.S. Junior national title ====
Finster/Nagy opened the season with a sixth-place finish at 2019 JGP United States. They then won their first international medal at 2019 JGP Poland, earning the silver medal, behind Panfilova/Rylov of Russia and ahead of Germany's Hocke/Kunkel. Their results qualified them as first alternates to the 2019–20 Junior Grand Prix Final.

Finster/Nagy won the inaugural U.S. Pairs Final to qualify to the 2020 U.S. Championships. They won their first junior pairs title at the 2020 U.S. Championships, ahead of Smirnova/Siianytsia and Deardorff/Johnson. Their result earned them a berth on the 2020 World Junior Championships team. They finished sixth.

==== 2020–2021 season ====
Finster/Nagy placed ninth at the ISP Points Challenge. In December, Nagy announced that the pair had split.

=== Pair skating with Maria Pavlova ===
==== 2021–2022 season ====
Nagy formed a new partnership with Russian skater Maria Pavlova to represent his native Hungary. Making their debut at the Budapest Trophy, where they were seventh, they then competed twice on the Challenger series, finishing fifth at the 2021 Denis Ten Memorial Challenge and thirteenth at the 2021 CS Golden Spin of Zagreb.

After winning the silver medal at the 2022 Four National Championships and the Hungarian Championships, Pavlova/Nagy made their debut at the European Championships, finishing eleventh.

The pair parted ways following the season. Nagy would later explain that "I fell out of love with the sport, so I stepped away for a little bit. I had surgery again–my other shoulder. While I was recovering from that one, that was when I reached out to U.S. Figure Skating."

=== Pair skating with Chelsea Liu ===
==== 2023–2024 season: Grand Prix bronze ====
In April 2023, Nagy tried out with Chelsea Liu. They announced their partnership in May.

Liu/Nagy made their domestic debut by winning the Glacier Falls Summer Classic, before being sent to make their international debut on the Challenger debut at the 2023 CS Autumn Classic International. They attracted notice for their innovative climactic lift in the free skate, but finished fourth. They were subsequently invited to make their Grand Prix debut at the 2023 Skate America, finishing third in the short program with a new personal best score (61.23). They were third in the free skate as well, despite Liu making two Salchow errors, winning the bronze medal. Liu said that "winning a medal on the Grand Prix is great, but what feels even better is that we put out a great program." Liu/Nagy went on to place sixth at the 2023 NHK Trophy.

In advance of the 2024 U.S. Championships, Liu/Nagy were preemptively assigned to the American team for the 2024 Four Continents Championships in Shanghai, which were to occur a week after the national championship. At the national championships, they finished sixth in the short program. In the free skate they came third in the segment, moving up to fourth overall in the process, despite struggles on their jump and throw elements. Nagy said they were "a little bit frustrated that we were not able to show off our throws the way they've been in training." At the Four Continents Championships the following weekend, Liu/Nagy came third in the short program, winning a bronze small medal, despite Liu stumbling out of her jump. Liu said that they had "been working so hard on our throws and they've been so good since the New Year. I'm super happy that we were able to show that." They had a difficult free skate, and dropped to seventh.

On March 26, Liu announced she had ended her partnership with Nagy to prioritize her mental health.

=== Pair skating with Audrey Shin ===
==== 2024–2025 season ====
Following the end of his partnership with Liu, Nagy learned that American singles skater, Audrey Shin, was interested in pursuing pair skating. He then contacted her and asked if she would be interested in having a tryout with him to which she agreed. After a week of skating together, the pair agreed to form a partnership. They announced that they would primarily train in Oakville, Ontario, Canada under coaches, Bruno Marcotte and Andrew Evans, while also making trips to Colorado to work with Tammy Gambill.

The pair began their season in December, winning the bronze medal at the 2024 CS Golden Spin of Zagreb.

The following month, Shin/Nagy competed at the 2025 U.S. Championships, placing fifth in the short program and third in the free skate, finishing fifth overall. While at the event, Shin spoke of her experience competing as a pair skater at Nationals for the first time, sharing, "It felt less stressful, and it’s nice having someone else out there on the ice with me, so it’s actually more fun than stressful." "We have been training fairly well, and I definitely feel confident in our training," said Nagy. "But nationals are nationals. There’s always more pressure, more everything. We haven’t had the best practices here this week, but I think we, well, I think she maximized everything.”

Selected to compete at the 2025 Four Continents Championships in Seoul, South Korea, Shin/Nagy finished the season by finishing the event in eleventh place.

==== 2025–2026 season ====
Shin/Nagy opened the season with a seventh-place finish at the 2025 CS John Nicks International Pairs Competition. They then went on to compete at the 2025 Skate to Milano, the final qualifying event for the 2026 Winter Olympics, where they finished in sixth place.

Making their Grand Prix debut at the 2025 Grand Prix de France, Shin/Nagy placed fifth at the event overall. They subsequently won silver at the 2025 Ice Challenge and gold at the 2025 CS Golden Spin of Zagreb.

In January, they competed at the 2026 U.S. Championships, finishing in fifth place. "Overall, this competition, we had a really strong short and that’s something we’re super proud of," Shin said. "And, coming into the long, we felt a little bit more nervous, I think, but we still tried our best no matter what and tried to finish strong." They were subsequently named as the first alternates for the 2026 Winter Olympic team and to the 2026 Four Continents team.

On March 26, Shin announced the end of their partnership, citing mental and emotional health reasons. Nagy subsequently paired up with Katie McBeath, his fifth competitive partner in six years.

=== Partnership with McBeath ===
==== 2026–27 season: First Grand Prix medal ====
McBeath and Nagy made their debut at the 2026 John Nicks Pairs Challenge, finishing third behind winners Aleksandra Boikova and Dmitrii Kozlovskii and runners-up Audrey Shin, Nagy's former partner, and her new partner, Spencer Howe.

McBeath and Nagy then made their ISU Grand Prix debut by finishing third at the 2026 Skate America, where Shin and Howe finished sixth. “Katie and I are both very proud of our skate,” said Nagy after the free skate. “We’ve been training very hard. It feels good to have kind of the work we’ve been doing at home validated with the result.”

The following week, McBeath and Nagy competed at the 2026 Finlandia Trophy, where they finished fourth. “It’s been a long two weeks, and we’re glad to be done,” said Nagy. “We’ve had two good competitions in a row. We knew today would be hard, and it was.”

== Programs ==
=== With McBeath ===
Season	Short program	Free skating	Exhibition
2026–2027	Carmen; by Bizet	Experience; by Ludovico Einadu	

=== Pair skating with Audrey Shin ===
Season	Short program	Free skating	Exhibition
2024–2025	"Lacrimosa (Techno Mix)" by Wolfgang Amadeus Mozart performed by Rudolf-Christian Tvardochlib-Iascinschi; "Prelude (Age Of Heroes)" by Balázs Havasi choreo. by Julie Marcotte	"River Flows In You"; "River Flows In You (Orchestra Version)" by Yiruma choreo. by Drew Meekins	
2025–2026	The Godfather; Speak Softly Love by Nino Rota; Speak Softly Love performed by Yao Si Ting; The Godfather Suite by Drew Tretrick choreo. by John Kerr; El Tango de Roxanne (from Moulin Rouge!) performed by Ewan McGregor & José Feliciano choreo. by Tessa Virtue	Two Men in Love by The Irrepressibles choreo. by Silvia Fontana, John Zimmerman	

=== Pair skating with Chelsea Liu ===
Season	Short program	Free skating	Exhibition
2023–2024	"Dive" by Ed Sheeran choreo. by Adam Rippon, Christine Fowler-Binder	"A Thousand Times Good Night" (from Romeo & Juliet) by Abel Korzeniowski choreo. by Pasquale Camerlengo	"Peer Pressure" by James Bay & Julia Michaels

=== Pair skating with Maria Pavlova ===
Season	Short program	Free skating
2021–2022	"Big Spender" (from Sweet Charity) by Cy Coleman and Dorothy Fields choreo. by Andrei Filonov	The Mask of Zorro by James Horner choreo. by Andrei Filonov

=== Pair skating with Kate Finster ===
Season	Short program	Free skating
2018–2019	"Harlem Nocturne" performed by Fausto Papeth	"Hollywood Wiz" (from Paramour by Cirque du Soleil)
2019–2020	"Hallelujah" performed by Jeff Buckley choreo. by Delilah Sappenfield	"To Build a Home" by The Cinematic Orchestra; "Rain, In Your Black Eyes" by Ezio Bosso choreo. by Delilah Sappenfield
2020–2021	"Lost Without You" by Freya Ridings choreo. by Benoit Richaud	"O (Fly On)"; "Fix You" by Coldplay choreo. by Benoit Richaud

== Competitive highlights ==
- GP – Event of the ISU Grand Prix Series
- JGP – Event of the ISU Junior Grand Prix Series
- CS – Event of the ISU Challenger Series
- TBD – Assigned
- WD – Withdrew from competition

=== Pair skating with Katie McBeath (for the United States) ===
Competition placements at senior level
Season	2026–27
GP Finland	4th
GP Skate America	3rd
CS John Nicks	3rd
CS Trialeti Trophy	5th

=== Pair skating with Audrey Shin (for the United States) ===
Competition placements at senior level
Season	2024–25	2025–26
Four Continents Championships	11th	7th
U.S. Championships	5th	5th
GP France		5th
CS Golden Spin of Zagreb	3rd	1st
CS John Nicks Pairs		7th
Ice Challenge		2nd
Skate to Milano		6th

=== Pair skating with Chelsea Liu (for the United States) ===
Competition placements at senior level
Season	2023–24
Four Continents Championships	7th
U.S. Championships	4th
GP NHK Trophy	6th
GP Skate America	3rd
CS Autumn Classic	4th

=== Pair skating with Maria Pavlova (for Hungary) ===
Competition placements at senior level
Season	2021–22
European Championships	11th
Hungarian Championships	2nd
CS Golden Spin of Zagreb	13th
Budapest Trophy	7th
Denis Ten Memorial	5th

=== Pair skating with Kate Finster (for the United States) ===
International: Junior
Event	18–19	19–20
Junior Worlds	11th	6th
JGP Czech Republic	9th	
JGP Poland		2nd
JGP United States		6th
National
U.S. Championships	2nd J	1st J

=== Singles skating (for Hungary) ===
International: Junior
Event	14–15
Ice Challenge	9th
Santa Claus Cup	15th
National
Hungarian Jun. Champ.	4th J

== Detailed results ==
=== Pair skating with Katie McBeath (for the United States) ===
ISU personal best scores in the +5/-5 GOE System
Segment	Type	Score	Event
Total	**TSS**	**191.25**	2026 Finlandia Trophy
Short program	**TSS**	**70.81**	2026 Finlandia Trophy
Short program	TES	40.79	2026 Finlandia Trophy
Short program	PCS	30.02	2026 Finlandia Trophy
Free skating	**TSS**	**120.44**	2026 Finlandia Trophy
Free skating	TES	58.76	2026 Skate America
Free skating	PCS	62.30	2026 Finlandia Trophy

Results in the 2026–27 season
Date	Event	SP		FS		Total	
Date	Event	P	Score	P	Score	P	Score
Sep 11–12, 2026	(United States) 2026 CS John Nicks Pairs Challenge	4	67.17	3	113.78	3	180.95
Sep 30 – Oct 3, 2026	(Georgia (country)) 2026 CS Trialeti Trophy	5	55.39	5	103.95	5	159.34
Nov 13–15, 2026	(United States) 2026 Skate America	5	67.62	3	119.51	3	187.13
Nov 20–21, 2026	(Finland) 2026 Finlandia Trophy	3	70.81	4	120.44	4	191.25

=== Pair skating with Audrey Shin (for the United States) ===
ISU personal best scores in the +5/-5 GOE System
Segment	Type	Score	Event
Total	**TSS**	**194.00**	2025 CS Golden Spin of Zagreb
Short program	**TSS**	**66.03**	2025 CS Golden Spin of Zagreb
Short program	TES	36.17	2025 CS Golden Spin of Zagreb
Short program	PCS	29.86	2025 CS Golden Spin of Zagreb
Free skating	**TSS**	**127.97**	2025 CS Golden Spin of Zagreb
Free skating	TES	65.36	2025 CS Golden Spin of Zagreb
Free skating	PCS	62.61	2025 CS Golden Spin of Zagreb

Results in the 2024–25 season
Date	Event	SP		FS		Total	
Date	Event	P	Score	P	Score	P	Score
Dec 5–7, 2024	(Croatia) 2024 CS Golden Spin of Zagreb	3	58.22	3	111.99	3	170.21
Jan 20–26, 2025	(United States) 2025 U.S. Championships	5	62.06	3	120.61	5	182.67
Feb 19–23, 2025	(South Korea) 2025 Four Continents Championships	10	51.70	11	76.66	11	128.36

Results in the 2025–26 season
Date	Event	SP		FS		Total	
Date	Event	P	Score	P	Score	P	Score
Sep 2–3, 2025	(United States) 2025 CS John Nicks International Pairs Competition	7	59.64	7	106.12	7	165.76
Sep 18–21, 2025	(China) 2025 ISU Skate to Milano	7	53.99	6	104.67	6	158.66
Oct 17–19, 2025	2025 Grand Prix de France	5	61.79	5	111.51	5	173.30
Nov 5–9, 2025	(Austria) 2025 Ice Challenge	2	62.07	1	117.18	2	179.25
Dec 3–6, 2025	(Croatia) 2025 CS Golden Spin of Zagreb	1	66.03	1	127.97	1	194.00
Jan 4–11, 2026	(United States) 2026 U.S. Championships	2	67.67	5	117.43	5	185.10
Jan 21–25, 2026	(China) 2026 Four Continents Championships	6	63.11	7	113.29	7	176.40

=== Pair skating with Chelsea Liu (for the United States) ===
ISU personal best scores in the +5/-5 GOE System
Segment	Type	Score	Event
Total	**TSS**	**177.66**	2023 Skate America
Short program	**TSS**	**61.90**	2024 Four Continents Championships
Short program	TES	33.92	2023 Skate America
Short program	PCS	29.19	2024 Four Continents Championships
Free skating	**TSS**	**116.43**	2023 Skate America
Free skating	TES	60.43	2023 Skate America
Free skating	PCS	58.55	2024 Four Continents Championships

Current personal best scores are highlighted in bold.

**2023–2024 season**
Date	Event	SP	FS	Total
Jan 30 – Feb 4, 2024	2024 Four Continents Championships	3; **61.90**	8; 113.95	7; 175.85
January 22–28, 2024	2024 U.S. Championships	6; 60.13	3; 118.70	4; 178.83
November 24–26, 2023	2023 NHK Trophy	5; 61.23	7; 111.37	6; 172.60
October 20–22, 2023	2023 Skate America	3; 61.23	3; **116.43**	3; **177.66**
September 14–17, 2023	2023 CS Autumn Classic International	4; 56.09	3; 109.22	4; 165.20

=== Pair skating with Maria Pavlova (for Hungary) ===
Current personal best scores are highlighted in bold.

**2021–2022 season**
Date	Event	SP	FS	Total
January 10–16, 2022	2022 European Championships	11; **56.24**	11; **105.08**	11; **161.32**
December 16–18, 2021	2022 Four National Championships	2; 55.34	2; 101.59	2; 156.93
December 7–11, 2021	2021 CS Golden Spin of Zagreb	11; 55.61	14; 95.92	13; 151.53
October 28–31, 2021	2021 Denis Ten Memorial Challenge	6; 56.96	5; 107.21	5; 164.17
October 14–17, 2021	2021 Budapest Trophy	6; 51.37	7; 88.01	7; 139.38

=== Pair skating with Kate Finster (for the United States) ===
Current personal best scores are highlighted in bold.

==== Junior results ====
**2019–20 season**
Date	Event	SP	FS	Total
March 2–8, 2020	2020 World Junior Championships	5; 58.33	7; 97.93	6; 156.26
January 20–26, 2020	2020 U.S. Championships	1; 63.89	2; 105.48	1; 169.37
September 18–21, 2019	2019 JGP Poland	2; **60.91**	2; **105.31**	2; **166.22**
August 28–31, 2019	2019 JGP United States	5; 54.33	9; 78.76	6; 133.09
**2018–19 season**
March 4–10, 2019	2019 World Junior Championships	10; 50.30	13; 81.99	11; 132.29
January 18–27, 2019	2019 U.S. Championships	2; 59.65	2; 89.83	2; 149.48
September 26–29, 2019	2019 JGP Czech Republic	7; 50.29	9; 78.02	9; 128.31
