= 2025 CS John Nicks International Pairs Competition =

Figure skating competition in Norwood, Massachusetts

- Type: ISU Challenger Series
- Date: September 2 – 3
- Season: 2025–26
- Location: New York City, New York, United States
- Host: U.S. Figure Skating
- Venue: Skating Club of New York

Champions
- Pairs: (Canada) Deanna Stellato-Dudek and Maxime Deschamps
- Previous: 2024 CS John Nicks International Pairs Competition
- Next: 2026 CS John Nicks International Pairs Competition
- Previous CS: 2025 CS Cranberry Cup International
- Next CS: 2025 CS Kinoshita Group Cup

The 2025 John Nicks International Pairs Competition was a figure skating competition sanctioned by the International Skating Union (ISU), organized and hosted by U.S. Figure Skating, and the second event of the 2025–26 ISU Challenger Series. It was held at the Skating Club of New York in New York City, New York, in the United States, from September 2 to 3, 2025. Medals were awarded in pair skating only, and skaters earned ISU World Standing points based on their results. Deanna Stellato-Dudek and Maxime Deschamps of Canada won the event, while Alisa Efimova and Misha Mitrofanov of the United States finished in second place, and Katie McBeath and Daniil Parkman of the United States finished in third. With the assist of Deschamps, Stellato-Dudek became the first woman to perform a backflip since the maneuver was legalized in 2024.

== Background ==
The inaugural John Nicks Pairs Challenge was held in 2021 at the Sky Rink at Chelsea Piers in New York City, New York, in the United States. The competition is named in honor of John Nicks, a retired British figure skater who worked as a figure skating coach in the United States for nearly four decades. The 2025 John Nicks International Pairs Competition was held from September 2 to 3.

The ISU Challenger Series was introduced in 2014. It is a series of international figure skating competitions sanctioned by the International Skating Union (ISU) and organized by ISU member nations. The objective was to ensure consistent organization and structure within a series of international competitions linked together, providing opportunities for senior-level skaters to compete at the international level and also earn ISU World Standing points. The 2025–26 Challenger Series consisted of eleven events, of which the John Nicks International Pairs Competition was the second. The Cranberry Cup International was held in conjunction with the John Nicks Pairs Challenge – the former hosted the men's and women's events, while the latter hosted the pairs event – and the two competitions constituted U.S. Figure Skating's contribution to the Challenger Series.

== Changes to preliminary assignments ==
The International Skating Union published the preliminary list of entrants on August 5, 2025. Ellie Kam and Daniel O'Shea withdrew from the competition on August 18.

== Required performance elements ==
Couples competing in pair skating first performed a short program on September 2. Lasting no more than 2 minutes 40 seconds, the short program had to include the following elements: one pair lift, one double or triple twist lift, one double or triple throw jump, one double or triple solo jump, one solo spin combination with a change of foot, one death spiral, and a step sequence using the full ice surface.

Skaters performed their free skates on September 3. The free skate could last no more than 4 minutes, and had to include the following: three pair lifts, of which one had to be a twist lift; two different throw jumps; one solo jump; one jump combination or sequence; one pair spin combination; one death spiral; and a choreographic sequence.

== Judging ==
Skaters were judged according to the required technical elements of their program (such as jumps and spins), as well as the overall presentation of their program, based on three program components (skating skills, presentation, and composition). Each technical element in a figure skating performance was assigned a predetermined base point value and scored by a panel of nine judges on a scale from −5 to +5 based on the quality of its execution. Each Grade of Execution (GOE) from –5 to +5 was assigned a value as indicated on the Scale of Values. For example, a triple Axel was worth a base value of 8.00 points, and a GOE of +3 was worth 2.40 points, so a triple Axel with a GOE of +3 earned 10.40 points. The judging panel's GOE for each element was determined by calculating the trimmed mean (the average after discarding the highest and lowest scores). The panel's scores for all elements were added together to generate a Total Elements Score. At the same time, the judges evaluated each performance based on the five aforementioned program components and assigned each a score from 0.25 to 10 in 0.25-point increments. The judging panel's final score for each program component was also determined by calculating the trimmed mean. Those scores were then multiplied by the factor shown on the chart below; the results were added together to generate a total Program Component Score.

Program component factoring
Discipline	Short program	Free skate
Pairs	1.33	2.67

Deductions were applied for certain violations, such as time infractions, stops and restarts, or falls. The Total Elements Score and Program Component Score were then added together, minus any deductions, to generate a final performance score for each skater or team.

== Medal summary ==
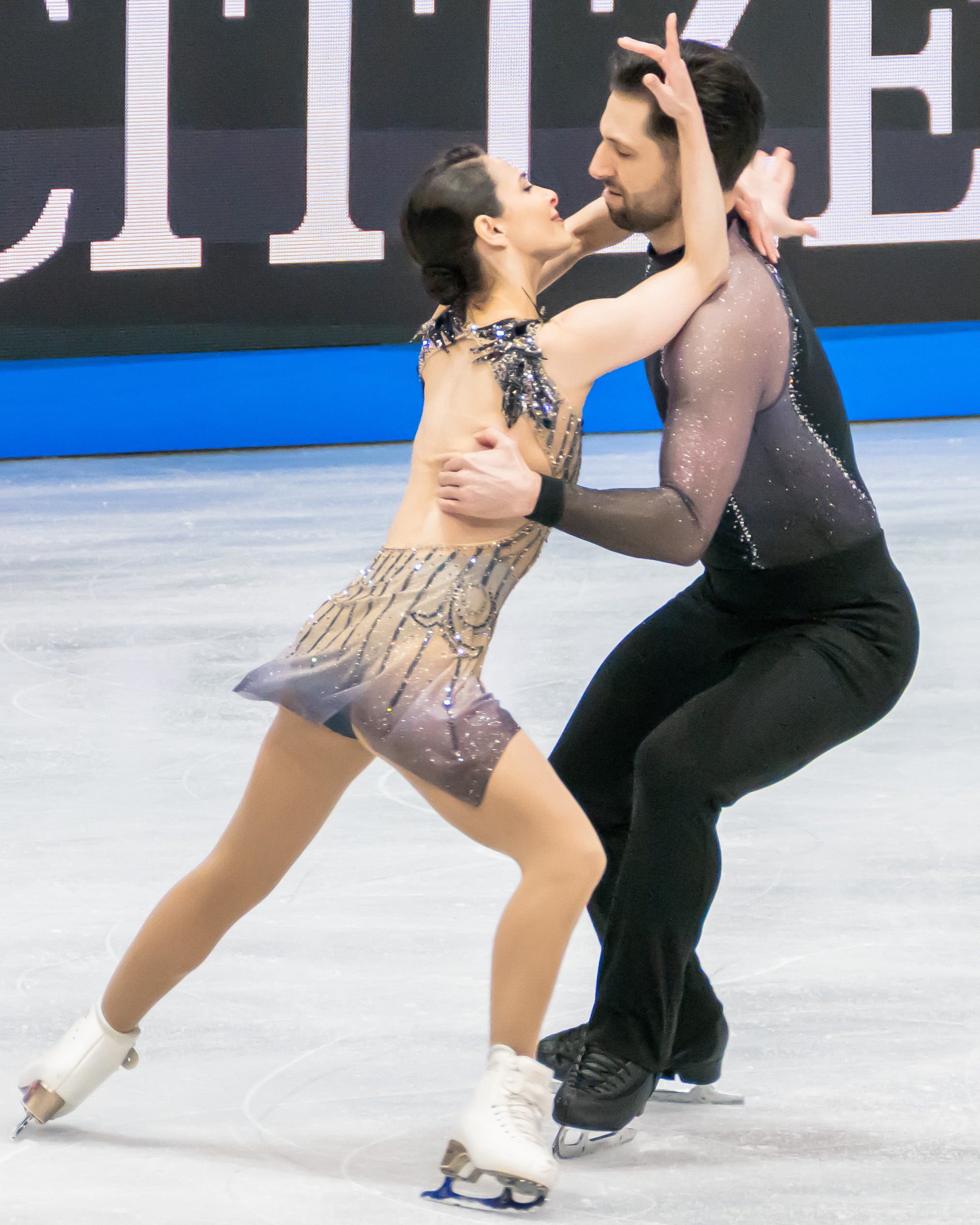
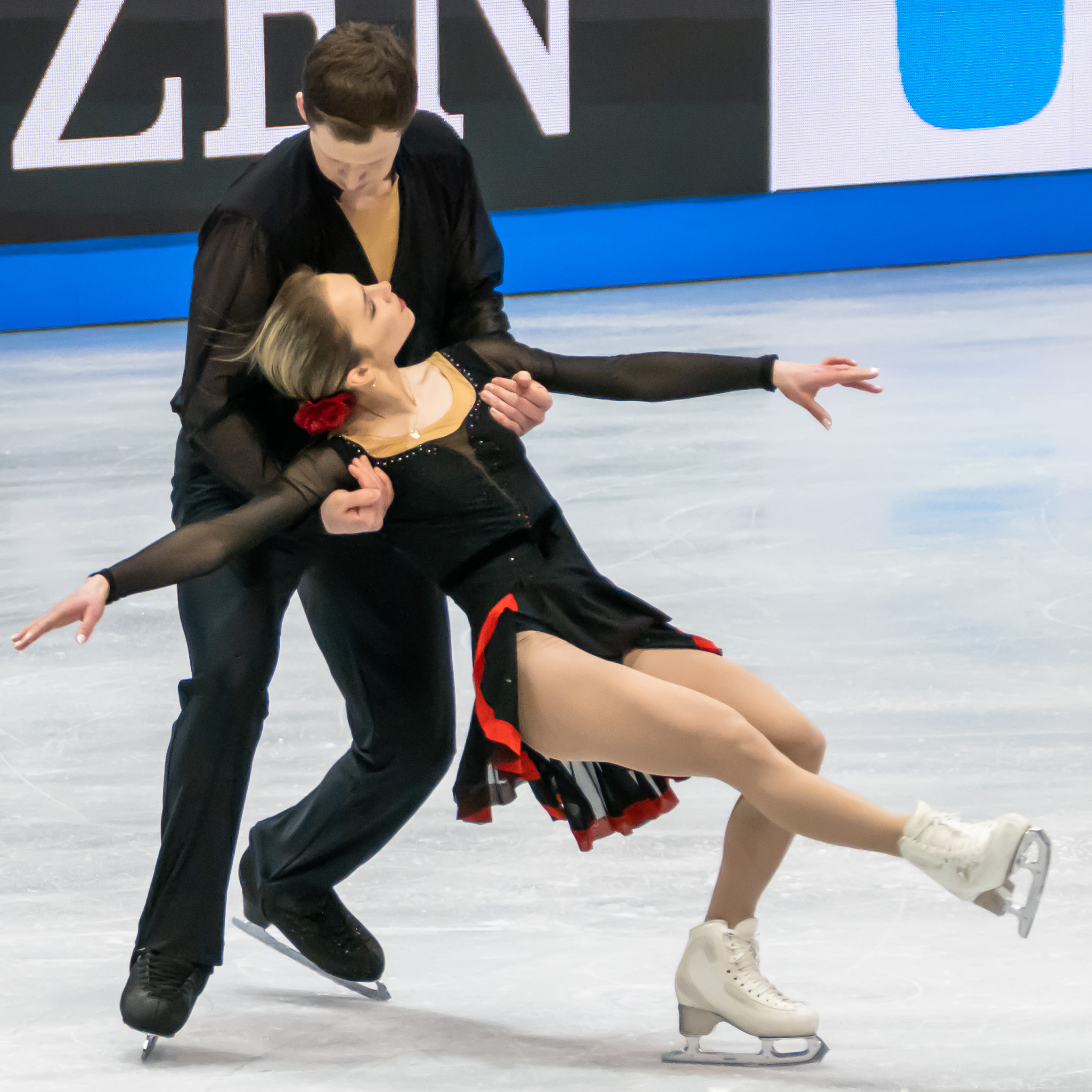
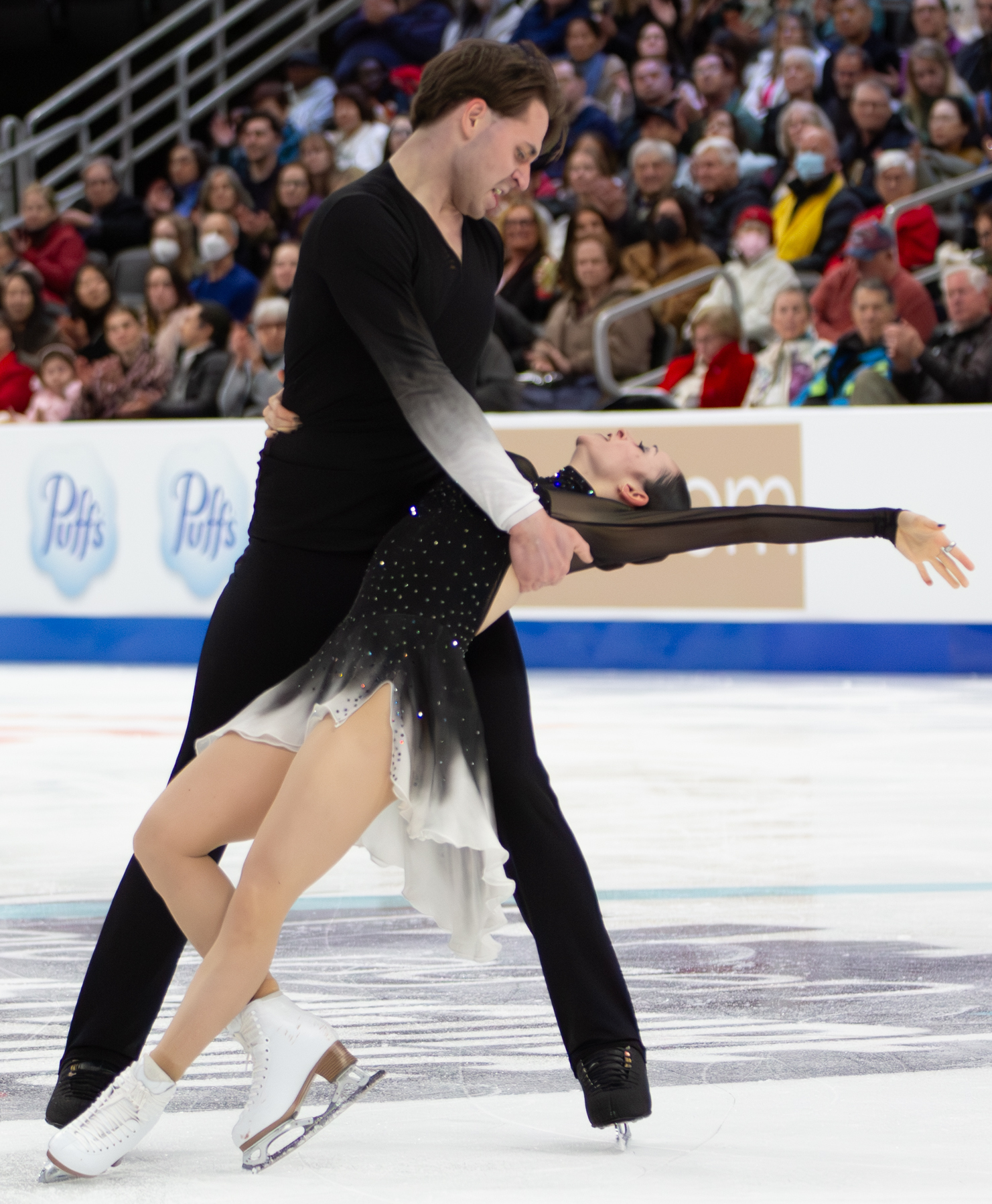
From left to right: The 2025 John Nicks International Pairs Competition medalists: Deanna Stellato-Dudek and Maxime Deschamps of Canada (gold); Alisa Efimova and Misha Mitrofanov of the United States (silver); and Katie McBeath and Daniil Parkman of the United States (bronze)

Medalists
Discipline	Gold	Silver	Bronze
Pairs	(Canada); Deanna Stellato-Dudek; Maxime Deschamps	(United States); Alisa Efimova; Misha Mitrofanov	(United States); Katie McBeath; Daniil Parkman

== Results ==
Deanna Stellato-Dudek and Maxime Deschamps of Canada dominated the competition, winning both the short program and free skate to ultimately win the gold medal, while Alisa Efimova and Misha Mitrofanov of the United States finished in second place, and Katie McBeath and Daniil Parkman, also of the United States, finished in third. During the short program, Stellato-Dudek performed a backflip with an assist from Deschamps. Stellato-Dudek, who cited Surya Bonaly of France as an inspiration, became the first woman to perform the backflip since it became a legal element in figure skating in 2024. Bonaly was the first skater to perform a backflip – in her case, solo – since it was declared an illegal maneuver in 1977. Knowing she was not going to win a medal, Bonaly chose to execute a backflip, landing on one skate, in lieu of two triple jumps at the end of her free skate during the 1998 Winter Olympics, knowing she would receive a point deduction.

Pairs results
Rank	Team	Nation	Total points	SP		FS	
1st place, gold medalist(s)	Deanna Stellato-Dudek; Maxime Deschamps	Canada	199.43	1	70.66	1	128.66
2nd place, silver medalist(s)	Alisa Efimova; Misha Mitrofanov	United States	193.54	2	66.85	2	126.69
3rd place, bronze medalist(s)	Katie McBeath; Daniil Parkman	United States	187.89	3	65.62	3	122.27
4	Emily Chan; Spencer Akira Howe	United States	183.22	4	65.58	4	117.64
5	Karina Akopova; Nikita Rakhmanin	Armenia	174.84	5	65.20	5	109.64
6	Chelsea Liu; Ryan Bedard	United States	168.27	6	59.88	6	108.39
7	Audrey Shin; Balazs Nagy	United States	165.76	7	59.64	7	106.12
8	Gabriella Izzo; Luc Maierhofer	Austria	165.00	8	59.59	8	105.41
9	Sophia Schaller; Livio Mayr	Austria	153.37	9	53.59	9	99.78
10	Naomi Williams; Lachlan Lewer	United States	148.14	10	53.22	10	94.92
11	Linzy Fitzpatrick; Keyton Bearinger	United States	125.91	12	43.17	11	82.74
12	Olivia Flores; Luke Wang	United States	122.66	11	45.01	12	77.65

== Works cited ==
- "Special Regulations & Technical Rules – Single & Pair Skating and Ice Dance 2024" (PDF). International Skating Union. Archived (PDF) from the original on June 3, 2025.
