= Daniil Parkman =

Russian-Georgian pair skater (born 1999)

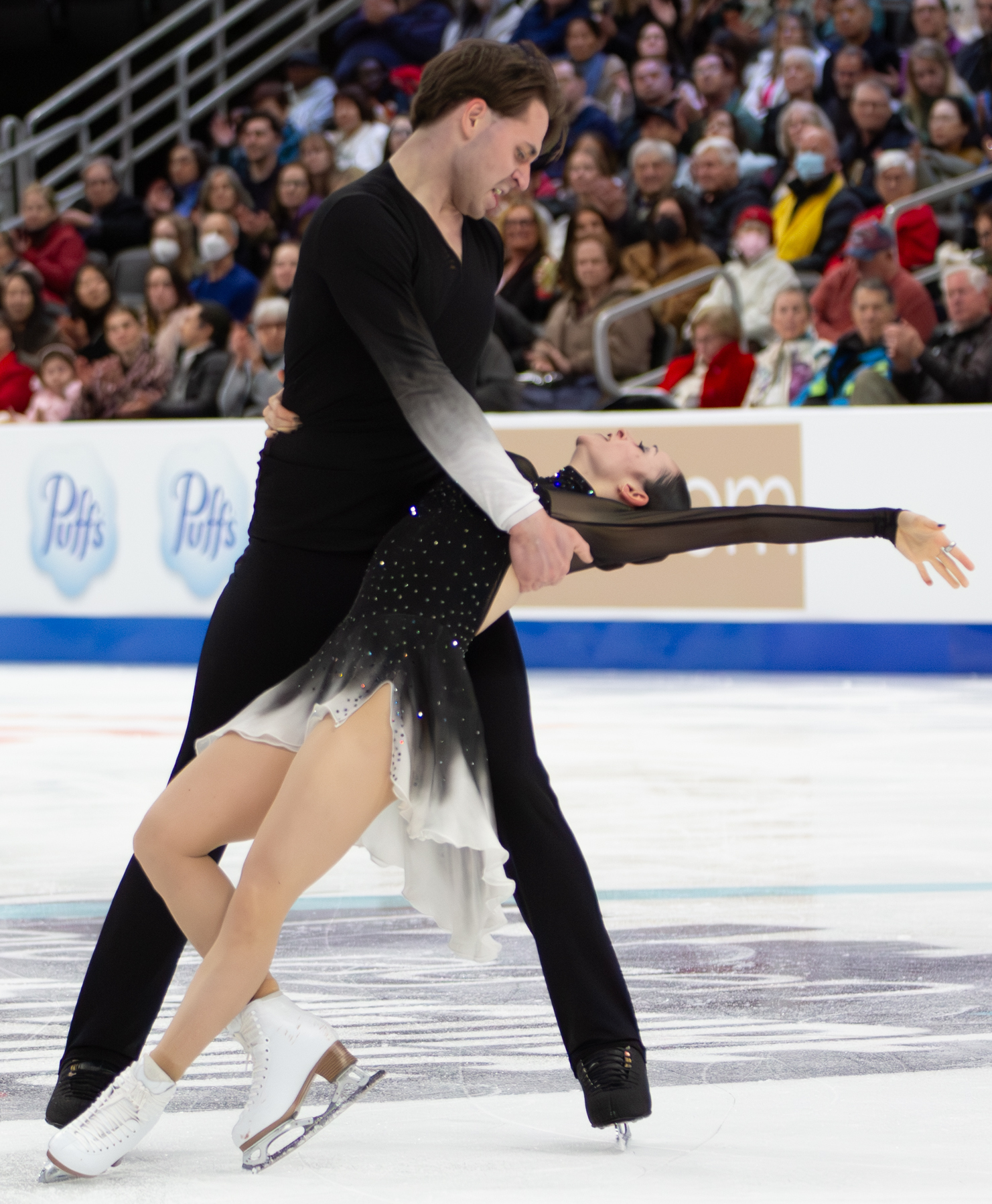
- Katie McBeath and Daniil Parkman at the 2026 U.S. Championships

Personal information
- Native name: Даниил Владимирович Паркман (Russian)
- Full name: Daniil Vladimirovich Parkman
- Other names: Danil/Danyil
- Born: April 17, 1999 (age 27) Saint Petersburg, Russia
- Height: 1.94 m (6 ft 4 1/2 in)

Figure skating career
- Country: United States (since 2023); Georgia (2020–23); Russia (2017–18)
- Discipline: Pair skating
- Partner: Starr Andrews (since 2026); Katie McBeath (2023–26); Anastasiia Metelkina (2020–22); Elena Pavlova (2017–18)
- Coach: Jenni Meno-Sand; Todd Sand; Christine Binder; Brandon Frazier
- Began skating: 2003

Medal record
Representing United States
U.S. Championships
| Silver medal – second place | 2025 Wichita | Pairs |
| Bronze medal – third place | 2026 St. Louis | Pairs |

Daniil Vladimirovich Parkman (Russian: Даниил Владимирович Паркман; Georgian: დანიილ ვლადიმიროვიჩ პარკმანი; born April 17, 1999) is a Russian-born pair skater who currently represents the United States. With Katie McBeath, he is the 2025 CS John Nicks Pairs Competition bronze medalist, the 2025 U.S. national silver medalist, and 2026 U.S. national bronze medalist.

He previously skated for Georgia with Anastasiia Metelkina. Together, they were the 2022 Grand Prix of Espoo bronze medalists and the 2021 CS Golden Spin of Zagreb silver medalists. They also became the first Georgian pairs team to compete at a World Championships (2021).

== Personal life ==
Parkman was born in Saint Petersburg, Russia on April 17, 1999. At the age of one-and-a-half years old, Parkman and his parents moved to Seattle, Washington, before moving back to Russia when Parkman was a pre-teen. He is bilingual and able to fluently communicate in Russian and English.

Outside of figure skating, he also enjoys surfing.

== Career ==
=== Early career ===
Parkman began figure skating in 2003 while living in the United States, but began skating competitively after he and his family returned to Russia. As a singles skater, he won the gold medal on the junior level at the 2012 Tallinn Trophy. He switched to pair skating in 2015 at the age of sixteen due to his tall stature and was initially joined Nina Mozer's group in Moscow.

His first pair partners were Daria Lobova and Elena Pavlova, both of whom he competed with for Russia. In 2019, Parkman teamed up with fellow Russian pair skater, Viktoria Yatsenko, and had intended on representing Belarus with her, however, the couple never competed internationally together and would ultimately split.

=== Partnership with Metelkina ===
==== 2020–21 season: Debut of Metelkina/Parkman ====
In December 2020, it was announced that Parkman had teamed up with fellow Russian pair skater, Anastasia Metelkina, and that they would be representing Georgia together, while being coached by Vasili Velikov. In February 2021, it was announced that the pair had earned the minimum technical scores to compete at the 2021 World Championships in Stockholm, Sweden.

Making their debut as a pair team at these Championships, Metelkina/Parkman placed fourteenth in the short program and sixteenth in the free skate, finishing the event in sixteenth-place overall. They became the first Georgian pair team to compete at a World Championships.

==== 2021–22 season ====
Metelkina/Parkman began their season with a silver medal at the 2021 Budapest Trophy, before going on to finish fifth at the 2021 CS Warsaw Cup. At the 2021 CS Golden Spin of Zagreb, the pair took the silver medal.

Although assigned to compete at both the 2022 European Championships and the 2022 World Championships, the pair ultimately withdrew from both events and were replaced by Karina Safina / Luka Berulava.

==== 2022–23 season: Grand Prix bronze ====
Metelkina/Parkman opened their season at the 2022 CS Nebelhorn Trophy, finishing fifth. They went on to compete on the Grand Prix series, finishing fourth at the 2022 MK John Wilson Trophy as well as taking bronze at the 2022 Grand Prix of Espoo.

Despite being selected to compete at the 2023 European Championships, Metelkina/Parkman ultimately ended their partnership in December 2022 due to undisclosed issues between Parkman and the Georgian Figure Skating Federation.

=== Partnership with McBeath ===
==== 2023–24 season: Debut of McBeath/Parkman ====
In spring 2023, Parkman traveled to Irvine, California to have a pair skating tryout with American pair skater, Katie McBeath, whose previous partner, Nathan Bartholomay, had recently retired. The pair teamed up following the success of the tryout. In July 2023, it was announced that they would represent the United States together and that they would train at Great Park Ice under coaches Jenni Meno, Todd Sand, Christine Binder, and Brandon Frazier.

The pair debuted at the 2023 U.S. Pairs Final where they won the gold medal, thus qualifying for the 2024 U.S. Championships. McBeath/Parkman skated a strong solid short program, placing third in that segment of the competition. However, during practice the following day, McBeath's blade snapped and fractured into two pieces while landing a throw jump. As a result, McBeath had to complete the free skate on a new blade. The pair dropped to fifth place overall following an error-ridden free skate. Following the event, McBeath said, “It’ll make us stronger. We can call upon this moment if we have some other kind of emergency. Like, okay, what did we learn? That’s what we’ll take from it.”

==== 2024–25 season: U.S. National silver ====
McBeath/Parkman began their season by competing at the 2024 CS John Nicks International Pairs Competition, where they finished fifth. Selected as host picks for 2024 Skate America, they finished seventh at the event. They were later assigned to the 2024 Cup of China as well, where they placed fifth.

In January, at the 2025 U.S. Championships, McBeath/Parkman placed fourth in the short program and second in the free skate, winning the silver medal overall. “It feels absolutely amazing!” McBeath exclaimed. “It has been a dream to be on a national podium, and it came through today, so I’m very happy about that for us.” This result marked McBeath's first national medal. The team were then named as first alternates for the World Championship team.

McBeath/Parkman subsequently finished the season by winning silver at the Road to 26 Trophy, a test event for the 2026 Winter Olympics.

==== 2025–26 season: Four Continents debut ====
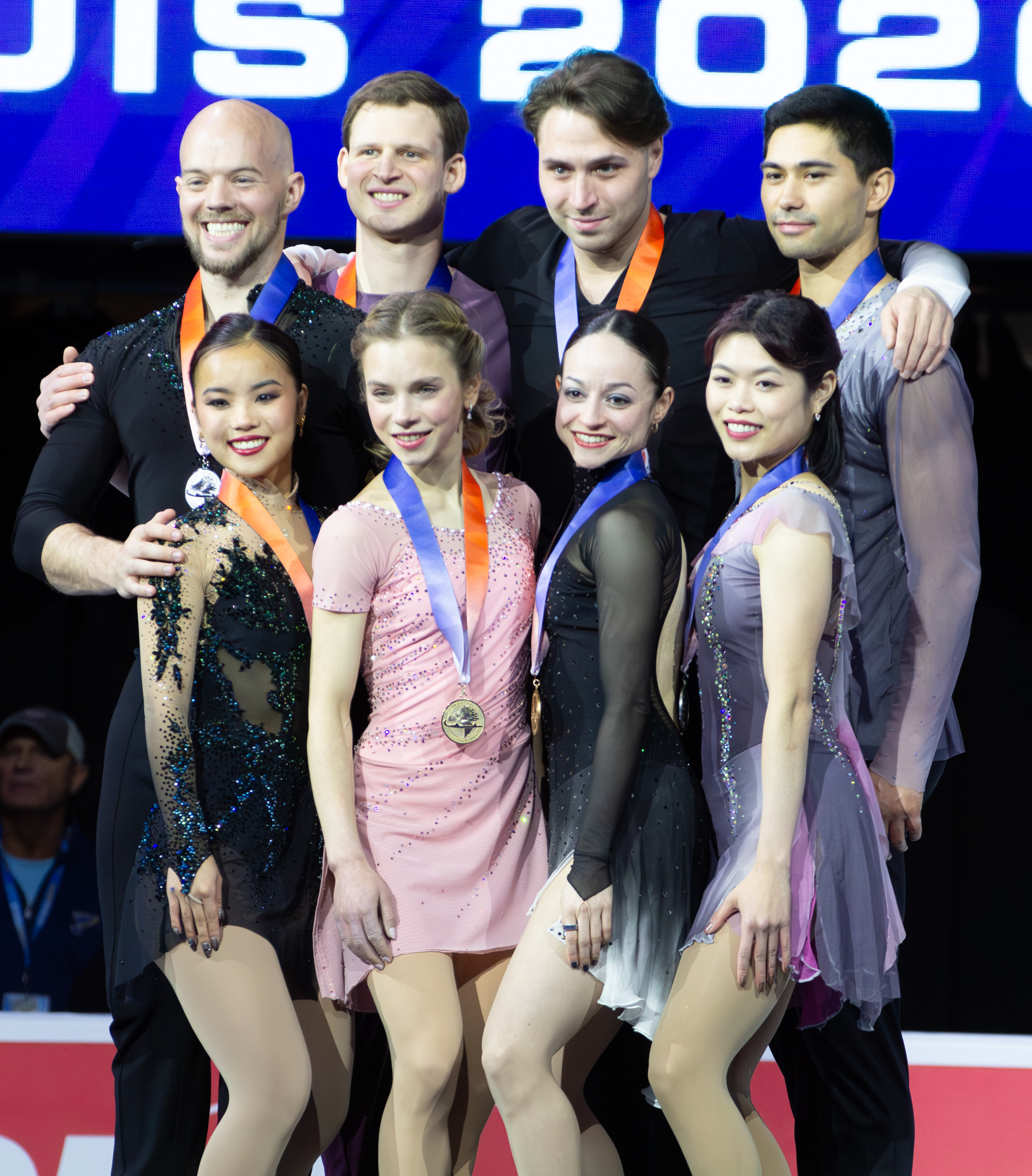
McBeath and Parkman (center right) during the medal ceremony at the 2026 U.S. Championships

McBeath/Parkman opened the season by competing on the 2025–26 Challenger Series, winning bronze at the 2025 CS John Nicks International Pairs Competition and finishing fifth at the 2025 CS Nebelhorn Trophy. Going on to compete on the 2025–26 Grand Prix series, they placed fourth at the 2025 Grand Prix de France and seventh at the 2025 Cup of China. They followed this up by winning bronze at the 2025 Warsaw Cup.

In January, McBeath/Parkman competed at the 2026 U.S. Championships, winning the bronze medal. Due to Parkman not having American citizenship, the pair were not eligible for the 2026 Winter Olympic U.S. team selection. They were instead named to the 2026 Four Continents team and the 2026 World team.

On May 7, 2026, the pair split. On 11 May, it was announced that Parkman would continue his skating career, entering a new partnership with Starr Andrews.

== Programs ==
=== Pair skating with Katie McBeath (for the United States) ===
| Season | Short program | Free skating | Exhibition |
|---|---|---|---|
| 2025–2026 | Vale by Christian Reindl, Lucie Paradis, & Power-Haus choreo. by Pasquale Camerlengo | Caruso (Live) by Lucio Dalla performed by Lara Fabian choreo. by Nikolai Morozov | |
| 2024–2025 | Love Is a Lie by Beth Hart choreo. by Brandon Frazier | Per te by Josh Groban; In nome dell’amore by Karl Hugo choreo. by Nikolai Morozov | Caruso (Live) by Lucio Dalla performed by Lara Fabian choreo. by Nikolai Morozov; American Woman by The Guess Who performed by Lenny Kravitz |
| 2023–2024 | Requiem for a Dream by Clint Mansell performed by Cihat Aşkın; Prince Negaafellaga Introduction by Prince Fellaga choreo. by Yura Min, Shae-Lynn Bourne | Wicked Game by Chris Isaak performed by Ursine Vulpine & Annaca choreo. by Yura Min, Brandon Frazier | |

=== Pair skating with Anastasiia Metelkina (for Georgia) ===
| Season | Short program | Free skate | Exhibition | Ref. |
|---|---|---|---|---|
| 2020–21 | "Nothing Else Matters" By Metallica Performed by Marlisa Choreo. by Yuri Anonian | "Rain, In Your Black Eyes" By Ezio Bosso Choreo. by Yuri Anonian | —N/a | |
| 2021–22 | "Can't Help Falling in Love" Performed by Tommee Profitt, feat. brooke Choreo. by Yuri Anonian | "Rain, In Your Black Eyes" By Ezio Bosso Choreo. by Yuri Anonian | —N/a | |
| 2022–23 | "I'll Take Care of You" Performed by Beth Hart & Joe Bonamassa Choreo. by Denis Lunin | "Lamentations" By Marimuz Choreo. by Denis Lunin | "Say Something" By A Great Big World, feat. Christina Aguilera Performed by James Harris | |

== Competitive highlights ==
- GP – Event of the ISU Grand Prix Series
- CS – Event of the ISU Challenger Series
- TBD – Assigned
- WD – Withdrew from competition

=== Pair skating with Starr Andrews (for the United States) ===
Competition placements at senior level
| Season | 2026–27 |
|---|---|
| CS Warsaw Cup | TBD |

=== Pair skating with Katie McBeath (for the United States) ===
Competition placements at senior level
| Season | 2023–24 | 2024–25 | 2025–26 |
|---|---|---|---|
| World Championships | | | 12th |
| Four Continents Championships | | | 6th |
| U.S. Championships | 5th | 2nd | 3rd |
| GP Cup of China | | 5th | 7th |
| GP France | | | 4th |
| GP Skate America | | 7th | |
| CS John Nicks Pairs | | 5th | 3rd |
| CS Nebelhorn Trophy | | | 5th |
| Road to 26 Trophy | | 2nd | |
| Warsaw Cup | | | 3rd |

=== Pair skating with Anastasiia Metelkina (for Georgia) ===
Competition placements at senior level
| Season | 2020–21 | 2021–22 | 2022–23 |
|---|---|---|---|
| World Championships | 16th | | |
| GP Finland | | | 3rd |
| GP Wilson Trophy | | | 4th |
| CS Golden Spin of Zagreb | | 2nd | |
| CS Nebelhorn Trophy | | | 5th |
| CS Warsaw Cup | | 5th | |
| Budapest Trophy | | 2nd | |
| Denis Ten Memorial | | 4th | |

=== Pair skating with Elena Pavlova (for Russia) ===
Competition placements at junior level
| Season | 2017-18 |
|---|---|
| Golden Spin of Zagreb | 4th |

=== Men's singles (for Russia) ===
Competition placements at junior level
| Season | 2012-13 |
|---|---|
| Tallinn Trophy | 1st |

== Detailed results ==
=== Pair skating with Starr Andrews (for the United States) ===
Results in the 2026–27 season
| Date | Event | SP | | FS | | Total | |
| Date | Event | P | Score | P | Score | P | Score |
|---|---|---|---|---|---|---|---|
| Nov 25–29, 2026 | (Poland) 2026 CS Warsaw Cup | | | | | | |

=== Pair skating with Katie McBeath (for the United States) ===
ISU personal best scores in the +5/-5 GOE System
| Segment | Type | Score | Event |
|---|---|---|---|
| Total | TSS | 187.89 | 2025 CS John Nicks Pairs Competition |
| Short program | TSS | 65.62 | 2025 CS John Nicks Pairs Competition |
| Short program | TES | 36.49 | 2025 CS John Nicks Pairs Competition |
| Short program | PCS | 29.13 | 2025 CS John Nicks Pairs Competition |
| Free skating | TSS | 122.27 | 2025 CS John Nicks Pairs Competition |
| Free skating | TES | 63.56 | 2024 CS John Nicks Pairs Competition |
| Free skating | PCS | 60.75 | 2025 CS John Nicks Pairs Competition |

Results in the 2023–24 season
| Date | Event | SP | | FS | | Total | |
| Date | Event | P | Score | P | Score | P | Score |
|---|---|---|---|---|---|---|---|
| Jan 22–28, 2024 | (United States) 2024 U.S. Championships | 3 | 64.21 | 5 | 115.78 | 5 | 172.81 |

Results in the 2024–25 season
| Date | Event | SP | | FS | | Total | |
| Date | Event | P | Score | P | Score | P | Score |
|---|---|---|---|---|---|---|---|
| Sep 3–4, 2024 | (United States) 2024 CS John Nicks Pairs Competition | 10 | 54.41 | 3 | 118.96 | 5 | 173.37 |
| Oct 18–20, 2024 | (United States) 2024 Skate America | 8 | 56.69 | 7 | 111.39 | 7 | 168.08 |
| Nov 22–24, 2024 | 2024 Cup of China | 8 | 42.67 | 4 | 117.25 | 5 | 159.92 |
| Jan 20–26, 2025 | (United States) 2025 U.S. Championships | 4 | 62.92 | 2 | 127.65 | 2 | 190.57 |
| Feb 19–20, 2025 | (Italy) 2025 Road to 26 Trophy | 2 | 57.07 | 1 | 108.69 | 2 | 165.76 |

Results in the 2025–26 season
| Date | Event | SP | | FS | | Total | |
| Date | Event | P | Score | P | Score | P | Score |
|---|---|---|---|---|---|---|---|
| Sep 2–3, 2025 | (United States) 2025 CS John Nicks International Pairs Competition | 3 | 65.62 | 3 | 122.27 | 3 | 187.89 |
| Sep 25–27, 2025 | (Germany) 2025 CS Nebelhorn Trophy | 6 | 64.24 | 6 | 119.57 | 5 | 183.81 |
| Oct 17–19, 2025 | 2025 Grand Prix de France | 4 | 63.31 | 4 | 114.77 | 4 | 178.08 |
| Oct 24–26, 2025 | 2025 Cup of China | 4 | 69.18 | 7 | 112.52 | 7 | 181.70 |
| Nov 19–23, 2025 | (Poland) 2025 Warsaw Cup | 3 | 59.69 | 3 | 100.57 | 3 | 160.26 |
| Jan 4–11, 2026 | (United States) 2026 U.S. Championships | 5 | 66.81 | 4 | 120.64 | 3 | 187.45 |
| Jan 21–25, 2026 | (China) 2026 Four Continents Championships | 7 | 59.68 | 6 | 121.44 | 6 | 181.12 |
| Mar 24–29, 2026 | (Czech Republic) 2026 World Championships | 11 | 64.42 | 12 | 115.18 | 12 | 179.60 |

=== Pair skating with Anastasiia Metelkina (for Georgia) ===
ISU personal best scores in the +5/-5 GOE System
| Segment | Type | Score | Event |
|---|---|---|---|
| Total | TSS | 189.60 | 2021 CS Golden Spin of Zagreb |
| Short program | TSS | 65.97 | 2021 CS Golden Spin of Zagreb |
| Short program | TES | 35.81 | 2021 CS Golden Spin of Zagreb |
| Short program | PCS | 30.16 | 2021 CS Golden Spin of Zagreb |
| Free skating | TSS | 123.63 | 2021 CS Golden Spin of Zagreb |
| Free skating | TES | 62.75 | 2021 CS Golden Spin of Zagreb |
| Free skating | PCS | 60.88 | 2021 CS Golden Spin of Zagreb |

Results in the 2020–21 season
| Date | Event | SP | | FS | | Total | |
| Date | Event | P | Score | P | Score | P | Score |
|---|---|---|---|---|---|---|---|
| Mar 22–28, 2021 | (Sweden) 2021 World Championships | 14 | 56.13 | 16 | 100.60 | 16 | 156.73 |

Results in the 2021–22 season
| Date | Event | SP | | FS | | Total | |
| Date | Event | P | Score | P | Score | P | Score |
|---|---|---|---|---|---|---|---|
| Oct 14–17, 2021 | (Hungary) 2021 Budapest Trophy | 2 | 66.52 | 2 | 121.51 | 2 | 188.03 |
| Oct 27–31, 2021 | (Kazakhstan) 2021 Denis Ten Memorial Challenge | 5 | 61.06 | 4 | 114.36 | 4 | 175.42 |
| Nov 17–20, 2021 | (Poland) 2021 CS Warsaw Cup | 4 | 62.70 | 4 | 121.54 | 5 | 184.24 |
| Dec 9–11, 2021 | (Croatia) 2021 CS Golden Spin of Zagreb | 4 | 65.97 | 4 | 123.63 | 2 | 189.60 |

Results in the 2022–23 season
| Date | Event | SP | | FS | | Total | |
| Date | Event | P | Score | P | Score | P | Score |
|---|---|---|---|---|---|---|---|
| Sep 21–24, 2022 | (Germany) 2022 CS Nebelhorn Trophy | 5 | 62.15 | 5 | 103.29 | 5 | 165.44 |
| Nov 11–13, 2022 | (United Kingdom) 2022 MK John Wilson Trophy | 4 | 58.70 | 4 | 106.90 | 4 | 165.60 |
| Nov 25–27, 2022 | (Finland) 2022 Grand Prix of Espoo | 3 | 62.59 | 3 | 103.97 | 3 | 166.56 |
