= Katie McBeath =

American pair skater (born 1994)

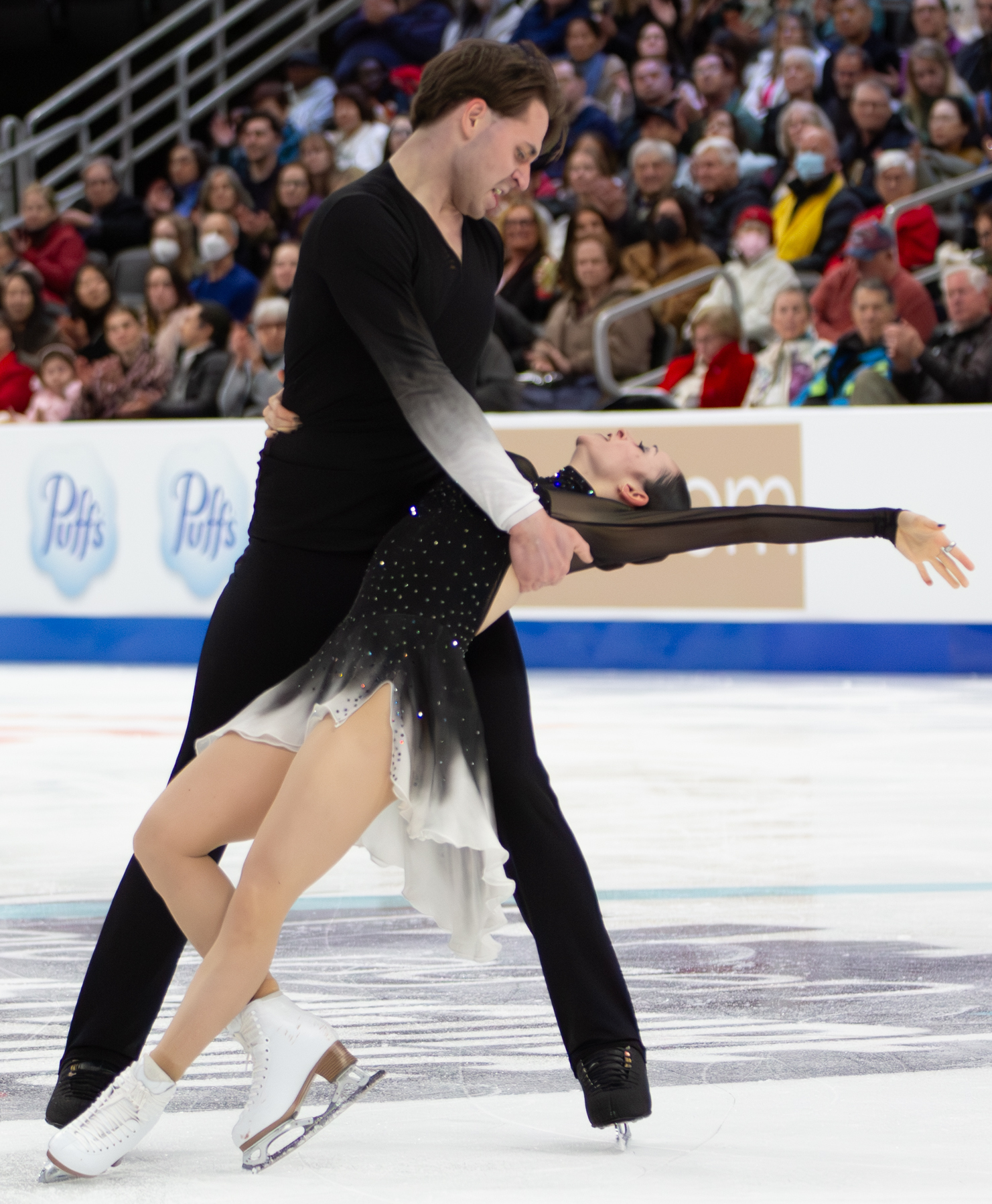
- Katie McBeath and Daniil Parkman at the 2026 U.S. Championships

Personal information
- Born: December 2, 1994 (age 31) Garfield Heights, Ohio, U.S.
- Home town: Garfield Heights, Ohio, U.S.
- Height: 5 ft 1 in (1.55 m)

Figure skating career
- Country: United States
- Discipline: Pair skating
- Partner: Balázs Nagy (since 2026); Daniil Parkman (2023–26); Nathan Bartholomay (2020–23)
- Coach: Jenni Meno; Todd Sand; Brandon Frazier; Christine Binder
- Skating club: Winterhurst FSC
- Began skating: 2000

Medal record
U.S. Championships
Silver medal – second place	2025 Wichita	Pairs
Bronze medal – third place	2026 St. Louis	Pairs

Katie McBeath (born December 2, 1994) is an American pair skater. With her current partner, Balázs Nagy, she is the 2026 Skate America bronze medalist. With former partner Daniil Parkman, she is the 2025 CS John Nicks Pairs Competition bronze medalist, the 2025 U.S. national silver medalist, and the 2026 U.S. national bronze medalist.

== Personal life ==
McBeath was born on December 2, 1994 in Garfield Heights, Ohio, United States.

In 2019, she earned an undergraduate degree in psychology at Cleveland State University and is currently pursuing a master's program at Southern New Hampshire University.

She previously dated her former pair skating partner, Nathan Bartholomay.

== Career ==
=== Early years and women's singles ===
McBeath began learning how to skate in 2000 at the age of six after watching Disney on Ice.

She placed second in the 2015 U.S. Collegiate Championship, and won the competition in 2018. She competed in singles at the U.S. Championships from 2015 until 2019, with her highest placement being thirteenth.

=== Partnership with Bartholomay ===
==== 2020–21 season: Debut of McBeath/Bartholomay ====
At the end of May 2020, McBeath and Nathan Bartholomay announced that they had teamed up and were training in Irvine, California under Jenni Meno, Todd Sand, Christine Binder, and Chris Knierim. They made their debut as a pair as at the virtual ISP Points Challenge, where they were seventh. They also placed seventh during their national debut at the 2021 U.S. Championships.

==== 2021–22 season: Four Continents debut ====
McBeath/Bartholomay made their international debut at the 2021 Cranberry Cup International, where they finished seventh. They followed this up with an eighth-place finish at the 2021 John Nicks Pairs Challenge and fifth-place finish at the 2021 CS Autumn Classic International.

In January, McBeath/Bartholomay placed fifth at the 2022 U.S. Championships, before going on to finish fifth at the 2022 Four Continents Championships.

==== 2022–23 season: Grand Prix debut ====
McBeath/Bartholomay began the season by placing sixth at the 2022 MK John Wilson Trophy and sixth at the 2022 CS Golden Spin of Zagreb.

They subsequently closed the season by finishing sixth at the 2023 U.S. Championships. McBeath/Bartholomay parted ways at the end of the season, as the latter retired due to a back injury.

=== Partnership with Parkman ===
==== 2023–24 season: Debut of McBeath/Parkman ====
In July 2023, it was announced that McBeath had teamed up with Russian-born pair skater, Daniil Parkman and that they would train at Great Park Ice under coaches Jenni Meno, Todd Sand, Christine Binder, and Brandon Frazier.

The pair debuted at the 2023 U.S. Pairs Final where they won the gold medal, thus qualifying for the 2024 U.S. Championships. McBeath/Parkman skated a strong solid short program, placing third in that segment of the competition. However, during practice the following day, McBeath's blade snapped and fractured into two pieces while landing a throw jump. As a result, McBeath had to complete the free skate on a new blade. The pair dropped to fifth place overall following an error-ridden free skate. Following the event, McBeath said, “It’ll make us stronger. We can call upon this moment if we have some other kind of emergency. Like, okay, what did we learn? That’s what we’ll take from it.”

==== 2024–25 season: U.S. National silver ====
McBeath/Parkman began their season by competing at the 2024 CS John Nicks International Pairs Competition, where they finished fifth. Selected as host picks for 2024 Skate America, they finished seventh at the event. They were later assigned to the 2024 Cup of China as well, where they placed fifth.

In January, at the 2025 U.S. Championships, McBeath/Parkman placed fourth in the short program and second in the free skate, winning the silver medal overall. “It feels absolutely amazing!” McBeath exclaimed. “It has been a dream to be on a national podium, and it came through today, so I’m very happy about that for us.” This result marked McBeath's first national medal. The team were then named as first alternates for the World Championship team.

McBeath/Parkman subsequently finished the season by winning silver at the Road to 26 Trophy, a test event for the 2026 Winter Olympics.

==== 2025–26 season: World Championships debut ====
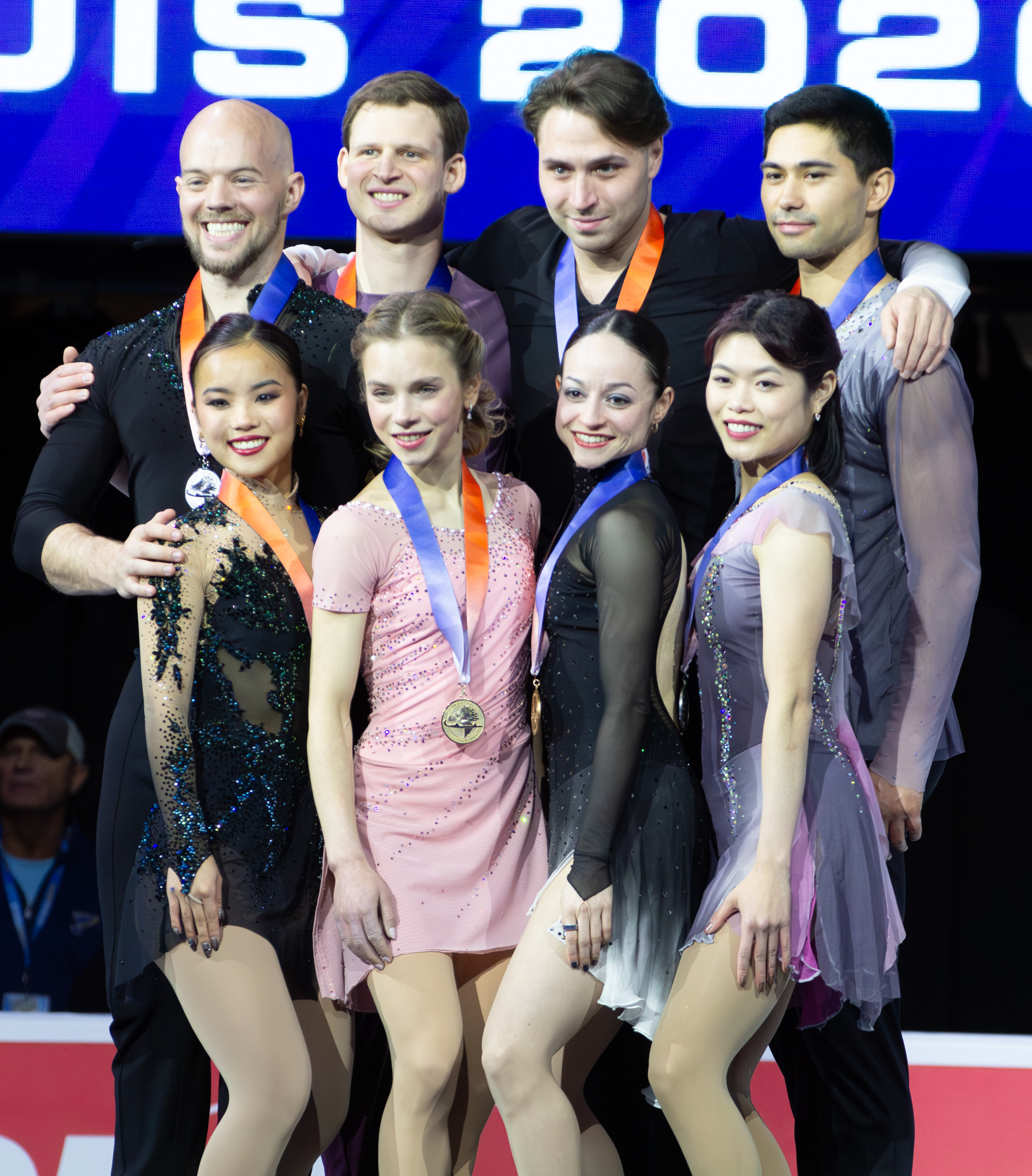
McBeath and Parkman (center right) during the medal ceremony at the 2026 U.S. Championships

McBeath/Parkman opened the season by competing on the 2025–26 Challenger Series, winning bronze at the 2025 CS John Nicks International Pairs Competition and finishing fifth at the 2025 CS Nebelhorn Trophy. Going on to compete on the 2025–26 Grand Prix series, they placed fourth at the 2025 Grand Prix de France and seventh at the 2025 Cup of China. They followed this up by winning bronze at the 2025 Warsaw Cup.

In January, McBeath/Parkman competed at the 2026 U.S. Championships, winning the bronze medal. Due to Parkman not having American citizenship, the pair were not eligible for the 2026 Winter Olympic U.S. team selection. They were instead named to the 2026 Four Continents team and the 2026 World team.

On May 7, 2026, the pair split. It was later announced that McBeath had teamed up with Balázs Nagy.

=== Partnership with Nagy ===
==== 2026–27 season: First Grand Prix medal ====
McBeath and Nagy made their debut at the 2026 John Nicks Pairs Challenge, finishing in third place overall.

They then finished third at the 2026 Skate America, winning McBeath's first ever medal on the ISU Grand Prix. “Katie and I are both very proud of our skate,” said Nagy after the free skate. “We’ve been training very hard. It feels good to have kind of the work we’ve been doing at home validated with the result.”

The following week, McBeath and Nagy competed at the 2026 Finlandia Trophy, where they finished fourth. “It’s been a long two weeks, and we’re glad to be done,” said Nagy. “We’ve had two good competitions in a row. We knew today would be hard, and it was.”

== Programs ==
=== With Nagy ===
Season	Short program	Free skating	Exhibition
2026–2027	Carmen; by Bizet	Experience; by Ludovico Einadu	

=== With Parkman ===
Season	Short program	Free skating	Exhibition
2025–2026	Vale by Christian Reindl, Lucie Paradis, & Power-Haus choreo. by Pasquale Camerlengo	Caruso (Live) by Lucio Dalla performed by Lara Fabian choreo. by Nikolai Morozov	
2024–2025	Love Is a Lie by Beth Hart choreo. by Brandon Frazier	Per te by Josh Groban; In nome dell’amore by Karl Hugo choreo. by Nikolai Morozov	American Woman by The Guess Who performed by Lenny Kravitz; Caruso (Live) by Lucio Dalla performed by Lara Fabian choreo. by Nikolai Morozov
2023–2024	Requiem for a Dream by Clint Mansell performed by Cihat Aşkın; Prince Negaafellaga Introduction by Prince Fellaga choreo. by Yura Min, Shae-Lynn Bourne	Wicked Game by Chris Isaak performed by Ursine Vulpine & Annaca choreo. by Yura Min, Brandon Frazier	

=== Pairs with Bartholomay ===
Season	Short program	Free skating
2022–2023	Your Heart is as Black as Night by Beth Hart, Joe Bonamassa choreo. by Renée Roca	The Blower's Daughter by Damien Rice performed by Christina Aguilera and Chris Mann choreo. by Cindy Stuart
2021–2022	Leave a Light On by Tom Walker choreo. by Renée Roca	The Blower's Daughter by Damien Rice performed by Christina Aguilera and Chris Mann choreo. by Cindy Stuart
2020–2021	Cry Me a River by Arthur Hamilton performed by Michael Bublé	Arrival of the Birds by London Metropolitan Orchestra; Turning Page by Sleeping at Last

=== Women's singles ===
Season	Short program	Free skating
2018–2019	Prayer for Taylor by Michael W. Smith	Schindler's List by John Williams

== Competitive highlights ==
- GP – Event of the ISU Grand Prix Series
- CS – Event of the ISU Challenger Series
- TBD – Assigned
- WD – Withdrew from competition

=== Pair skating with Balazs Nagy ===
Competition placements at senior level
Season	2026–27
GP Finland	4th
GP Skate America	3rd
CS John Nicks	3rd
CS Trialeti Trophy	5th

=== Pair skating with Daniil Parkman ===
Competition placements at senior level
Season	2023–24	2024–25	2025–26
World Championships			12th
Four Continents Championships			6th
U.S. Championships	5th	2nd	3rd
GP Cup of China		5th	7th
GP France			4th
GP Skate America		7th	
CS John Nicks Pairs		5th	3rd
CS Nebelhorn Trophy			5th
Road to 26 Trophy		2nd	
Warsaw Cup			3rd

=== Pair skating with Nathan Bartholomay ===
Competition placements at senior level
Season	2020–21	2021–22	2022–23
Four Continents Championships		5th	
U.S. Championships	7th	5th	6th
GP Wilson Trophy			6th
CS Autumn Classic		5th	
CS Golden Spin of Zagreb			6th
Cranberry Cup		7th	
John Nicks Challenge		8th	

=== Women's singles ===
International
Event	14–15	15–16	16–17	17–18	18–19
CS Nepela Trophy					5th
Philadelphia					1st
National
U.S. Championships	18th	13th	16th	18th	
U.S. Collegiate Champ.	2nd			1st	

== Detailed results ==
=== Pair skating with Balázs Nagy ===
ISU personal best scores in the +5/-5 GOE System
Segment	Type	Score	Event
Total	**TSS**	**191.25**	2026 Finlandia Trophy
Short program	**TSS**	**70.81**	2026 Finlandia Trophy
Short program	TES	40.79	2026 Finlandia Trophy
Short program	PCS	30.02	2026 Finlandia Trophy
Free skating	**TSS**	**120.44**	2026 Finlandia Trophy
Free skating	TES	58.76	2026 Skate America
Free skating	PCS	62.30	2026 Finlandia Trophy

Results in the 2026–27 season
Date	Event	SP		FS		Total	
Date	Event	P	Score	P	Score	P	Score
Sep 11–12, 2026	(United States) 2026 CS John Nicks Pairs Challenge	4	67.17	3	113.78	3	180.95
Sep 30 – Oct 3, 2026	(Georgia (country)) 2026 CS Trialeti Trophy	5	55.39	5	103.95	5	159.34
Nov 13–15, 2026	(United States) 2026 Skate America	5	67.62	3	119.51	3	187.13
Nov 20–21, 2026	(Finland) 2026 Finlandia Trophy	3	70.81	4	120.44	4	191.25

=== Pair skating with Daniil Parkman ===
ISU personal best scores in the +5/-5 GOE System
Segment	Type	Score	Event
Total	**TSS**	**187.89**	2025 CS John Nicks Pairs Competition
Short program	**TSS**	**65.62**	2025 CS John Nicks Pairs Competition
Short program	TES	36.49	2025 CS John Nicks Pairs Competition
Short program	PCS	29.13	2025 CS John Nicks Pairs Competition
Free skating	**TSS**	**122.27**	2025 CS John Nicks Pairs Competition
Free skating	TES	63.56	2024 CS John Nicks Pairs Competition
Free skating	PCS	60.75	2025 CS John Nicks Pairs Competition

Results in the 2023–24 season
Date	Event	SP		FS		Total	
Date	Event	P	Score	P	Score	P	Score
Jan 22–28, 2024	(United States) 2024 U.S. Championships	3	64.21	5	115.78	5	172.81

Results in the 2024–25 season
Date	Event	SP		FS		Total	
Date	Event	P	Score	P	Score	P	Score
Sep 3–4, 2024	(United States) 2024 CS John Nicks Pairs Competition	10	54.41	3	118.96	5	173.37
Oct 18–20, 2024	(United States) 2024 Skate America	8	56.69	7	111.39	7	168.08
Nov 22–24, 2024	2024 Cup of China	8	42.67	4	117.25	5	159.92
Jan 20–26, 2025	(United States) 2025 U.S. Championships	4	62.92	2	127.65	2	190.57
Feb 19–20, 2025	(Italy) 2025 Road to 26 Trophy	2	57.07	1	108.69	2	165.76

Results in the 2025–26 season
Date	Event	SP		FS		Total	
Date	Event	P	Score	P	Score	P	Score
Sep 2–3, 2025	(United States) 2025 CS John Nicks International Pairs Competition	3	65.62	3	122.27	3	187.89
Sep 25–27, 2025	(Germany) 2025 CS Nebelhorn Trophy	6	64.24	6	119.57	5	183.81
Oct 17–19, 2025	2025 Grand Prix de France	4	63.31	4	114.77	4	178.08
Oct 24–26, 2025	2025 Cup of China	4	69.18	7	112.52	7	181.70
Nov 19–23, 2025	(Poland) 2025 Warsaw Cup	3	59.69	3	100.57	3	160.26
Jan 4–11, 2026	(United States) 2026 U.S. Championships	5	66.81	4	120.64	3	187.45
Jan 21–25, 2026	(China) 2026 Four Continents Championships	7	59.68	6	121.44	6	181.12
Mar 24–29, 2026	(Czech Republic) 2026 World Championships	11	64.42	12	115.18	12	179.60

=== Pair skating with Nathan Bartholomay ===
Current personal best scores are highlighted in bold.

**2022–23 season**
Date	Event	SP	FS	Total
January 23–29, 2023	2023 U.S. Championships	6; 59.96	5; 115.78	6; 172.74
December 7–10, 2022	2022 CS Golden Spin of Zagreb	5; 60.68	6; 102.13	6; 162.81
November 11–13, 2022	2022 MK John Wilson Trophy	5; 57.21	7; 90.08	6; 147.29
**2021–22 season**
Date	Event	SP	FS	Total
January 18–23, 2022	2022 Four Continents Championships	4; 59.54	5; 108.64	5; 168.18
January 3–9, 2022	2022 U.S. Championships	6; 50.11	4; 116.99	5; 167.10
September 16–18, 2021	2021 CS Autumn Classic International	5; 56.60	4; 112.01	5; 168.61
September 9–10, 2021	2021 John Nicks Pairs Challenge	7; 56.41	8; 105.28	8; 161.69
August 11–15, 2021	2021 Cranberry Cup International	7; 52.13	6; 105.61	7; 157.74
**2020–21 season**
Date	Event	SP	FS	Total
January 11–21, 2021	2021 U.S. Championships	7; 58.23	7; 105.50	7; 163.73
