= Meekins =

Meekins is a surname. Notable people with the surname include:

- Chuck Meekins (1933–1996), American racing driver
- Drew Meekins (born 1985), American pair skater and choreographer
- Isaac Melson Meekins (1875–1946), American judge
- Marlo Meekins, American cartoonist
- Russ Meekins Sr. (1915–1995), American politician
- Russ Meekins Jr. (1949–2020), American politician
