= Russ Meekins =

Russ Meekins is the name of:

- Russ Meekins Sr., American politician, father
- Russ Meekins Jr., American politician, son
