= Naomi Williams =

American pair skater (born 2006)

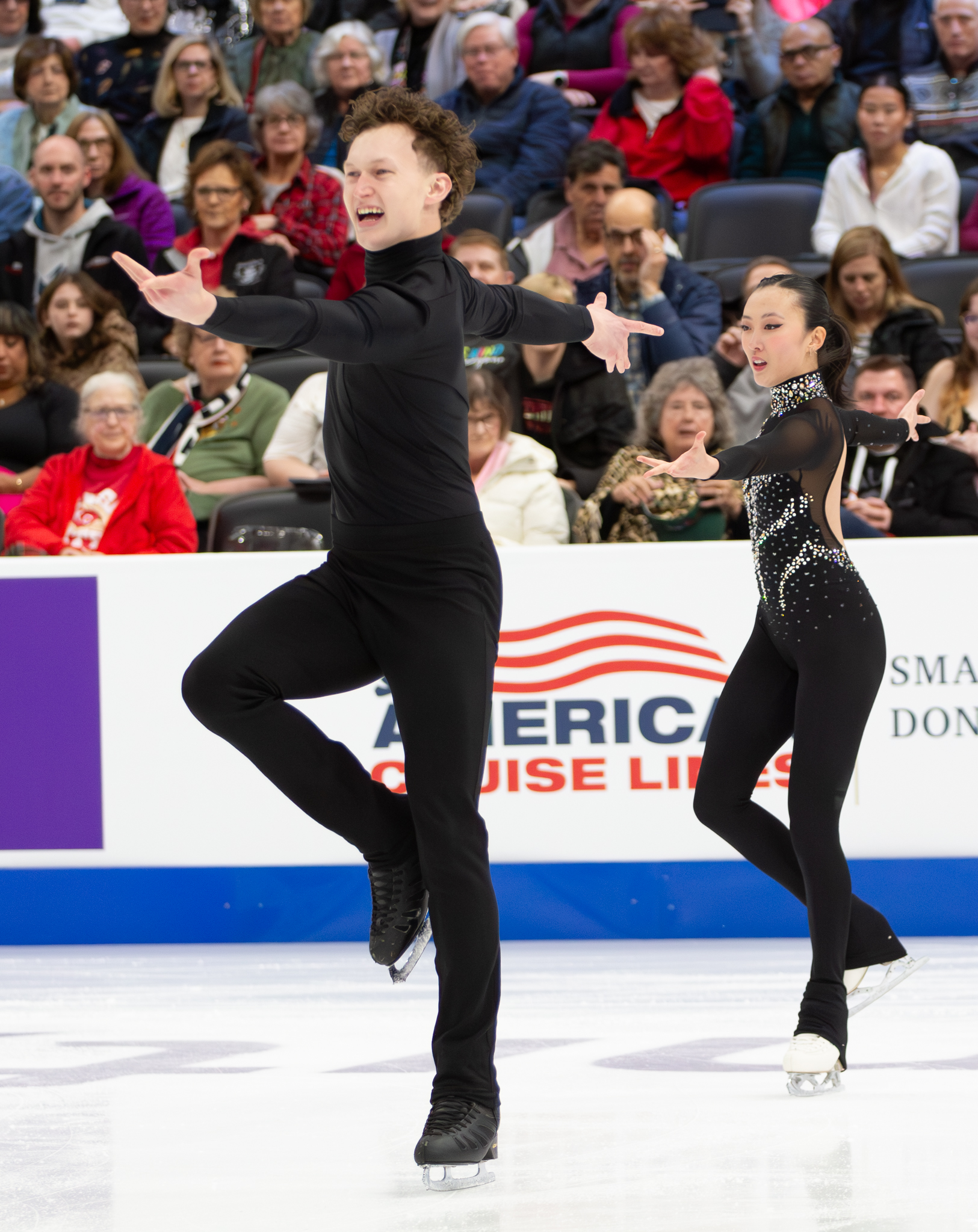
- Naomi Williams and Lachlan Lewer at the 2026 U.S. Championships

Personal information
- Born: July 14, 2006 (age 20) Seoul, South Korea
- Home town: Boston, Massachusetts, U.S.
- Height: 5 ft 2 in (1.58 m)

Figure skating career
- Country: United States
- Discipline: Pair skating
- Partner: Lachlan Lewer (since 2022)
- Coach: Drew Meekins; Natalia Mishkutenok; Eddie Shipstad
- Skating club: Skating Club of Boston
- Began skating: 2010

Medal record
World Junior Championships
Bronze medal – third place	2024 Taipei	Pairs

Naomi Williams (born July 14, 2006) is an American pair skater. With her partner Lachlan Lewer, she is the 2024 World Junior bronze medalist and a two-time U.S. junior national silver medalist (2023–2024).

== Personal life ==
Williams was born on July 14, 2006, in Seoul, South Korea. She was adopted at the age of four months by American couple, Danielle and Michael Williams. Williams' mother works as an esthetician, and her father works as a lawyer and accountant. She also has a younger sister, Shayla.

She currently attends the University of Colorado Colorado Springs and has expressed interest in pursuing a career in forensic science.

== Career ==
=== Early career ===
Williams began figure skating in 2010. Before switching to the pairs discipline, she previously competed as a women's singles skater.

=== Partnership with Lewer ===
==== 2022–2023 season: Junior international debut ====
In August 2022, Williams teamed up with Australian pair skater, Lachlan Lewer, to compete in the pairs discipline. It was soon announced that the team would train in Colorado Springs, Colorado under coaches, Drew Meekins and Natalia Mishkutenok.

The pair debuted at the 2023 Midwestern Sectional Championships, where they won the silver medal on the junior level. They subsequently won the silver medal at the 2023 U.S. Junior Championships and the gold medal on the junior level of the 2023 Bavarian Open.

Selected to represent the United States at the 2023 World Junior Championships, the pair came in seventh place.

==== 2023–2024 season: World Junior bronze ====
Although initially assigned to compete on the 2023–24 ISU Junior Grand Prix, Williams/Lewer were forced to miss entire series due to Williams tearing a ligament in her ankle and requiring surgery. After six weeks off the ice, Williams would return to training in late October. They would make their return to competition at the 2024 U.S. Junior Championships, winning silver for a second consecutive time.

Willis/Lewer then competed at the 2024 World Junior Championships, winning the bronze medal. “I am so happy and proud of what we have done after all we have been through,” said Williams. “It was a really rough time this season.

==== 2024–2025 season: Senior international debut ====
Debuting on the senior international level, Williams/Lewer started the season by finishing eleventh at the 2024 CS John Nicks International Pairs Competition and winning bronze at the 2024 Tayside Trophy.

Given one ISU senior Grand Prix assignment, the team competed at the 2024 Finlandia Trophy, where they came in eighth place.

In January, Williams/Lewer made their senior national debut at the 2025 U.S. Championships in Wichita, Kansas, coming in sixth place. Selected to compete at the 2025 World Junior Championships in Debrecen, Hungary, the pair closed the season by finishing that event in ninth place.

==== 2025–2026 season: Junior Grand Prix medal ====
In August, Williams/Lewer started the season by competing on the 2025–26 ISU Junior Grand Prix series, winning the bronze medal at 2025 JGP Latvia and fifth at 2025 JGP Poland. They were ultimately named as the first alternates for the 2025–26 Junior Grand Prix Final. Between their two Junior Grand Prix events, Williams/Lewer also competed on the senior level at the 2025 CS John Nicks International Pairs Competition, where they finished in tenth place.

In January, Williams/Lewer competed at the 2026 U.S. Championships, where they finished in ninth place.

==== 2026–2027 season ====
The pair opened the new season by placing seventh at the 2026 John Nicks Challenge.

== Programs ==
=== Pair skating with Lachlan Lewer ===
Season	Short program	Free skating	Exhibition
2022–2023	Tiny Dancer by Elton John performed by Florence and the Machine choreo. by Drew Meekins	Miss Saigon by Claude-Michel Schönberg performed by Bournemouth Symphony Orchestra choreo. by Drew Meekins	
2023–2024	Joli garçon by Pink Martini choreo. by Drew Meekins	Miss Saigon by Claude-Michel Schönberg performed by Bournemouth Symphony Orchestra choreo. by Drew Meekins	One Way or Another by Blondie
2024–2025	Joli garçon by Pink Martini choreo. by Drew Meekins	Eleanor Rigby by The Beatles performed by Cody Fry choreo. by Drew Meekins	
2025–2026	Otono Porteno by Astor Piazzolla performed by Nuevo Tango Ensamble choreo. by Dmitry Chaplin	Music by John Miles choreo. by Drew Meekins	

== Competitive highlights ==
- GP – Event of the ISU Grand Prix Series
- CS – Event of the ISU Challenger Series
- TBD – Assigned
- WD – Withdrew from competition

=== Pair skating with Lachlan Lewer ===
Competition placements at senior level
Season	2024–25	2025–26	2026–27
U.S. Championships	6th	9th	
GP Finland	8th		
GP NHK Trophy			TBD
CS John Nicks Pairs Challenge	11th	10th	7th
CS Nebelhorn Trophy			10th
Tayside Trophy	3rd		4th

Competition placements at junior level
Season	2022–23	2023–24	2024–25	2025–26
World Junior Championships	7th	3rd	9th	
U.S. Championships	2nd	2nd		
JGP Latvia				3rd
JGP Poland				5th
Bavarian Open	1st			

== Detailed results ==
=== Pair skating with Lachlan Lewer ===
ISU personal best scores in the +5/-5 GOE System
Segment	Type	Score	Event
Total	TSS	159.63	2025 JGP Latvia
Short program	TSS	61.56	2026 John Nicks Challenge
Short program	TES	34.16	2026 John Nicks Challenge
Short program	PCS	27.40	2026 John Nicks Challenge
Free skating	TSS	101.50	2025 JGP Latvia
Free skating	TES	52.79	2024 Finlandia Trophy
Free skating	PCS	53.22	2025 JGP Latvia

==== Senior level ====
Results in the 2024–25 season
Date	Event	SP		FS		Total	
Date	Event	P	Score	P	Score	P	Score
Sep 3–4, 2024	(United States) 2024 CS John Nicks Pairs Competition	9	54.43	12	91.51	11	145.94
Oct 12–13, 2024	(United Kingdom) 2024 Tayside Trophy	6	46.00	3	109.46	3	155.46
Nov 15-17, 2024	(Finland) 2024 Finlandia Trophy	7	52.30	8	101.04	8	153.34
Jan 20–26, 2025	(United States) 2025 U.S. Championships	7	58.90	7	107.18	6	166.08

Results in the 2025–26 season
Date	Event	SP		FS		Total	
Date	Event	P	Score	P	Score	P	Score
Sep 2–3, 2025	(United States) 2025 CS John Nicks International Pairs Competition	10	53.22	10	94.92	10	148.14
Jan 4–11, 2026	(United States) 2026 U.S. Championships	9	55.09	9	97.77	9	152.86

Results in the 2026–27 season
Date	Event	SP		FS		Total	
Date	Event	P	Score	P	Score	P	Score
Sep 11–12, 2026	(United States) 2026 John Nicks Challenge	6	61.56	7	91.30	7	152.86
Sep 24–26, 2026	(Germany) 2026 CS Nebelhorn Trophy	9	53.91	8	95.88	10	149.79
Oct 10–11, 2026	(United Kingdom) 2026 Tayside Trophy	3	58.80	6	91.06	4	149.86

==== Junior level ====
Results in the 2022–23 season
Date	Event	SP		FS		Total	
Date	Event	P	Score	P	Score	P	Score
Jan 23–29, 2023	(United States) 2023 U.S. Championships (Junior)	2	56.79	2	92.04	2	148.83
Jan 31 – Feb 5, 2023	(Germany) 2023 Bavarian Open	1	52.01	2	84.22	1	136.23
Feb 27 – Mar 5, 2023	(Canada) 2023 World Junior Championships	7	52.13	7	92.92	7	145.05

Results in the 2023–24 season
Date	Event	SP		FS		Total	
Date	Event	P	Score	P	Score	P	Score
Jan 22–28, 2024	(United States) 2024 U.S. Championships (Junior)	3	48.64	2	102.60	2	151.24
Feb 26 – Mar 3, 2024	(Taiwan) 2024 World Junior Championships	4	55.37	4	90.63	3	146.00

Results in the 2024–25 season
Date	Event	SP		FS		Total	
Date	Event	P	Score	P	Score	P	Score
Feb 25 – Mar 2, 2025	(Hungary) 2025 World Junior Championships	9	50.95	6	95.91	9	146.86

Results in the 2025–26 season
Date	Event	SP		FS		Total	
Date	Event	P	Score	P	Score	P	Score
Aug 20–23, 2025	2025 JGP Latvia	3	58.13	2	101.50	3	159.63
Oct 1–4, 2025	2025 JGP Poland	3	54.88	6	91.32	5	146.20
