= Lachlan Lewer =

American pair skater (born 2003)

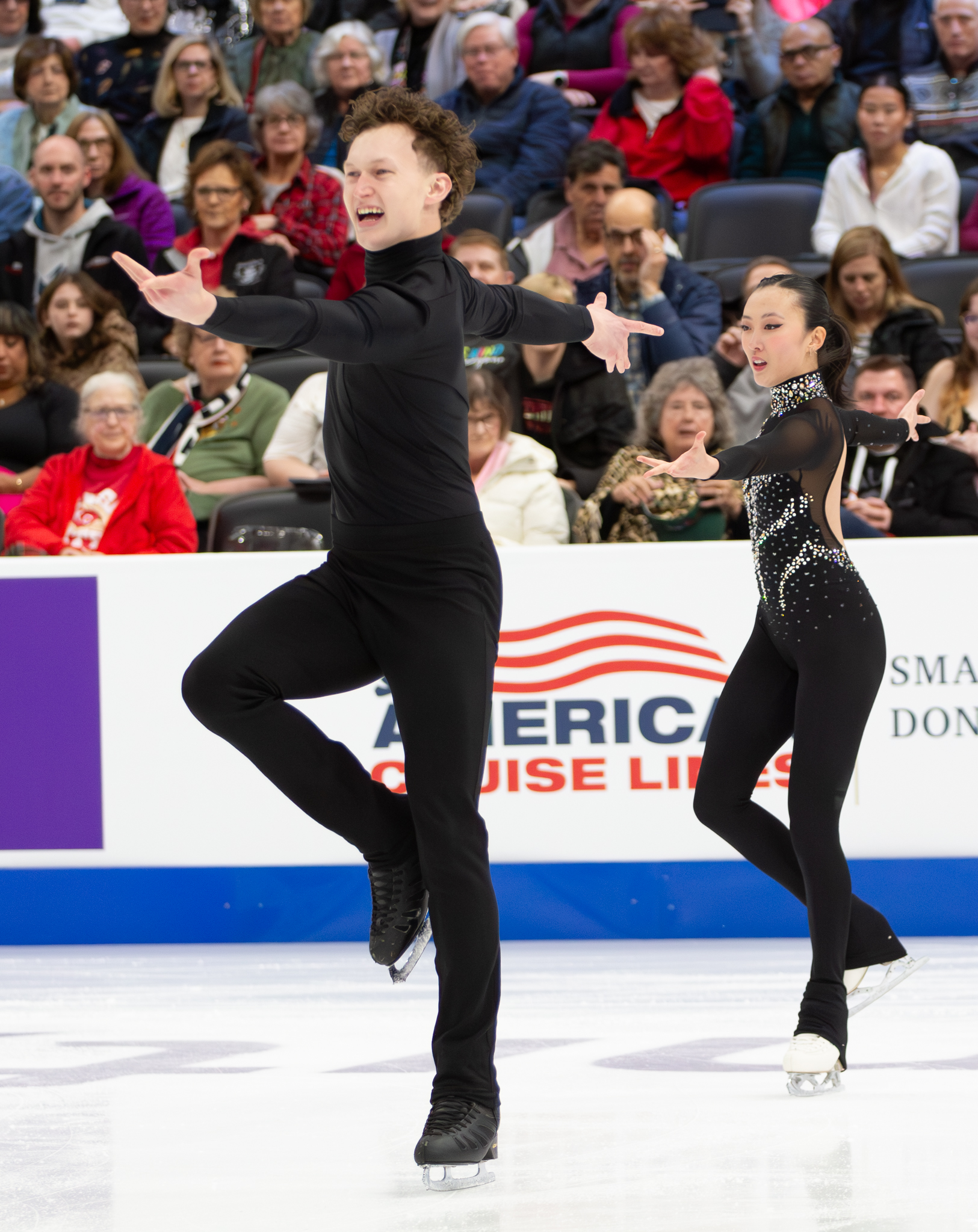
- Naomi Williams and Lachlan Lewer at the 2026 U.S. Championships

Personal information
- Other names: Lachlan Lewer-Parr
- Born: January 28, 2003 (age 23) Herston, Australia
- Home town: Brisbane, Australia
- Height: 6 ft 3 in (1.91 m)

Figure skating career
- Country: United States (since 2022); Australia (2021–22)
- Discipline: Pair skating
- Partner: Naomi Williams (since 2022); Campbell Young (2021–22)
- Coach: Drew Meekins; Natalia Mishkutenok; Eddie Shipstad
- Skating club: Boondall FISC
- Began skating: 2006

Medal record
Representing United States
World Junior Championships
Bronze medal – third place	2024 Taipei	Pairs

Lachlan Lewer-Parr (born January 28, 2003) is an Australian-born pair skater who competes with Naomi Williams for the United States. With Williams, he is the 2024 World Junior bronze medalist and a two-time U.S. junior national silver medalist (2023–24).

== Personal life ==
Lewer was born on January 28, 2003 in Brisbane, Australia to parents, Gabrielle and Matt. He also has an older sister, Theresa. He has expressed becoming a figure skating coach and a firefighter after he finishes his competitive figure skating career.

== Career ==
=== Early career ===
Lewer began figure skating in 2006 at the age of three. He originally trained at the Boondall Figure Ice Skating Club in Brisbane, where he was coached by Elizabeth Cain and Sean Carlow.

Eventually deciding to pursue pair skating, Lewer moved to Colorado Springs, Colorado in 2020, where he began training under Drew Meekins. For the 2021–22 figure skating season, he teamed up with American pair skater, Campbell Young. Representing Australia, the team competed on the 2021–22 ISU Challenger Series, finishing eighteenth at the 2021 Warsaw Cup and seventeenth at the 2021 Golden Spin of Zagreb. The team also won gold at the 2021 Ice Challenge and on the junior level, bronze at the 2022 Icelab International Cup. Their partnership eventually dissolved after the season finished.

=== Partnership with Williams for the United States ===
==== 2022–2023 season: Debut of Williams/Lewer ====
In August 2022, Lewer teamed up with American singles skater, Naomi Williams. It was soon announced that the team would represent the United States and train in Colorado Springs, Colorado, under coaches, Drew Meekins and Natalia Mishkutenok.

The pair debuted at the 2023 Midwestern Sectional Championships, where they won the silver medal on the junior level. They subsequently won the silver medal at the 2023 U.S. Junior Championships and the gold medal on the junior level of the 2023 Bavarian Open.

Selected to represent the United States at the 2023 World Junior Championships, the pair came in seventh place.

==== 2023–2024 season: World Junior bronze ====
Although initially assigned to compete on the 2023–24 ISU Junior Grand Prix, Williams/Lewer were forced to miss entire series after Williams tore a ligament in her ankle that required surgery. After six weeks off the ice, Williams returned to training in late October. They made their return to competition at the 2024 U.S. Junior Championships, winning silver for a second consecutive time.

Willis/Lewer then competed at the 2024 World Junior Championships, winning the bronze medal. “I am so happy and proud of what we have done after all we have been through,” said Williams. “It was a really rough time this season.

==== 2024–2025 season ====
Debuting on the senior international level, Williams/Lewer started the season by finishing eleventh at the 2024 John Nicks International Pairs Competition and winning bronze at the 2024 Tayside Trophy.

Given one ISU senior Grand Prix assignment, the team competed at the 2024 Finlandia Trophy, where they came in eighth place.

In January, Williams/Lewer made their senior national debut at the 2025 U.S. Championships in Wichita, Kansas, coming in sixth place. Selected to compete at the 2025 World Junior Championships in Debrecen, Hungary, the pair closed the season by finishing that event in ninth place.

==== 2025–2026 season: Junior Grand Prix medal ====
In August, Williams/Lewer started the season by competing on the 2025–26 ISU Junior Grand Prix series, winning the bronze medal at 2025 JGP Latvia and fifth at 2025 JGP Poland. They were ultimately named as the first alternates for the 2025–26 Junior Grand Prix Final. Between their two Junior Grand Prix events, Williams/Lewer also competed on the senior level at the 2025 CS John Nicks International Pairs Competition, where they finished in tenth place.

In January, Williams/Lewer competed at the 2026 U.S. Championships, where they finished in ninth place.

==== 2026–2027 season ====
The pair opened the new season by placing seventh at the 2026 John Nicks Challenge.

== Programs ==
=== Pair skating with Naomi Williams (for the United States) ===
Season	Short program	Free skating	Exhibition
2022–2023	Tiny Dancer by Elton John performed by Florence and the Machine choreo. by Drew Meekins	Miss Saigon by Claude-Michel Schönberg performed by Bournemouth Symphony Orchestra choreo. by Drew Meekins	
2023–2024	Joli garçon by Pink Martini choreo. by Drew Meekins	Miss Saigon by Claude-Michel Schönberg performed by Bournemouth Symphony Orchestra choreo. by Drew Meekins	One Way or Another by Blondie
2024–2025	Joli garçon by Pink Martini choreo. by Drew Meekins	Eleanor Rigby by The Beatles performed by Cody Fry choreo. by Drew Meekins	
2025–2026	Otono Porteno by Astor Piazzolla performed by Nuevo Tango Ensamble choreo. by Dmitry Chaplin	Music by John Miles choreo. by Drew Meekins	

=== Pair skating with Campbell Young (for Australia) ===
Season	Short program	Free skating
2022–2023	Dream On by Aerosmith performed by Blacktop Mojo choreo. by Drew Meekins	Wedding Vow (from Romeo & Juliet) by Abel Korzeniowski choreo. by Drew Meekins

== Competitive highlights ==
- GP – Event of the ISU Grand Prix Series
- CS – Event of the ISU Challenger Series
- TBD – Assigned
- WD – Withdrew from competition

=== Pair skating with Naomi Williams (for the United States) ===
Competition placements at senior level
Season	2024–25	2025–26	2026–27
U.S. Championships	6th	9th	
GP Finland	8th		
GP NHK Trophy			TBD
CS John Nicks	11th	10th	7th
CS Nebelhorn Trophy			10th
Tayside Trophy	3rd		4th

Competition placements at junior level
Season	2022–23	2023–24	2024–25	2025–26
World Junior Championships	7th	3rd	9th	
U.S. Championships	2nd	2nd		
JGP Latvia				3rd
JGP Poland				5th
Bavarian Open	1st			

=== Pair skating with Campbell Young (for Australia) ===
Competition placements at senior level
Season	2021–22
CS Golden Spin of Zagreb	17th
CS Warsaw Cup	18th
Ice Challenge	1st

Competition placements at junior level
Season	2021–22
Bavarian Open	7th
Ice Challenge	2nd
IceLab Cup	3rd

== Detailed results ==
=== Pair skating with Naomi Williams (for the United States) ===
ISU personal best scores in the +5/-5 GOE System
Segment	Type	Score	Event
Total	TSS	159.63	2025 JGP Latvia
Short program	TSS	61.56	2026 John Nicks Challenge
Short program	TES	34.16	2026 John Nicks Challenge
Short program	PCS	27.40	2026 John Nicks Challenge
Free skating	TSS	101.50	2025 JGP Latvia
Free skating	TES	52.79	2024 Finlandia Trophy
Free skating	PCS	53.22	2025 JGP Latvia

==== Senior level ====
Results in the 2024–25 season
Date	Event	SP		FS		Total	
Date	Event	P	Score	P	Score	P	Score
Sep 3–4, 2024	(United States) 2024 CS John Nicks Pairs Competition	9	54.43	12	91.51	11	145.94
Oct 12–13, 2024	(United Kingdom) 2024 Tayside Trophy	6	46.00	3	109.46	3	155.46
Nov 15-17, 2024	(Finland) 2024 Finlandia Trophy	7	52.30	8	101.04	8	153.34
Jan 20–26, 2025	(United States) 2025 U.S. Championships	7	58.90	7	107.18	6	166.08

Results in the 2025–26 season
Date	Event	SP		FS		Total	
Date	Event	P	Score	P	Score	P	Score
Sep 2–3, 2025	(United States) 2025 CS John Nicks International Pairs Competition	10	53.22	10	94.92	10	148.14
Jan 4–11, 2026	(United States) 2026 U.S. Championships	9	55.09	9	97.77	9	152.86

Results in the 2026–27 season
Date	Event	SP		FS		Total	
Date	Event	P	Score	P	Score	P	Score
Sep 11–12, 2026	(United States) 2026 John Nicks Challenge	6	61.56	7	91.30	7	152.86
Sep 24–26, 2026	(Germany) 2026 CS Nebelhorn Trophy	9	53.91	8	95.88	10	149.79
Oct 10–11, 2026	(United Kingdom) 2026 Tayside Trophy	3	58.80	6	91.06	4	149.86

==== Junior level ====
Results in the 2022–23 season
Date	Event	SP		FS		Total	
Date	Event	P	Score	P	Score	P	Score
Jan 23–29, 2023	(United States) 2023 U.S. Championships (Junior)	2	56.79	2	92.04	2	148.83
Jan 31 – Feb 5, 2023	(Germany) 2023 Bavarian Open	1	52.01	2	84.22	1	136.23
Feb 27 – Mar 5, 2023	(Canada) 2023 World Junior Championships	7	52.13	7	92.92	7	145.05

Results in the 2023–24 season
Date	Event	SP		FS		Total	
Date	Event	P	Score	P	Score	P	Score
Jan 22–28, 2024	(United States) 2024 U.S. Championships (Junior)	3	48.64	2	102.60	2	151.24
Feb 26 – Mar 3, 2024	(Taiwan) 2024 World Junior Championships	4	55.37	4	90.63	3	146.00

Results in the 2024–25 season
Date	Event	SP		FS		Total	
Date	Event	P	Score	P	Score	P	Score
Feb 25 – Mar 2, 2025	(Hungary) 2025 World Junior Championships	9	50.95	6	95.91	9	146.86

Results in the 2025–26 season
Date	Event	SP		FS		Total	
Date	Event	P	Score	P	Score	P	Score
Aug 20–23, 2025	2025 JGP Latvia	3	58.13	2	101.50	3	159.63
Oct 1–4, 2025	2025 JGP Poland	3	54.88	6	91.32	5	146.20
