= Drew Meekins =

American pairs skater and choreographer (born 1985)

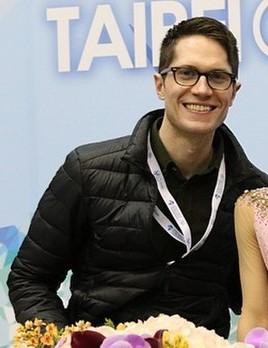
- Meekins at the 2017 World Junior Championships

Personal information
- Full name: Andrew Meekins
- Born: April 10, 1985 (age 41) Juneau, Alaska
- Home town: Wellesley, Massachusetts
- Height: 5 ft 10 in (1.78 m)

Figure skating career
- Country: United States
- Coach: Dalilah Sappenfield; Laureano Ibarra
- Skating club: Skating Club of Boston

Drew Meekins (born April 10, 1985) is an American retired pairs skater, coach, and choreographer. With former partner Julia Vlassov, he is the 2006 World Junior Champion.

== Personal life and family ==
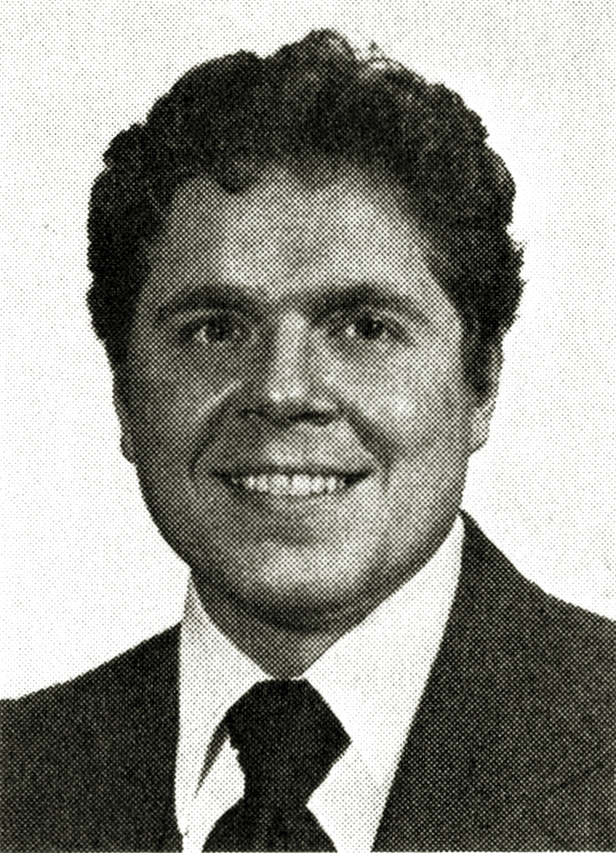
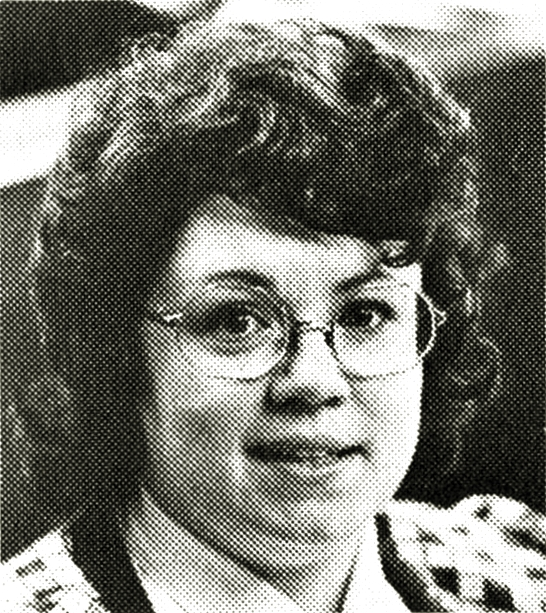
Drew's father, Russ Meekins, Jr., and aunt, Susan Meekins Sullivan, as Alaska state legislators in the mid 1970s.

Andrew Meekins, known as "Drew", was born in Juneau, Alaska on April 10, 1985. He is one of five children (four sons and one daughter) born to Edward Russell "Russ" Meekins, Jr. (1949–2020) and his wife Nancy Harvey. All four of his grandparents moved to Anchorage, Alaska from the Northeastern United States during the tail end of World War II and were active in business and civic affairs in Anchorage throughout the middle and late 20th century. His father, his aunt Susan Sullivan, and his grandfather Russ Meekins Sr. all served in the Alaska State Legislature as Democrats representing Anchorage. His father, the only one of the three to serve more than one term, was the House's majority leader in his last term (1981–1983). In that term, he played a key role in two events which rank amongst the most significant in the history of the Alaska Legislature: the mid-session overthrow of the Democratic House leadership and its replacement with a multi-party coalition, and the bribery conviction and subsequent expulsion of a member of the Alaska Senate. As a result of the fallout from these events, he soon found himself on the outs with Alaska's political establishment. The family left Alaska ca. 1990 and moved to Massachusetts, the home state of Nancy Harvey's parents, settling on Cape Cod. One of his brothers, Cam Meekins, is a rapper.

Meekins is openly gay.

== Skating career ==
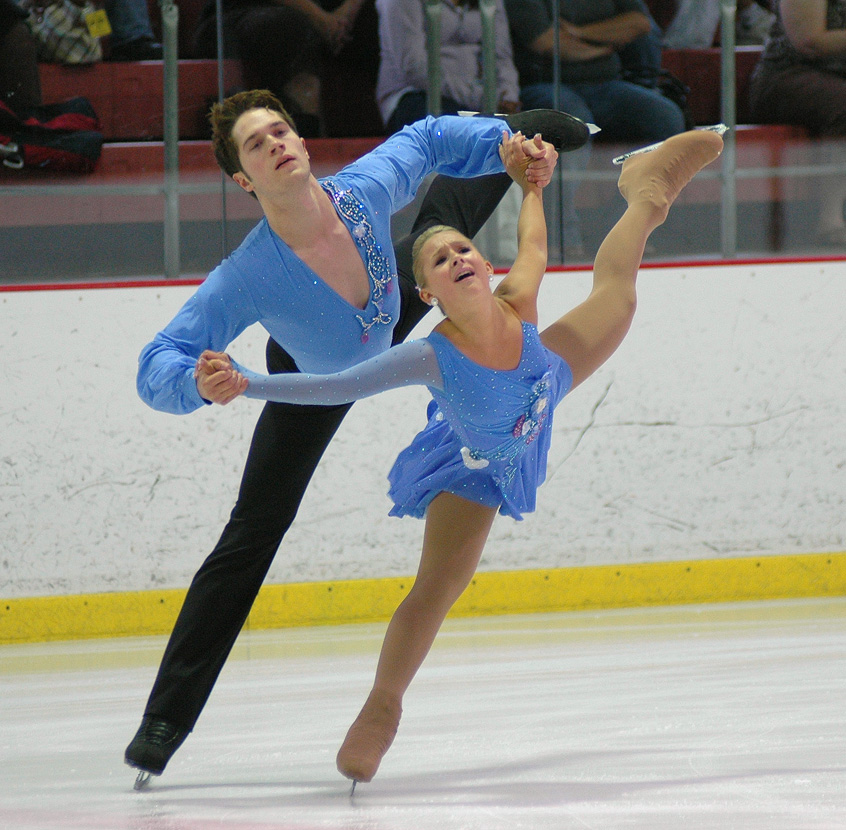
Drew Meekins with Jessica Rose Paetsch in 2008

Meekins and Vlassov won the 2006 World Junior Championships. In their first season of senior international competition, they won the silver at the Nebelhorn Trophy, placed sixth at the 2006 Cup of China, and placed fifth at the 2006 NHK Trophy. Vlassov and Meekins finished in seventh place in their senior debut at the 2007 U.S. Championships. They were fifth in the free program.

Vlassov and Meekins were assigned to two Grand Prix events for the 2007–2008 season; however, they were forced to withdraw from the 2007 Skate Canada International before the event began due to an injury to Meekins's shoulder which occurred during an attempted lift in practice. Vlassov and Meekins announced the end of their partnership on November 8, 2007.

U.S. Figure Skating announced on July 14, 2008, that Meekins had teamed up with Jessica Rose Paetsch. Paetsch and Meekins placed tenth at the 2009 U.S. Championships.

After qualifying for the 2010 U.S. Championships, Paetsch & Meekins announced the end of their partnership in December 2009.

== Coaching career ==
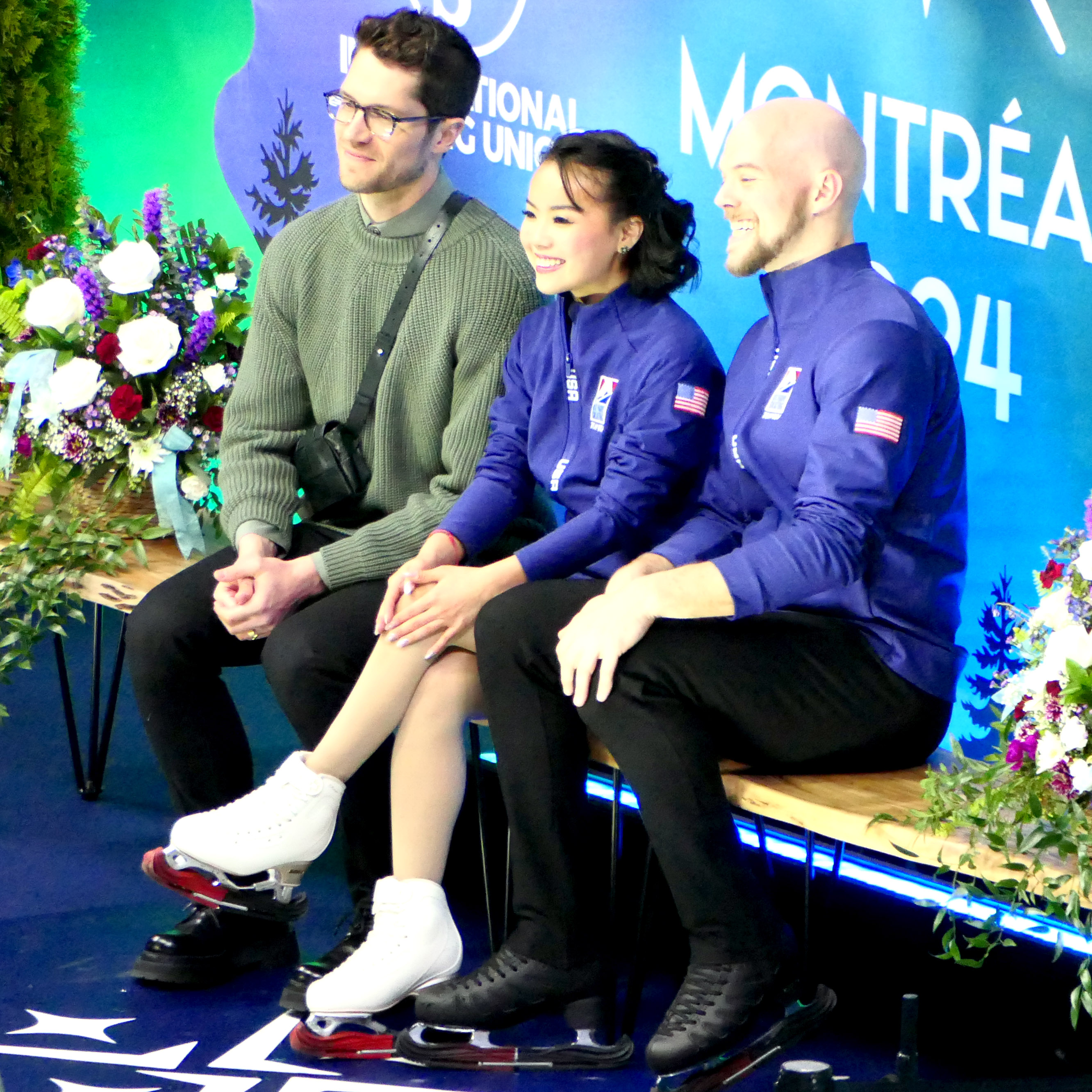
Meekins (left) with students Ellie Kam/Danny O’Shea at the 2024 World Championships

Meekins is now a figure skating coach and choreographer at the Broadmoor World Arena in Colorado Springs, Colorado, and coaches a wide range of skaters and offers virtual lessons and other resources on his website.

As a coach, his students have included:

- Nica Digerness / Mark Sadusky
- Olivia Flores / Luke Wang
- Hannah Herrera / Ivan Khobta
- Pauline Irman / Benjamin Jalovick
- Ellie Kam / Danny O’Shea
- Milada Kovar / Jared McPike
- Elyce Lin-Gracey
- Naomi Williams / Lachlan Lewer
- Campbell Young / Lachlan Lewer
- Miyu Yunoki / Tristan Taylor
- Vincent Zhou

As a choreographer, his clients have included:

- Karen Chen
- Olivia Flores / Luke Wang
- Sofia Frank
- Hannah Herrera / Ivan Khobta
- Logan Higase-Chen
- Ji Seo-yeon
- Ellie Kam / Danny O’Shea
- Phattaratida Kaneshige
- Jari Kessler
- Kim Ye-lim
- Elyce Lin-Gracey
- Mirai Nagasu
- Naoki Rossi
- Clare Seo
- Audrey Shin
- Audrey Shin / Balázs Nagy
- Naomi Williams / Lachlan Lewer
- Campbell Young / Lachlan Lewer
- You Young
- Vincent Zhou

== Programs ==
(with Vlassov)

Season	Short program	Free skating
2007–2008	Malaguena by Ernesto Lecuona	Titanic Symphony by Richard Clayderman
2006–2007	Leelo's Tune; Sarabande by Maksim Mrvica	Warsaw Concerto performed by Richard Clayderman
2005–2006	Picante by Vanessa Mae	Paychek (soundtrack) by John Powell
2004–2005	Picante by Vanessa Mae	Paychek (soundtrack) by John Powell
2003–2004	Beethoven's 5th	Mission Impossible; Pink Panther

== Competitive highlights ==
=== With Paetsch ===
Event	2008–2009	2009–2010
U.S. Championships	10th	

=== With Vlassov ===
Event	2004–05	2005–06	2006–07
World Junior Championships	9th	1st	
U.S. Championships	2nd J.	3rd J.	7th
Cup of China			6th
NHK Trophy			5th
Nebelhorn Trophy			2nd
Junior Grand Prix Final	4th	2nd	
Junior Grand Prix, Croatia		3rd	
Junior Grand Prix, Andorra		2nd	
Junior Grand Prix, Ukraine	3rd		
Junior Grand Prix, Belgrade	1st		
