= Luke Wang =

American pair skater (born 2004)

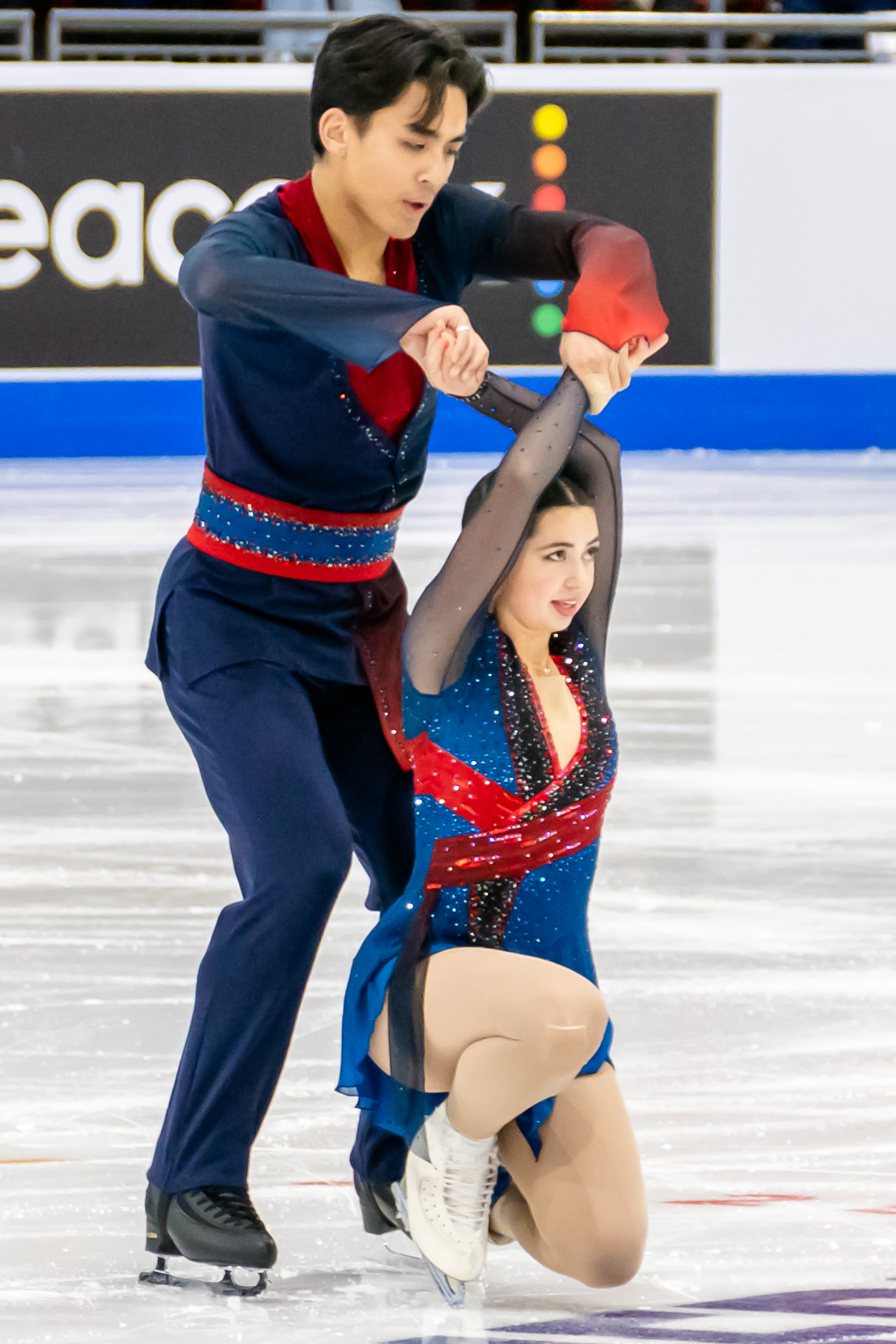
- Wang with Olivia Flores at 2025 Skate America

Personal information
- Born: March 9, 2004 (age 22) Baltimore, Maryland, U.S.
- Home town: Ellicott City, Maryland, U.S.
- Height: 5 ft 10 in (1.77 m)

Figure skating career
- Country: United States
- Discipline: Pair skating Men's singles
- Partner: Olivia Flores
- Coach: Drew Meekins; Natalia Mishkutenok; Eddie Shipstad
- Skating club: Los Angeles Figure Skating Club
- Began skating: 2012

Medal record
World Junior Championships
Silver medal – second place	2024 Taipei	Pairs
Junior Grand Prix Final
Silver medal – second place	2024–25 Grenoble	Pairs

Luke Wang (born March 9, 2004) is an American figure skater and competes in both single skating and pair skating. With his former partner Olivia Flores, he is the 2024 World Junior silver medalist, the 2024–25 Junior Grand Prix Final silver medalist, the 2023 JGP Austria silver medalist, the 2023 JGP Turkey silver medalist and the 2024 U.S. junior national champion.

== Personal life ==
Wang was born on March 9, 2004 in Baltimore, Maryland, United States. He enjoys creative outlets such as videography, photography, playing the piano, and playing the cello in his free time.

== Career ==
Wang began skating at age eight after trying it at a birthday party, as well as later watching an annual ice show at one of his previous figure skating club and being mesmerized by it. In addition to pair skating, he competes in men's singles. He competed in singles at the 2024 U.S. Championships before withdrawing after the short program to focus on preparing for his pairs competition.

== Partnership with Flores ==
=== 2022–23 season: Junior international debut ===
Coached by Drew Meekins and Natalia Mishkutenok in Colorado Springs, Colorado, Wang partnered with Flores in June 2022. During their first season together, they won the Cup of Colorado, placed fourth at the USA Midwestern sectionals, and went to the U.S. Figure Skating Championships, where they also finished in fourth place. They won their first international competition, the International Challenge Cup, during their debut season as well.

=== 2023–24 season: World Junior silver ===
Flores and Wang competed at the Glacier Falls Summer Classic, where they placed second. They made their Junior Grand Prix debut at the 2023 JGP Austria, where they finished in second place. They also placed second at their second Junior Grand Prix assignment, the 2023 JGP Turkey, which qualified them for the Junior Grand Prix Final, where they placed fifth.

At their second nationals, they won both the short program and free skate segments and won the gold medal by 24.47 points. They were selected for the World Junior team, where they won the silver medal. "I think our entire work we put in this season came together with this medal," said Wang. "It also shows how much we improved over the season." In an interview where they recapped their season, they said their motto is: “Liv, Laugh, Luke.”

=== 2024–25 season: Junior Grand Prix Final silver ===
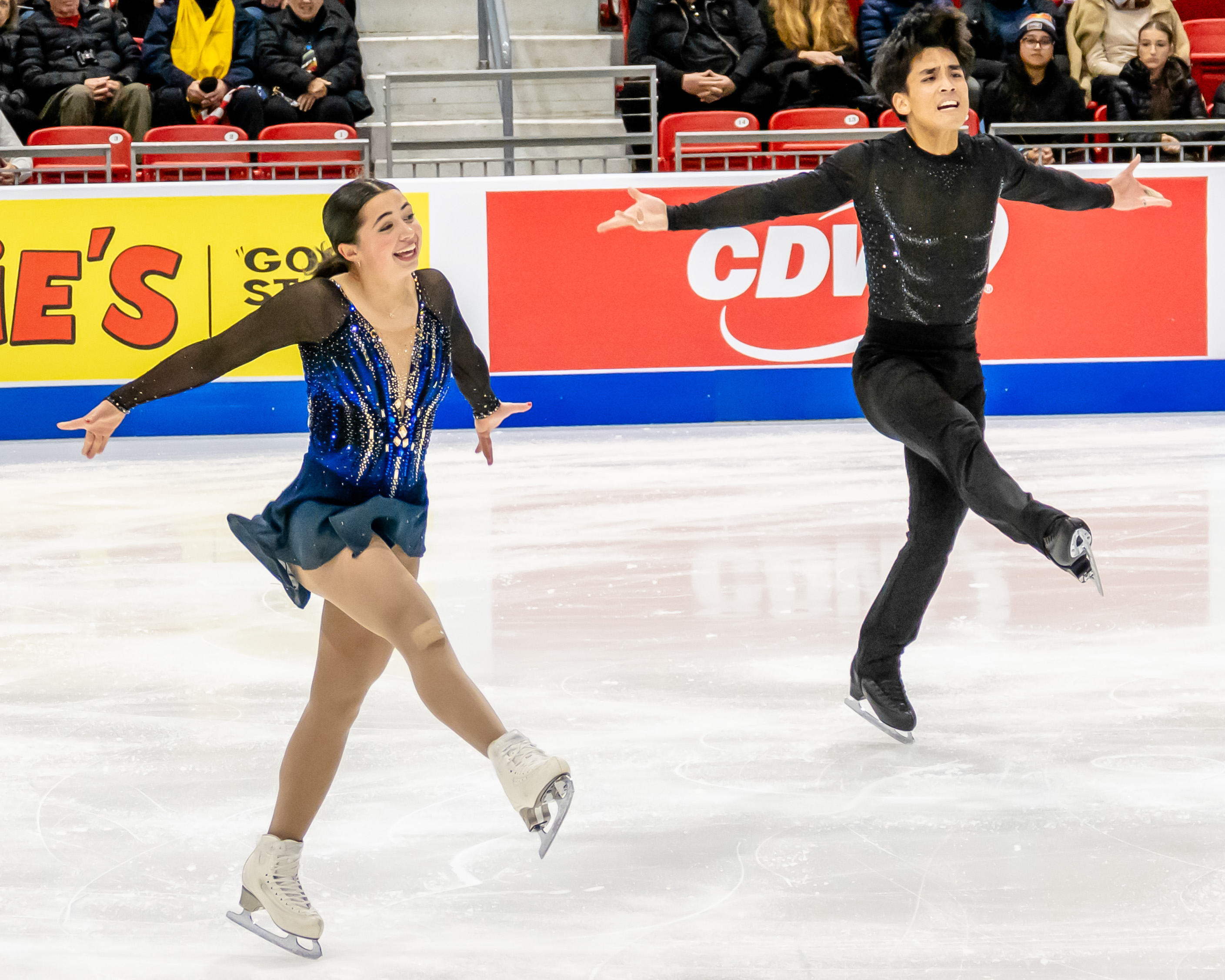
Flores and Wang during their short program at the 2025 Skate America

Flores/Wang competed in the Junior Grand Prix series in Riga and Ankara where they placed third and second respectively, earning a berth at the Junior Grand Prix Final in Grenoble, France. At the Final, they won the silver medal behind Zhang/Huang of China.

In January, Flores/Wang competed at the 2025 U.S. Junior Championships in Wichita, Kansas, winning the silver medal behind Moss/Galbavy. Selected to compete at the 2025 World Junior Championships the following month in Debrecen, Hungary, the pair finished in sixth place.

=== 2025–26 season ===
Making their senior international debut, Flores/Wang opened the season by placing twelfth at the 2025 CS John Nicks International Pairs Competition. Selected as host picks, the team made their senior Grand Prix series debut at 2025 Skate America, where they finished in eighth place.

In January, Flores/Wang made their senior national debut at the 2026 U.S. Championships, where they finished in seventh place. They were subsequently named to the 2026 World Junior Championships teams.

On April 13, 2026, Wang announced the end of his partnership with Flores.

== Programs ==
=== Pair skating with Olivia Flores ===
Season	Short program	Free skate	Exhibition	Ref.
2022–23	Once Upon A December From Anastasia Performed by Christy Altomare Choreo. by Drew Meekins, Natalia Mishkutenok, & Isabella Flores	Music from The Chronicles of Narnia By Harry Gregson-Williams Choreo. by Drew Meekins	—N/a	
2023–24	Once Upon A December From Anastasia Performed by Christy Altomare Choreo. by Drew Meekins, Natalia Mishkutenok, & Isabella Flores	The Force Theme; Rey's Theme By Samuel Kim Music arrangement & composition by Hugo Chouinard & Luke Wang Choreo. by Drew Meekins & Natalia Mishkutenok	Wake Me Up Before You Go-Go By Wham!	
2024–25	Golden Slumbers/Carry That Weight From Sing By Jennifer Hudson Choreo. by Drew Meekins	The Lion King; Spirit By Beyoncé; The Lion King Orchestra Suite By Hans Zimmer Choreo. by Drew Meekins		
2025–26	Run to You From The Bodyguard By Whitney Houston Arranged by Karl Hugo Choreo. by Drew Meekins	Crouching Tiger, Hidden Dragon By Tan Dun Arranged by Karl Hugo Choreo. by Drew Meekins		

== Competitive highlights ==
=== Pair skating with Olivia Flores ===
- GP – Event of the ISU Grand Prix Series
- JGP – Event of the ISU Junior Grand Prix Series
- TBD – Assigned
- WD – Withdrew from competition

Competition placements at senior level
Season	2025–26
U.S. Championships	7th
GP Skate America	8th
CS John Nicks Pairs	12th

Competition placements at junior level
Season	2022–23	2023–24	2024–25	2025–26
World Junior Championships		2nd	6th	5th
Junior Grand Prix Final		5th	2nd	
U.S. Championships	4th	1st	2nd	
JGP Austria		2nd		
JGP Latvia			3rd	
JGP Turkey		2nd	2nd	
Bavarian Open				2nd
Challenge Cup	1st			

== Detailed results ==
=== Pair skating with Olivia Flores ===
ISU personal best scores in the +5/-5 GOE System
Segment	Type	Score	Event
Total	TSS	166.89	2024 World Junior Championships
Short program	TSS	62.33	2024 World Junior Championships
Short program	TES	35.79	2024 World Junior Championships
Short program	PCS	26.54	2024 World Junior Championships
Free skating	TSS	105.00	2023 JGP Turkey
Free skating	TES	52.42	2025 Skate America
Free skating	PCS	54.16	2024 World Junior Championships

- Small medals for the short program and free skating are only awarded at ISU Championships.
- At national events in the United States, pewter medals are awarded for fourth place.

==== Senior level ====
Results in the 2025–26 season
Date	Event	SP		FS		Total	
Date	Event	P	Score	P	Score	P	Score
Sep 2–3, 2025	(United States) 2025 CS John Nicks International Pairs Competition	11	45.01	12	77.65	12	122.66
Nov 14–16, 2025	(United States) 2025 Skate America	8	55.83	8	105.61	8	161.44
Jan 4–11, 2026	(United States) 2026 U.S. Championships	6	63.58	8	112.28	7	175.86

==== Junior level ====
Results in the 2022–23 season
Date	Event	SP		FS		Total	
Date	Event	P	Score	P	Score	P	Score
Jan 23–29, 2023	(United States) 2023 U.S. Championships (Junior)	4	46.31	3	76.78	4	123.09
Feb 23–26, 2023	(Netherlands) 2023 International Challenge Cup	1	51.01	2	75.13	1	126.14

Results in the 2023–24 season
Date	Event	SP		FS		Total	
Date	Event	P	Score	P	Score	P	Score
Aug 30 – Sep 2, 2023	2023 JGP Austria	2	52.02	2	95.20	2	147.22
Sep 6–9, 2023	2023 JGP Turkey	3	49.52	2	105.00	2	154.52
Dec 7–10, 2023	(China) 2023–24 Junior Grand Prix Final	5	54.37	6	91.02	5	145.39
Jan 22–28, 2024	(United States) 2024 U.S. Championships (Junior)	1	59.83	1	115.88	1	175.71
Feb 26 – Mar 3, 2024	(Taiwan) 2024 World Junior Championships	2	62.33	2	104.56	2	166.89

Results in the 2024–25 season
Date	Event	SP		FS		Total	
Date	Event	P	Score	P	Score	P	Score
Aug 28–31, 2024	2024 JGP Latvia	2	54.38	4	85.13	3	139.51
Sep 18–21, 2024	2024 JGP Turkey	2	54.93	2	92.87	2	147.80
Dec 5–8, 2024	(France) 2024–25 Junior Grand Prix Final	3	52.04	2	103.78	2	155.82
Jan 20–26, 2025	(United States) 2025 U.S. Championships (Junior)	2	55.78	2	96.42	2	152.20
Feb 25 – Mar 2, 2025	(Hungary) 2025 World Junior Championships	8	51.02	5	97.38	6	148.40

Results in the 2025–26 season
Date	Event	SP		FS		Total	
Date	Event	P	Score	P	Score	P	Score
Jan 27 – Feb 1, 2026	(Germany) 2026 Bavarian Open	1	55.90	3	95.99	2	151.89
Mar 3–8, 2026	(Estonia) 2026 World Junior Championships	4	57.96	5	92.03	5	149.99
