= Ellie Kam =

American pair skater (born 2004)

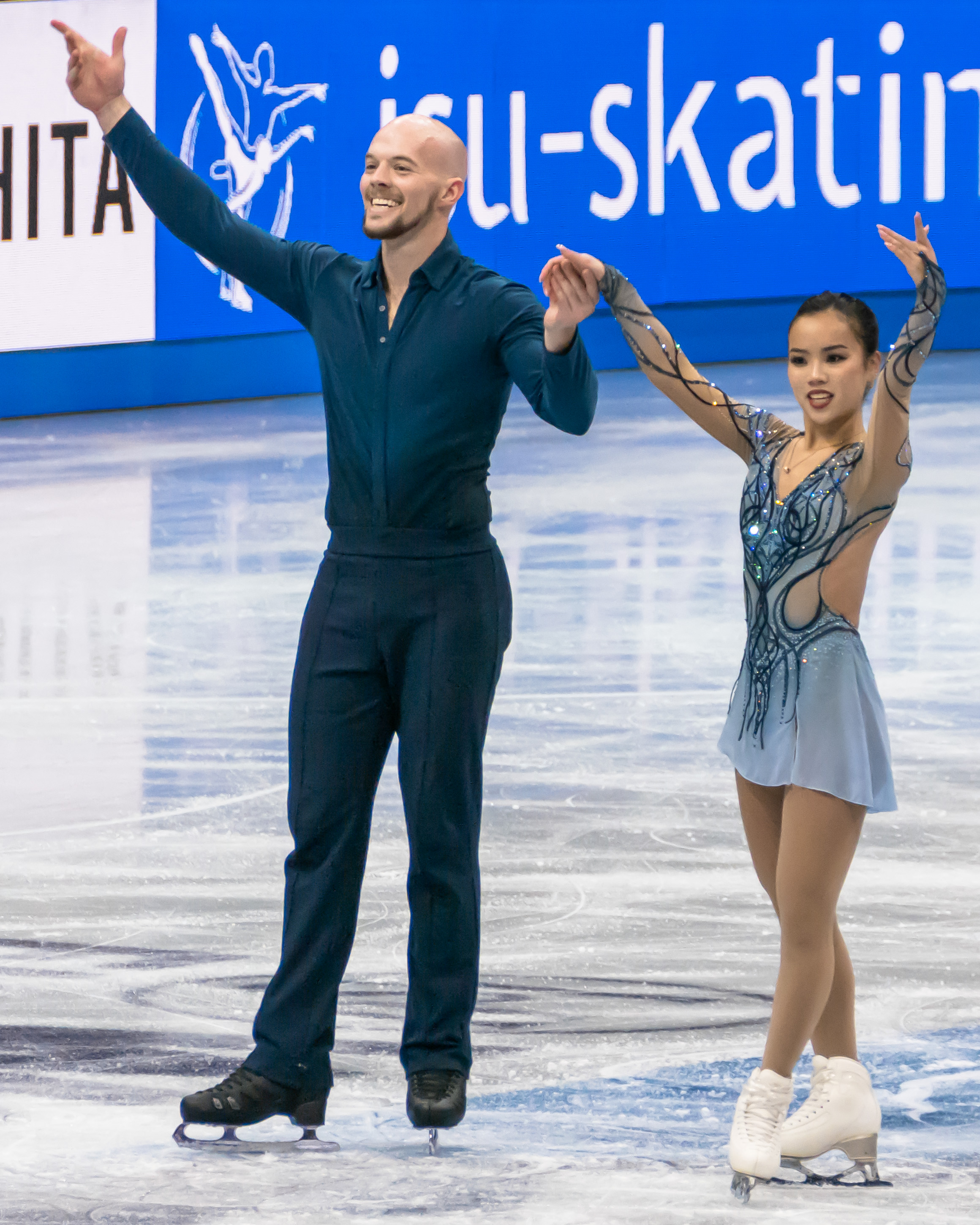
- Ellie Kam and Daniel O'Shea at the 2025 World Championships

Personal information
- Born: December 20, 2004 (age 21) Yokota Air Base, Japan
- Home town: Colorado Springs, Colorado, U.S.
- Height: 1.52 m (5 ft 0 in)

Figure skating career
- Country: United States
- Discipline: Pair skating
- Partner: Daniel O'Shea (since 2022); Ian Meyh (2021–22)
- Coach: Drew Meekins; Sandy Straub
- Skating club: Thunderbirds Figure Skating Club

Medal record
Olympic Games
Gold medal – first place	2026 Milano Cortina	Team
Four Continents Championships
Bronze medal – third place	2024 Shanghai	Pairs
U.S. Championships
Gold medal – first place	2024 Columbus	Pairs
Silver medal – second place	2026 St. Louis	Pairs
Bronze medal – third place	2023 San Jose	Pairs
Bronze medal – third place	2025 Wichita	Pairs

Ellie Wong Kam (born December 20, 2004) is an American pair skater. With her current skating partner, Danny O'Shea, she is a 2026 Olympic Games team event gold medalist, the 2024 Four Continents bronze medalist, four-time Grand Prix medalist, four-time Challenger Series medalist, and 2024 U.S. national champion.

== Personal life ==
Kam was born on 20 December 2004 in Yokota Air Base, Japan, to a Japanese mother, Mako, and an American father, Benjamin, who is of Japanese and Chinese descent. She also has two older brothers, Zane and Kai. At the time of Kam's birth, her father had been stationed in Japan due to his work as an Air Force surgeon. Following his assignment's completion, the family moved to Alaska before eventually settling in Colorado Springs, Colorado.

She is currently a student at the University of Colorado Colorado Springs, where she majors in health science. Moreover, Kam frequently aids in designing skating costumes for herself and her pairs partner, Daniel O'Shea.

== Skating career ==
=== Early years ===
Kam trained as a pairs skater for several years after switching from singles to pairs with partner Ian Meyh. In 2022, they qualified for the 2022 U.S. Junior Championships but subsequently withdrew. Their partnership ended in mid-2022, after they had competed twice at senior-level club competitions.

She later characterized her work with Meyh as “an amazing experience,” adding, “I learned everything, pairs-wise, with Ian.”

=== 2022–2023 season ===
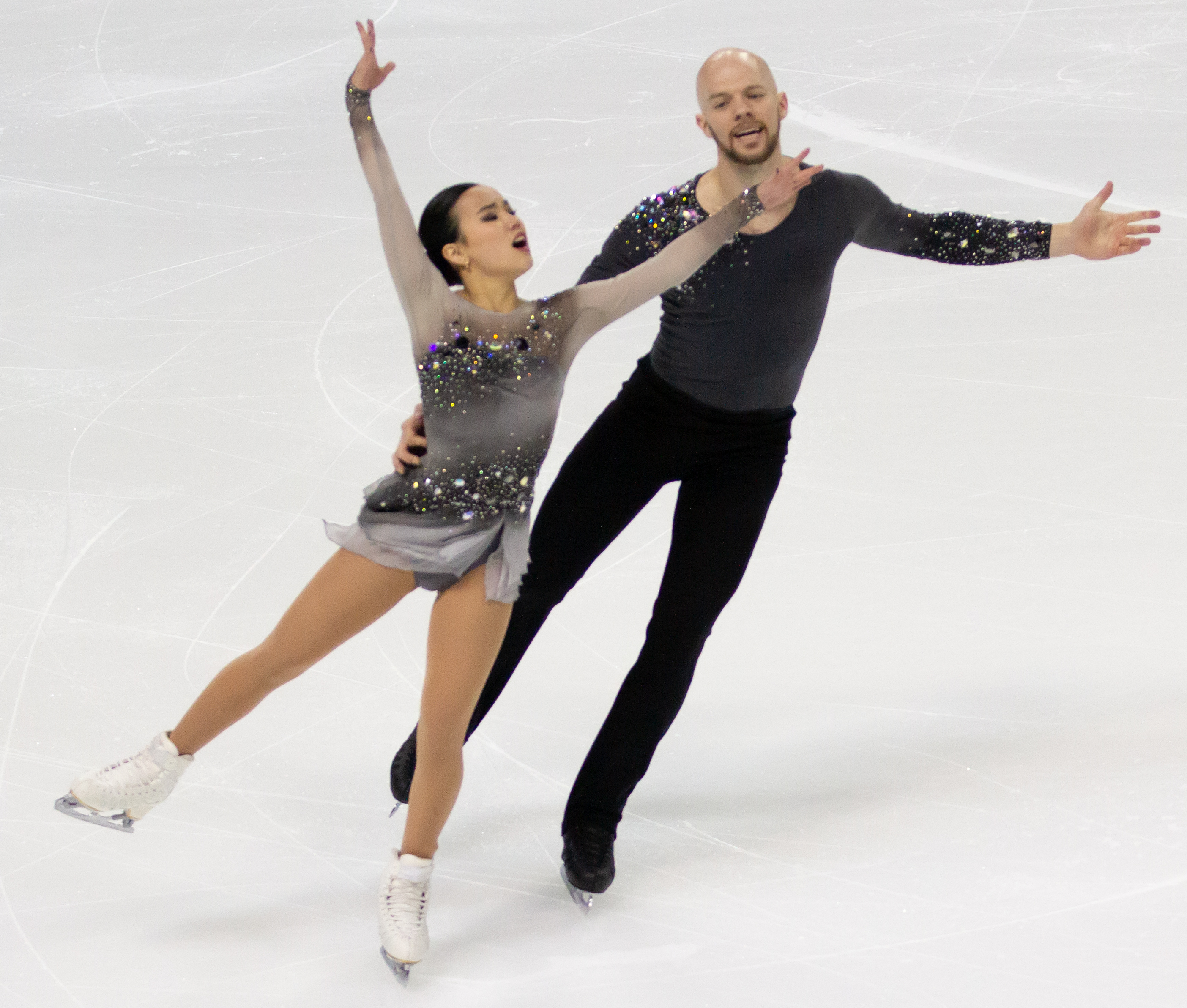
Kam/O'Shea at the 2023 Four Continents Championships

Kam formed a new partnership with veteran pair skater Danny O'Shea, who had previously been acting as an advisor at her camp. They had initially begun skating together at her coach's suggestion as a way to keep her skills practised. In the fall, they made their international debut at the 2022 Ice Challenge and won the gold medal in the pairs competition. They then made their Challenger debut at the 2022 CS Golden Spin of Zagreb, winning the silver medal.

Kam/O'Shea competed next at the 2023 U.S. Championships, where they placed third in the short program. They opened their free skate with Kam falling on their triple twist, but still managed to place third in that segment as well, winning the bronze medal. Kam called the experience "quite the whirlwind."

Having reached the national podium, Kam/O'Shea were assigned to make their ISU championship debut together at the 2023 Four Continents Championships, held in their home training location of Colorado Springs. O'Shea considered this "pretty special." They placed seventh in the short program, but a fifth-place free skate moved them up to sixth overall. Kam/O'Shea finished the season at the 2023 World Championships in Saitama, where they finished twelfth.

=== 2023–2024 season: Four Continents bronze ===
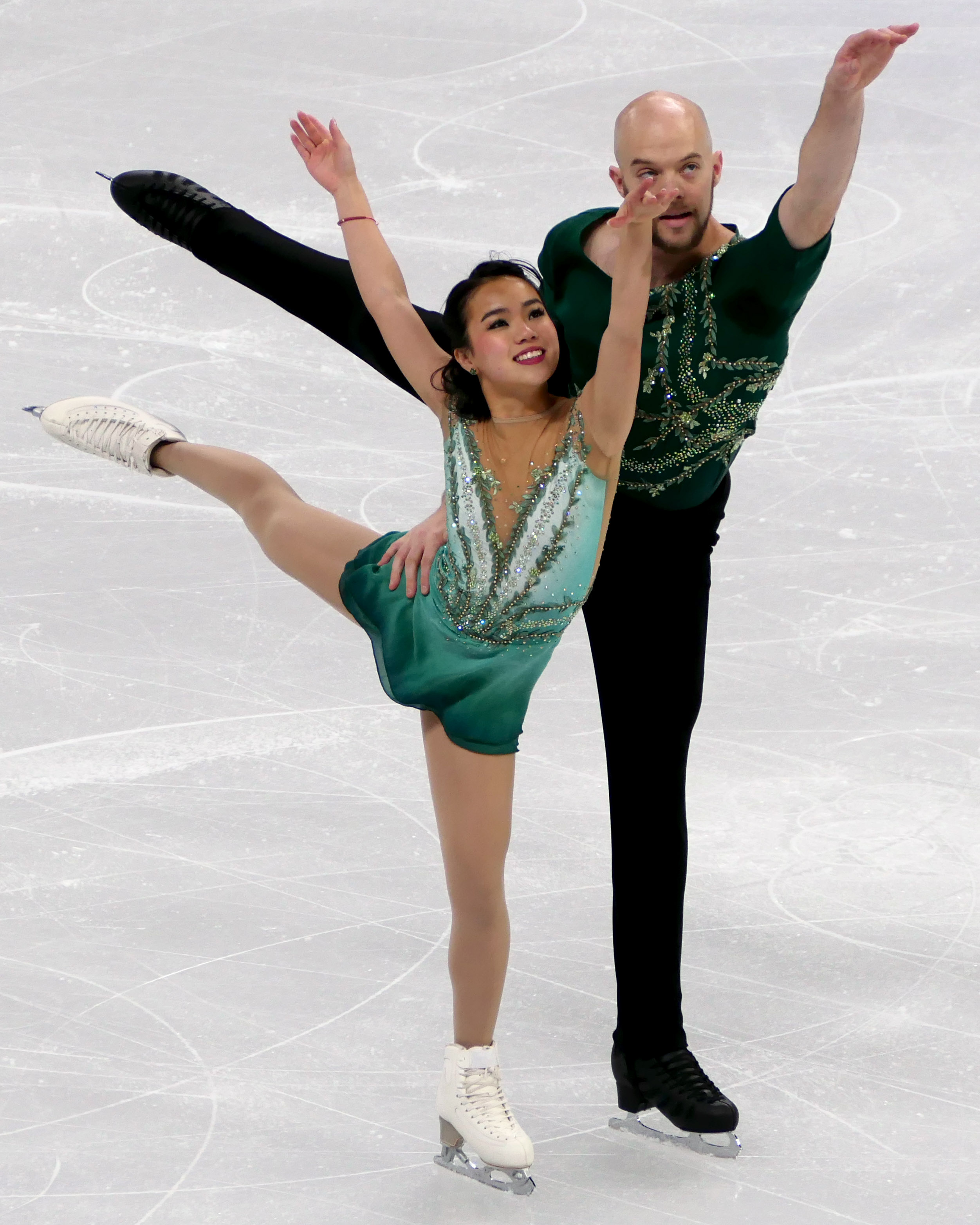
Kam and O'Shea performing a pair lift during their short program at the 2024 World Championships

Kam/O'Shea began the season with a victory at the 2023 CS Finlandia Trophy. They were invited to make their Grand Prix debut at the 2023 Grand Prix de France, and finished fifth in the short program, but had to withdraw after Kam suffered an injury in training. Despite this, Kam/O'Shea were able to attend their second Grand Prix, the 2023 Grand Prix of Espoo, coming sixth.

At the 2024 U.S. Championships, Kam/O'Shea finished second in the short program with a score of 64.57, with Kam having struggled on the throw landing and O'Shea two-footing his jump. Segment leaders Chan/Howe withdrew in advance of the free skate, leaving Kam/O'Shea the de facto first-place finishers heading into that segment. They were second in the free skate behind Efimova/Mitrofanov, but won their first national title by 0.85 points. O'Shea enthused that "being first is amazing," while noting there was room to improve on their performance, in particular continued difficulties with throw landings.

Kam/O'Shea had already been named to the American team for the 2024 Four Continents Championships in advance of the national championships, due to the events being separated by less than a week. Traveling to Shanghai for the competition, they finished fourth in the short program despite Kam's throw fall, before a second-place free skate lifted them to the bronze medal, their first international championship podium as a team. Kam noted that the turnaround between the events was such that she did not feel their national gold had "[sunk] in yet."

In the short program at the 2024 World Championships in Montreal, Quebec, Canada, Kam fell on their throw triple loop, but the team was otherwise clean and they came tenth in the segment. O'Shea said that it was "nice to see that with a fall – a fairly large mistake – we still get a season-best. That means the other things we’ve been working on are improving and the judges are starting to see that piece as well." Difficulties with jumps and throws continued in the free skate, and Kam/O'Shea dropped to eleventh overall.

=== 2024–2025 season: Two Grand Prix medals ===
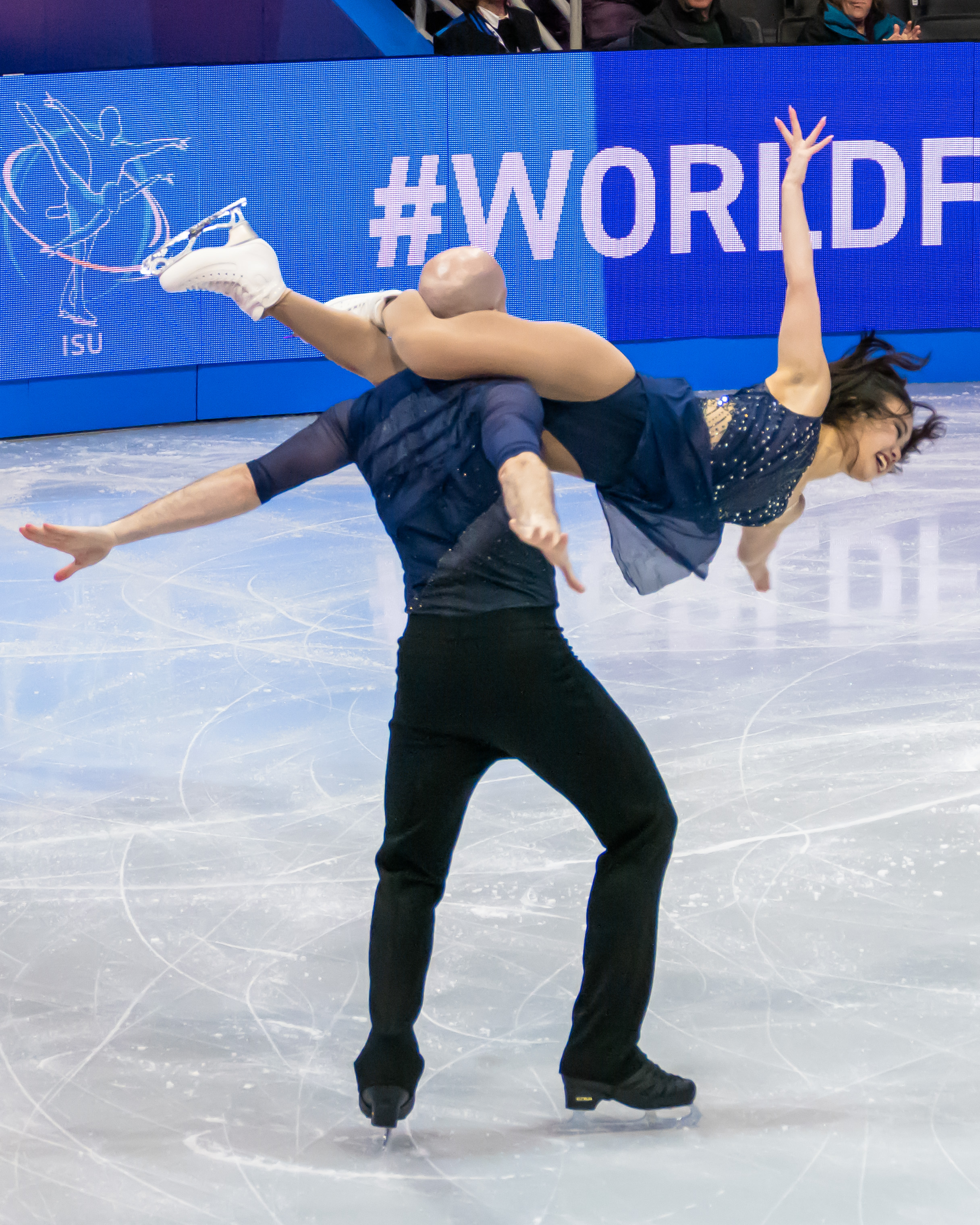
Kam and O'Shea performing a pair lift during their short program at the 2025 World Championships

Kam/O'Shea began their season by competing on the 2024–25 ISU Challenger Series. They won gold at the 2024 John Nicks Pairs Competition and bronze at the 2024 Nebelhorn Trophy.

Going on to compete on the 2024–25 Grand Prix series, the pair won the silver medal at the 2024 Skate America, scoring a personal best free skate and combined total score in the process. “We are really happy to be on the podium at Skate America,” said O’Shea. “This is our first Grand Prix medal. We worked very hard during the off-season, and this shows that the hard work paid off.” The team followed up this result with a bronze medal at the 2024 NHK Trophy. These Grand Prix series results allowed the pair to qualify for the 2024–25 Grand Prix Final, where they finished in fifth place.

Entering the 2025 U.S. Championships as defending champions, Kam/O'Shea won the short program with a clean skate. Their score of 77.19 points gave him an eight-point margin over Chan/Howe in second place. However, an error-riddled free skate that included a lift fall in addition to problems on jumps and throws saw them fifth in that segment, dropping to third overall. O'Shea vowed to use the lift failure as "motivation. I'm extremely pissed at myself. I know I'm far better than that, and I will do better next time."

Kam/O'Shea placed second in the short program at the 2025 Four Continents Championships in Seoul, South Korea, winning a silver small medal, despite Kam turning out of the landing of their throw triple loop. Their free skate again had a number of errors on jumps and throws, as a result of which they dropped to fourth overall, finishing 1.46 points behind bronze medalists Pereira/Michaud of Canada.

Two days prior to traveling for the 2025 World Championships in Boston, Massachusetts, United States, O'Shea broke his foot. In spite of this, O'Shea pushed himself to compete, determined to help earn three spots for U.S. pair skating at the 2026 Winter Olympics. Kam/O'Shea ultimately finished the event in seventh place after placing fifth in the short program and seventh in the free skate. Their placement, in addition to Efimova/Mitrofanov's sixth-place finish, earned three berths for U.S. pair skating at the 2026 Winter Olympics. In an interview following the event, O'Shea shared, "We are very happy with what we accomplished this week, together alongside Alisa and Misha. We secured the three spots for Worlds next year and the third potential Olympic spot. It means a lot to us." O'Shea subsequently had to receive surgery on his injured foot.

=== 2025–2026 season: Milano Cortina Olympics team gold and two Grand Prix medals ===
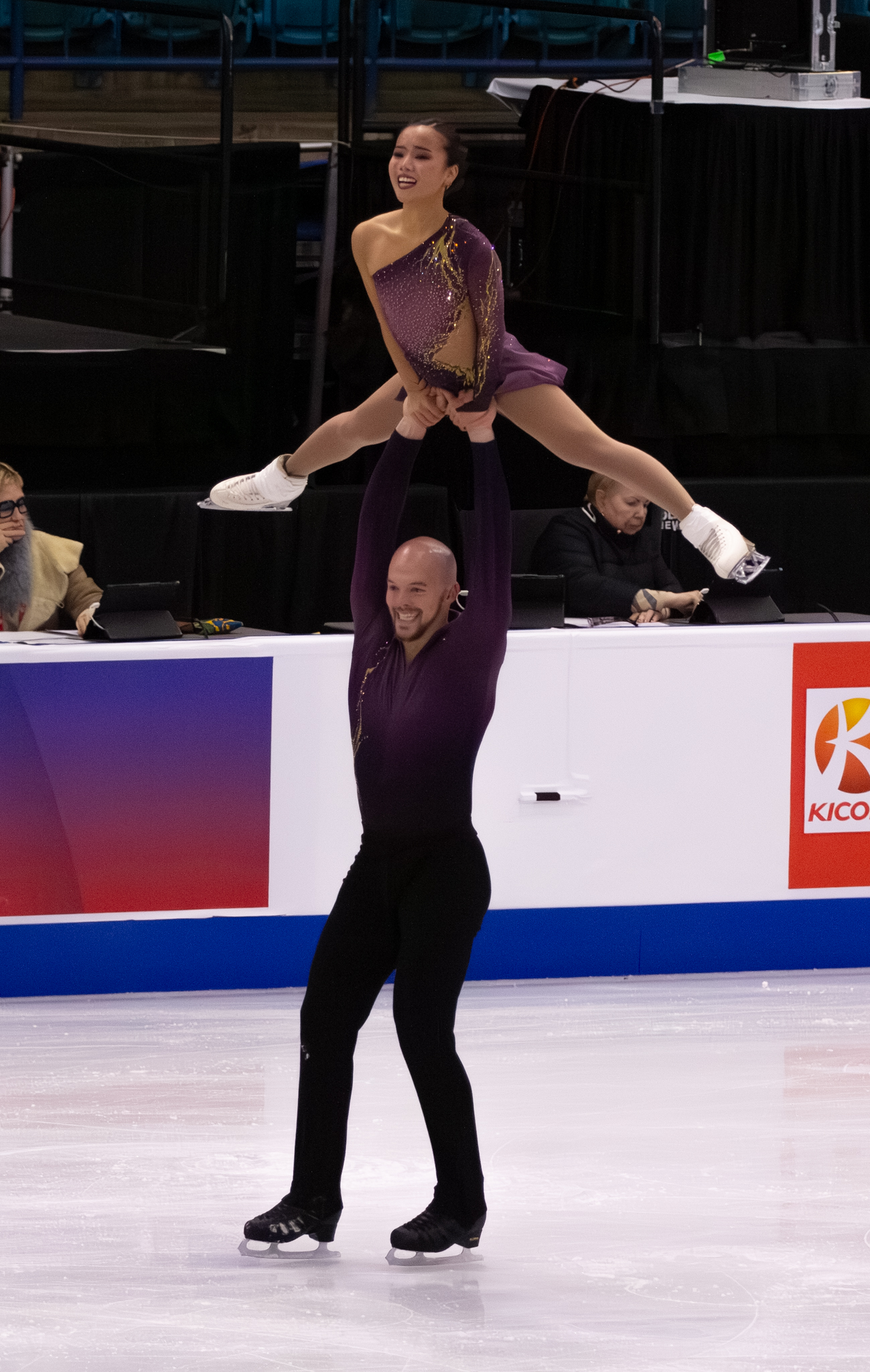
Kam and O'Shea performing a pair lift during their short program at the 2025 Skate Canada International

Kam/O'Shea opened their season at 2025 CS Trialeti Trophy where they placed fifth.

Three weeks later, the team competed at 2025 Skate Canada International where they won the bronze medal. “It was a tough off season for us," said O'Shea of the previous season. "Three months off the ice for myself and a month off for Ellie for random injuries and surgeries. We see ourselves be in a good path as we continue to grow with each competition."

Later the same month, Kam/O'Shea took another bronze at 2025 Finlandia Trophy. "It definitely helps just to have more experience at these competitions," said Kam. "I feel like last year I still felt I was so new to international competition and always feel so lucky to be here. But I think just being more comfortable at these competitions helps."

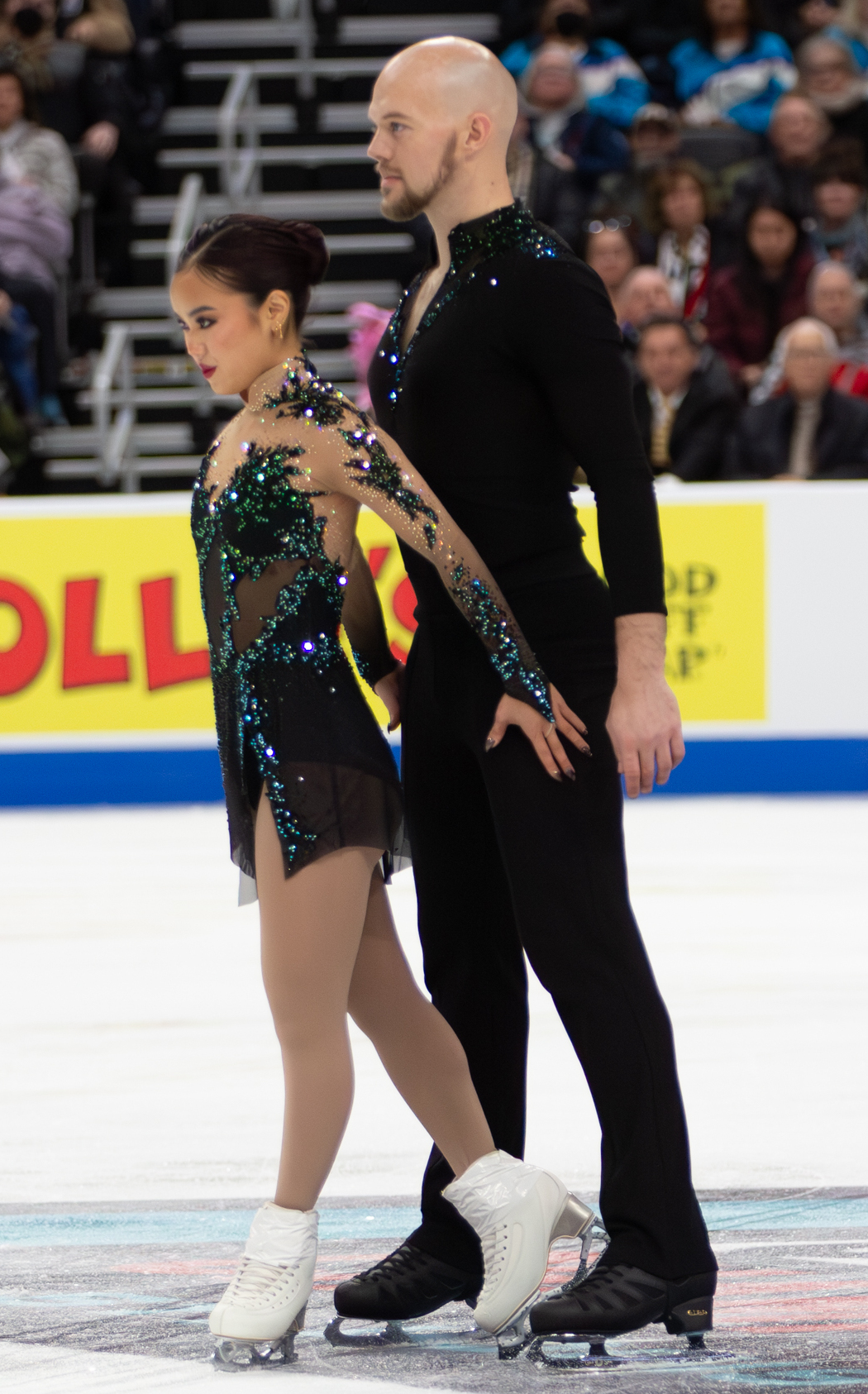
Kam and O'Shea during their free skate at the 2026 U.S. Championships

In January, Kam/O'Shea won the silver medal at the 2026 U.S. Championships behind Efimova/Mitrofanov. They were subsequently named to the 2026 Winter Olympic team. "It’s been a long journey," O’Shea reflected on his Olympic aspirations. "A long time on Team USA and a long time working towards this. And it was always a goal but coming back and skating with Ellie for these past four seasons, it’s been at the forefront of my mind for sure."

On 6 February, Kam/O'Shea placed fifth in the short program in the 2026 Winter Olympics Figure Skating Team Event after a fall on a throw triple loop. “The throws are something we’ve spent a lot of time working on since the start of our partnership” said Kam. “Some people say we struggle with them, but I don’t really see it that way. It’s more that it’s something we’ve had to work on a bit more compared to other teams. We’re still a relatively new team and still fine-tuning certain elements.” Two days later, the pair delivered a clean performance in the free skate, placing fourth in that segment and accumulating enough points to help Team United States of America win the gold medal. "It felt like a performance of a lifetime," Kam said after their free skate. "It’s certainly our personal best, and to put it out on a stage like this as a team, it feels amazing. We’re still improving, and there’s still a lot of opportunity to improve even from what we did tonight, but I think we couldn’t be more proud."

Following the Winter Olympics, Kam/O'Shea withdrew from the 2026 World Championships due to injury. Chan/Howe were called up to compete.

== Programs ==
=== Pair skating with Daniel O'Shea ===
Season	Short program	Free skating	Exhibition
2022–23	Nocturnal Animals; Exhibition; Wayward Sisters; Table for Two by Abel Korzeniowski choreo. by Drew Meekins	The Prayer performed by Charlotte Church & Josh Groban choreo. by Drew Meekins	
2023–24	Nocturnal Animals; Exhibition; Wayward Sisters; Table for Two by Abel Korzeniowski choreo. by Drew Meekins	East of Eden by Lee Holdridge choreo. by Drew Meekins	Uptown Funk by Mark Ronson ft. Bruno Mars
2024–25	Rain, in Your Black Eyes by Ezio Bosso choreo. by Drew Meekins	Concealed Passion by Audiomachine; Stand by Me by Ben E. King performed by Florence and the Machine choreo. by Marie-France Dubreuil	Uptown Funk by Mark Ronson ft. Bruno Mars; Cupid (Twin Version) by Fifty Fifty; On the Floor by Jennifer Lopez ft. Pitbull; Give Me Everything by Pitbull ft. Ne-Yo, Afrojack, & Nayer; Shake Señora by Pitbull ft. T-Pain & Sean Paul
2025–26	Hallelujah by Leonard Cohen performed by k.d. lang choreo. by Drew Meekins	Sweet Dreams (Are Made of This) by Eurythmics performed by Cinematic Pop, Rob Gardner, & Mckenna Breinholt; Eleanor Rigby by The Beatles performed by Cinematic Pop & Adam Payne; Everybody Wants to Rule the World by Tears for Fears performed by Cinematic Pop, Spencer Jones & Mckenna Breinholt choreo. by Marie-France Dubreuil	On the Floor by Jennifer Lopez ft. Pitbull; Give Me Everything by Pitbull ft. Ne-Yo, Afrojack, & Nayer; Shake Señora by Pitbull ft. T-Pain & Sean Paul

== Competitive highlights ==
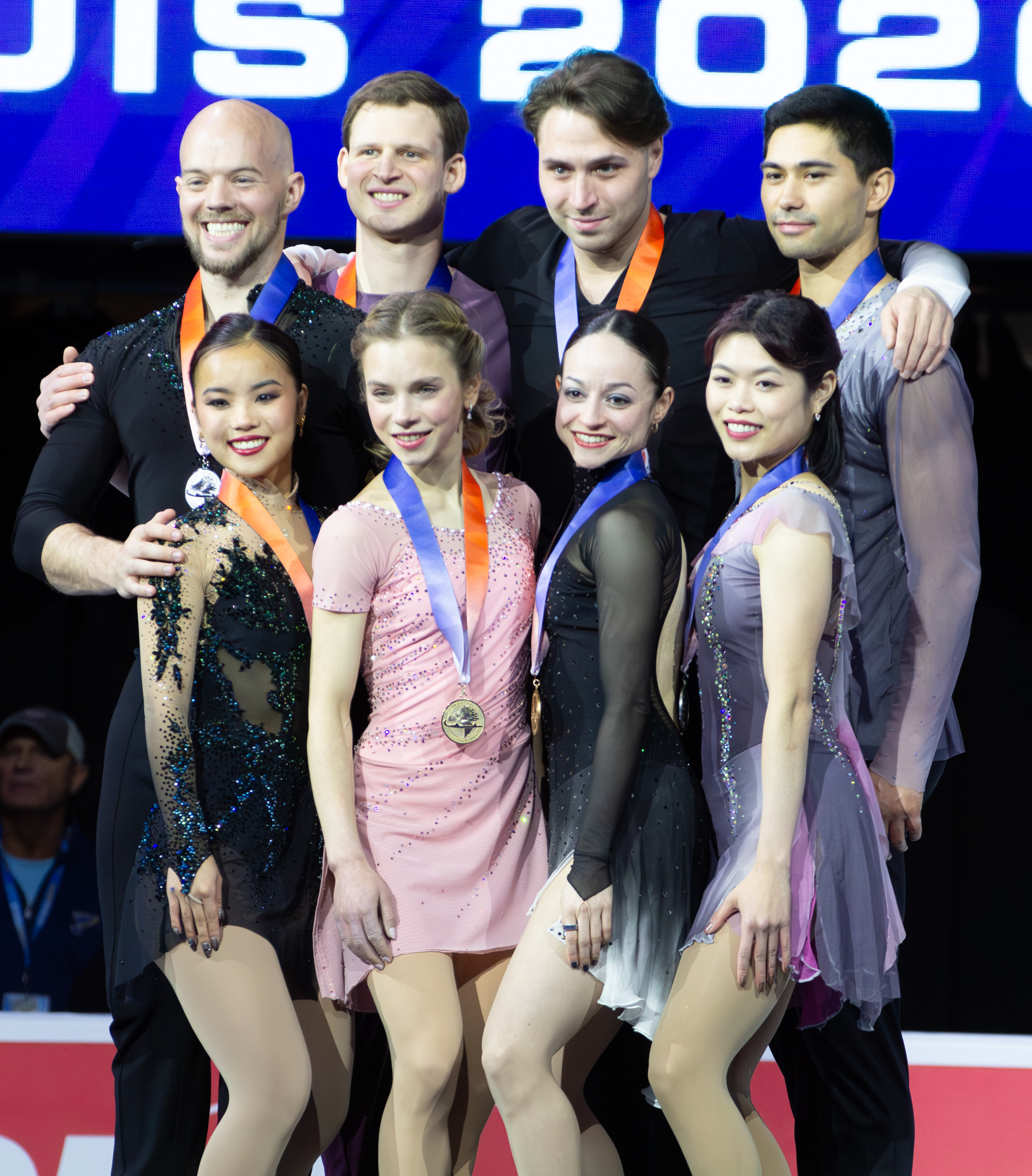
Kam and O'Shea (far left) during the medal ceremony at the 2026 U.S. Championships

- GP – Event of the ISU Grand Prix Series
- CS – Event of the ISU Challenger Series
- TBD – Assigned
- WD – Withdrew from competition
- Medals at team events are awarded for the team results only. Individual placements at team events are listed in parentheses.

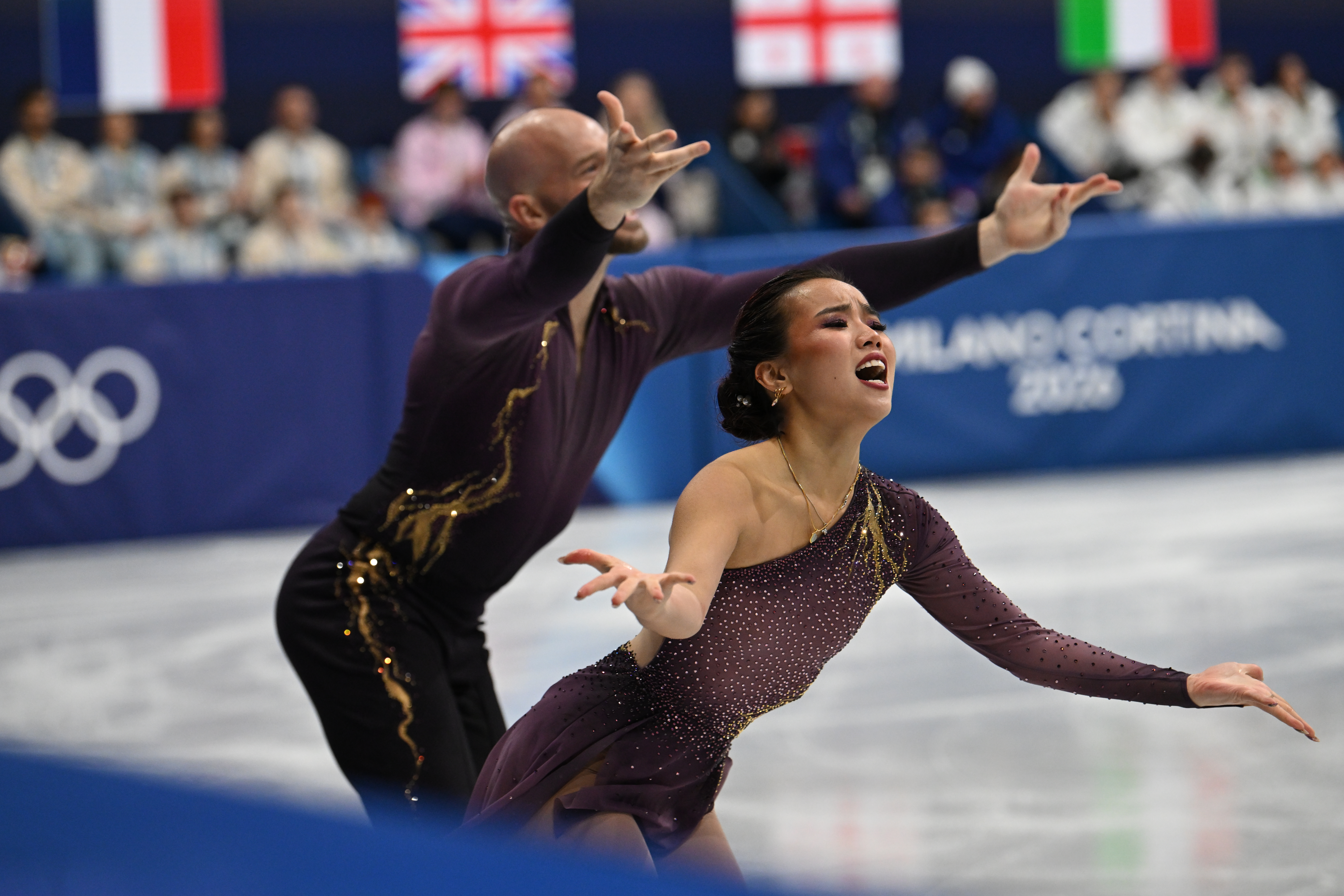
Kam and O'Shea at the 2026 Winter Olympics

=== Pair skating with Daniel O'Shea ===
Competition placements at senior level
Season	2022–23	2023–24	2024–25	2025–26
Winter Olympics				9th
Winter Olympics (Team event)				1st
World Championships	12th	11th	7th	
Four Continents Championships	6th	3rd	4th	
Grand Prix Final			5th	
U.S. Championships	3rd	1st	3rd	2nd
GP France		WD		
GP Finland		6th		3rd
GP NHK Trophy			3rd	
GP Skate America			2nd	
GP Skate Canada				3rd
CS Finlandia Trophy		1st		
CS Golden Spin of Zagreb	2nd			
CS John Nicks Pairs			1st	
CS Nebelhorn Trophy			3rd	
CS Trialeti Trophy				5th
Ice Challenge	1st			

== Detailed results ==
=== Pair skating with Daniel O'Shea ===
ISU personal best scores in the +5/-5 GOE System
Segment	Type	Score	Event
Total	TSS	201.73	2024 Skate America
Short program	TSS	73.16	2024 CS Nebelhorn Trophy
Short program	TES	40.58	2024 CS Nebelhorn Trophy
Short program	PCS	33.06	2026 Winter Olympics
Free skating	TSS	136.36	2026 Winter Olympics (Team event)
Free skating	TES	69.65	2026 Winter Olympics (Team event)
Free skating	PCS	66.37	2024 Skate America

- Small medals for the short program and free skating are only awarded at ISU Championships.

Results in the 2022–23 season
Date	Event	SP		FS		Total	
Date	Event	P	Score	P	Score	P	Score
Nov 9–13, 2022	(Austria) 2022 Ice Challenge	1	65.35	1	117.84	1	183.19
Dec 7–10, 2022	(Croatia) 2022 CS Golden Spin of Zagreb	3	62.07	2	116.76	2	178.83
Jan 26–28, 2023	(United States) 2023 U.S. Championships	3	65.75	3	118.26	3	184.01
Feb 7–12, 2023	(United States) 2023 Four Continents Championships	7	57.49	5	111.20	6	168.69
Mar 20–26, 2023	(Japan) 2023 World Championships	9	63.40	13	112.19	12	175.59

Results in the 2023–24 season
Date	Event	SP		FS		Total	
Date	Event	P	Score	P	Score	P	Score
Oct 4–8, 2023	(Finland) 2023 CS Finlandia Trophy	1	63.03	1	119.04	1	182.07
Nov 3–5, 2023	2023 Grand Prix de France	5	54.75	—N/a	—N/a	–	WD
Nov 17–19, 2023	(Finland) 2023 Grand Prix of Espoo	6	55.99	6	96.17	6	152.16
Jan 22–28, 2024	(United States) 2024 U.S. Championships	2	64.57	2	123.19	1	187.76
Jan 30 – Feb 4, 2024	(China) 2024 Four Continents Championships	4	60.72	2	126.56	3	187.28
Mar 18–24, 2024	(Canada) 2024 World Championships	10	64.44	11	115.97	11	180.41

Results in the 2024–25 season
Date	Event	SP		FS		Total	
Date	Event	P	Score	P	Score	P	Score
Sep 3–4, 2024	(United States) 2024 CS John Nicks Pairs Competition	1	67.46	2	124.16	1	191.62
Sep 18–21, 2024	(Germany) 2024 CS Nebelhorn Trophy	2	73.16	7	111.22	3	184.38
Oct 18–20, 2024	(United States) 2024 Skate America	2	70.66	2	131.07	2	201.73
Nov 8–10, 2024	(Japan) 2024 NHK Trophy	3	69.15	3	128.29	3	197.44
Dec 5–8, 2024	(France) 2024–25 Grand Prix Final	5	68.91	5	129.35	5	198.26
Jan 20–26, 2025	(United States) 2025 U.S. Championships	1	77.19	5	112.38	3	189.57
Feb 19–23, 2025	(South Korea) 2025 Four Continents Championships	2	70.32	4	126.62	4	196.94
Mar 25–30, 2025	(United States) 2025 World Championships	5	68.61	7	126.77	7	195.38

Results in the 2025–26 season
Date	Event	SP		FS		Total	
Date	Event	P	Score	P	Score	P	Score
Oct 8–11, 2025	(Georgia (country)) 2025 CS Trialeti Trophy	5	62.74	5	113.58	5	176.32
Oct 31 – Nov 2, 2025	2025 Skate Canada International	4	65.48	2	133.63	3	199.11
Nov 21–23, 2025	(Finland) 2025 Finlandia Trophy	2	70.24	3	128.85	3	199.09
Jan 4–11, 2026	(United States) 2026 U.S. Championships	3	67.13	2	129.99	2	197.12
Feb 6–8, 2026	(Italy) 2026 Winter Olympics – Team event	5	66.59	4	135.36	1	—N/a
Feb 6–19, 2026	(Italy) 2026 Winter Olympics	7	71.87	12	122.71	9	194.58
