= 2024 U.S. Figure Skating Championships =

Figure skating competition

- Type: National championship
- Date: January 22 – 28
- Season: 2023–24
- Location: Columbus, Ohio
- Host: U.S. Figure Skating
- Venue: Nationwide Arena

Champions
- Men's singles: Ilia Malinin (Senior) & Lucius Kazanecki (Junior)
- Women's singles: Amber Glenn (Senior) & Logan Higase-Chen (Junior)
- Pairs: Ellie Kam and Danny O'Shea (Senior) & Olivia Flores and Luke Wang (Junior)
- Ice dance: Madison Chock and Evan Bates (Senior) & Leah Neset and Artem Markelov (Junior)
- Previous: 2023 U.S. Championships
- Next: 2025 U.S. Championships

The 2024 U.S. Figure Skating Championships were held January 22–28, 2024, at the Nationwide Arena in Columbus, Ohio. Medals were awarded in men's singles, women's singles, pair skating, and ice dance at the senior and junior levels. The results were part of the U.S. selection criteria for the 2024 World Championships and 2024 World Junior Championships.

== Background ==
The U.S. Figure Skating Championships are an annual figure skating competition organized by U.S. Figure Skating to crown the national champions of the United States. The first U.S. Championships were held in 1914 in New Haven, Connecticut. The 2024 U.S. Championships were held from January 22 to 28 at Nationwide Arena in Columbus, Ohio.

== Qualification ==
Skaters qualified for the U.S. Championships by either having a bye or by competing at the Pacific Coast Sectional Finals, Eastern Sectional Finals, Midwestern Sectional Finals, U.S. Ice Dance Finals, or U.S. Pairs Finals.

Senior-level skaters were eligible for a bye if they met any of the following criteria:

- Placing in the top five at the 2023 U.S. Figure Skating Championships
- Selection to the 2024 World Championship team
- Winning a medal at the 2022 Winter Olympics
- Qualifying for the same event at the Grand Prix Final or the Junior Grand Prix Final
- Competing at three international assignments classified as an ISU Grand Prix, ISU Junior Grand Prix, or ISU Challenger Series event

Junior-level skaters were eligible for a bye if they met any of the following criteria:

- Qualifying for the same event at the Junior Grand Prix Final
- Competing at three international assignments classified as an ISU Junior Grand Prix or ISU Challenger Series event

After accounting for all byes, the top placements from the Singles Sectionals, U.S. Pairs Finals, or U.S. Ice Dance Finals were then assigned until the maximum number of competitors for each event (eighteen in men's singles, eighteen in women's singles, twelve in pairs, and fifteen in ice dance) was met.

=== Changes to preliminary assignments ===
U.S. Figure Skating published the official list of preliminary entries on November 21, 2023. These changes were reported after that original list was published.

Date	Discipline	Withdrew	Added	Notes	Ref.
November 27, 2023	Junior ice dance	Olivia Ilin; Dylan Cain	Zoe Cialella; David Goldshteyn	Attending the Winter Youth Olympics	
November 27, 2023	Junior women	Sherry Zhang	Teryn Kim	Attending the Winter Youth Olympics	
December 18, 2023	Senior ice dance	Lorraine McNamara; Anton Spiridonov	—N/a	McNamara and Spiridonov split.	
January 15, 2024	Senior ice dance	Kaitlin Hawayek; Jean-Luc Baker	—N/a	Hawayek and Baker are taking a competitive break.	
January 17, 2024	Senior women	Ava Marie Ziegler	Brooke Gewalt	Focusing on the Four Continents Championships	
January 20, 2024	Junior ice dance	Grace Yi; Danila Savelev	—N/a	—N/a	
January 20, 2024	Senior pairs	Megan Wessenberg; Edoardo Caputo	—N/a	—N/a	
January 25, 2024	Senior men	Lucas Broussard	—N/a	Medical reasons	

== Medal summary ==
=== Senior ===
Discipline	Gold	Silver	Bronze	Pewter
Men	Ilia Malinin	Jason Brown	Camden Pulkinen	Maxim Naumov
Women	Amber Glenn	Josephine Lee	Isabeau Levito	Sarah Everhardt
Pairs	Ellie Kam; Danny O'Shea	Alisa Efimova; Misha Mitrofanov	Valentina Plazas; Maximiliano Fernandez	Chelsea Liu; Balázs Nagy
Ice dance	Madison Chock; Evan Bates	Christina Carreira; Anthony Ponomarenko	Emily Bratti; Ian Somerville	Caroline Green; Michael Parsons

=== Junior ===
Discipline	Gold	Silver	Bronze	Pewter
Men	Lucius Kazanecki	Taira Shinohara	Aleksandr Fegan	Beck Strommer
Women	Logan Higase-Chen	Keira Hilbelink	Cleo Park	Emilia Nemirovsky
Pairs	Olivia Flores; Luke Wang	Naomi Williams; Lachlan Lewer	Sydney Cooke; Matthew Kennedy	Adele Zheng; Andy Deng
Ice dance	Leah Neset; Artem Markelov	Yahli Pedersen; Jeffrey Chen	Ethan Peal; Elliana Peal	Jenna Hauer; Benjamin Starr

== Senior results ==
=== Men's singles ===
Men's results
Rank	Skater	Total	SP		FS	
1st place, gold medalist(s)	Ilia Malinin	294.35	1	108.57	1	185.78
2nd place, silver medalist(s)	Jason Brown	264.50	3	89.02	2	175.48
3rd place, bronze medalist(s)	Camden Pulkinen	262.33	5	87.90	3	174.43
4	Maxim Naumov	260.50	2	89.72	4	170.78
5	Andrew Torgashev	239.21	4	88.02	7	151.19
6	Jimmy Ma	238.57	9	76.54	6	162.03
7	Yaroslav Paniot	233.17	12	70.30	5	162.87
8	Tomoki Hiwatashi	230.80	6	81.31	9	149.49
9	Daniel Martynov	227.05	8	77.53	8	149.52
10	Goku Endo	222.17	7	80.11	10	142.06
11	Kai Kovar	210.73	11	71.98	12	138.75
12	Daniel Samohin	202.96	14	63.97	11	138.99
13	Liam Kapeikis	192.69	10	72.44	15	120.25
14	Michael Xie	184.51	17	60.30	13	124.21
15	Samuel Mindra	180.93	16	60.40	14	120.53
16	Will Annis	176.10	15	63.17	16	112.93
17	Joseph Klein	172.01	13	68.33	17	103.68

=== Women's singles ===
Women's results
Rank	Skater	Total	SP		FS	
1st place, gold medalist(s)	Amber Glenn	210.46	2	74.98	2	135.48
2nd place, silver medalist(s)	Josephine Lee	204.13	5	65.28	1	138.85
3rd place, bronze medalist(s)	Isabeau Levito	200.68	1	75.38	4	125.30
4	Sarah Everhardt	193.37	6	63.21	3	130.16
5	Clare Seo	187.56	3	67.41	6	120.15
6	Starr Andrews	185.49	9	60.35	5	125.14
7	Lindsay Thorngren	180.98	4	65.33	8	115.65
8	Mia Kalin	177.81	10	59.71	7	118.10
9	Audrey Shin	175.61	7	62.79	10	112.82
10	Elyce Lin-Gracey	173.11	10	59.71	9	114.86
11	Soho Lee	167.03	8	61.92	13	105.11
12	Sonja Hilmer	164.89	12	57.16	12	107.73
13	Wren Warne-Jacobsen	161.23	16	50.07	11	111.16
14	Katie Shen	160.87	13	56.87	15	104.00
15	Michelle Lee	156.84	14	55.23	16	101.61
16	Brooke Gewalt	154.84	15	54.56	17	100.28
17	Lindsay Wang	152.80	18	47.90	14	104.90
18	Alex Evans	142.33	17	49.42	18	92.91

=== Pairs ===
Emily Chan and Spencer Akira Howe withdrew from the competition after the short program for medical reasons.

Pairs' results
Rank	Team	Total	SP		FS	
1st place, gold medalist(s)	Ellie Kam; Danny O'Shea	187.76	2	64.57	2	123.19
2nd place, silver medalist(s)	Alisa Efimova; Misha Mitrofanov	186.91	5	60.48	1	126.43
3rd place, bronze medalist(s)	Valentina Plazas; Maximiliano Fernandez	181.03	4	63.18	4	117.85
4	Chelsea Liu; Balázs Nagy	178.83	6	60.13	3	118.70
5	Katie McBeath; Daniil Parkman	172.81	3	64.21	5	108.60
6	Isabelle Martins; Ryan Bedard	165.93	7	58.18	6	107.75
7	Nica Digerness; Mark Sadusky	157.12	8	55.72	7	101.40
8	Ellie Korytek; Timmy Chapman	148.83	9	55.57	8	93.26
9	Maria Mokhova; Ivan Mokhov	139.82	10	51.51	10	88.31
10	Linzy Fitzpatrick; Keyton Bearinger	132.67	11	43.26	9	89.41
WD	Emily Chan; Spencer Akira Howe	withdrew	1	65.86	withdrew from competition	

=== Ice dance ===
Ice dance results
Rank	Team	Total	RD		FD	
1st place, gold medalist(s)	Madison Chock; Evan Bates	215.92	1	92.17	2	123.75
2nd place, silver medalist(s)	Christina Carreira; Anthony Ponomarenko	210.04	2	83.19	1	126.85
3rd place, bronze medalist(s)	Emily Bratti; Ian Somerville	196.94	4	78.14	3	118.80
4	Caroline Green; Michael Parsons	193.83	3	80.91	4	112.92
5	Eva Pate; Logan Bye	184.75	7	73.81	5	110.94
6	Emilea Zingas; Vadym Kolesnik	181.70	5	77.59	8	104.11
7	Isabella Flores; Ivan Desyatov	179.67	9	69.38	6	110.29
8	Oona Brown; Gage Brown	179.43	6	76.44	9	102.99
9	Katarina Wolfkostin; Dimitry Tsarevski	178.05	8	70.40	7	107.65
10	Angela Ling; Caleb Wein	166.73	10	66.13	10	100.59
11	Rafaella Koncius; Alexey Shchepetov	149.36	11	58.00	11	91.36
12	Klara Kowar; Thomas Schawappach	132.62	12	53.29	12	79.33
13	Cara Murphy; Joshua Levitt	105.39	13	36.54	13	68.85

== Junior results ==
=== Men's singles ===
Men's results
Rank	Skater	Total	SP		FS	
1st place, gold medalist(s)	Lucius Kazanecki	202.97	5	64.51	1	138.46
2nd place, silver medalist(s)	Taira Shinohara	198.08	6	64.11	2	133.97
3rd place, bronze medalist(s)	Aleksandr Fegan	194.95	1	71.00	5	123.95
4	Beck Strommer	193.28	2	66.50	4	126.78
5	Nicholas Brooks	192.83	3	65.81	3	127.02
6	Lorenzo Elano	186.65	7	62.70	6	123.95
7	Kirk Haugeto	185.48	4	64.61	7	120.87
8	Sergei Evseev	171.06	9	60.22	9	110.84
9	Vaclav Vasquez	169.63	11	57.12	8	112.51
10	Jared Sedlis	162.65	8	61.49	14	101.16
11	Caleb Farrington	161.41	14	53.45	11	107.96
12	August Perthus	161.33	15	53.21	10	108.12
13	Jon Maravilla	159.26	10	58.35	15	100.91
14	Marlo Rosen	156.45	13	53.65	12	102.80
15	Antonio Monaco	156.35	12	54.71	13	101.64
16	Ryedin Rudedenman	135.77	17	48.32	17	87.45
17	Alek Tankovic	131.93	19	44.25	16	87.68
18	Alvin Luu	127.55	18	46.33	18	81.22
19	Ryan William Azadpour	122.68	20	42.07	19	80.61
WD	Luke Wang	withdrew	16	49.58	withdrew from competition	

=== Women's singles ===
Women's results
Rank	Skater	Total	SP		FS	
1st place, gold medalist(s)	Logan Higase-Chen	178.42	3	58.72	1	119.70
2nd place, silver medalist(s)	Keira Hilbelink	173.88	6	57.03	2	116.85
3rd place, bronze medalist(s)	Cleo Park	172.41	1	60.81	4	111.60
4	Emilia Nemirovsky	164.38	2	59.01	5	105.37
5	Annika Chao	164.09	11	52.45	3	111.64
6	Jiaying Ellyse Johnson	162.86	4	58.35	6	104.51
7	Angela Shao	152.95	13	49.05	7	103.90
8	Ela Cui	151.49	5	57.08	10	94.41
9	Sophie Joline von Felton	150.57	7	56.31	11	94.26
10	Teryn Kim	150.05	8	54.40	9	95.65
11	Hannah Kim	148.90	12	51.30	8	97.60
12	Jessica Jurka	142.23	9	53.00	13	89.23
13	Alina Bonillo	137.52	10	52.66	14	84.86
14	Sofia Bezkorovainaya	137.52	17	42.57	12	93.88
15	Elena Wilson	130.89	15	46.20	15	84.69
16	Zhiqi Zhang	127.19	16	45.51	16	81.68
17	Maria Plantonova	119.95	14	46.84	18	73.11
18	Jasmine Clarke	118.69	18	39.38	17	79.31

=== Pairs ===
Pairs' results
Rank	Team	Total	SP		FS	
1st place, gold medalist(s)	Olivia Flores; Luke Wang	175.71	1	59.83	1	115.88
2nd place, silver medalist(s)	Naomi Williams; Lachlan Lewer	151.24	3	48.64	2	102.60
3rd place, bronze medalist(s)	Sydney Cooke; Matthew Kennedy	134.40	2	50.24	4	84.16
4	Adele Zheng; Andy Deng	129.56	6	43.99	3	85.57
5	Saya Carpenter; Jon Maravilla	126.39	5	45.50	5	80.89
6	Reagan Moss; Jakub Galbavy	124.75	4	45.64	6	79.11
7	Audrey Park; Carter Griffin	118.71	7	43.19	7	75.52
8	Ashley Fletcher; Aaron Felberbaum	109.58	8	36.91	8	72.67
9	Melania Delis; Jaden Schwab	100.64	9	35.89	9	64.75

=== Ice dance ===
Ice dance results
Rank	Team	Total	RD		FD	
1st place, gold medalist(s)	Leah Neset; Artem Markelov	184.11	1	75.03	1	109.08
2nd place, silver medalist(s)	Yahli Pedersen; Jeffrey Chen	158.97	3	63.88	2	95.09
3rd place, bronze medalist(s)	Ethan Peal; Elliana Peal	152.10	5	60.95	3	91.15
4	Jenna Hauer; Benjamin Starr	151.00	2	64.55	5	86.45
5	Caroline Mullen; Brendan Mullen	149.71	4	61.08	4	88.63
6	Kristina Bland; Matthew Sperry	133.85	6	52.74	6	81.11
7	Amy Cui; Kenny Eckert	129.72	7	51.80	7	77.92
8	Julia Epps; Blake Gilman	124.72	8	49.95	8	74.77
9	Emily Renzi; William Lissauer	120.34	9	48.30	9	72.04
10	Zoe Cialella; David Goldshteyn	97.46	11	42.49	10	54.97
WD	Sylvia Li; Rowan Le Coq	withdrew	10	45.81	withdrew from competition	

== International team selections ==
=== World Junior Championships ===
The 2024 World Junior Championships were held from February 26 to March 3, 2024, in Taipei, Taiwan. Teams were selected using the Athlete Selection Criteria.

No.	Men	Women	Pairs	Ice dance
1	Daniel Martynov	Josephine Lee	Olivia Flores; Luke Wang	Leah Neset; Artem Markelov
2	Jacob Sanchez	Sherry Zhang	Naomi Williams; Lachlan Lewer	Yahli Pedersen; Jeffrey Chen
3	—N/a		Adele Zheng; Andy Deng	Elliana Peal; Ethan Peal

Alternates

No.	Men	Women	Pairs	Ice dance
1	Beck Strommer	Logan Higase-Chen	—N/a	Jenna Hauer; Benjamin Starr
2	Taira Shinohara	Sarah Everhardt	—N/a	Caroline Mullen; Brendan Mullen
3	Lucius Kazanecki	Elyce Lin-Gracey	—N/a	Olivia Ilin; Dylan Cain

=== World Championships ===
The 2024 World Championships were held from March 18–24, 2024, in Montreal, Canada. Teams were selected using the Athlete Selection criteria.

No.	Men	Women	Pairs	Ice dance
1	Jason Brown	Amber Glenn	Emily Chan; Spencer Akira Howe	Emily Bratti; Ian Somerville
2	Ilia Malinin	Isabeau Levito	Ellie Kam; Daniel O'Shea	Christina Carreira; Anthony Ponomarenko
3	Camden Pulkinen	—N/a	Valentina Plazas; Maximiliano Fernandez	Madison Chock; Evan Bates

Alternates

No.	Men	Women	Pairs	Ice dance
1	Maxim Naumov	Ava Marie Ziegler	Chelsea Liu; Balázs Nagy	Caroline Green; Michael Parsons
2	Andrew Torgashev	Elyce Lin-Gracey	Isabelle Martins; Ryan Bedard	Eva Pate; Logan Bye
3	Jimmy Ma	Starr Andrews	—N/a	Emilea Zingas; Vadym Kolesnik
