= Natalia Mishkutionok =

Belarusian pair skater (born 1970)

Personal information
- Native name: Наталья Евгеньевна Мишкутёнок
- Full name: Natalia Yevgenievna Mishkutionok
- Other names: Mishkutenok/Mishkutienok
- Born: 14 July 1970 (age 56) Minsk, Byelorussian SSR, Soviet Union
- Height: 1.59 m (5 ft 2 1/2 in)

Figure skating career
- Country: Russia
- Retired: 1994
Medal record
Figure skating: Pairs
Representing Russia
Winter Olympic Games
Silver medal – second place	1994 Lillehammer	Pairs
European Championships
Bronze medal – third place	1994 Copenhagen	Pairs
Representing CIS ( Unified Team)
Winter Olympic Games
Gold medal – first place	1992 Albertville	Pairs
World Championships
Gold medal – first place	1992 Oakland	Pairs
European Championships
Gold medal – first place	1992 Lausanne	Pairs
Representing Soviet Union
World Championships
Gold medal – first place	1991 Munich	Pairs
Bronze medal – third place	1990 Halifax	Pairs
European Championships
Gold medal – first place	1991 Sofia	Pairs
Bronze medal – third place	1990 Leningrad	Pairs
Bronze medal – third place	1989 Birmingham	Pairs

Natalia Yevgenievna Mishkutionok (Note: Belarusian: Наталля Яўгенаўна Мішкуцёнак, romanized: Natallya Yawhyenawna Mishkutsyonak; Russian: Наталья Евгеньевна Мишкутёнок, romanized: Natalya Yevgenyevna Mishkutyonok) (born 14 July 1970) is a Belarusian figure skating coach and former competitive pair skater. With Artur Dmitriev, she is the 1992 Olympic champion, the 1994 Olympic silver medalist, a two-time World champion (1991, 1992), and a two-time European champion (1991, 1992).

== Personal life ==
Natalia Mishkutionok was born on 14 July 1970 to a Polish mother and a Belarusian father in the Byelorussian SSR. From 1989 to 1995, she attended Lesgaft National State University of Physical Education, Sport and Health in Saint Petersburg, Russia, where she earned a master's degree in physical education.

Following her retirement from competitive figure skating, Mishkutionok settled in Colorado Springs, Colorado in 1995 before moving to Texas in 2001. She was formerly married to American ice hockey player Craig Shepherd, with whom she skated professionally on occasion during the late 1990s. She divorced Shepherd and married Alan Hainline. Their daughter, Natasha Alena Mishkutionok-Hainline, was born on 16 January 2006. Natasha became a competitive figure skater as well.

In 2020, Mishkutionok moved back to Colorado Springs, Colorado, where she now coaches.

== Career ==
Mishkutionok began skating in 1976. She teamed up with Artur Dmitriev around 1986. They were coached by Tamara Moskvina in Saint Petersburg and their choreographers were Alexander Matveev with Moskvina. Together, Mishkutionok/Dmitriev won the 1991 and 1992 World and European Championships, and Olympic gold in 1992. They performed to Franz Liszt's Liebesträume (Dream of Love), which became one of the most noted programs of their career and earned them four perfect 6.0 marks at the 1992 World Championships in Oakland, California. They turned professional shortly after that championship.

Mishkutionok/Dmitriev chose to reinstate as amateurs after the ban against such actions was lifted. They attempted to defend their Olympic title in the 1994 Winter Olympics, where they delivered two strong programs. Their free skate to Rachmaninov's 2nd Piano Concerto earned a standing ovation and is considered one of their finest performances. The judges awarded the gold medal to Mishkutionok and Dmitriev's friends and countrymen Ekaterina Gordeeva / Sergei Grinkov ("G & G"). Mishkutionok decided to retire from competition in 1994.

One hallmark of Mishkutionok/Dmitriev's style was her flexibility and their creative spins, especially one in which Mishkutionok would do a split and point her head down, with an arm around Dmitriev's calf so that they were both vertical and aligned; this signature move, called "Natalia’s spin" was incorporated into most of their programs. Another signature move was a backwards inside death spiral in which Mishkutionok bent backwards, holding her foot behind and above her head while Dmitriev also held her raised skate blade and her free hand. Mishkutionok/Dmitriev competed before, during, and after the breakup of the Soviet Union, thus, they competed for the Soviet Union, the Unified Team, and Russia, all within a four-year period.

Mishkutionok previously coached pairs and singles skaters in Grapevine, Texas and Farmers Branch, Texas, before relocating to Colorado Springs, Colorado to coach at the Broadmoor World Arena. Her students have included:

- Nica Digerness / Mark Sadusky
- Olivia Flores / Luke Wang
- Hannah Herrera / Ivan Khobta
- Pauline Irman / Benjamin Jalovick
- Milada Kovar / Jared McPike
- Naomi Williams / Lachlan Lewer
- Miyu Yunoki / Tristan Taylor

== Programs ==
Season	Short program	Free skating	Exhibition
1993–1994	Don Quixote by Ludwig Minkus; Rhapsody on a Theme of Paganini by Sergei Rachmaninoff	"The Symphony of Emotions": Piano Concerto #2 by Sergei Rachmaninoff	Eve by Uña Ramos; Nostalgia
1992–1993	Rhapsody on a Theme of Paganini by Sergei Rachmaninoff	Flute Dance	
1990–1992	Don Quixote by Ludwig Minkus; The Swan by Camille Saint-Saëns	Liebestraum by Franz Liszt performed by the Philadelphia Orchestra	Somewhere in Your Heart by Frank Sinatra; War Drums; Peasant Dance
1988–1990	The Swan	Let's Dance Together (Jewish folk music)	Piano Piece ("The Death Spiral"); Peasant Dance; Rhapsody on a Theme of Paganini by Sergei Rachmaninoff; War drums
1987–1988	Entrance of the Gladiators by Julius Fučík	unknown	

== Competitive highlights ==
(with Artur Dmitriev)

International
Event	1987–88	1988–89	1989–90	1990–91	1991–92	1993–94
Winter Olympics					1st	2nd
World Champ.			3rd	1st	1st	
European Champ.	4th	3rd	3rd	1st	1st	3rd
GPI de Paris					1st	1st
Nations Cup				1st		
NHK Trophy				3rd		
Skate America		1st	1st			
Goodwill Games			2nd			1st
Moscow News	4th	1st				
Piruetten						1st
Universiade		1st				
National
Russian Champ.						2nd
Soviet Champ.	2nd	2nd	2nd	2nd		

Professional

Event	1992–93
World Pro. Championships	3rd
World Challenge of Champions	3rd
US Open Pro.	1st
