= Susan Sullivan (Alaska politician) =

American politician (1946–2026)

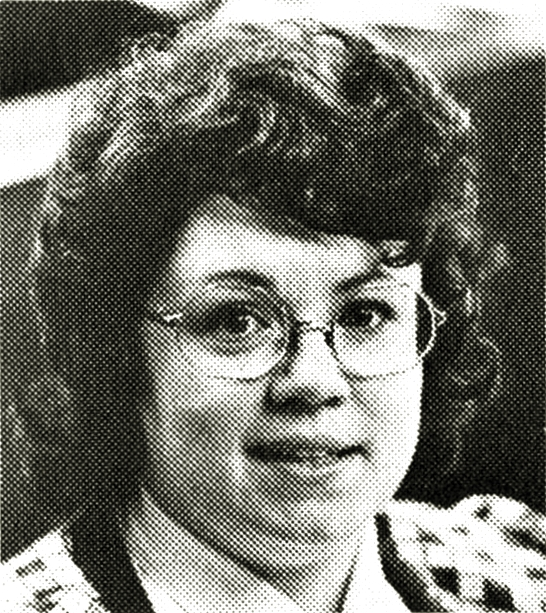

Susan Meekins Sullivan (December 24, 1946 – June 9, 2026) was an American politician.

== Life and career ==
Sullivan was born in Mountain View, Anchorage, a neighborhood in Anchorage, Alaska Territory, on December 24, 1946. She graduated from Anchorage High School in 1965 and received her bachelor's degree in business and economics from Alaska Methodist University in 1970. Sullivan also went to University of Alaska for pre-elementary education in 1972 and was involved with the land law business. She served in the Alaska House of Representatives in 1975 and 1976 and was a Democrat. Her father Russ Meekins Sr. and her brother Russ Meekins Jr. also served in the Alaska State Legislature.

Sullivan died on June 9, 2026, at the age of 79.
