= Russ Meekins Jr. =

American politician (1949–2020)

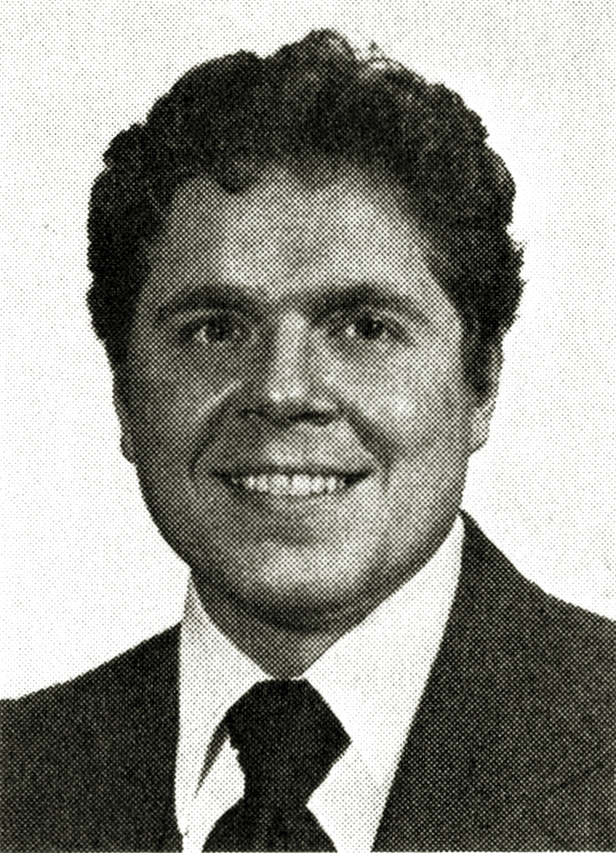
Russ Meekins in 1977

Edward Russell Meekins Jr. (June 29, 1949 – September 13, 2020) was an American politician who served four terms as a Democratic member of the Alaska House of Representatives from 1973 to 1974 and from 1977 to 1982. He went to Oregon State University, University of Oregon, and Anchorage Community College majoring in economics, history, and political science. He also earned a MPA from Harvard University. Meekins worked for Alaska Water Refining Company and was the vice-president of the company. His father Russ Meekins Sr. and sister Susan Sullivan also served in that body. Meekins died at his home in Sandwich, Massachusetts. He was the father of figure skater Drew Meekins and rapper Cam Meekins.
