= Russ Meekins Sr. =

American politician

Edward Russell Meekins Sr.
- Born: November 17, 1915; Pennsylvania, US
- Died: August 10, 1995 (aged 79); Anchorage, Alaska, US
- Occupations: Politician, salesman
- Political party: Democratic

Edward Russell Meekins Sr. (November 17, 1915 – August 10, 1995) was an American politician who served as a member of the Alaska House of Representatives in 1959 and 1960. Meekins was a Democrat. He was a salesman of new and used cars in Anchorage, Alaska and was popularly known around town as "Hustling Russ". His son Russ Meekins Jr. and his daughter Susan Sullivan also served in the Alaska State Legislature. His grandson was the figure skater Drew Meekins.
