= Annika Chao =

American figure skater

Personal information
- Born: 11 October 2009 (age 17) Portland, Oregon, U.S.
- Home town: Irvine, California, U.S.
- Height: 170 cm (5 ft 7 in)

Figure skating career
- Country: United States
- Discipline: Women's singles
- Coach: Grant Hochstein; Chris Pottenger; Caroline Zhang; Russ Scott; Anthony Evans; Tiffany Chin
- Skating club: Glacier Falls Figure Skating Club
- Began skating: 2012

Annika Chao (born 11 October 2009) is an American figure skater. She placed second at the U.S. Junior National Championships (2026) and second in the junior category of the Cranberry Cup International (2025).

Chao currently competes domestically and internationally at the junior level, and she has competed on the Junior Grand Prix circuit representing the United States. Her coach, Grant Hochstein, also choreographs her programs. She is noted for her balletic skating movements and her spin technique.

== Personal life ==
Annika is the daughter of Jackie Chao, and has an older sister named Addison. She enjoys playing tennis, reading, and baking, and has a pet rabbit. Chao attends California Online Public School. She is from Portland, Oregon, but later moved to California.

== Career ==
=== Early years ===
Chao began skating at age 3 after attending skating classes with her sister, who wanted to start skating. She grew up skating at the Lloyd Center Ice Rink before moving her training location to Anaheim, California due to the difficulty of finding ice time in the Portland area. Chao was formerly a member of the Portland Ice Skating Club. Her former coaches include Diane Rawlinson and Rafael Arutyunyan.

=== 2023–24 season: Junior international debut ===
Chao made her Junior Grand Prix debut at the 2023 ISU Junior Grand Prix in Thailand. She placed third after the short program and fifth overall. In October, she placed second at the Kings Cup International. At the Kings Cup, she achieved her international personal best score in the free skate, a 120.8. She qualified for the U.S. Championships after placing second at the Pacific Coast Sectional Singles Final, and placed 5th in the junior category of the 2024 U.S. Championships.

=== 2024–25 season ===
Chao competed at the 2024 ISU Junior Grand Prix in Latvia and placed 8th overall. She placed 5th at the 2025 U.S. Championships and second at the 3rd Maria Olszewska Memorial.

=== 2025–26 season ===
Chao placed second at the 2025 Cranberry Cup International. She went to the 2025 ISU Junior Grand Prix in Italy, and placed 5th. She scored 59.37 in the short program at that competition, achieving an international personal best score for that segment. At the 2025 Santa Claus Cup, she placed 1st overall. She went on to place 2nd at the 2026 U.S. Figure Skating Championships.

=== 2026–27 season ===
Chao attended the 2026 ISU Junior Grand Prix in China in August, where she placed 12th overall. In an interview after the 2026 U.S. Championships, Chao stated that she plans to begin competing at senior domestically in the following (2027–28) season.

== Programs ==
Competition programs by season
Season	Short program	Free skate program
2023-24	"No Roots": Performed by Alice Merton; Choreo. by Adam Blake & Phillip Mills	"Easy on Me": Performed by Adele; Choreo. by Adam Blake & Phillip Mills
2024-25	"Dog Days Are Over": Performed by Florence & the Machine; Choreo. by Adam Blake	"I Surrender": Performed by Celine Dion; Choreo. by Adam Blake
2025-26	"Swan": Composed by Camille Saint-Saëns; Performed by Yo-Yo Ma; Choreo. by Grant Hochstein	"Waiting on a Wish": From Disney's Snow White; Performed by Rachel Zegler; Choreo. by Grant Hochstein
2026-27	"The Nutcracker Op 71, Pas de deux": Composed by Pyotr Ilyich Tchaikovsky; Performed by André Previn & London Symphony Orchestra; Choreo. by Grant Hochstein	"Romeo & Juliet": Composed by Nino Rota; Performed by Nic Raine & The City of Prague Philharmonic Orchestra; Choreo. by Grant Hochstein

== Competitive highlights ==
- JGP – Event of the ISU Grand Prix Series
- TBD – Assigned

Competition placements at junior level
Season	2023–24	2024–25	2025–26	2026–27
U.S. Championships	5th	5th	2nd	
JGP China				12th
JGP Italy			5th	
JGP Latvia		8th		
JGP Thailand	5th			
CS Cranberry Cup			2nd	
King's Cup International	2nd			
Olszewska Memorial			2nd	
Santa Claus Cup			1st	
