= Spencer Howe =

American figure skater (born 1996)

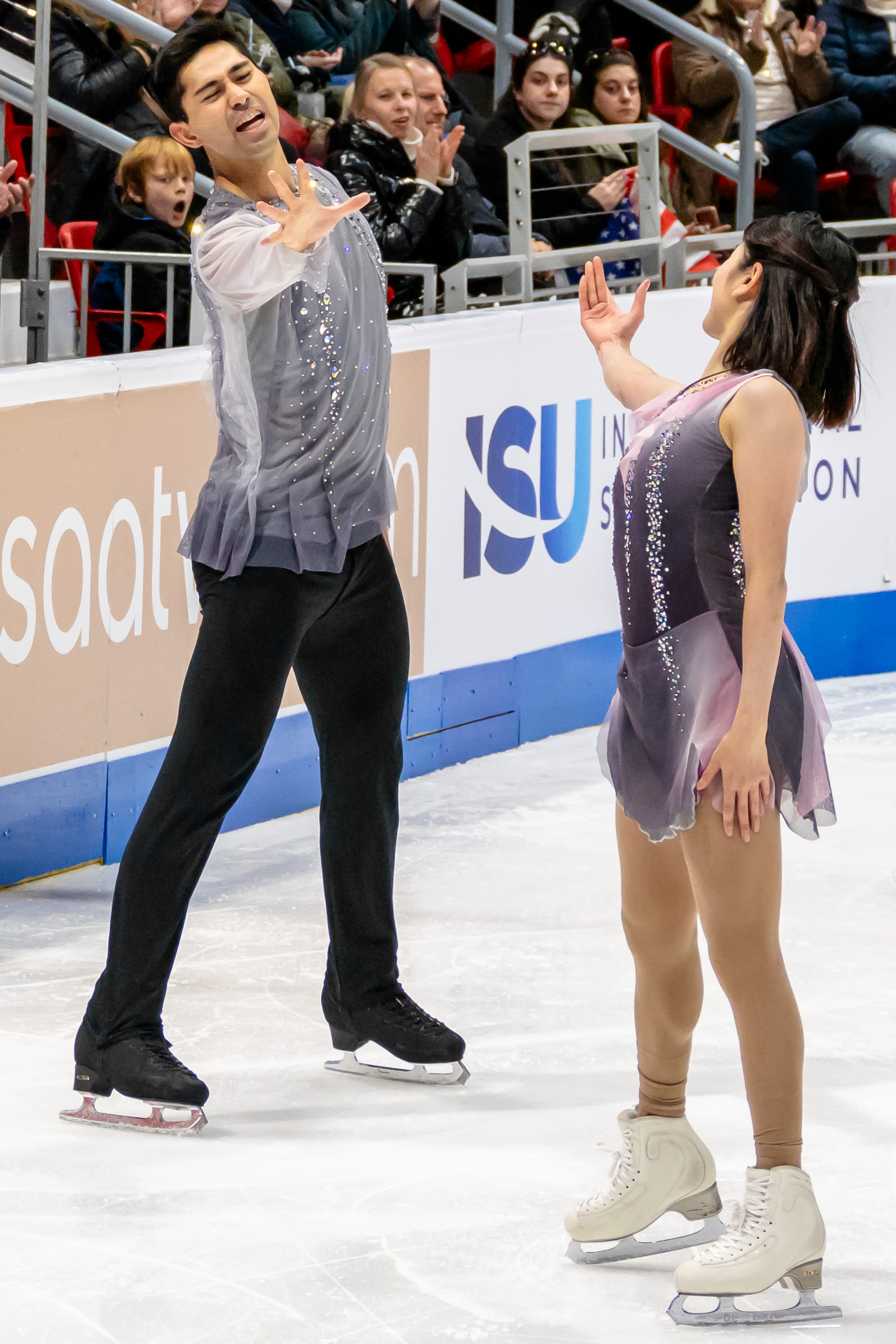
- Howe (left) and Emily Chan at 2025 Skate America

Personal information
- Full name: Spencer Akira Howe
- Born: September 11, 1996 (age 30) Burbank, California, U.S
- Height: 6 ft 0 in (1.83 m)

Figure skating career
- Country: United States (since 2017); Japan (2016–17); United States (2013–15)
- Discipline: Pair skating (since 2016); Men's singles (2013–15)
- Partner: Audrey Shin (since 2026); Emily Chan (2020-26); Nadine Wang (2017–18); Ami Koga (2016–17)
- Coach: Alexei Letov; Olga Ganicheva
- Began skating: 2006

Medal record
Representing United States
Four Continents Championships
Silver medal – second place	2022 Tallinn	Pairs
Silver medal – second place	2023 Colorado Springs	Pairs
U.S. Championships
Silver medal – second place	2023 San Jose	Pairs

Spencer Akira Howe (born September 11, 1996) is an American pair skater. With his skating partner Audrey Shin, he is the 2026 Finlandia Trophy bronze medalist.

With his former skating partner, Emily Chan, he is a two-time Four Continents silver medalist (2022 and 2023), a two-time Grand Prix silver medalist (2022 Skate America; 2022 NHK Trophy), three-time Challenger Series medalist, and a four-time U.S. National medalist (pewter in 2022, 2025, and 2026; silver in 2023).

== Early life ==
Howe was born on September 11, 1996, in Burbank, California. He was born to Katherine, who was born in Japan, and James Howe, a Caucasian-American. He has an older sister named Roxette.

== Career ==
=== Early years ===
Howe began figure skating in 2006 at the age of nine after following his sister, who later became an ice dancer, into the sport.

Early in his pairs career, Howe competed in partnership with Ami Koga for Japan. They were coached by Richard Gauthier, Bruno Marcotte, Sylvie Fullum, and Cynthia Lemaire in Saint-Leonard, Quebec, Canada, and appeared at two ISU Junior Grand Prix events in 2016.

Competing with Nadine Wang, Howe finished fourth in junior pairs at the 2018 U.S. Championships. Their partnership dissolved shortly after.

Following the end of his partnership with Wang, Howe moved from Saint-Leonard, Quebec to his hometown of Los Angeles, California, considering retirement due to a recurring shoulder injury that he was struggling with at the time. However, he was contacted by the president of U.S. Figure Skating, asking if he would try out with Emily Chan, who was looking for a partner at the time and he agreed.

=== Partnership with Chan ===
==== Early years ====
Howe teamed up with Chan in 2019, and the two decided to train at the Skating Club of Boston in Norwood, Massachusetts, coached by Aleksey Letov and Olga Ganicheva. In their second season together, Chan/Howe placed seventh at the 2020 Skate America and fifth at the 2021 U.S. Championships.

==== 2021–22 season: Four Continents silver ====
Chan/Howe finished ninth at the 2021 CS Warsaw Cup. In January, they won pewter for fourth place at the 2022 U.S. Championships and were sent to the 2022 Four Continents Championships in Tallinn, Estonia. Ranked third in the short and second in the free, they moved ahead of Canada's Walsh/Michaud to take the silver medal behind fellow Americans Lu/Mitrofanov.

==== 2022–23 season: Second Four Continents silver and two Grand Prix medals ====
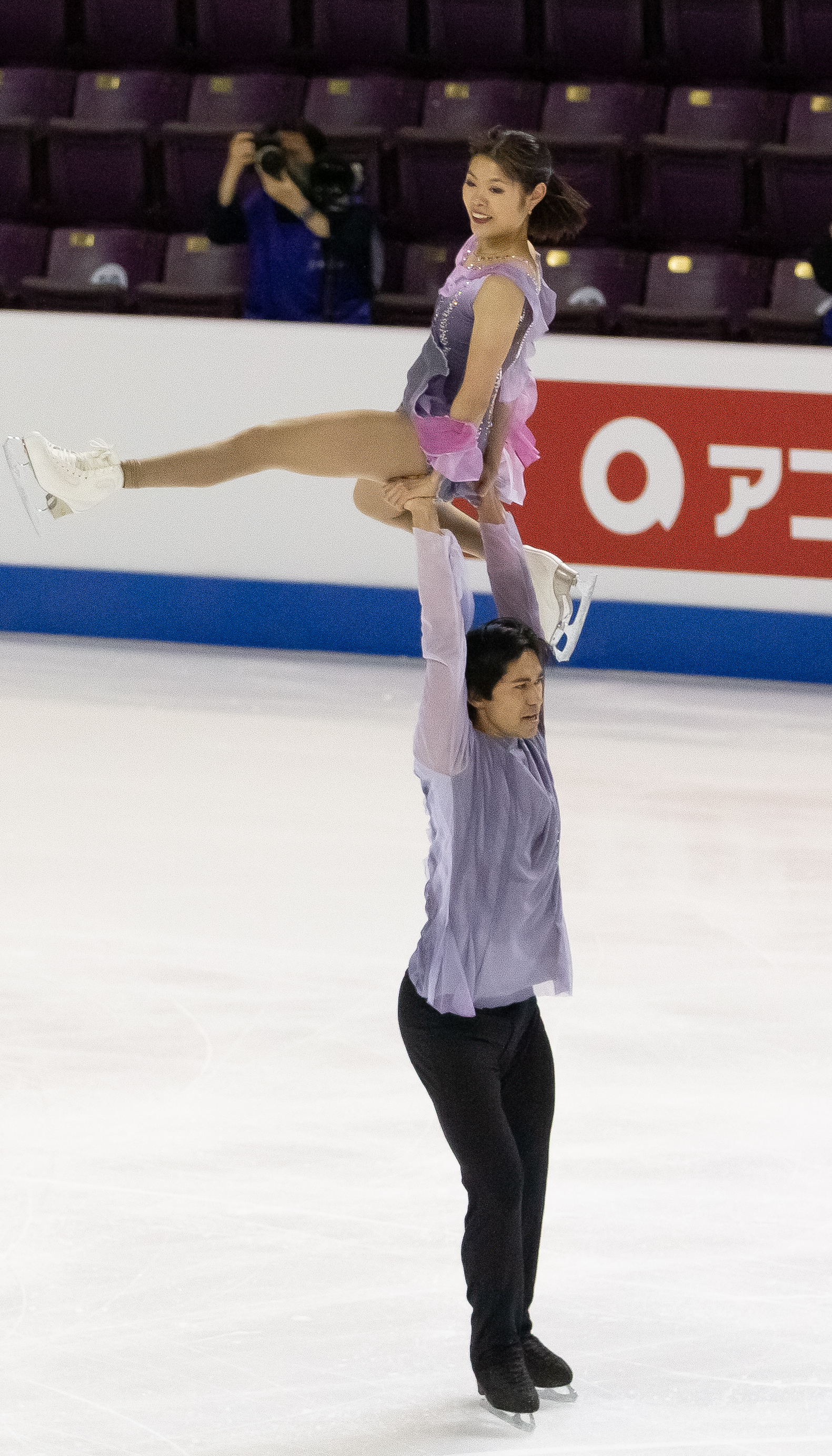
Chan and Howe performing a pair lift at the 2023 Four Continents Championships

The international pairs scene going into the 2022–23 season was greatly altered by the International Skating Union banning all Russian skaters in response to their country's invasion of Ukraine. With more podium opportunities for pairs outside of Russia, Chan/Howe began with a silver medal win at the 2022 CS U.S. Classic. Howe said that they were pleased with the outcome in light of injury troubles that had hindered their preparations.

Given two Grand Prix assignments for the first time, they won the silver medal at the 2022 Skate Canada International. They won a second silver medal weeks later at the 2022 NHK Trophy, qualifying for the Grand Prix Final. Despite a jump error in the free skate, Chan said they were "very happy with our skate." Chan/Howe struggled at the Final, finishing sixth of six teams.

Chan/Howe won the silver medal at the 2023 U.S. Championships, a new best podium placement at the national championships. Chan said they were both "really grateful" for the result. With national champions Knierim/Frazier declining to attend the 2023 Four Continents Championships in favour of a paid appearance at Art on Ice, Chan/Howe became the highest-ranked American team in attendance at a home ISU championship. In the short program, Howe fell on his triple toe attempt, but they still placed third in the segment. In the free skate, they overtook Canadians Stellato/Deschamps for the silver medal, their second. Chan called it "a special moment for both of us."

Chan/Howe concluded their season by making their World Championship debut, finishing fifth at the 2023 edition in Saitama.

==== 2023–24 season: Struggles with injuries ====
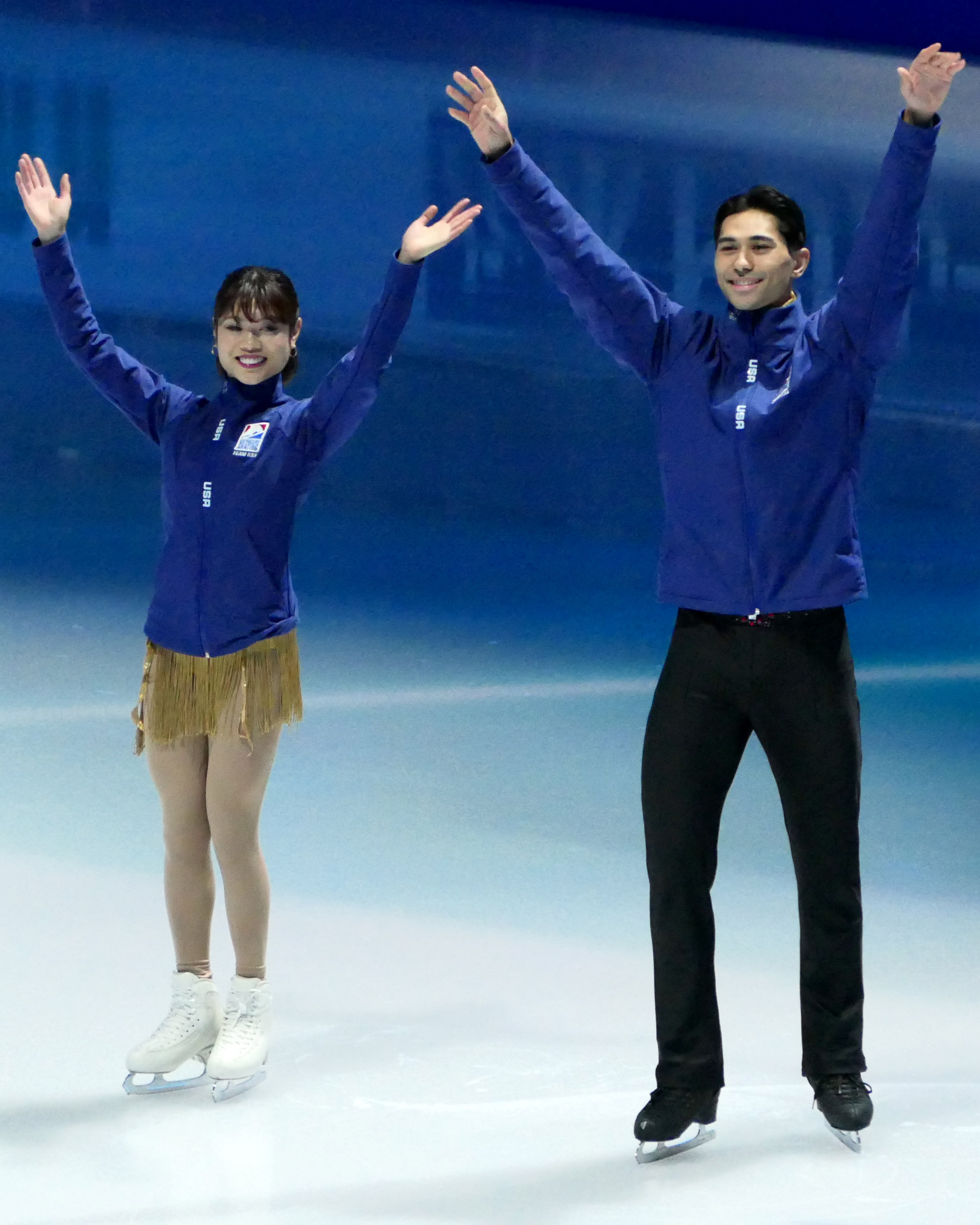
Chan and Howe prior to their short program at the 2024 World Championships

For most of the 2022–23 season, Howe had been dealing what was eventually revealed to be a torn labrum, which necessitated surgery in May 2023. Chan and Howe resumed training together in July, and initially hoped to be ready to compete on the Grand Prix circuit in the fall. However, they subsequently had to withdraw from their assignments, as Howe's return to readiness proved slower than they had hoped. He would later say that the process was about getting "to a place where it’s like, oh, wow, this is what it feels like to actually be able to skate and not always be dealing and managing with pain."

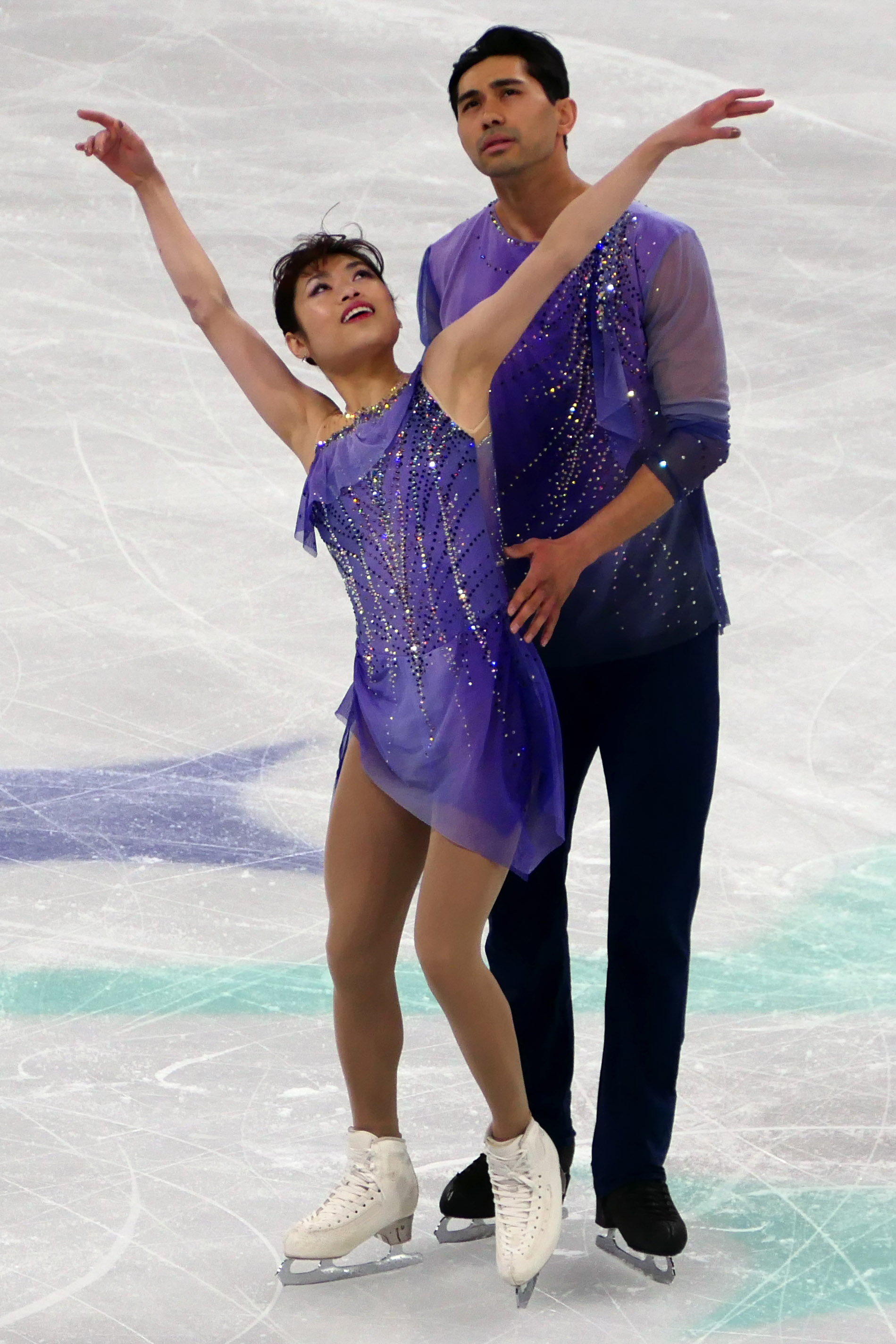
Chan and Howe performing their free skate at the 2024 World Championships

Chan/Howe announced that they would return to competition at the 2024 U.S. Championships in Columbus. Despite Chan putting a hand down on the pair's throw loop in the short program, they won the segment by 1.29 points over Kam/O'Shea. Afterward, they announced their withdrawal in advance of the free skate. Howe explained that the short program was "a big success for us, and a huge milestone to our comeback, but we feel we want to take this time to continue to get healthy and set ourselves up for success."

Despite their withdrawal from the national championships, Chan/Howe were named to the American team from the 2024 World Championships in Montreal, Quebec, Canada. They came twelfth in the short program, having had issues on their throw and spins. Thirteenth in the free skate, they finished twelfth overall. Chan viewed the result as "amazing for us," explaining that "last year we had a great debut. This year, we have a little bit different circumstances, but we're here and we're grateful."

==== 2024–25 season ====
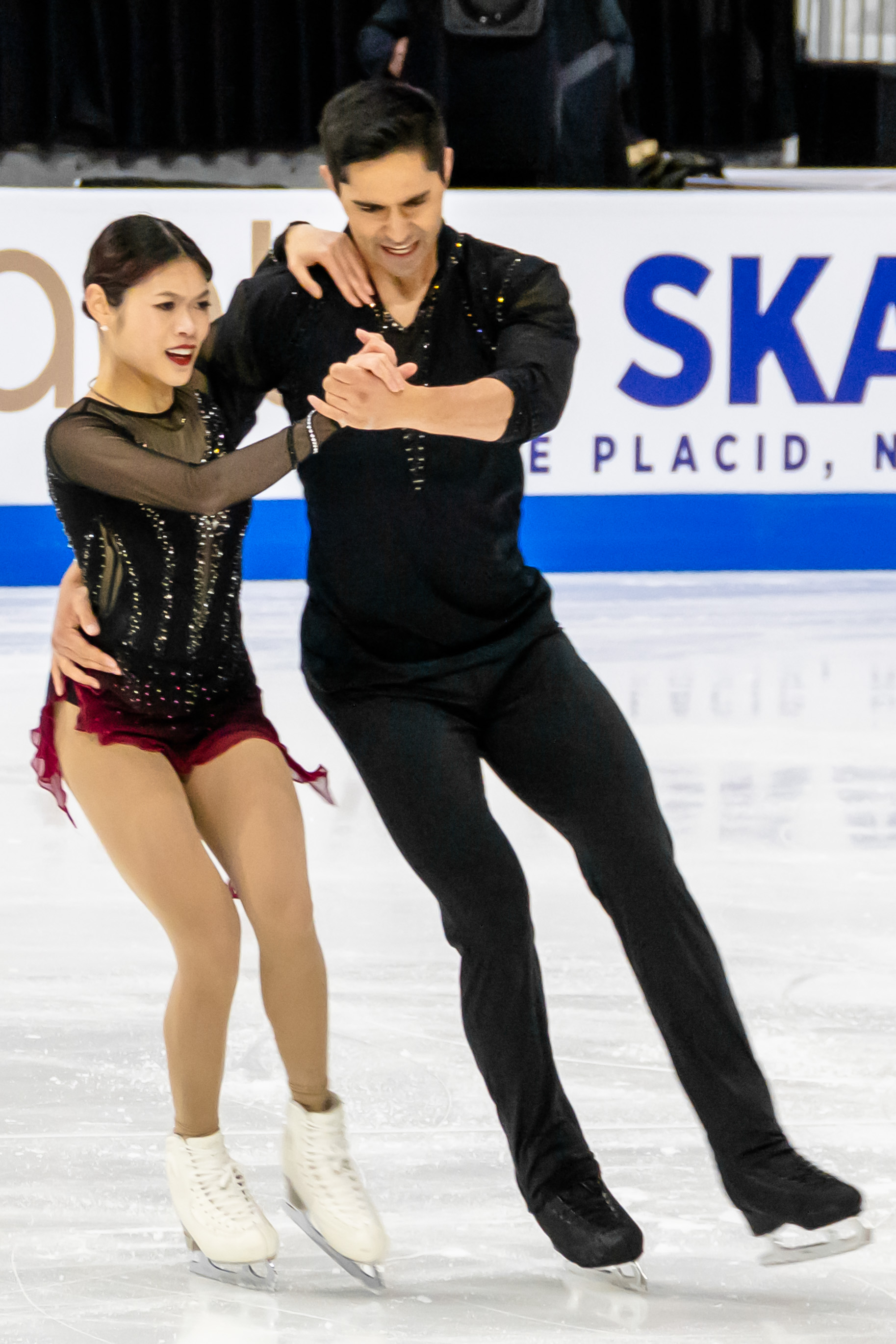
Chan and Howe performing their short program at 2025 Skate America

Although assigned to compete at the 2024 CS John Nicks International Pairs Competition and the 2024 CS Lombardia Trophy, the pair withdrew from both events. Making their first appearance at the 2024 Shanghai Trophy, Chan/Howe finished fourth.

Going on to compete on the 2024–25 Grand Prix series, Chan/Howe finished fifth at 2024 Skate Canada International and at the 2024 Finlandia Trophy. They would follow these results up with a silver medal at the 2024 CS Golden Spin of Zagreb.

Chan/Howe finished this season by finishing fourth at the 2025 U.S. Championships. "I think we are definitely disappointed just because we worked so hard for this,” said Howe. “I felt like where we came into this competition was a lot different from the other competitions this season. I mean, I guess it’s humbling. Sometimes, you can be as trained as you want, but it goes down to that moment. I will say that this year, we were really fighting for that second world spot, especially after the short.”

==== 2025–26 season: Milano Cortina Olympics ====
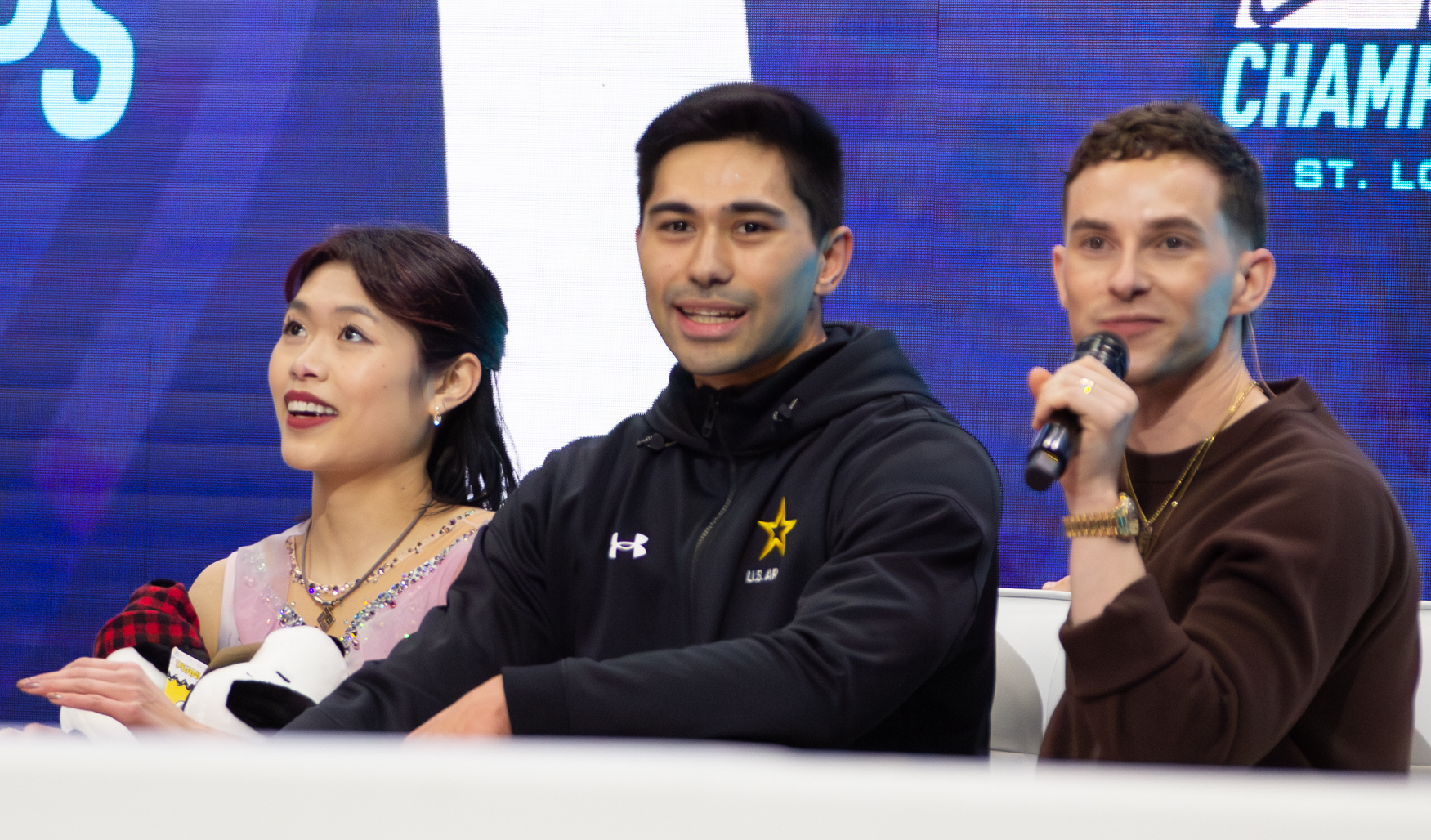
Chan and Howe being interviewed by Adam Rippon at the 2026 U.S. Championships

Chan/Howe opened the season by competing on the 2025–26 Challenger Series, finishing fourth at the 2025 CS John Nicks International Pairs Competition and winning bronze at the 2025 CS Trialeti Trophy. They then competed on the 2025–26 Grand Prix series, finishing sixth at the 2025 NHK Trophy and fourth at 2025 Skate America.

In January, Chan/Howe competed at the 2026 U.S. Championships. They placed eighth of the ten skaters in the short program following an error-ridden program. Chan/Howe subsequently delivered a stronger free program, however, placing third in that competition segment and moving up to fourth place overall. Due to gold medalist, Alisa Efimova, and bronze medalist, Daniil Parkman, not having U.S. citizenship, Chan/Howe were awarded the second pair skating spot for the 2026 Winter Olympics.

The following month, Chan/Howe placed seventh overall at the 2026 Winter Olympics. “There was so much pressure on trying to get to the Games,” said Howe. He also added, “And here, now that we made it, it’s that pressure of being able to skate great performances in front of such a large crowd. We worked so hard to get to this stage. And once you make it, your brain doesn’t know how to process that. It’s hard to explain. We just felt grateful to be here and to be able to skate as well as we did. It’s a huge blessing for us.”

In March, Kam/O'Shea withdrew from the 2026 World Championships due to injury. Chan/Howe were called up to compete. They placed sixth in the short program and twentieth in the free skate, finishing sixteenth overall.

=== Partnership with Audrey Shin ===
==== 2026–2027 season: Grand Prix bronze ====
On June 13, Audrey Shin announced on Instagram that she and Howe had formed a new partnership.

The pair made their competitive debut at the 2026 John Nicks Pairs Challenge, where they finished second, ahead of Nagy and his new partner, Katie McBeath.

Shin and Howe then made their ISU Grand Prix debut at the 2026 Skate America, where they placed sixth.

The following week, they won the free skate and placed third overall at the 2026 Finlandia Trophy, earning Shin her first ever Grand Prix medal as a pairs skater. “We didn’t even know we’d be competing here until about three days ago,” said Howe. “To come here and deliver one of our best performances so far, especially as a new team, shows that we’re making really good progress. We’re incredibly grateful for these opportunities.”

=== Coaching ===
As of 2022, Howe coaches both figure skating and hockey at The Skating Club of Boston, where he trains.

== Personal life ==
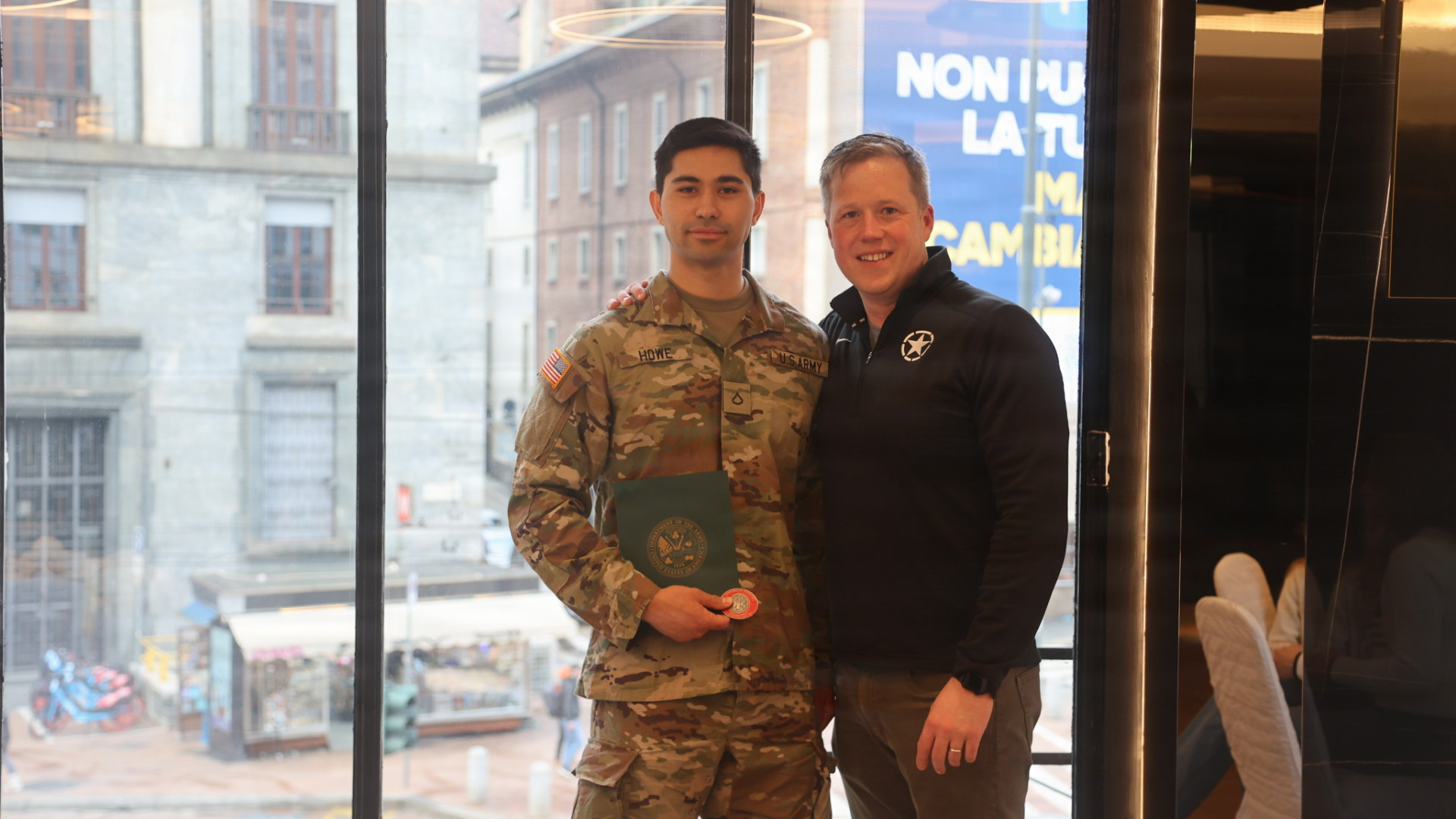
Howe (left) with United States Secretary of the Army Daniel P. Driscoll at his promotion ceremony held during the 2026 Winter Olympics

In October 2024, Howe enlisted in the United States Army and subsequently became a member of the U.S. Army World Class Athlete Program.

== Programs ==
=== Pair skating with Emily Chan ===
Season	Short program	Free skating	Exhibition
2019–20	Je Crois Entendre Encore by Alison Moyet choreo. by Olga Ganicheva	On the Nature of Daylight by Max Richter choreo. by Olga Ganicheva	
2020–21	Onmyoji II by Shigeru Umebayashi choreo. by Olga Ganicheva	The Prayer by David Foster, Carole Bayer Sager, Alberto Testa, & Tony Renis performed by Andrea Bocelli, Celine Dion choreo. by Olga Ganicheva	
2021–22	Nyah (from Mission: Impossible 2) by Hans Zimmer performed by CH2 choreo. by Olga Ganicheva	Elegy For The Arctic; Divenire by Ludovico Einaudi choreo. by Olga Ganicheva	Something's Got to Give by Labrinth
2022–23	Nyah (from Mission: Impossible 2) by Hans Zimmer performed by CH2 choreo. by Olga Ganicheva	Ghost: The Musical; Unchained Melody / The Love Inside performed by Richard Fleeshman & Caissie Levy; Unchained Melody performed by Marc Martel choreo. by Olga Ganicheva	Something's Got to Give by Labrinth
2023–24	Craw-Fever; I Got a Feelin' in My Body by Elvis Presley choreo. by Olga Ganicheva	Exogenesis: Symphony Part 3 by Muse choreo. by Olga Ganicheva	
2024–25	Give Me Love by Ed Sheeran choreo. by Olga Ganicheva, Renée Roca	lo Ci Saro by Andrea Bocelli & Lang Lang choreo. by Olga Ganicheva, Renée Roca	Vincent by Don McLean performed by Josh Groban
2025–26	Nyah (from Mission: Impossible 2) by Hans Zimmer performed by CH2 choreo. by Olga Ganicheva; Caruso by Lucio Dalla performed by Josh Groban choreo. by Olga Ganicheva	Ghost: The Musical; Unchained Melody / The Love Inside performed by Richard Fleeshman & Caissie Levy; Unchained Melody performed by Marc Martel choreo. by Olga Ganicheva	Vincent by Don McLean performed by Josh Groban

=== Pair skating with Ami Koga ===
Season	Short program	Free skating
2016–17	Yesterday by Paul McCartney; Yesterday (from André Rieu Celebrates ABBA – Music of the Night) choreo. by Julie Marcotte	Ryōmaden by Naoki Satō choreo. by Julie Marcotte

== Competitive highlights ==
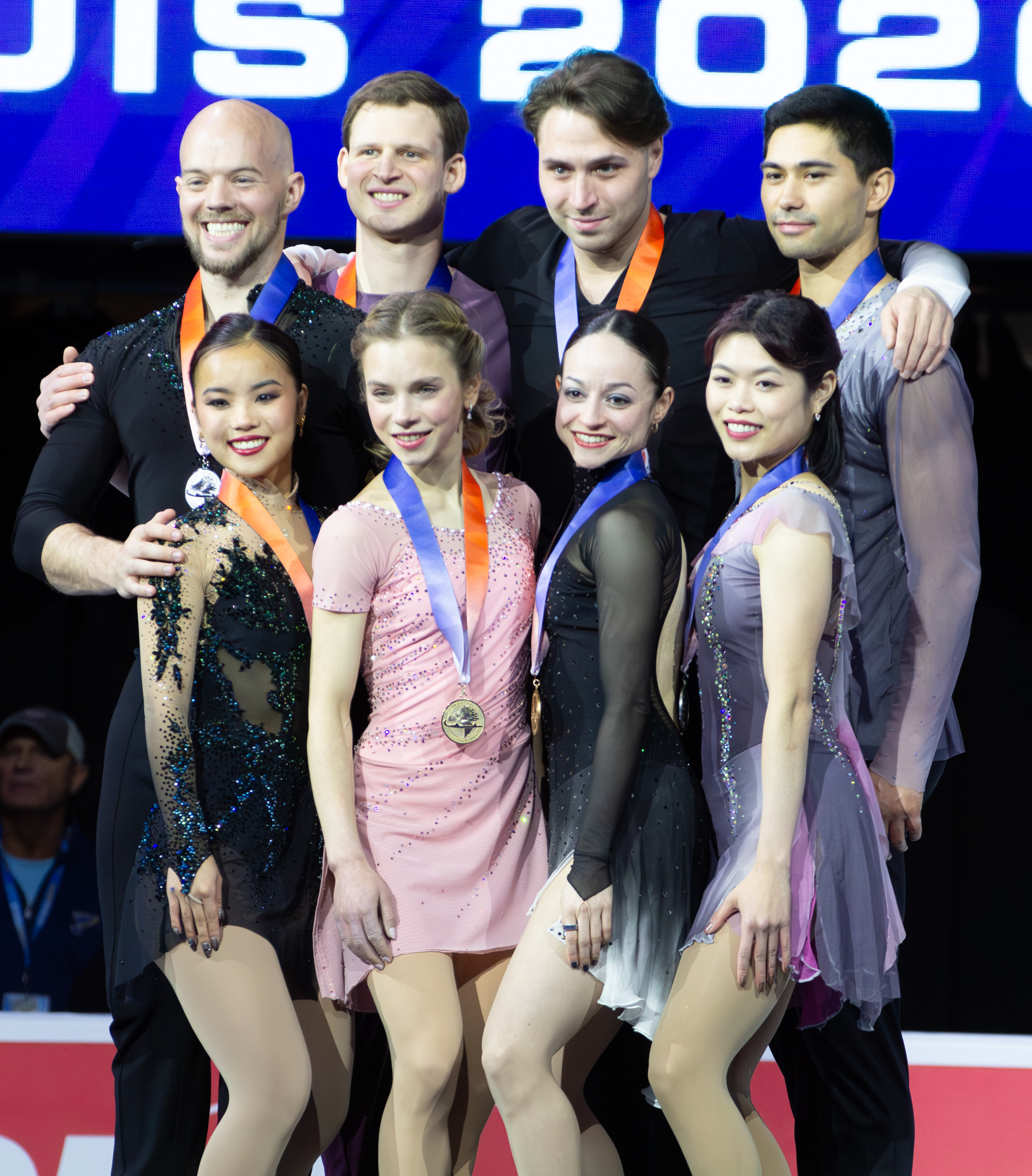
Chan and Howe (far right) during the medal ceremony at the 2026 U.S. Championships

- GP – Event of the ISU Grand Prix Series
- JGP – Event of the ISU Junior Grand Prix Series
- CS – Event of the ISU Challenger Series
- TBD – Assigned
- WD – Withdrew from competition

=== Pair skating with Audrey Shin (for the United States) ===
Competition placements at senior level
Season	2026–27
GP Finland	3rd
GP Skate America	6th
CS John Nicks Pairs	2nd
CS Nebelhorn Trophy	2nd

=== Pair skating with Emily Chan (for the United States) ===
Competition placements at senior level
Season	2020–21	2021–22	2022–23	2023–24	2024–25	2025–26
Winter Olympics						7th
World Championships			5th	12th		16th
Four Continents Championships		2nd	2nd			
Grand Prix Final			6th			
U.S. Championships	5th	4th	2nd	WD	4th	4th
GP Finland					5th	
GP NHK Trophy			2nd			6th
GP Skate America	7th					4th
GP Skate Canada			2nd		5th	
CS Golden Spin of Zagreb					2nd	
CS John Nicks Pairs						4th
CS Trialeti Trophy						3rd
CS U.S. Classic			2nd			
CS Warsaw Cup		9th				
Cranberry Cup		4th				
John Nicks Pairs		6th	2nd			
Shanghai Trophy					4th	

=== Pair skating with Nadine Wang (for the United States) ===
Competition placements at junior level
Season	2017–18
U.S. Championships	4th
Mentor Cup	2nd

=== Pair skating with Ami Koga (for Japan) ===
Competition placements at junior level
Season	2016–17
JGP Czech Republic	9th
JGP Germany	8th

=== Single skating (for the United States) ===
Competition placements at junior level
Season	2013–14	2014–15
U.S. Championships	8th	6th
JGP Belarus	15th	
JGP Estonia		12th

== Detailed results ==
=== Pair skating with Audrey Shin (for the United States) ===
ISU personal best scores in the +5/-5 GOE System
Segment	Type	Score	Event
Total	TSS	193.18	2026 Finlandia Trophy
Short program	TSS	67.26	2026 Finlandia Trophy
Short program	TES	37.00	2026 Finlandia Trophy
Short program	PCS	30.86	2026 CS John Nicks Pairs Challenge
Free skating	TSS	125.92	2026 Finlandia Trophy
Free skating	TES	62.03	2026 Finlandia Trophy
Free skating	PCS	63.89	2026 Finlandia Trophy

Results in the 2026–27 season
Date	Event	SP		FS		Total	
Date	Event	P	Score	P	Score	P	Score
Sep 11–12, 2026	(United States) 2026 CS John Nicks Pairs Challenge	3	67.25	2	116.56	2	183.81
Sep 24–26, 2026	(Germany) 2026 CS Nebelhorn Trophy	2	66.46	3	111.37	2	177.83
Nov 13–15, 2026	(United States) 2026 Skate America	6	64.86	6	106.32	6	171.18
Nov 20–21, 2026	(Finland) 2026 Finlandia Trophy	4	67.26	1	125.92	3	193.18

=== Pair skating with Emily Chan (for the United States) ===
ISU personal best scores in the +5/-5 GOE System
Segment	Type	Score	Event
Total	TSS	201.11	2023 Four Continents Championships
Short program	TSS	71.17	2025 CS Trialeti Trophy
Short program	TES	40.24	2025 CS Trialeti Trophy
Short program	PCS	32.44	2023 World Championships
Free skating	TSS	134.15	2023 Four Continents Championships
Free skating	TES	68.50	2026 Winter Olympics
Free skating	PCS	66.05	2023 Four Continents Championships

- Small medals for the short program and free skating are only awarded at ISU Championships.
- At national events in the United States, pewter medals are awarded for fourth place.

Results in the 2020–21 season
Date	Event	SP		FS		Total	
Date	Event	P	Score	P	Score	P	Score
Oct 23–24, 2020	(United States) 2020 Skate America	7	55.58	8	95.57	7	151.15
Jan 11–21, 2021	(United States) 2021 U.S. Championships	5	60.41	5	116.65	5	177.06

Results in the 2021–22 season
Date	Event	SP		FS		Total	
Date	Event	P	Score	P	Score	P	Score
Aug 11–15, 2021	(United States) 2021 Cranberry Cup International	4	63.61	4	118.83	4	182.44
Sep 9–10, 2021	(United States) 2021 John Nicks Pairs Challenge	6	59.77	6	110.31	6	170.08
Nov 17–20, 2021	(Poland) 2021 CS Warsaw Cup	12	56.94	8	106.45	9	163.39
Jan 3–9, 2022	(United States) 2022 U.S. Championships	4	61.94	5	115.31	4	177.25
Jan 18–23, 2022	(Estonia) 2022 Four Continents Championships	3	64.47	2	116.47	2	180.94

Results in the 2022–23 season
Date	Event	SP		FS		Total	
Date	Event	P	Score	P	Score	P	Score
Sep 8–10, 2022	(United States) 2022 John Nicks Pairs Challenge	2	60.45	2	113.64	2	174.09
Sep 12–16, 2022	(United States) 2022 CS U.S. International Classic	2	61.71	2	120.10	2	181.81
Oct 28–20, 2022	2022 Skate Canada International	2	67.39	3	119.09	2	186.48
Nov 18–20, 2022	(Japan) 2022 NHK Trophy	2	64.62	2	122.87	2	187.49
Dec 8–11, 2022	(Italy) 2022–23 Grand Prix Final	6	53.85	6	109.06	6	162.91
Jan 23–29, 2023	(United States) 2023 U.S. Championships	2	66.86	2	130.00	2	196.86
Feb 7–12, 2023	(United States) 2023 Four Continents Championships	3	66.96	2	134.15	2	201.11
Mar 20–26, 2023	(Japan) 2023 World Championships	5	70.23	8	124.50	5	194.73

Results in the 2023–24 season
Date	Event	SP		FS		Total	
Date	Event	P	Score	P	Score	P	Score
Jan 22–28, 2024	(United States) 2024 U.S. Championships	1	65.86	—N/a	—N/a	–	WD
Mar 18–24, 2024	(Canada) 2024 World Championships	12	62.86	13	112.58	12	175.44

Results in the 2024–25 season
Date	Event	SP		FS		Total	
Date	Event	P	Score	P	Score	P	Score
Oct 3–5, 2024	(China) 2024 Shanghai Trophy	4	50.50	3	105.14	4	155.64
Oct 25–27, 2024	2024 Skate Canada International	5	61.04	5	117.27	5	178.31
Nov 15–17, 2024	(Finland) 2024 Finlandia Trophy	5	58.93	5	115.47	5	174.40
Dec 5–7, 2024	(Croatia) 2024 CS Golden Spin of Zagreb	1	65.13	2	112.57	2	177.70
Jan 20–26, 2025	(United States) 2025 U.S. Championships	2	69.10	4	114.85	4	183.95

Results in the 2025–26 season
Date	Event	SP		FS		Total	
Date	Event	P	Score	P	Score	P	Score
Sep 2–3, 2025	(United States) 2025 CS John Nicks International Pairs Competition	4	65.58	4	117.64	4	183.22
Oct 8–11, 2025	(Georgia (country)) 2025 CS Trialeti Trophy	3	71.17	4	122.53	3	193.70
Nov 7–9, 2025	(Japan) 2025 NHK Trophy	6	63.82	6	123.58	6	187.40
Nov 14–16, 2025	(United States) 2025 Skate America	5	61.51	3	118.51	4	180.02
Jan 4–11, 2026	(United States) 2026 U.S. Championships	8	59.29	3	127.23	4	186.52
Feb 6–19, 2026	(Italy) 2026 Winter Olympics	9	70.06	7	130.25	7	200.31
Mar 24–29, 2026	(Czech Republic) 2026 World Championships	6	69.02	20	100.89	16	169.91
