= 2026 U.S. Figure Skating Championships =

Figure skating competition

- Type: National championships
- Date: January 4 – 11
- Season: 2025–26
- Location: St. Louis, Missouri
- Host: U.S. Figure Skating
- Venue: Enterprise Center and Centene Community Ice Center

Champions
- Men's singles: Ilia Malinin (Senior) & Patrick Blackwell (Junior)
- Women's singles: Amber Glenn (Senior) & Angela Shao (Junior)
- Pairs: Alisa Efimova and Misha Mitrofanov (Senior) & Reagan Moss and Jakub Galbavy (Junior)
- Ice dance: Madison Chock and Evan Bates (Senior) & Hana Maria Aboian and Daniil Veselukhin (Junior)
- Previous: 2025 U.S. Championships
- Next: 2027 U.S. Championships

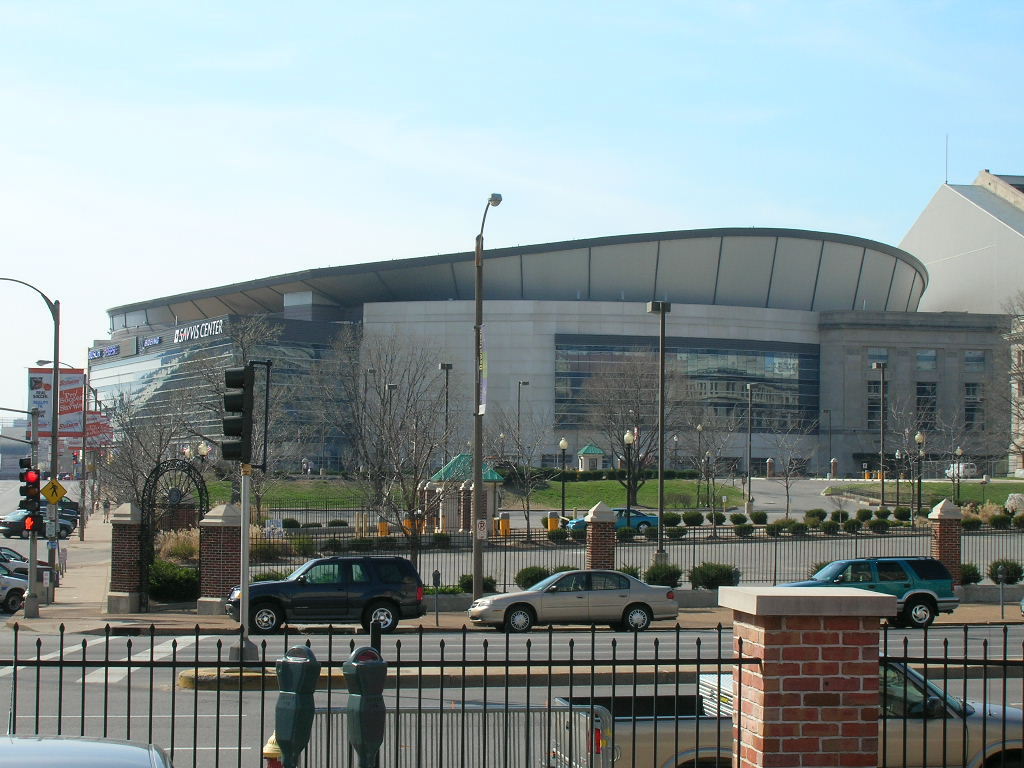
The 2026 U.S. Figure Skating Championships were held at the Enterprise Center in St. Louis, Missouri.

The 2026 U.S. Figure Skating Championships were held from January 4 to 11 at the Enterprise Center and Centene Community Ice Center in St. Louis, Missouri. Medals were awarded in men's singles, women's singles, pair skating, and ice dance at the junior and senior levels. The results were part of the U.S. selection criteria for the 2026 Winter Olympics, 2026 World Championships, 2026 Four Continents Championships, and 2026 World Junior Championships.

At the senior level, Ilia Malinin won the men's event, Amber Glenn won the women's event, Alisa Efimova and Misha Mitrofanov won the pairs event, and Madison Chock and Evan Bates won the ice dance event. With their seventh victory, Chock and Bates set a new record for winning the most U.S. Championship titles in ice dance. At the junior level, Patrick Blackwell won the men's event, Angela Shao won the women's event, Reagan Moss and Jakub Galbavy won the pairs event, and Hana Maria Aboian and Daniil Veselukhin won the ice dance event.

== Background ==
The U.S. Figure Skating Championships are an annual figure skating competition organized by U.S. Figure Skating to crown the national champions of the United States. The first U.S. Championships were held in 1914. The 2026 U.S. Championships were held from January 4 to 11. All junior-level events took place at the Centene Community Ice Center in Maryland Heights, Missouri, while all senior-level events took place at the Enterprise Center in St. Louis.

== Qualification ==
Skaters qualified for the U.S. Figure Skating Championships by either having a bye or by competing at the Pacific Coast Sectional Finals, Eastern Sectional Finals, Midwestern Sectional Finals, U.S. Ice Dance Finals, or U.S. Pairs Finals.

Senior-level skaters were eligible for a bye if they met any of the following criteria:

- Placing in the top five at the 2025 U.S. Figure Skating Championships
- Selection to the 2025 World Championship team
- Winning a medal at the 2022 Winter Olympics
- Qualifying for the same event at the Grand Prix Final or the Junior Grand Prix Final
- Competing at three international assignments classified as an ISU Grand Prix, ISU Junior Grand Prix, or ISU Challenger Series event

Junior-level skaters were eligible for a bye if they met any of the following criteria:

- Qualifying for the same event at the Junior Grand Prix Final
- Competing at three international assignments classified as an ISU Junior Grand Prix or ISU Challenger Series event

After accounting for all byes, the top placements from the Singles Sectionals, U.S. Pairs Finals, or U.S. Ice Dance Finals were then assigned until the maximum number of competitors for each event (eighteen in men's singles, eighteen in women's singles, twelve in pairs, and fifteen in ice dance) was met.

== Changes to preliminary assignments ==
U.S. Figure Skating published the initial list of entrants on November 26, 2025.

Changes to preliminary entries
Date	Discipline	Withdrew	Added	Notes	Ref.
December 1	Senior pairs	Sydney Cooke; Matthew Kennedy	—N/a		
December 29	Senior women	Ava Marie Ziegler	Alina Bonillo	—N/a	
December 29	Junior ice dance	Effie Chen; Gordei Chitipakhovian	Annie Huang; Simon Mintz	—N/a	
December 31	Senior men	Camden Pulkinen	Ken Mikawa	Back injury	
January 3	Junior men	Aleksandr Fegan	Henry Gao	—N/a	

== Required performance elements ==
=== Single skating ===
Men and women competing in single skating first performed a short program. Junior men and women performed their short programs on January 5. Senior women performed their short programs on January 7, while senior men performed theirs on January 8. Lasting 2 minutes 40 seconds (+/− 10 seconds), the short program had to include the following elements:

For junior men: one double or triple Axel, one double or triple loop, one jump combination consisting of a double jump and a triple jump or two triple jumps, one flying sit spin, one camel spin with a change of foot, one spin combination with a change of foot, and a step sequence using the full ice surface.

For senior men: one double or triple Axel; one triple or quadruple jump; one jump combination consisting of a double jump and a triple jump, two triple jumps, or a quadruple jump and a double jump or triple jump; one flying spin; one camel spin or sit spin with a change of foot; one spin combination with a change of foot; and a step sequence using the full ice surface.

For junior women: one double Axel; one double or triple loop; one jump combination consisting of two double jumps, one double jump and one triple jump, or two triple jumps; one flying sit spin; one layback spin, sideways leaning spin, or camel spin without a change of foot; one spin combination with a change of foot; and one step sequence using the full ice surface.

For senior women: one double or triple Axel; one triple jump; one jump combination consisting of a double jump and a triple jump, or two triple jumps; one flying spin; one layback spin, sideways leaning spin, camel spin, or sit spin without a change of foot; one spin combination with a change of foot; and one step sequence using the full ice surface.

Men and women in single skating finished their competition with free skating. Junior men and women performed their free skates on January 6. Senior women performed their free skates on January 9, while senior men performed theirs on January 10. Lasting 4 minutes (+/− 10 seconds), the free skate had to include the following:

For junior men and women: seven jump elements, of which one had to be an Axel-type jump; three spins, of which one had to be a spin combination, one a flying spin, and one a spin with only one position; and a choreographic sequence.

For senior men and women: seven jump elements, of which one had to be an Axel-type jump; three spins, of which one had to be a spin combination, one a flying spin, and one a spin with only one position; a step sequence; and a choreographic sequence.

=== Pair skating ===
Couples competing in pair skating also first performed a short program. Junior teams performed their short programs on January 5, while senior teams performed theirs on January 7. Lasting 2 minutes 40 seconds (+/− 10 seconds), the short program had to include the following elements:

For junior couples: one pair lift, one double or triple twist lift, one double or triple toe loop or flip/Lutz throw jump, one double loop or double Axel solo jump, one solo spin combination with a change of foot, one death spiral, and a step sequence using the full ice surface.

For senior couples: one pair lift, one double or triple twist lift, one double or triple throw jump, one double or triple solo jump, one solo spin combination with a change of foot, one death spiral, and a step sequence using the full ice surface.

Junior couples performed their free skates on January 6, while senior couples performed theirs on January 9. Lasting 4 minutes (+/− 10 seconds), the free skate had to include the following:

For junior couples: two pair lifts, one twist lift, two different throw jumps, one solo jump, one jump combination or sequence, one pair spin combination, one death spiral, and a choreographic sequence.

For senior couples: three pair lifts, one twist lift, two different throw jumps, one solo jump, one jump combination or sequence, one pair spin combination, one death spiral, and a choreographic sequence.

=== Ice dance ===
Couples competing in ice dance first performed a rhythm dance. Junior couples performed theirs on January 5, while senior couples performed theirs on January 8. The theme of the rhythm dance this season was "music, dance styles, and feeling of the 1990s". Examples of applicable dance styles and music included pop, Latin, house, techno, hip-hop, and grunge. Lasting 2 minutes 50 seconds (+/− 10 seconds), the rhythm dance had to include the following elements:

For junior couples: one sequence of the rhumba followed immediately by one sequence of the quickstep, one dance lift, one set of sequential twizzles, and one step sequence while not in hold.

For senior couples: one pattern dance step sequence, one choreographic rhythm sequence, one dance lift, one set of sequential twizzles, and one step sequence while not in hold.

Junior ice dance teams performed their free dances on January 6, while senior teams performed theirs on January 10. Lasting 3 minutes 30 seconds for juniors or 4 minutes for seniors (+/− 10 seconds), the free dance had to include the following:

For junior couples: two dance lifts or one combination lift, one dance spin, one set of synchronized twizzles, one step sequence in hold, one turns sequence while on one skate and not in hold, and two choreographic elements.

For senior couples: three dance lifts or one dance lift and one combination lift, one dance spin, one set of synchronized twizzles, one step sequence in hold, one turns sequence while on one skate and not in hold, and three choreographic elements.

== Judging ==
Skaters were judged according to the required technical elements of their program (such as jumps and spins), as well as the overall presentation of their program, based on three program components (skating skills, presentation, and composition). Each technical element in a figure skating performance was assigned a predetermined base point value and scored by a panel of nine judges on a scale from –5 to +5 based on the quality of its execution. Each Grade of Execution (GOE) from –5 to +5 was assigned a value as indicated on the Scale of Values. For example, a triple Axel was worth a base value of 8.00 points, and a GOE of +3 was worth 2.40 points, so a triple Axel with a GOE of +3 earned 10.40 points. The judging panel's GOE for each element was determined by calculating the trimmed mean (the average after discarding the highest and lowest scores). The panel's scores for all elements were added together to generate a Total Elements Score. At the same time, the judges evaluated each performance based on the five aforementioned program components and assigned each a score from 0.25 to 10 in 0.25-point increments. The judging panel's final score for each program component was also determined by calculating the trimmed mean. Those scores were then multiplied by the factor shown on the chart below; the results were added together to generate a total Program Component Score.

Program component factoring
Discipline	Short program or Rhythm dance	Free skate or Free dance
Men	1.67	3.33
Women	1.33	2.67
Pairs	1.33	2.67
Ice dance	1.33	2.00

Deductions were applied for certain violations, such as time infractions or falls. The Total Elements Score and Program Component Score were then added together, minus any deductions, to generate a final performance score for each skater or team.

== Medal summary ==
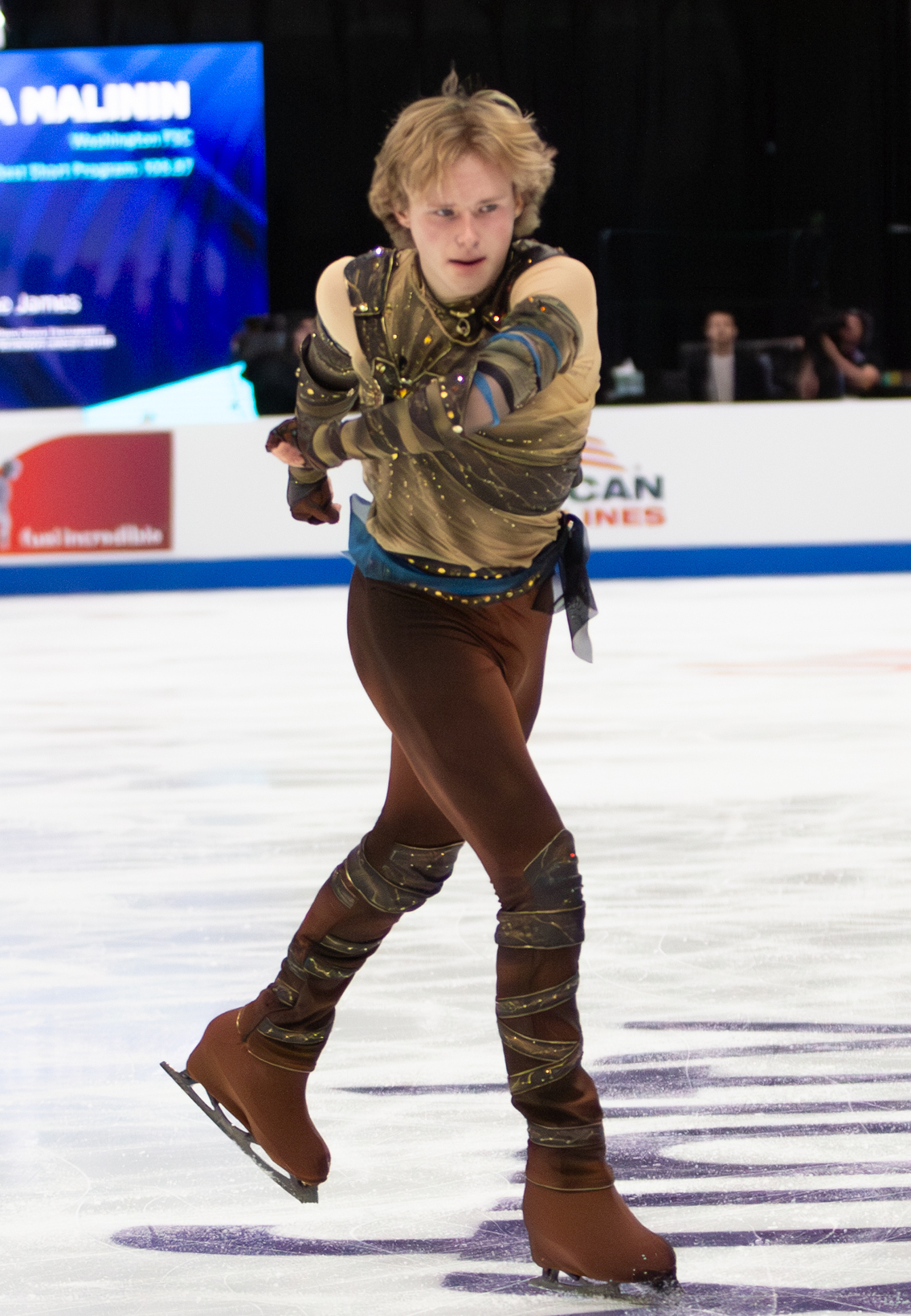
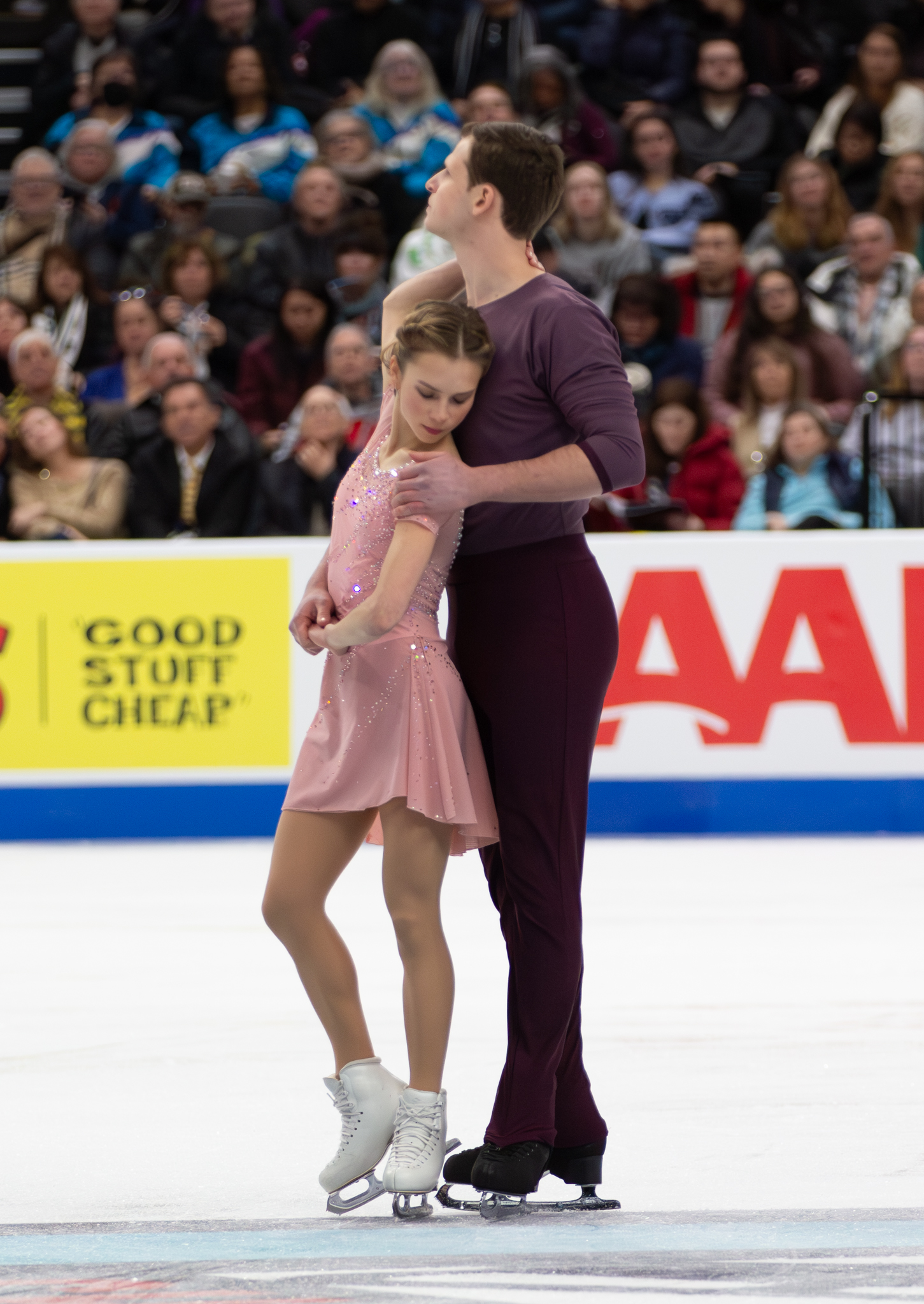
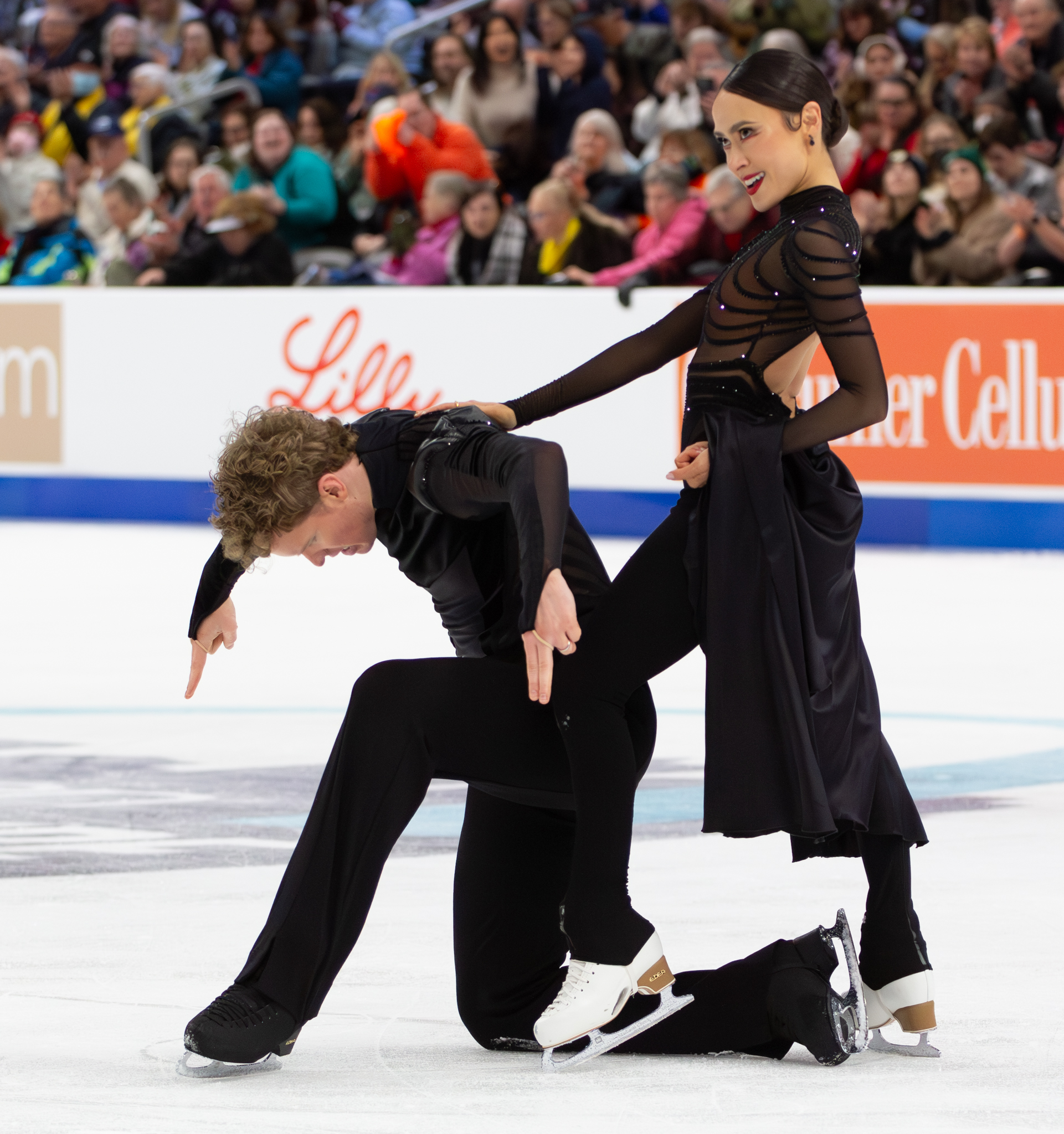
From left to right: The 2026 U.S. champions: Ilia Malinin (men's singles); Amber Glenn (women's singles); Alisa Efimova and Misha Mitrofanov (pair skating); and Madison Chock and Evan Bates (ice dance)

=== Senior medalists ===
Senior medal recipients
Discipline	Gold	Silver	Bronze	Pewter	Ref.
Men	Ilia Malinin	Andrew Torgashev	Maxim Naumov	Jacob Sanchez	
Women	Amber Glenn	Alysa Liu	Isabeau Levito	Bradie Tennell	
Pairs	Alisa Efimova; Misha Mitrofanov	Ellie Kam; Daniel O'Shea	Katie McBeath; Daniil Parkman	Emily Chan; Spencer Akira Howe	
Ice dance	Madison Chock; Evan Bates	Emilea Zingas; Vadym Kolesnik	Christina Carreira; Anthony Ponomarenko	Caroline Green; Michael Parsons	

=== Junior medalists ===
Junior medal recipients
Discipline	Gold	Silver	Bronze	Pewter	Ref.
Men	Patrick Blackwell	Caleb Farrington	Louis Mallane	Nicholas Brooks	
Women	Angela Shao	Annika Chao	Hannah Kim	Jessica Jurka	
Pairs	Reagan Moss; Jakub Galbavy	Sofia Jarmoc; Luke Witkowski	Milada Kovar; Jared McPike	Alena Kerr; Sam Herbert	
Ice dance	Hana Maria Aboian; Daniil Veselukhin	Jasmine Robertson; Chase Rohner	Jane Calhoun; Mark Zheltyshev	Aneta Vaclavikova; William Lissauer	

== Senior results ==
=== Men's singles ===
Ilia Malinin delivered what the Associated Press called a "flawless" short program, securing a 25-point lead over Tomoki Hiwatashi. Malinin's short program included a quadruple flip, a triple Axel, a quadruple Lutz-triple toe loop jump combination, as well as his signature backflip and "raspberry twist". Malinin won the free skate as well, even with a more conservative repertoire of jumps. "Around nationals is when I typically break in new skates and new boots," Malinin said at the end of the competition. "Being as these nationals were closer because of the Olympics, I didn't have a lot of time to get comfortable with them, so it was still kind of in the process where ... sometimes they can be good, other days they can be really uncontrollable. So, I decided to play it safe here, and also to kind of save my energy preparing for the Olympic Games."

Andrew Torgashev finished in second place after he delivered what Talia Barrington of NBC Sports called "the skate of his season" during the free skate. Torgashev delivered cleanly-executed jumps, intricate choreography, and tremendous speed. After finishing in fourth place for three seasons in a row, Maxim Naumov finished in third place. After the short program, Naumov held up a photograph of himself at age three on the ice for the very first time, accompanied by his parents, Evgenia Shishkova and Vadim Naumov. Shishkova and Naumov had died just days after the 2025 U.S. Figure Skating Championships when American Airlines Flight 5342 crashed into the Potomac River. "I was thinking about them," Maxim Naumov said after the short program. “Their smile, their laugh, what they'd say to me, their words; it all replays in my head, especially in times like this."

Malinin, Naumov, and Torgashev were named to the 2026 Winter Olympic team on January 11. "My parents, what we talked about and how much we discussed this through my entire life, and how much it means to us, and how much the Olympics is part of our family," Naumov said after learning he'd been named to the American team. "I thought of them immediately. I wish they could be here to experience it with me." Malinin also spoke of his parents, Tatiana Malinina and Roman Skorniakov, both former Olympians: "They’ve told me so many great stories, how [the Olympics are] just such a different event. And I’m just so excited to go there and to represent Team USA and to hopefully go for that Olympic gold."

Jason Brown, who had been in third place after the short program, had what Scott Bregman of Olympics.com deemed a disappointing free skate, ultimately finishing in eighth place. Brown had been a solid member of the U.S. figure skating team since his senior debut in 2013, most recently helping to secure a third spot in men's singles for the United States at the 2026 Winter Olympics. "I'm just so unbelievably proud of my career," Brown said after the free skate. "I'm so proud of all the times that I represented the U.S. ... of my Worlds, Olympics experiences, and of being such a rock for Team USA throughout my career. That’s something that doesn’t go away based on one event."

Men's results
Rank	Skater	Total	SP		FS	
1st place, gold medalist(s)	Ilia Malinin	324.88	1	115.10	1	209.78
2nd place, silver medalist(s)	Andrew Torgashev	267.62	5	84.99	2	182.63
3rd place, bronze medalist(s)	Maxim Naumov	249.16	4	85.72	4	163.44
4	Jacob Sanchez	249.07	7	81.27	3	167.80
5	Tomoki Hiwatashi	247.24	2	89.26	5	157.98
6	Liam Kapeikis	235.13	8	78.86	6	156.27
7	Daniel Martynov	229.95	6	81.63	10	148.32
8	Jason Brown	227.52	3	88.48	12	139.03
9	Lucius Kazanecki	227.07	10	75.72	7	151.35
10	Kai Kovar	225.75	9	76.91	9	148.84
11	Jimmy Ma	225.71	11	75.56	8	150.15
12	Lorenzo Elano	213.34	13	71.65	11	141.69
13	Goku Endo	203.42	12	72.68	14	130.74
14	Michael Xie	196.78	16	59.95	13	136.83
15	Samuel Mindra	190.04	14	65.02	16	125.02
16	Emmanuel Savary	188.14	15	60.21	15	127.93
17	Will Annis	175.80	17	54.95	17	120.85
18	Ken Mikawa	145.91	18	51.69	18	94.22

=== Women's singles ===
Amber Glenn won both the short program and the free skate, ultimately winning her third consecutive U.S. Championship title. Alysa Liu finished in second place with a revamped performance to a Lady Gaga medley, and Isabeau Levito finished in third place with an elegant performance set to music from Cinema Paradiso. "I had to skate after these two incredible ladies brought the house down, so I'm glad that I didn't disappoint too much," Glenn stated afterward. "I'm still just mind blown." Levito and Liu stayed after their performances to watch Glenn perform, each having delivered high-quality performances that resulted in season-high scores. After Glenn received her scores, she brought Levito and Liu into the kiss and cry to celebrate. Liu had earlier set a new record score in the short program, which Glenn subsequently broke less than fifteen minutes later. Remarking on the sharp contrast to rivalries which had become hallmarks of competitive figure skating in the past, Jordan Mendoza of the USA Today believed the bonds of friendship between Glenn, Liu, and Levito to be genuine. "I just think that we are all trying to lift each other up, and in doing so, it just pushes people to the top,” Glenn stated after the short program. “I think it's just all about that and doing it in a healthy way. And that's the future of our sport."

Glenn, Levito, and Liu were named to the 2026 Winter Olympic team on January 11. Liu had previously competed at the 2022 Winter Olympics in Beijing, after which she retired from competitive skating. She returned two years later, winning the 2025 World Figure Skating Championships. Glenn had also stepped away from competitive skating in 2015, citing mental health reasons. Since she returned, she learned to perform a triple Axel and won three consecutive U.S. Championship titles. Levito was the 2023 U.S. national champion and silver medalist at the 2024 World Figure Skating Championships. "This was my goal and my dream," Levito said of being chosen to compete at the Olympics, "and it just feels so special it came true."

Women's results
Rank	Skater	Total	SP		FS	
1st place, gold medalist(s)	Amber Glenn	233.55	1	83.05	1	150.50
2nd place, silver medalist(s)	Alysa Liu	228.91	2	81.11	3	147.80
3rd place, bronze medalist(s)	Isabeau Levito	224.45	3	75.72	2	148.73
4	Bradie Tennell	211.48	5	69.53	4	141.95
5	Sarah Everhardt	209.47	4	71.10	5	138.37
6	Sophie Joline von Felten	190.80	10	60.68	6	130.12
7	Starr Andrews	183.50	6	65.77	9	117.73
8	Sherry Zhang	180.24	9	60.99	8	119.25
9	Emilia Nemirovsky	176.72	14	53.28	7	123.44
10	Elyce Lin-Gracey	174.76	7	65.24	11	109.52
11	Logan Higase-Chen	171.09	12	55.22	10	115.87
12	Alina Bonillo	159.99	11	58.94	14	101.05
13	Katie Shen	158.15	17	49.50	12	108.65
14	Sonja Hilmer	155.25	13	55.00	15	100.25
15	Brooke Gewalt	152.99	16	50.59	13	102.40
16	Josephine Lee	152.31	8	62.79	18	89.52
17	Anabel Wallace	144.51	15	52.74	17	91.77
18	Erica Machida	144.26	18	49.41	16	94.85

=== Pairs ===
Alisa Efimova and Misha Mitrofanov won the U.S. Championship title for the second year in a row, outscoring Ellie Kam and Daniel O'Shea by a margin of over ten points. They already had a significant lead after the short program, but despite an early error during their double Axel jump sequence, they finished in first place. Katie McBeath and Daniil Parkman rallied back from a fifth-place finish in the short program to finish the competition in third place.

On January 11, U.S. Figure Skating announced that Kam and O'Shea, as well as Emily Chan and Spencer Akira Howe, had been named to the 2026 Winter Olympic team. The Olympic Charter states that an athlete must be a citizen of the country which he or she is representing at the Olympic Games. Alisa Efimova, who was originally from Finland, had tried to expedite her citizenship application. However, according to Matt Farrell, CEO of U.S. Figure Skating, "The selection procedures that were approved require a U.S. passport by the time of nomination of the team to the USOPC. At this time, there is not a current U.S. passport for Alisa Efimova." McBeath and Parkman were also not eligible to compete at the Olympics, since Parkman was not a U.S. citizen.

Pairs results
Rank	Team	Total	SP		FS	
1st place, gold medalist(s)	Alisa Efimova; Misha Mitrofanov	207.71	1	75.31	1	132.40
2nd place, silver medalist(s)	Ellie Kam; Daniel O'Shea	197.12	3	67.13	2	129.99
3rd place, bronze medalist(s)	Katie McBeath; Daniil Parkman	187.45	5	66.81	4	120.64
4	Emily Chan; Spencer Akira Howe	186.52	8	59.29	3	127.23
5	Audrey Shin; Balazs Nagy	185.10	2	67.67	5	117.43
6	Valentina Plazas; Maximiliano Fernandez	180.80	4	67.03	6	113.77
7	Olivia Flores; Luke Wang	175.86	6	63.58	8	112.28
8	Chelsea Liu; Ryan Bedard	175.56	7	62.34	7	113.22
9	Naomi Williams; Lachlan Lewer	152.86	9	55.09	9	97.77
10	Linzy Fitzpatrick; Keyton Bearinger	151.93	10	54.56	10	97.37

=== Ice dance ===
Madison Chock and Evan Bates easily won both segments of the ice dance competition, winning their seventh national title and setting a new record for the most U.S. championship titles won in ice dance. Their free dance, a blend of flamenco and paso doble styles set to "Paint It Black", earned them a new personal-best score with near-perfect Program Component Scores. Emilea Zingas and Vadym Kolesnik finished in second place, while Christina Carreira and Anthony Ponomarenko finished in third.

On January 11, U.S. Figure Skating announced that Chock and Bates, Zingas and Kolesnik, and Carreira and Ponomarenko had been named to the 2026 Winter Olympic team. This was the fourth appearance at the Winter Olympics for Chock and Bates, who won gold medals as part of the team event in 2022. "I think our chemistry really comes through when we perform, because we have a shared passion," Chock stated in December 2025. "We love what we do, but we also really love each other, and we're able to take this passion and use it to foster our connection as a couple. And I think from that we've grown a lot through our sport, and that's been such a great teacher for us."

Ice dance results
Rank	Team	Total	RD		FD	
1st place, gold medalist(s)	Madison Chock; Evan Bates	228.87	1	91.70	1	137.17
2nd place, silver medalist(s)	Emilea Zingas; Vadym Kolesnik	213.65	2	85.98	2	127.67
3rd place, bronze medalist(s)	Christina Carreira; Anthony Ponomarenko	206.95	3	83.29	3	123.66
4	Caroline Green; Michael Parsons	202.05	4	80.55	4	121.50
5	Emily Bratti; Ian Somerville	197.29	5	79.43	6	117.86
6	Oona Brown; Gage Brown	194.31	6	75.72	5	118.59
7	Katarina Wolfkostin; Dimitry Tsarevski	186.60	7	74.99	7	111.61
8	Leah Neset; Artem Markelov	176.46	9	71.28	8	105.18
9	Maia Shibutani; Alex Shibutani	173.17	10	71.24	10	101.93
10	Amy Cui; Jonathan Rogers	172.39	12	67.90	9	104.79
11	Eva Pate; Logan Bye	170.49	8	73.54	14	96.95
12	Elliana Peal; Ethan Peal	169.60	11	69.60	12	100.00
13	Raffaella Koncius; Alexey Shchepetov	166.62	14	65.15	11	101.47
14	Isabella Flores; Linus Colmor Jepsen	160.75	13	66.37	15	94.38
15	Vanessa Pham; Anton Spiridonov	158.62	15	61.41	13	97.21

== Junior results ==
=== Men's singles ===
Patrick Blackwell, who had won the bronze medal at the 2025 U.S. Figure Skating Championships, won the junior men's title, defeating Caleb Farrington by a margin of more than twenty-five points. "Coming back from a disaster of a long program last year, it feels pretty good to get a good long program... done at nationals," Blackwell stated. Blackwell's free skate earned a new personal-best score and featured a quadruple toe loop, quadruple Salchow, and a triple Axel-triple Axel jump sequence. "I'm happy to walk away with the gold medal here, but this is not just for me," Blackwell explained, "but the ones who passed a year ago." Blackwell's friend Spencer Lane had died aboard American Airlines Flight 5342 when it crashed into the Potomac River one year prior. Blackwell used a forty-second section of music from Lane's planned 2026 program in his own free skate. Despite a fall on his opening quadruple toe loop, Caleb Farrington finished in second place, landing six clean triple jumps. Louis Mallane, who had been in seventh place after the short program, rallied back to win the bronze medal.

Junior men's results
Rank	Skater	Total	SP		FS	
1st place, gold medalist(s)	Patrick Blackwell	236.30	1	74.80	1	161.50
2nd place, silver medalist(s)	Caleb Farrington	211.04	3	73.71	2	137.33
3rd place, bronze medalist(s)	Louis Mallane	187.67	7	63.15	3	124.52
4	Nicholas Brooks	186.95	2	74.24	7	112.71
5	Zachary LoPinto	181.43	4	66.85	5	114.58
6	Alek Tankovic	177.69	6	64.12	6	113.57
7	Kirk Haugeto	176.85	11	55.74	4	121.11
8	Joshua Snyder	169.44	8	62.97	9	106.47
9	Henry Gao	165.78	9	60.74	10	105.04
10	Ryan William Azadpour	157.96	5	65.17	14	92.79
11	Thomas Chen	155.74	10	58.72	12	97.02
12	Michael Jin	154.13	18	44.50	8	109.63
13	Ryedin Rudedenman	146.98	13	51.46	13	95.52
14	Jesse Zhong	145.83	17	44.97	11	100.86
15	Zenith Chen	143.62	12	51.83	15	91.79
16	Michael Khavin	137.92	15	50.28	16	87.64
17	Hitonari Tani	134.65	14	51.06	17	83.59
18	Mike Weng	115.00	16	47.61	18	67.39

=== Women's singles ===
Angela Shao, who had been in second place after the short program, successfully performed seven triple jumps and earned a new personal-best score in the free skate to win the gold medal. Annika Chao, who had been in second place after the short program, won the silver medal. Despite an error on her second Lutz jump, Chao successfully performed five triple jumps and a series of what Troy Schwindt and Elvin Walker of U.S. Figure Skating described as "picture-perfect spins". Hannah Kim, who had been in the lead after the short program, finished in third place. "I was actually proud of it," Kim said of her program. "I feel like I have been through so much this year... I think after I finished all of my jumps, I was in disbelief because it's all over now. I feel like this season has been really tough on me, and I needed that skate tonight."

Junior women's results
Rank	Skater	Total	SP		FS	
1st place, gold medalist(s)	Angela Shao	187.44	2	61.88	1	125.56
2nd place, silver medalist(s)	Annika Chao	177.43	3	58.78	2	118.65
3rd place, bronze medalist(s)	Hannah Kim	173.99	1	62.19	5	111.80
4	Jessica Jurka	172.36	5	56.17	3	116.29
5	Madison Chong	168.77	6	54.69	4	114.08
6	Sofia Bezkorovainaya	168.28	4	57.24	6	111.04
7	Rachel Samiri	161.58	11	50.67	7	110.91
8	Kaya Tiernan	161.26	10	50.86	8	110.40
9	Deborah Liu	158.69	7	54.19	10	104.50
10	Alayna Coats	155.21	12	46.25	9	108.96
11	Cleo Park	154.19	9	51.43	11	102.76
12	Mia Smith	148.31	8	52.88	14	95.43
13	Annabelle Wilkins	141.53	13	45.30	13	96.23
14	Mia Iwase	138.41	14	43.65	15	94.75
15	Jiaying Ellyse Johnson	136.28	18	38.29	12	97.99
16	Candice Leung	136.28	17	40.63	16	85.30
17	Stella Vajda	117.99	15	42.56	17	75.43
18	Penelope Ogorelkoff	109.62	16	40.71	18	68.91

=== Pairs ===
Reagan Moss and Jakub Galbavy won the junior pairs title for the second consecutive year, becoming the first junior pairs team to do so in the history of the U.S. Figure Skating Championships. Moss and Galbavy set new personal-best scores in both the free skate and overall total, winning the competition by more than sixteen points. Sofia Jarmoc and Luke Witkowski, who had finished in fourth place at the 2025 U.S. Championships, won the silver medal, also setting new personal-best scores in the free skate and overall total. "We were very sick going into the competition," Witkowski stated afterward. "We are grateful for those programs where you really have to fight for it... All things considered, we did a good job. We had a personal best, so no complaints here." Milada Kovar and Jared McPike finished in third place.

Junior pairs results
Rank	Team	Total	SP		FS	
1st place, gold medalist(s)	Reagan Moss; Jakub Galbavy	173.00	1	61.93	1	111.07
2nd place, silver medalist(s)	Sofia Jarmoc; Luke Witkowski	156.61	2	57.78	2	98.83
3rd place, bronze medalist(s)	Milada Kovar; Jared McPike	142.98	3	53.06	4	89.92
4	Alena Kerr; Sam Herbert	140.53	6	48.67	3	91.86
5	Addyson McDanold; Aaron Felderbaum	136.95	4	51.71	6	85.24
6	Baylen Taich; Nickolai Apter	135.11	5	49.33	5	85.78
7	Kaitlyn Oh; Michael Chapa	127.84	7	45.47	8	82.37
8	Gabrielle Kaplan; Carter Griffin	125.15	8	43.85	8	81.30
9	Juliet Meek; Devin Meek	115.01	9	40.50	9	74.51

=== Ice dance ===
Hana Maria Aboian and Daniil Veselukhin won the junior ice dance competition for the second year in a row, setting new personal-best scores in the free dance and overall total. Aboian and Veselukhin had won every competition in which they competed this season, including the 2025 Junior Grand Prix of Figure Skating Final. "Winning the title last year was like years and years of effort finally paid off," Aboian stated afterward. "Coming back and doing it again is a surreal feeling." Jasmine Robertson and Chase Rohner, in only their first year skating together, finished in second place. Jane Calhoun and Mark Zheltyshev, also in their first year as a team, finished in third place.

Junior ice dance results
Rank	Team	Total	RD		FD	
1st place, gold medalist(s)	Hana Maria Aboian; Daniil Veselukhin	174.47	1	71.68	1	102.79
2nd place, silver medalist(s)	Jasmine Robertson; Chase Rohner	158.16	2	63.56	2	94.60
3rd place, bronze medalist(s)	Jane Calhoun; Mark Zheltyshev	146.75	4	58.61	3	88.14
4	Aneta Vaclavikova; William Lissauer	139.91	5	56.17	4	83.74
5	Anaelle Kouevi; Yann Homawoo	139.63	3	58.81	6	80.82
6	Michelle Deych; Ryan Hu	136.62	8	53.89	5	82.73
7	Grace Fischer; Luke Fisher	135.82	6	55.75	8	80.07
8	Sophia Feige; Wiles Middlekauff	134.69	7	53.98	7	80.71
9	Annelise Stapert; Maxim Korotcov	129.83	9	53.37	10	76.46
10	Marian Carhardt; Denis Bledsoe	123.92	10	47.40	9	76.52
11	Clara Fugate; Warren Fugate	123.24	11	47.12	11	76.12
12	Annie Huang; Simon Mintz	105.22	12	41.91	12	63.31

== International team selections ==
=== Winter Olympics ===
The figure skating events at the 2026 Winter Olympics were held between February 6 and 19 at the Milano Ice Skating Arena in Milan, Italy. Ilia Malinin, Alysa Liu, Amber Glenn, Ellie Kam, Daniel O'Shea, Madison Chock, and Evan Bates all won gold medals competing in the team event. Liu won the gold medal in the women's event, while Chock and Bates won the silver in the ice dance event.

U.S. delegation to the 2026 Winter Olympics
No.	Men	Women	Pairs	Ice dance
1	Ilia Malinin	Amber Glenn	Emily Chan; Spencer Akira Howe	Christina Carreira; Anthony Ponomarenko
2	Maxim Naumov	Isabeau Levito	Ellie Kam; Daniel O'Shea	Madison Chock; Evan Bates
3	Andrew Torgashev	Alysa Liu	—N/a	Emilea Zingas; Vadym Kolesnik

U.S. alternates to the 2026 Winter Olympics
No.	Men	Women	Pairs	Ice dance
1	Jason Brown	Bradie Tennell	Audrey Shin; Balázs Nagy	Caroline Green; Michael Parsons
2	Tomoki Hiwatashi	Sarah Everhardt	Valentina Plazas; Maximiliano Fernandez	Emily Bratti; Ian Somerville
3	Jacob Sanchez	Starr Andrews	Chelsea Liu; Ryan Bedard	Oona Brown; Gage Brown

=== World Championships ===
The 2026 World Championships were held from March 24 to 29 in Prague, Czech Republic. Alysa Liu withdrew on March 7; she was replaced by Sarah Everhardt after Bradie Tennell declined the invitation to compete. Madison Chock and Evan Bates also withdrew; they were replaced by Caroline Green and Michael Parsons. Ellie Kam and Daniel O'Shea withdrew on March 16; they were replaced by Emily Chan and Spencer Akira Howe. Ilia Malinin won the gold medal in the men's event, while Emilea Zingas and Vadym Kolesnik won the bronze in the ice dance event.

U.S. delegation to the 2026 World Championships
No.	Men	Women	Pairs	Ice dance
1	~~Jason Brown~~ (withdrew)	Amber Glenn	Alisa Efimova; Misha Mitrofanov	Christina Carreira; Anthony Ponomarenko
2	Ilia Malinin	Isabeau Levito	Ellie Kam; Daniel O'Shea; (withdrew)	Madison Chock; Evan Bates; (withdrew)
3	Andrew Torgashev	~~Alysa Liu~~ (withdrew)	Katie McBeath; Daniil Parkman	Emilea Zingas; Vadym Kolesnik

U.S. alternates to the 2026 World Championships
No.	Men	Women	Pairs	Ice dance
1	Maxim Naumov	~~Bradie Tennell~~ (declined)	Audrey Shin; Balázs Nagy; (declined)	Caroline Green; Michael Parsons; (called up)
2	~~Tomoki Hiwatashi~~ (retired)	Sarah Everhardt (called up)	Emily Chan; Spencer Akira Howe; (called up)	Emily Bratti; Ian Somerville
3	Jacob Sanchez (called up)	Starr Andrews	Valentina Plazas; Maximiliano Fernandez	Oona Brown; Gage Brown

=== Four Continents Championships ===
The 2026 Four Continents Championships were held from January 21 to 25 in Beijing, China. Jason Brown withdrew from the competition; Liam Kapeikis was named as his replacement. The three ice dance teams swept the podium: Emilea Zingas and Vadym Kolesnik finished in first place, Caroline Green and Michael Parsons finished in second, and Oona and Gage Brown finished in third. Alisa Efimova and Misha Mitrofanov were the gold medalists in the pairs event.

U.S. delegation to the 2026 Four Continents Championships
No.	Men	Women	Pairs	Ice dance
1	~~Jason Brown~~ (withdrew)	Starr Andrews	Alisa Efimova; Misha Mitrofanov	Oona Brown; Gage Brown
2	Tomoki Hiwatashi	Sarah Everhardt	Katie McBeath; Daniil Parkman	Caroline Green; Michael Parsons
3	Jacob Sanchez	Bradie Tennell	Audrey Shin; Balazs Nagy	Emilea Zingas; Vadym Kolesnik

U.S. alternates to the 2026 Four Continents Championships
No.	Men	Women	Pairs	Ice dance
1	Liam Kapeikis (called up)	Elyce Lin-Gracey	Valentina Plazas; Maximiliano Fernandez	Emily Bratti; Ian Somerville
2	Jimmy Ma	Josephine Lee	Chelsea Liu; Ryan Bedard	Katarina Wolfkostin; Dimitry Tsarevski
3	Daniel Martynov	Katie Shen	Olivia Flores; Luke Wang	Eva Pate; Logan Bye

=== World Junior Championships ===
The 2026 World Junior Championships were held from March 3 to 8 in Tallinn, Estonia. Jane Calhoun and Mark Zheltyshev withdrew from the competition on February 19 when Zheltyshev was refused entry to Estonia with his Russian passport; they were replaced by Michelle Deych and Ryan Hu. Hana Maria Aboian and Daniil Veselukhin were the gold medalists in the ice dance event.

U.S. delegation to the 2026 World Junior Championships
No.	Men	Women	Pairs	Ice dance
1	Lucius Kazanecki	Angela Shao	Olivia Flores; Luke Wang	Hana Maria Aboian; Daniil Veselukhin
2	Jacob Sanchez	Sophie Joline von Felten	Reagan Moss; Jakub Galbavy	Jane Calhoun; Mark Zheltyshev; (withdrew)
3	—N/a			Jasmine Robertson; Chase Rohner

U.S. alternates to the 2026 World Junior Championships
No.	Men	Women	Pairs	Ice dance
1	Patrick Blackwell	Annika Chao	Sofia Jarmoc; Luke Witkowski	Michelle Deych; Ryan Hu; (called up)
2	Caleb Farrington	Sherry Zhang	Naomi Williams; Lachlan Lewer	Annelise Stapert; Maxim Korotcov
3	Lorenzo Elano	Emilia Nemirovsky	Milada Kovar; Jared McPike	Grace Fischer; Luke Fisher

== Works cited ==
- "Special Regulations & Technical Rules – Single & Pair Skating and Ice Dance 2024" (PDF). International Skating Union. Archived (PDF) from the original on November 9, 2024.
- "The 2025–26 Official U.S. Figure Skating Rulebook" (PDF). U.S. Figure Skating. 2025. Archived (PDF) from the original on September 10, 2025.
