= Emilea Zingas =

Cypriot-American figure skater (born 2002)

Emilea Zingas OLY
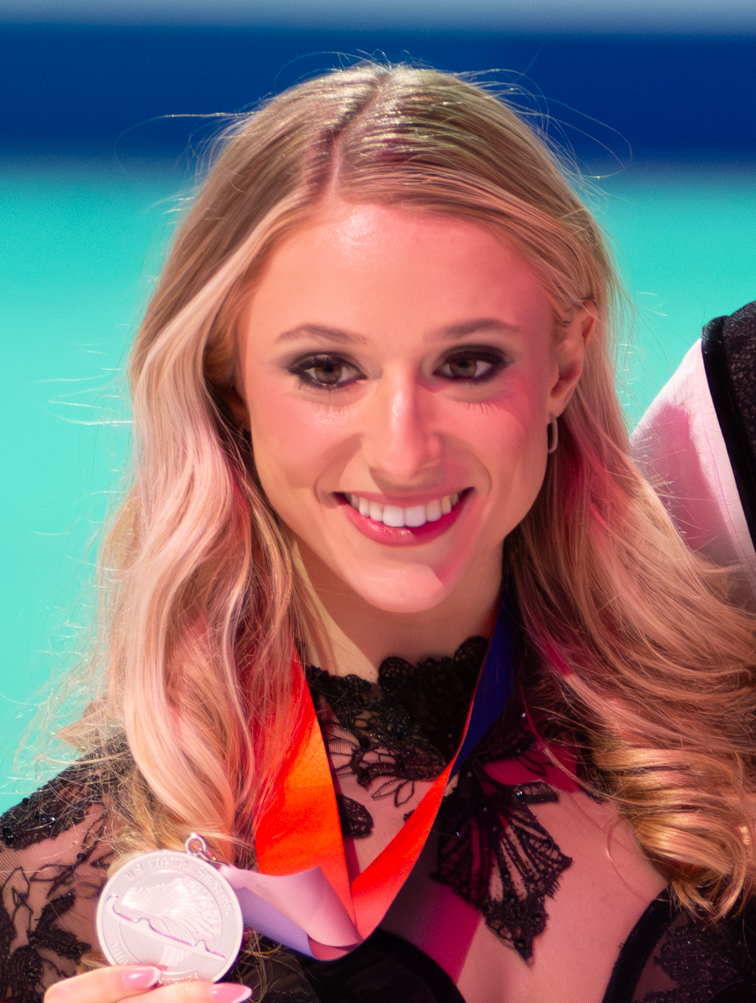
- Zingas during the medal ceremony at the 2026 U.S. Championships

Personal information
- Born: April 22, 2002 (age 24) Grosse Pointe Farms, Michigan, U.S.
- Height: 5 ft 1 in (1.55 m)

Figure skating career
- Country: United States (since 2022); Cyprus (2020–22)
- Discipline: Ice dance (since 2022); Women's singles (2020–22)
- Partner: Vadym Kolesnik
- Coach: Igor Shpilband; Natalia Deller; Adrienne Lenda; Pasquale Camerlengo
- Skating club: St. Clair Shores Figure Skating Club
- Began skating: 2009

Medal record
Representing United States
World Championships
Bronze medal – third place	2026 Prague	Ice dance
Four Continents Championships
Gold medal – first place	2026 Beijing	Ice dance
U.S. Championships
Silver medal – second place	2026 St. Louis	Ice dance

Emilea Zingas (Greek: Εμίλια Ζίνγκας; born April 22, 2002) is a Cypriot-American figure skater. Competing in ice dance for the United States with Vadym Kolesnik, she is a 2026 World Championship bronze medalist, a 2026 Four Continents champion, two-time Grand Prix medalist, a five-time Challenger Series medalist, the 2026 U.S. National silver medalist, and the 2023, 2025 U.S. national pewter medalist.

Zingas and Kolesnik represented the United States at the 2026 Winter Olympics.

Zingas previously represented Cyprus in women's singles, and was the 2020 Santa Claus Cup silver medalist and the 2021 Challenge Cup bronze medalist. She was the first Cypriot skater to qualify for the World Championships.

== Personal life ==
Zingas was born on April 22, 2002, in Grosse Pointe Farms, Michigan to parents Chris, an orthopedic surgeon, and Marsha, a dermatopathologist. She is the youngest of four children, including a sister, Elana, who played ice hockey at Cornell University. Zingas' paternal grandparents, Nick and Xenia Zingas, were born in Cyprus. She holds both U.S. and Cypriot citizenship. She is fluent in English, Greek and Russian.

Zingas graduated from Grosse Pointe South High School in 2020, and currently studies neuroscience at Wayne State University.

Since 2022, she has been in a relationship with her ice dance partner, Vadym Kolesnik.

== Career ==
=== Early career ===
Zingas began skating as a preschooler and started training at age seven with Paula Visingardi and ballet professional Maria Moscato. Later she also took lessons from Lindsay O'Donoghue and Brooke Castile O'Keefe in St. Clair Shores, Michigan. Zingas won the 2018 U.S. national novice silver medal in her only trip to the U.S. Championships as a singles skater.

=== Singles skating (for Cyprus) ===
==== 2020–2021 season: Senior international debut ====
During the 2020–21 season, Zingas took advantage of her gap semester and switched nationalities to compete for Cyprus. She made her international competitive debut at the 2020 CS Budapest Trophy, where she finished seventh. Zingas later competed at 2020 Ice Star and 2020 Santa Claus Cup, where she finished fifth and second, respectively. She noted that she was grateful to have the opportunity to travel internationally during the COVID-19 pandemic, especially as she was returning to her Michigan training base between events in Europe.

At the 2021 Challenge Cup in February, Zingas won the bronze behind Belgian Loena Hendrickx and Emmy Ma of Chinese Taipei, as well as earned her technical minimums to qualify for the 2021 World Championships. She is the first Cypriot skater to ever qualify for the World Championships. During the short program at the World Championships in March, Zingas popped a planned triple Lutz into a single, and fell on the triple flip in her planned triple flip-triple toe loop combination, both of which severely impacted her score. She finished thirty-sixth in the segment and did not advance to the free skate.

==== 2021–2022 season ====
After a tenth-place finish at the Skating Club of Boston's Cranberry Cup International event, Zingas was assigned to compete at the 2021 CS Nebelhorn Trophy to attempt to qualify a berth for Cyprus at the 2022 Winter Olympics. She placed ninth at the event, resulting in Cyprus being the second reserve for the Olympics. She appeared at two additional Challenger events in the fall, coming sixteenth at the 2021 CS Cup of Austria and fourteenth at the 2021 CS Warsaw Cup.

During her competitive season, Zingas was offered the opportunity to try out in ice dancing, a discipline she had no previous experience in, with reigning World Junior champion Vadym Kolesnik, whose partnership with Avonley Nguyen had ended after that gold medal win. Kolesnik would later say that "the first time I skated with Emilea I felt something special. I felt like I can be myself. She opens up in the way that I want to skate and that's how it comes out — freedom." On May 15, Zingas officially announced that the two would compete together representing the United States.

=== Ice dance with Vadym Kolesnik (for the United States) ===
==== 2022–2023 season: Debut of Zingas/Kolesnik ====
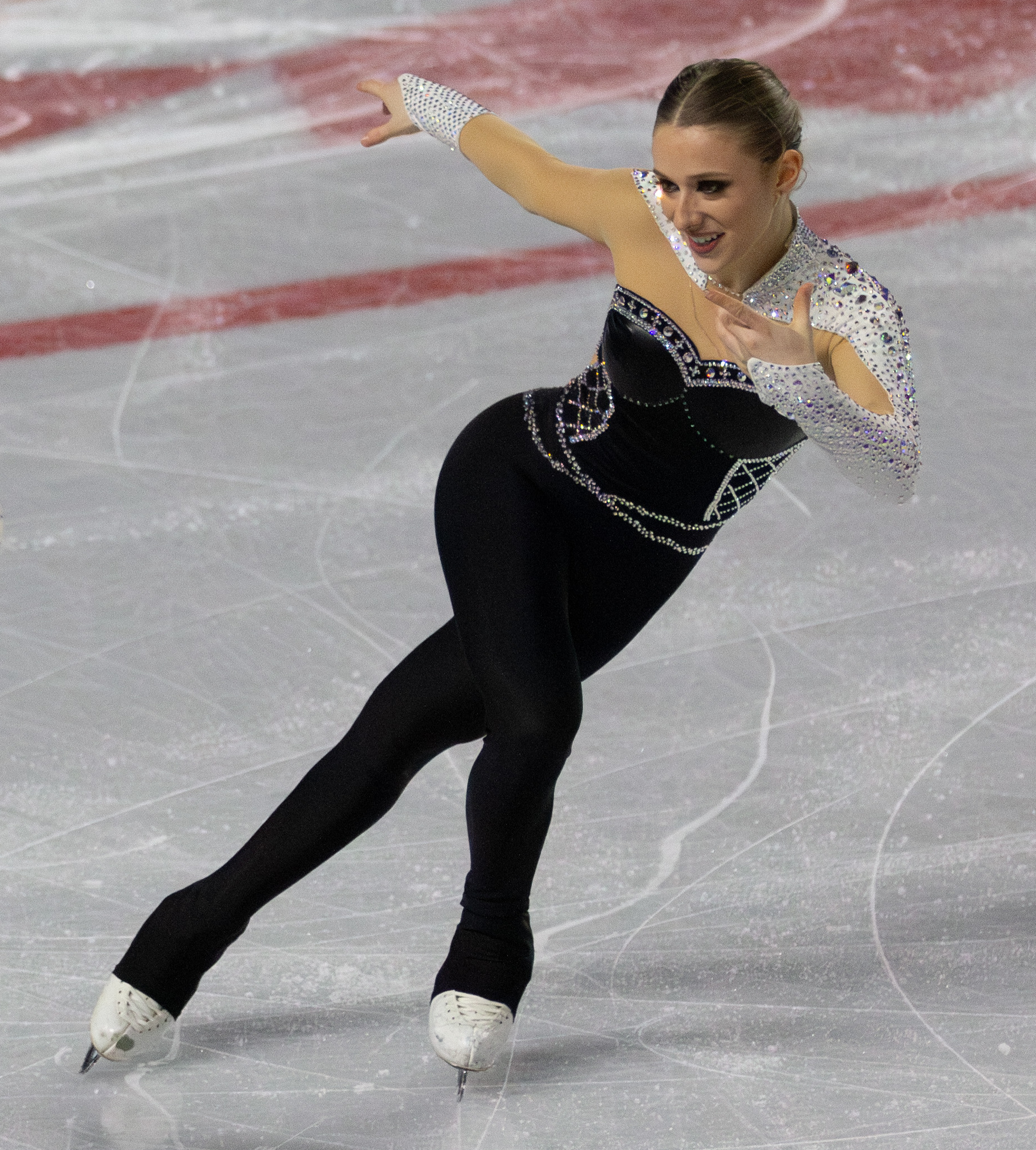
Zingas during the rhythm dance at 2023 Skate Canada International

Zingas/Kolesnik made their international debut in December 2022 at 2022 CS Golden Spin of Zagreb, where they won the bronze medal.

After winning gold in November 2022 at the U.S. Ice Dance Final to qualify for the 2023 U.S. Championships, the team entered a dance field more open than normal due to presumptive national silver medalists Hawayek/Baker being absent due to health issues. Zingas/Kolesnik unexpectedly placed third in the rhythm dance, less than a point ahead of Zagreb gold medalists Carreira/Ponomarenko, who had erred on their twizzles. After the free dance, Carreira/Ponomarenko had squeaked ahead overall by 0.32, but Zingas/Kolesnik stood on the podium as pewter medalists, a noteworthy achievement in a team's first season. Kolesnik said of the new partnership "I think we've got a match."

==== 2023–2024 season: Grand Prix and Four Continents debut ====
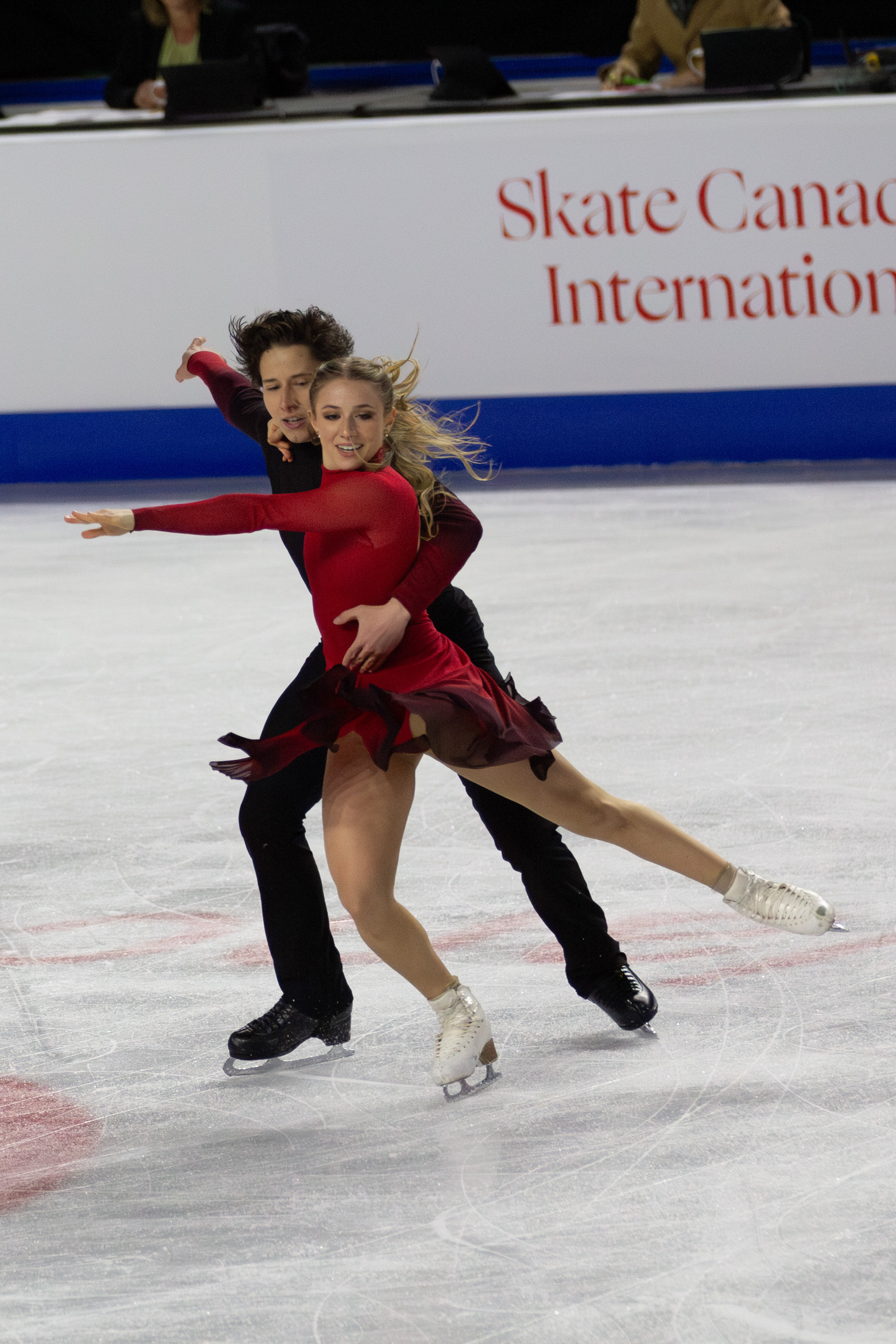
Zingas/Kolesnik during their free dance at 2023 Skate Canada International

For their free dance, Zingas proposed skating to Alan Menken's Beauty and the Beast film score, which Kolesnik was persuaded of after a "watch party."

Beginning the season on the Challenger circuit, Zingas/Kolesnik finished fourth at the 2023 CS Nepela Memorial. They were invited to make their Grand Prix debut at 2023 Skate Canada International, where they placed fifth, despite a rhythm dance twizzle error. They were fifth as well at the 2023 Grand Prix of Espoo. Zingas/Kolesnik finished out the fall season at the 2023 CS Golden Spin of Zagreb, where they won the silver medal.

In advance of the 2024 U.S. Championships, Zingas/Kolesnik were named as first alternates for the American team for the 2024 Four Continents Championships in Shanghai.

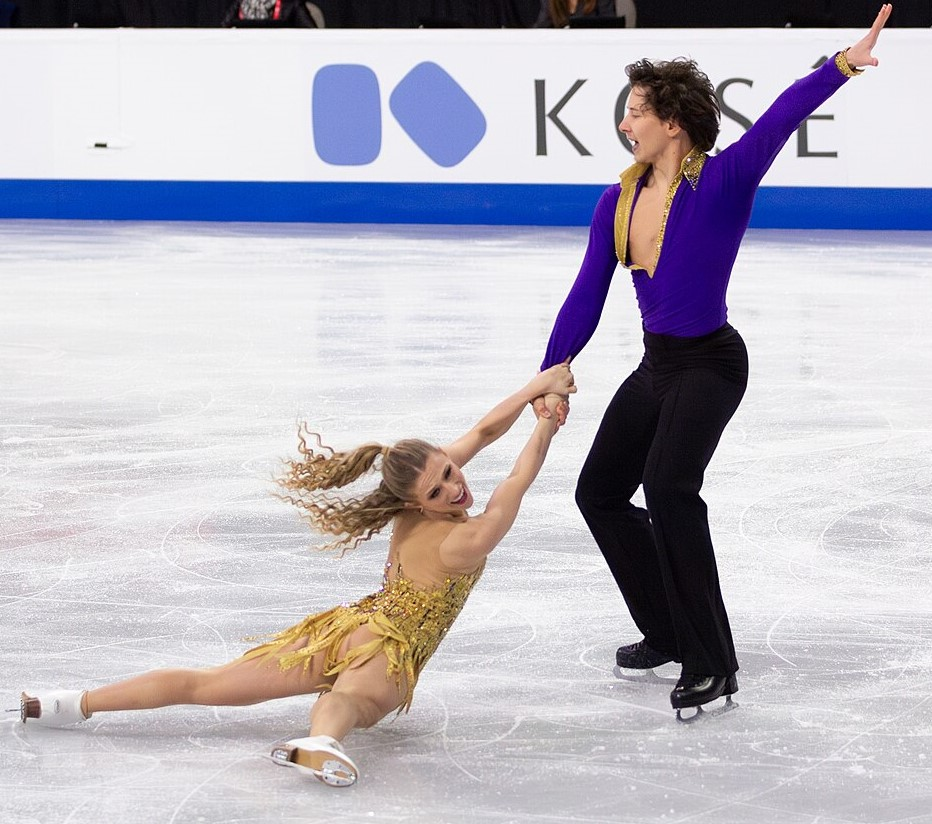
Zingas/Kolesnik performing their rhythm dance at 2024 Skate Canada International

They finished only sixth at the national championships, but were notified while driving home that national champions Chock/Bates had withdrawn from the Four Continents Championships due to illness, and they were to fly to Shanghai the following morning. They were fourth in both segments of the competition, coming fourth overall, 1.07 points back of bronze medalists Carreira/Ponomarenko. Zingas called the event "a great bonus."

==== 2024–2025 season ====
Zingas/Kolesnik started the season by winning bronze at the 2024 CS Nebelhorn Trophy. Beginning the 2024–25 Grand Prix series at 2024 Skate Canada International, they came fourth in the rhythm dance, 1.13 points behind third-place French team Lopareva/Brissaud. Both partners received low levels on their twizzles in the free dance, and they dropped to fifth overall, which Kolesnik called "very disappointing." They followed this up by finishing fifth at the 2024 Finlandia Trophy. "We are happy though that we could finish this competition on a high note with a good free dance," said Zingas.

In January, Zingas/Kolesnik competed at the 2025 U.S. Championships, where they placed third in the rhythm dance and fourth in the free dance, finishing fourth overall. After the competition, Zingas described the season as challenging and noted the growth and maturity the team had shown.

They then closed the season with a fifth-place finish at the 2025 Four Continents Championships in Seoul, South Korea. “I'm happy with what we’ve done today,” said Kolesnik after the free dance. “I think we just wanted to skate our best and give justice to this program because we love it. We enjoy doing it and I feel like no matter how we skated, we just wanted to enjoy this process and today I felt like we accomplished it.”

==== 2025–2026 season: Milano Cortina Olympics, World bronze, Four Continents gold, two Grand Prix medals and U.S. national silver medal ====
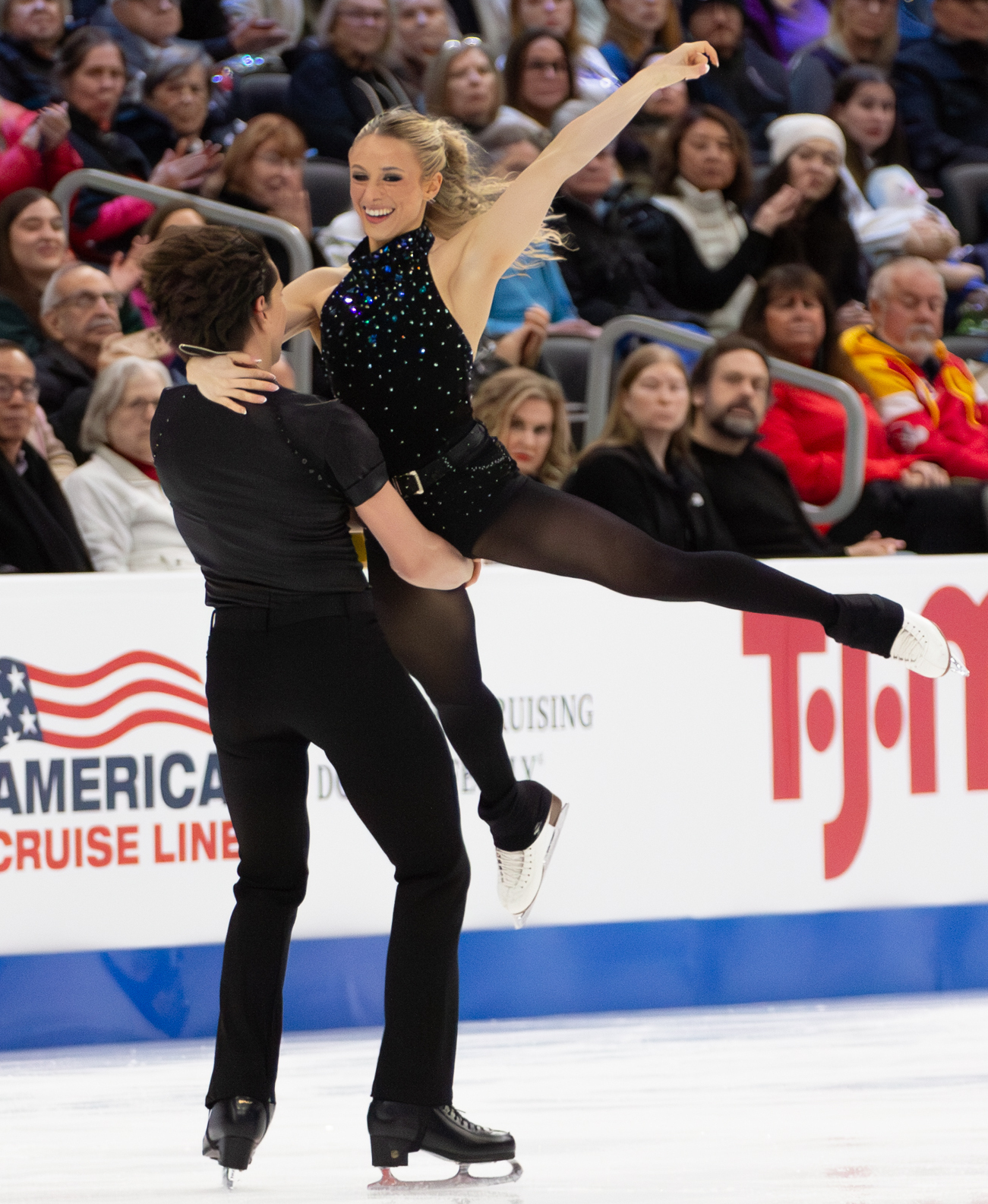
Zingas and Kolesnik performing a lift during their rhythm dance at the 2026 U.S. Championships

Zingas/Kolesnik opened their season by winning silver at the 2025 CS Kinoshita Group Cup. They subsequently went on to compete on the 2025–26 Grand Prix circuit, winning their first Grand Prix medal, a silver, at the 2025 Cup of China. Both ice dancers were happy to have broken the 80-point mark in the Rhythm Dance. Speaking on the result following the event, Kolesnik shared, "I feel like I won the Olympics right now, but I'm just second at a Grand Prix. But that's how I feel. I feel so much happiness and joy inside of me right now. I can't even describe it with words. I'm just so happy that we went out there with all this pressure that we never had before."

The following month Zingas/Kolesnik won the bronze at 2025 Finlandia Trophy, qualifying for the 2025–26 Grand Prix Final. "I’m in shock! I think we’re still shaking a little," said Zingas after the free dance. "Just because before the skate, I wanted it so badly. I wasn’t thinking too much about the Final until we got here, and everybody started asking us questions about it and stuff. And I love Japan; I so much wanted to go to Japan."

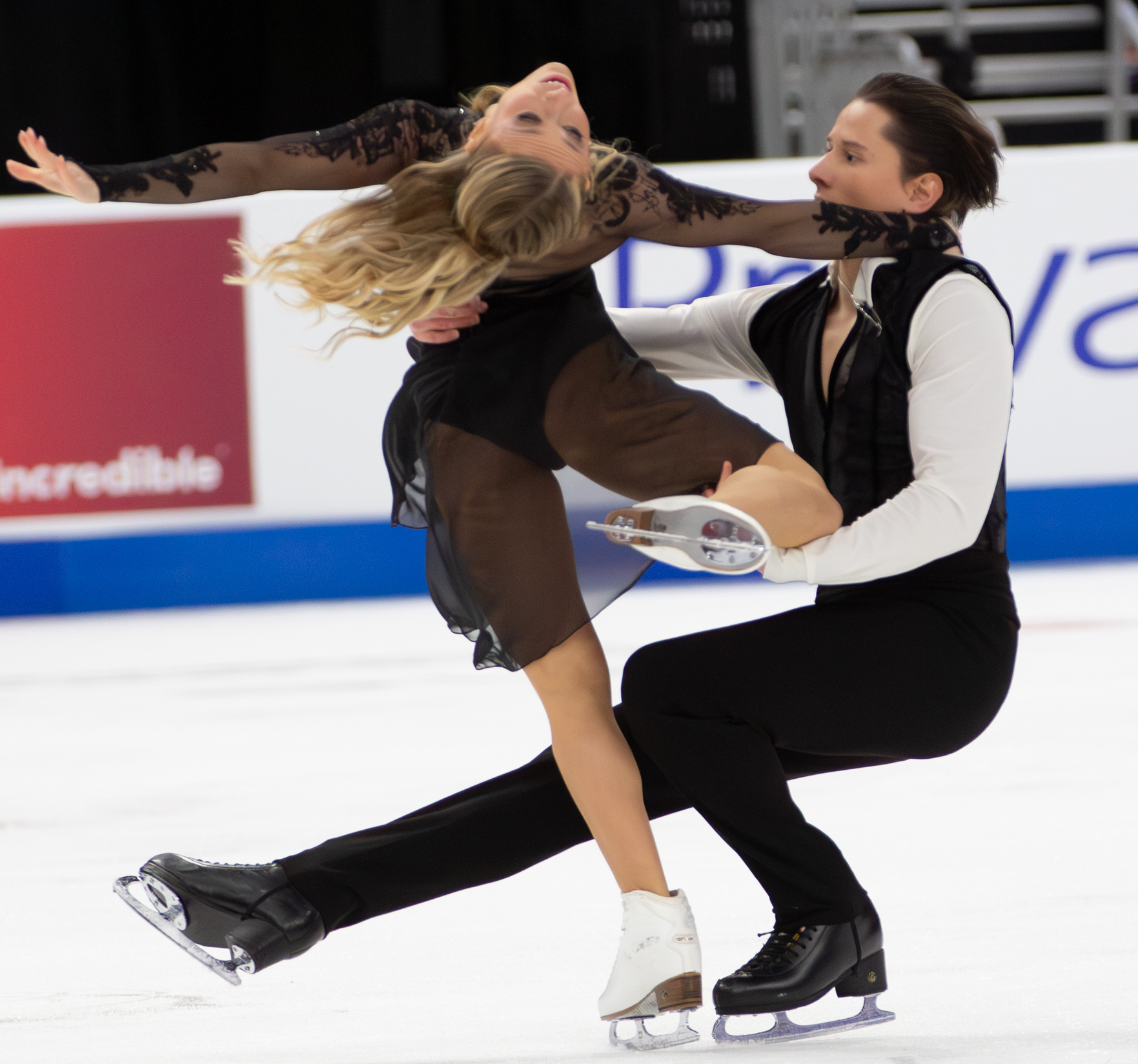
Zingas and Kolesnik performing a spin during their free dance at the 2026 U.S. Championships

In December, Zingas/Kolesnik competed at the 2025–26 Grand Prix Final where they placed sixth. “I think the crowd was amazing today,” said Zingas after the free dance. “We feel really grateful we have this opportunity. Today we did make a mistake and it's kind of an uncharacteristic mistake for us. So, we will drill it when we get home and work to make everything the best we can and improve before the national championships."

The following month, Zingas/Kolesnik won the silver medal at the 2026 U.S. Championships behind Chock/Bates. "This is an extremely special event for us," said Zingas. "Last year at this time, we experienced some disappointment at the U.S. Championships, and honestly, I feel grateful for that moment because it taught me to know what I want and taught me how I don't want to feel after a national championship." They were subsequently named to the 2026 Winter Olympic team. Less than two weeks later, Zinga/Kolesnik won gold at the 2026 Four Continents Figure Skating Championships in their third appearance at this event. "It's been a great season; we had so much fun," Zingas summed up. "Every competition this season, I think we just tried to forget about the expectation and just skate our absolute best."

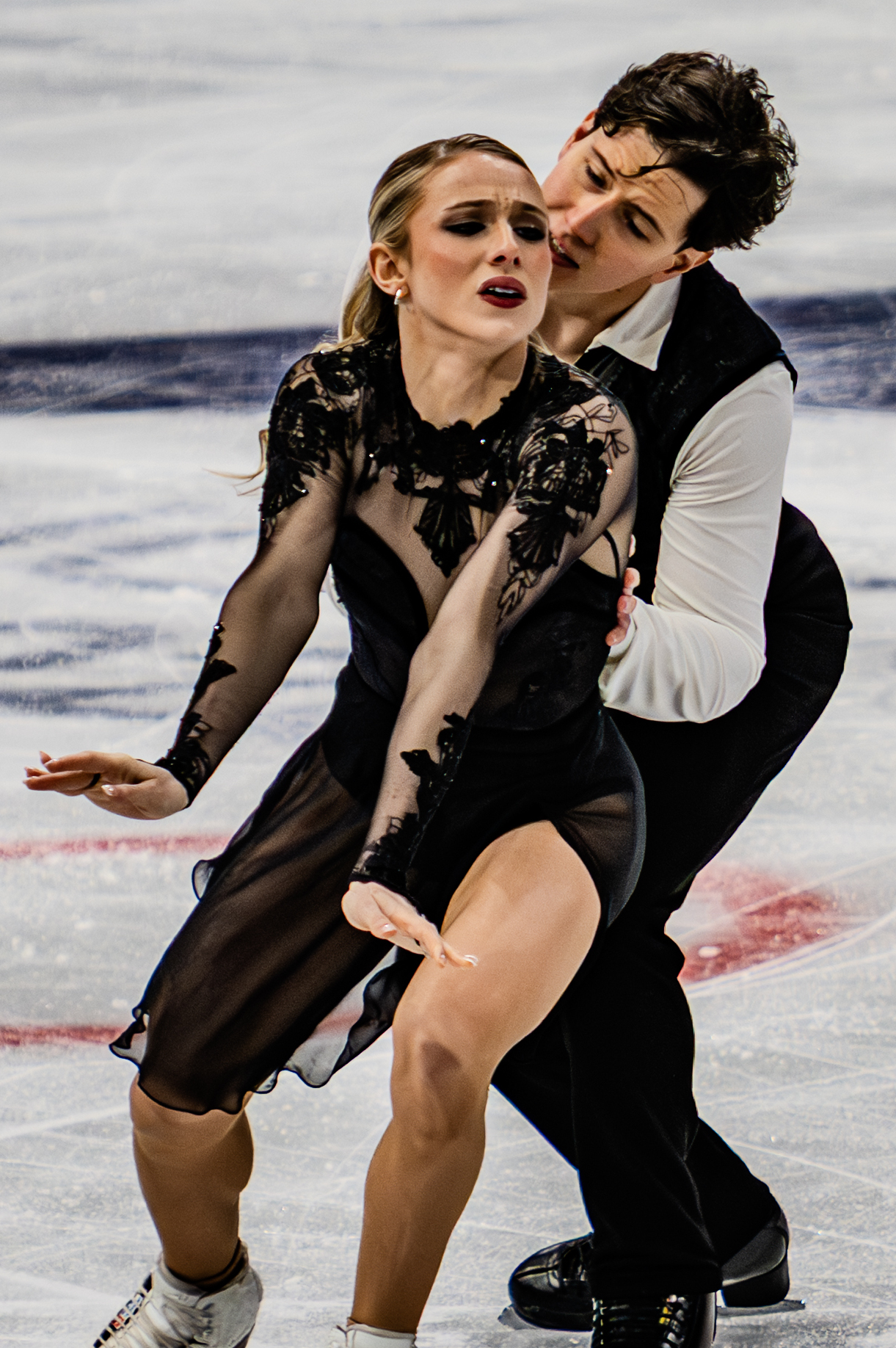
Zingas and Kolesnik during a practice session at the 2026 Winter Olympics

Before leaving for the Winter Olympics, Kolesnik and Zingas set up a GoFundMe page to raise enough money to fly Kolesnik's family members from Ukraine to Milan, so that they could watch him and Zingas compete. The duo ultimately raised over twenty-five thousand dollars, surpassing their page's goal. As a result, Kolesnik was able to fly his aunt, Snezhana, and sister-in-law, Irina, two family members that he had not been able to see in four years due to the Russo-Ukrainian war. However, Kolesnik's mother was forced to stay behind in the U.S due to concerns of immigration policies under Trump's second administration.

On 9 February, Zingas/Kolesnik competed in the rhythm dance segment at the 2026 Winter Olympics, placing sixth in that segment and scoring a personal best. "I've never been so peaceful with myself than I am at this competition," said Kolesnik following their performance. "I don't know how to even explain this. I mean, I know it's Olympic stage, and for many people, this is the moment of their lives. I just thought of it as a test challenge for our next eight years, because this is just the beginning for us, and we're going to reach higher places. So I wanted to have good experience, and I couldn't ask for more."

Two days later, Zingas/Kolesnik placed fifth in the free dance segment, earning another personal best and finishing fifth overall. "I mean, this is crazy! We’re top five at the Olympics!" said Zingas. "This is absolutely insane! If you told me one year ago today that I'd be top five at the Olympics, I would have said, ‘No, it's a lie. It's a straight-up lie.’"

The following month, Zingas/Kolesnik competed at the 2026 World Figure Skating Championships where they won the bronze in their debut at this event after earning all-new personal best scores. “My brain is still processing what’s happening,” said Zingas. “All I can say is that I’m just so full of joy, and it’s a miracle night for us. I’m so excited, and I’m so grateful to be sitting up here with these guys. It feels so real, surreal.”

==== 2026–2027 season: First Grand Prix gold ====
Zingas and Kolesnik opened their season at 2026 Skate America where they claimed their first Grand Prix gold medal. “It feels really amazing to be given the gold medal,” said Zingas. “For the start of the season and for these programs being much more challenging than our last year programs, I’m really excited and I’m really happy. I feel the growth will come as the season progresses.”

== Programs ==
=== Ice dance with Vadym Kolesnik (for the United States) ===
Season	Rhythm dance	Free dance	Exhibition
2022–2023	Conga by Gloria Estefan and the Miami Sound Machine; Tan Sola by Sole Giménez; Conga performed by Meek Mill choreo. by Igor Shpilband	Metamorphosis II; Violin Concerto No. 1; Truman Sleeps by Philip Glass choreo. by Igor Shpilband	
2023–2024	Another Part of Me; Liberian Girl; Smooth Criminal by Michael Jackson choreo. by Igor Shpilband	Beauty and the Beast; Main Title Prologue; Transformations; Overture by Alan Menken; Evermore by Alan Menken & Tim Rice performed by Josh Groban choreo. by Igor Shpilband	Conga by Gloria Estefan and the Miami Sound Machine; Tan Sola by Sole Giménez; Conga performed by Meek Mill choreo. by Igor Shpilband
2024–2025	Jive Talkin'; Stayin' Alive; You Should Be Dancing by Bee Gees choreo. by Igor Shpilband	Epilogue by Ólafur Arnalds; Lost It to Trying by Son Lux choreo. by Benoît Richaud	Jive Talkin'; Stayin' Alive; You Should Be Dancing by Bee Gees choreo. by Igor Shpilband
2025–2026	Poison; Something in Your Eyes; Poison by Bell Biv DeVoe choreo. by Igor Shpilband	Romeo and Juliet by Sergei Prokofiev; Op. 64: XIII. Dance of the Knights performed by Mark Ermler & Orchestra of the Royal Opera House, Covent Garden; Op. 64: 52. Juliet's Death performed by Boston Symphony Orchestra & Seiji Ozawa; Op. 64: XIII. Dance of the Knights performed by Mark Ermler & Orchestra of the Royal Opera House, Covent Garden choreo. by Benoît Richaud	Work Song by Hozier; Christmas Eve / Sarajevo 12/24 by Mykola Leontovych performed by Trans-Siberian Orchestra; Thrift Shop; Downtown by Macklemore & Ryan Lewis
2026–2027		Boléro; Composed by Maurice Ravel choreo. by Benoît Richaud	

=== Women's singles (for Cyprus) ===
Season	Short program	Free skating
2021–2022	Like Sugar by Chaka Khan choreo. by Brooke Castile O'Keefe	Amen by Amber Run choreo. by Brooke Castile O'Keefe
2020–2021	Vivre (from Notre-Dame de Paris) by Luc Plamondon, Riccardo Cocciante performed by Hélène Ségara choreo. by Brooke Castile O'Keefe	When the Party's Over; Bury a Friend; Bad Guy by Billie Eilish choreo. by Brooke Castile O'Keefe

== Competitive highlights ==
- GP – Event of the ISU Grand Prix Series
- JGP – Event of the ISU Junior Grand Prix Series
- CS – Event of the ISU Challenger Series
- TBD – Assigned
- WD – Withdrew from competition

=== Ice dance with Vadym Kolesnik (for the United States) ===
Competition placements at senior level
Season	2022–23	2023–24	2024–25	2025–26	2026–27
Winter Olympics				5th	
World Championships				3rd	
Four Continents Championships		4th	5th	1st	
Grand Prix Final				6th	
U.S. Championships	4th	6th	4th	2nd	
GP Cup of China				2nd	
GP Finland		5th	5th	3rd	
GP NHK Trophy					TBD
GP Skate America					1st
GP Skate Canada		5th	5th		
CS Golden Spin	3rd	2nd			
CS Kinoshita Group Cup				2nd	
CS Nebelhorn Trophy			3rd		
CS Nepela Memorial		4th			
CS Warsaw Cup			2nd		

=== Women's singles (for Cyprus) ===
Competition placements at senior level
Season	2020–21	2021–22
World Championships	36th	
CS Budapest Trophy	7th	
CS Cup of Austria		16th
CS Nebelhorn Trophy		9th
CS Warsaw Cup		14th
Challenge Cup	3rd	
Cranberry Cup		10th
Ice Star	5th	
Santa Claus Cup	2nd	

== Detailed results ==
=== Ice dance with Vadym Kolesnik (for the United States) ===
ISU personal best scores in the +5/-5 GOE System
Segment	Type	Score	Event
Total	TSS	209.20	2026 World Championships
Rhythm dance	TSS	84.21	2026 World Championships
Rhythm dance	TES	48.30	2026 World Championships
Rhythm dance	PCS	35.91	2026 World Championships
Free dance	TSS	124.99	2026 World Championships
Free dance	TES	69.85	2026 World Championships
Free dance	PCS	55.14	2026 World Championships

Results in the 2022–23 season
Date	Event	RD		FD		Total	
Date	Event	P	Score	P	Score	P	Score
Dec 7–10, 2022	(Croatia) 2022 CS Golden Spin of Zagreb	3	73.14	3	110.96	3	184.10
Jan 23–29, 2023	(United States) 2023 U.S. Championships	3	78.18	4	119.95	4	198.13

Results in the 2023–24 season
Date	Event	RD		FD		Total	
Date	Event	P	Score	P	Score	P	Score
Sep 28–30, 2023	(Slovakia) 2023 CS Nepela Memorial	3	75.61	3	111.67	4	187.28
Oct 27–29, 2023	2023 Skate Canada International	5	72.25	5	112.71	5	184.96
Nov 17–19, 2023	(Finland) 2023 Grand Prix of Espoo	5	72.13	5	111.65	5	183.78
Dec 6–9, 2023	(Croatia) 2023 CS Golden Spin of Zagreb	2	78.23	3	105.09	3	183.32
Jan 22–28, 2024	(United States) 2024 U.S. Championships	5	77.59	8	104.11	6	181.70
Jan 30 – Feb 4, 2024	(China) 2024 Four Continents Championships	4	75.76	4	117.31	4	193.07

Results in the 2024–25 season
Date	Event	RD		FD		Total	
Date	Event	P	Score	P	Score	P	Score
Sep 18–21, 2024	(Germany) 2024 CS Nebelhorn Trophy	3	77.47	3	116.87	3	194.34
Oct 25–27, 2024	2024 Skate Canada International	4	75.63	5	113.78	5	189.41
Nov 15–17, 2024	(Finland) 2024 Finlandia Trophy	6	72.72	3	116.76	5	189.48
Nov 20–24, 2024	(Poland) 2024 CS Warsaw Cup	2	77.20	2	118.87	2	196.07
Jan 20–26, 2025	(United States) 2025 U.S. Championships	3	82.13	4	122.04	4	204.17
Feb 19–23, 2025	(South Korea) 2025 Four Continents Championships	5	74.63	5	113.92	5	188.55

Results in the 2025–26 season
Date	Event	RD		FD		Total	
Date	Event	P	Score	P	Score	P	Score
Sep 5–7, 2025	(Japan) 2025 CS Kinoshita Group Cup	2	76.24	2	117.27	2	193.51
Oct 24–26, 2025	2025 Cup of China	2	80.43	2	121.84	2	202.27
Nov 21–23, 2025	(Finland) 2025 Finlandia Trophy	3	78.51	3	117.51	3	196.02
Dec 4–7, 2025	(Japan) 2025–26 Grand Prix Final	6	75.78	6	117.83	6	193.61
Jan 4–11, 2026	(United States) 2026 U.S. Championships	2	85.98	2	127.67	2	213.65
Jan 21–25, 2026	(China) 2026 Four Continents Championships	1	79.97	1	122.89	1	202.86
Feb 6–19, 2026	(Italy) 2026 Winter Olympics	6	83.53	5	123.19	5	206.72
Mar 24–29, 2026	(Czech Republic) 2026 World Championships	4	84.21	4	124.99	3	209.20

Results in the 2026–27 season
Date	Event	RD		FD		Total	
Date	Event	P	Score	P	Score	P	Score
Nov 13–15, 2026	(United States) 2026 Skate America	1	82.52	1	119.36	1	201.88

=== Women's singles (for Cyprus) ===
ISU personal best scores in the +5/-5 GOE System
Segment	Type	Score	Event
Total	TSS	158.16	2021 Nebelhorn Trophy
Short program	TSS	52.90	2021 Nebelhorn Trophy
Short program	TES	28.79	2021 Nebelhorn Trophy
Short program	PCS	27.88	2021 Cup of Austria
Free skating	TSS	105.26	2021 Nebelhorn Trophy
Free skating	TES	52.25	2021 Nebelhorn Trophy
Free skating	PCS	54.48	2021 Warsaw Cup

2021–22 season
Date	Event	SP	FS	Total
November 17–20, 2021	2021 CS Warsaw Cup	17; 50.30	13; 101.87	14; 152.17
November 11–14, 2021	2021 CS Cup of Austria	13; 50.02	16; 94.65	16; 144.67
September 22–25, 2021	2021 CS Nebelhorn Trophy	11; 52.90	9; 105.26	9; 158.16
2020–21 season
Date	Event	SP	FS	Total
March 22–28, 2021	2021 World Championships	36; 43.20	–	36; 43.20
February 26–28, 2021	2021 Challenge Cup	5; 55.05	2; 116.25	3; 171.30
November 26–29, 2020	2020 Santa Claus Cup	4; 51.07	1; 107.60	2; 158.67
Oct. 29 – Nov. 1, 2020	2020 Ice Star	10; 42.64	5; 97.31	5; 139.95
October 14–17, 2020	2020 CS Budapest Trophy	7; 46.86	8; 97.75	7; 144.61
