= 2025 U.S. Figure Skating Championships =

- Type: National championships
- Date: January 20 – 26
- Season: 2024–25
- Location: Wichita, Kansas
- Host: U.S. Figure Skating
- Venue: Intrust Bank Arena

Champions
- Men's singles: Ilia Malinin (Senior) & Lorenzo Elano (Junior)
- Women's singles: Amber Glenn (Senior) & Sophie Joline von Felten (Junior)
- Pairs: Alisa Efimova and Misha Mitrofanov (Senior) & Reagan Moss and Jakub Galbavy (Junior)
- Ice dance: Madison Chock and Evan Bates (Senior) & Hana Maria Aboian and Daniil Veselukhin (Junior)
- Previous: 2024 U.S. Championships
- Next: 2026 U.S. Championships

The 2025 U.S. Figure Skating Championships were held from January 20 to 26, 2025, at the Intrust Bank Arena in Wichita, Kansas. Medals were awarded in men's singles, women's singles, pair skating, and ice dance at the junior and senior levels. The results were part of the U.S. selection criteria for the 2025 Four Continents Championships, 2025 World Championships, and 2025 World Junior Championships. At the senior level, Ilia Malinin won the men's event, Amber Glenn won the women's event, Alisa Efimova and Misha Mitrofanov won the pairs event, and Madison Chock and Evan Bates won the ice dance event. At the junior level, Lorenzo Elano won the men's event, Sophie Joline von Felten won the women's event, Reagan Moss and Jakub Galbavy won the pairs event, and Hana Maria Aboian and Daniil Veselukhin won the ice dance event.

Three days after the competition, American Airlines Flight 5342 collided with a helicopter upon approach to Ronald Reagan Washington National Airport in Arlington, Virginia, and plunged into the Potomac River. All aboard were killed, including twenty-eight skaters, coaches, and family members returning from the U.S. Championships.

== Background ==
The U.S. Figure Skating Championships are an annual figure skating competition organized by U.S. Figure Skating to crown the national champions of the United States. The first U.S. Championships were held in 1914. The 2025 U.S. Championships were held from January 20 to 26 at the Intrust Bank Arena in Wichita, Kansas.

== Qualification ==
Skaters qualified for the U.S. Championships by either having a bye or by competing at the Pacific Coast Sectional Finals, Eastern Sectional Finals, Midwestern Sectional Finals, U.S. Ice Dance Finals, or U.S. Pairs Finals.

Senior-level skaters were eligible for a bye if they met any of the following criteria:

- Placing in the top five at the 2024 U.S. Figure Skating Championships
- Selection to the 2024 World Championship team
- Winning a medal at the 2022 Winter Olympics
- Qualifying for the same event at the Grand Prix Final or the Junior Grand Prix Final
- Competing at three international assignments classified as an ISU Grand Prix, ISU Junior Grand Prix, or ISU Challenger Series event

Junior-level skaters were eligible for a bye if they met any of the following criteria:

- Qualifying for the same event at the Junior Grand Prix Final
- Competing at three international assignments classified as an ISU Junior Grand Prix or ISU Challenger Series event

After accounting for all byes, the top placements from the Singles Sectionals, U.S. Pairs Finals, or U.S. Ice Dance Finals were then assigned until the maximum number of competitors for each event (eighteen in men's singles, eighteen in women's singles, twelve in pairs, and fifteen in ice dance) was met.

== Changes to preliminary assignments ==
U.S. Figure Skating published the initial list of entrants on November 25, 2024. These changes were reported after that original list was published.

Changes to preliminary entries
| Date | Discipline | Withdrew | Added | Notes | Ref. |
|---|---|---|---|---|---|
| January 2 | Senior women | Ava Marie Ziegler | Alexa Gasparotto | —N/a | |
| January 2 | Junior ice dance | Yahli Pedersen; Benjamin Starr | —N/a | | |
| January 6 | Senior women | Clare Seo | Brooke Gewalt | —N/a | |
| January 14 | Senior women | Isabeau Levito | Michelle Lee | Foot injury | |
| January 20 | Senior men | Jason Brown | Taira Shinohara | Equipment issues | |

== Required performance elements ==
=== Single skating ===
Men and women competing in single skating first performed a short program. Junior men performed their short programs on January 21, junior women on January 22, senior women on January 23, and senior men on January 25. Lasting 2 minutes 40 seconds (+/− 10 seconds), the short program had to include the following elements:

For junior men: one double or triple Axel; one double or triple flip; one jump combination consisting of a double jump and a triple jump or two triple jumps; one flying camel spin; one sit spin with a change of foot; one spin combination with a change of foot; and a step sequence using the full ice surface.

For junior women: one double Axel; one double or triple flip; one jump combination consisting of two double jumps, one double jump and one triple jump, or two triple jumps; one flying camel spin; one layback spin, sideways leaning spin, or sit spin without a change of foot; one spin combination with a change of foot; and one step sequence using the full ice surface.

For senior men: one double or triple Axel; one triple or quadruple jump; one jump combination consisting of a double jump and a triple jump, two triple jumps, or a quadruple jump and a double jump or triple jump; one flying spin; one camel spin or sit spin with a change of foot; one spin combination with a change of foot; and a step sequence using the full ice surface.

For senior women: one double or triple Axel; one triple jump; one jump combination consisting of a double jump and a triple jump, or two triple jumps; one flying spin; one layback spin, sideways leaning spin, camel spin, or sit spin without a change of foot; one spin combination with a change of foot; and one step sequence using the full ice surface.

Men and women competing in single skating finished their competition with free skating. Junior men performed their free skates on January 22, junior women on January 23, senior women on January 24, and senior men on January 26. Lasting 4 minutes (+/− 10 seconds), the free skate had to include the following:

For junior men and women: seven jump elements, of which one had to be an Axel-type jump; three spins, of which one had to be a spin combination, one had to be a flying spin, and one had to be a spin with only one position; and a choreographic sequence.

For senior men and women: seven jump elements, of which one had to be an Axel-type jump; three spins, of which one had to be a spin combination, one had to be a flying spin, and one had to be a spin with only one position; a step sequence; and a choreographic sequence.

=== Pair skating ===
Couples competing in pair skating also first performed a short program. Junior pair teams performed their short program on January 21, and senior teams on January 23. Lasting 2 minutes 40 seconds (+/− 10 seconds), the short program had to include the following elements:

For junior couples: one hand-to-hand pair lift, one double or triple twist lift, one double or triple Salchow throw jump, one double flip or double Axel solo jump, one solo spin combination with a change of foot, one death spiral, and a step sequence using the full ice surface.

For senior couples: one hand-to-hand pair lift, one double or triple twist lift, one double or triple throw jump, one double or triple solo jump, one solo spin combination with a change of foot, one death spiral, and a step sequence using the full ice surface.

All couples performed their free skates on January 25. Lasting 3 minutes 30 seconds (+/− 10 seconds) for juniors, or 4 minutes (+/− 10 seconds) for seniors, the free skate had to include the following:

For junior couples: two pair lifts, one twist lift, two different throw jumps, one solo jump, one jump combination or sequence, one pair spin combination, one death spiral, and a choreographic sequence.

For senior couples: three pair lifts, one twist lift, two different throw jumps, one solo jump, one jump combination or sequence, one pair spin combination, one death spiral, and a choreographic sequence.

=== Ice dance ===
Couples competing in ice dance first performed a rhythm dance. Junior ice dance teams performed their rhythm dances on January 21, while senior teams performed theirs on January 24. Lasting 2 minutes 50 seconds (+/− 10 seconds), the theme of the rhythm dance for this season was "social dances and styles of the 1950s, 1960s, and 1970s". Examples of applicable dance styles included Rock and Roll, the jitterbug, the twist, the Hustle, and disco. The rhythm dance had to include the following elements:

For junior couples: two sequences of the paso doble, one dance lift, one set of sequential twizzles, and one step sequence while not in hold.

For senior couples: one pattern dance step sequence, one choreographic rhythm sequence, one dance lift, one set of sequential twizzles, and one step sequence while not in hold.

All couples performed their free dances on January 25. Lasting 3 minutes 30 seconds (+/− 10 seconds) for juniors, or 4 minutes (+/− 10 seconds) for seniors, and had to include the following:

For junior couples: two dance lifts or one combination lift, one dance spin, one set of synchronized twizzles, one step sequence in hold, one step sequence while on one skate and not in hold, and two choreographic elements.

For senior couples: three dance lifts or one dance lift and one combination lift; one dance spin; one set of synchronized twizzles; one step sequence in hold; one step sequence while on one skate and not in hold; and three choreographic elements.

== Judging ==
Skaters were judged according to the required technical elements of their program (such as jumps and spins), as well as the overall presentation of their program, based on three program components (skating skills, presentation, and composition). Each technical element in a figure skating performance was assigned a predetermined base point value and scored by a panel of nine judges on a scale from −5 to +5 based on the quality of its execution. Each Grade of Execution (GOE) from –5 to +5 was assigned a value as indicated on the Scale of Values. For example, a triple Axel was worth a base value of 8.00 points, and a GOE of +3 was worth 2.40 points, so a triple Axel with a GOE of +3 earned 10.40 points. The judging panel's GOE for each element was determined by calculating the trimmed mean (the average after discarding the highest and lowest scores). The panel's scores for all elements were added together to generate a Total Elements Score. At the same time, the judges evaluated each performance based on the five aforementioned program components and assigned each a score from 0.25 to 10 in 0.25-point increments. The judging panel's final score for each program component was also determined by calculating the trimmed mean. Those scores were then multiplied by the factor shown on the chart below; the results were added together to generate a total Program Component Score.

Program component factoring
| Discipline | Short program or Rhythm dance | Free skate or Free dance |
|---|---|---|
| Men | 1.67 | 3.33 |
| Women | 1.33 | 2.67 |
| Pairs | 1.33 | 2.67 |
| Ice dance | 1.33 | 2.00 |

Deductions were applied for certain violations, such as time infractions or falls. The Total Elements Score and Program Component Score were then added together, minus any deductions, to generate a final performance score for each skater or team.

== Medal summary ==
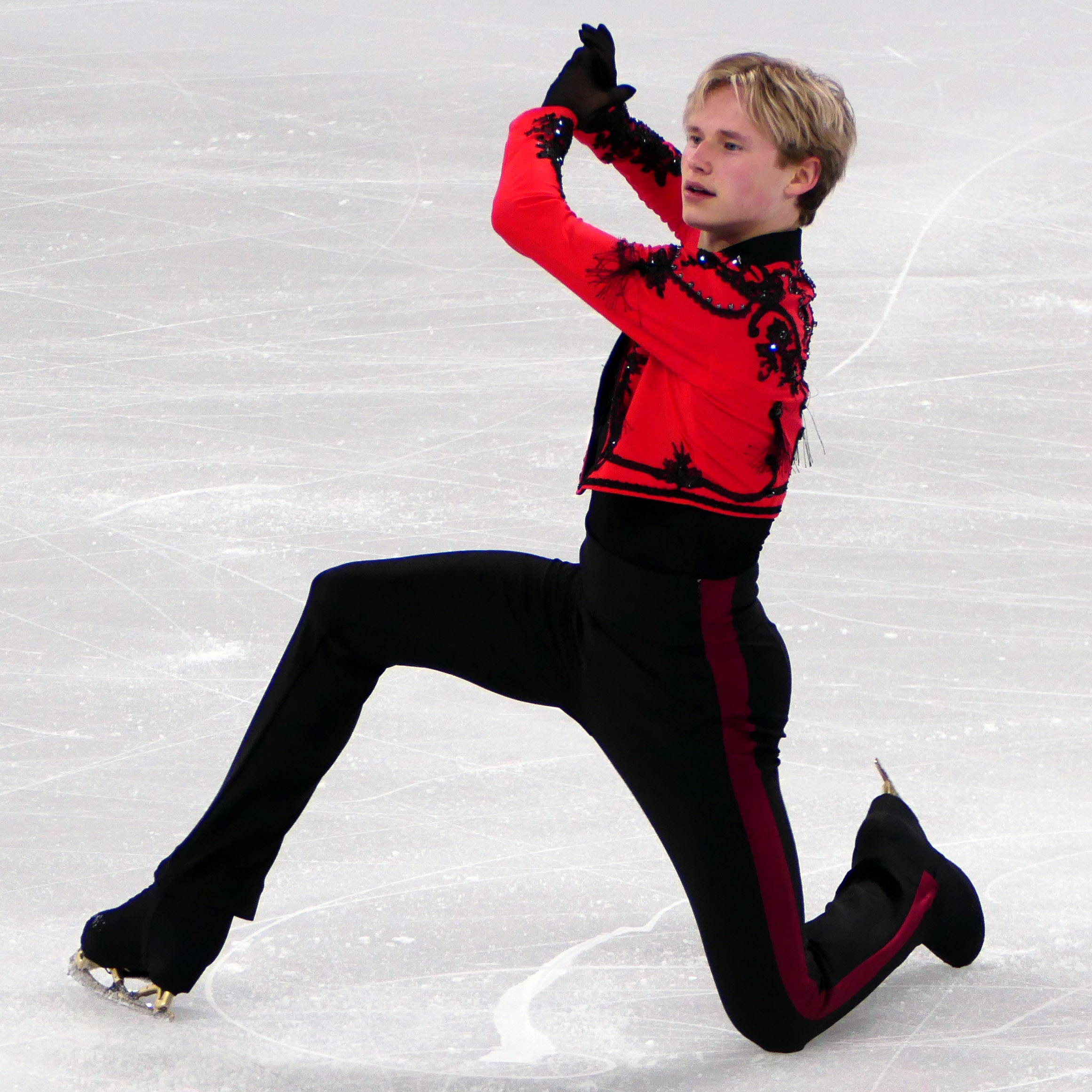
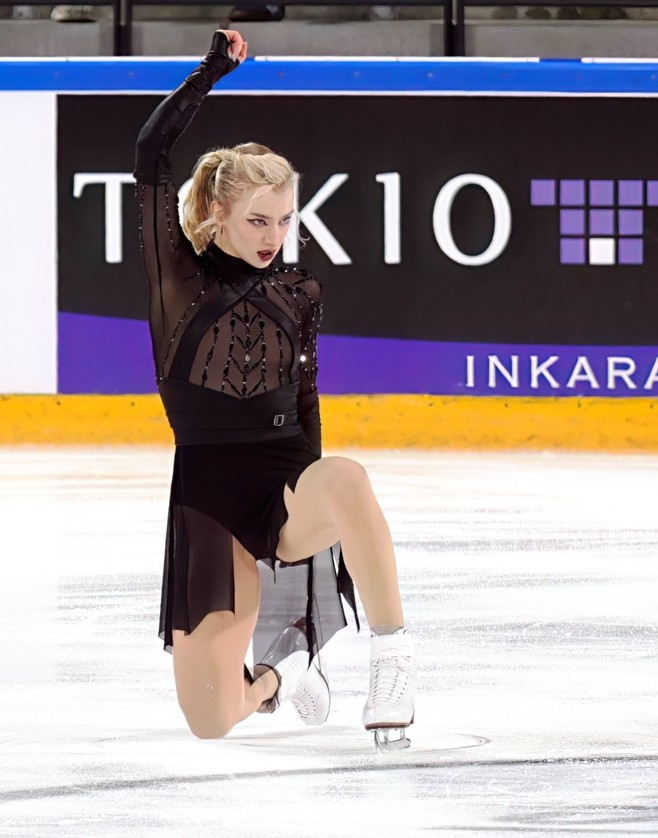
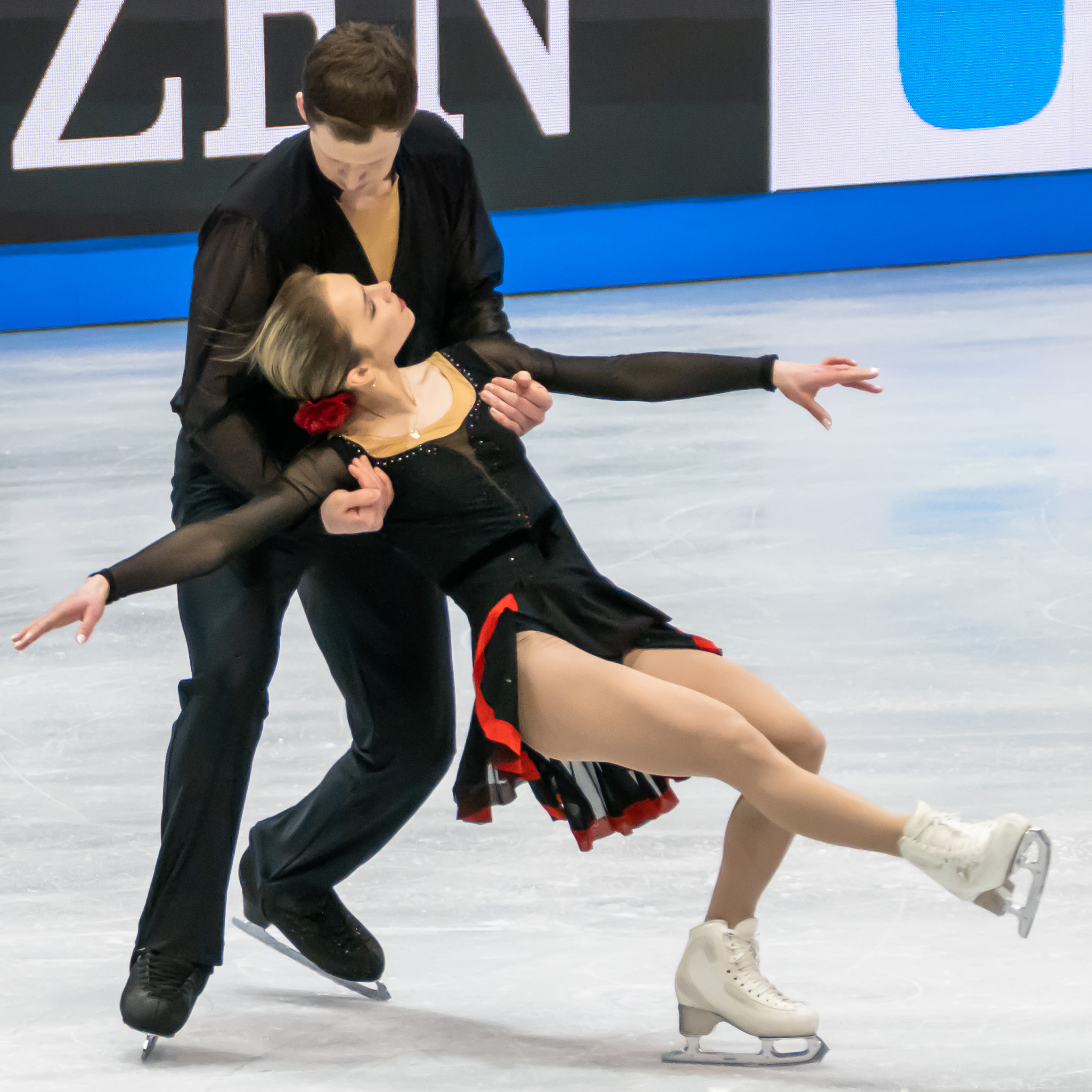
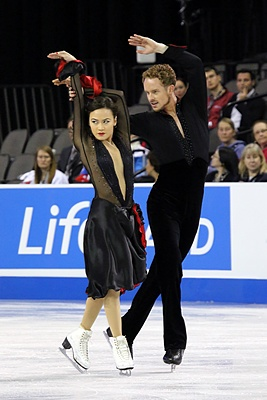
The 2025 U.S. champions: Ilia Malinin (men's singles); Amber Glenn (women's singles); Alisa Efimova and Misha Mitrofanov (pair skating); and Madison Chock and Evan Bates (ice dance)

=== Senior medalists ===
Senior medal recipients
| Discipline | Gold | Silver | Bronze | Pewter |
|---|---|---|---|---|
| Men | Ilia Malinin | Andrew Torgashev | Camden Pulkinen | Maxim Naumov |
| Women | Amber Glenn | Alysa Liu | Sarah Everhardt | Bradie Tennell |
| Pairs | Alisa Efimova; Misha Mitrofanov | Katie McBeath; Daniil Parkman | Ellie Kam; Danny O'Shea | Emily Chan; Spencer Howe |
| Ice dance | Madison Chock; Evan Bates | Christina Carreira; Anthony Ponomarenko | Caroline Green; Michael Parsons | Emilea Zingas; Vadym Kolesnik |

=== Junior medalists ===
Junior medal recipients
| Discipline | Gold | Silver | Bronze | Pewter |
|---|---|---|---|---|
| Men | Lorenzo Elano | Aleksandr Fegan | Patrick Blackwell | Kirk Haugeto |
| Women | Sophie Joline von Felten | Skylar Lautowa-Peguero | Jessica Jurka | Emilia Nemirovsky |
| Pairs | Reagan Moss; Jakub Galbavy | Olivia Flores; Luke Wang | Saya Carpenter; Jon Maravilla | Sofia Jarmoc; Luke Witkowski |
| Ice dance | Hana Maria Aboian; Daniil Veselukhin | Elianna Peal; Ethan Peal | Caroline Mullen; Brendan Mullen | Michelle Deych; Ryan Hu |

== Senior results ==
=== Men's singles ===
Ilia Malinin successfully landed a record six quadruple jumps during his free skate, but fell on his quadruple loop. He finished with an overall score 46.82 points higher than silver medalist Andrew Torgashev. Only Nathan Chen had won a U.S. Championship title by a greater margin, a feat which he accomplished twice. "It wasn't the perfect program that I exactly wanted," Malinin said in an interview. "One of the things I would say is maybe that I'm still not at my full potential yet, and that there's a lot bigger of a limit that I can go for."

Andrew Torgashev won the silver medal after what Sherry Chen of Golden Skate referred to as "two spectacular performances". "It is for sure validating whenever you're on the podium," Torgashev stated afterward. "It definitely gives motivation to keep training and keep pushing on." Camden Pulkinen won the bronze medal for the second year in a row. "I'm just really happy I was able to deliver here," Pulkinen said. "Standing on the podium for the second time is super validating."

Maxim Naumov had been in seventh place after the short program, but rallied back with a "spectacular" free skate to finish in fourth place and win the pewter medal. His parents, Evgenia Shishkova and Vadim Naumov, died three days later in the crash of American Airlines Flight 5342.

Men's results
| Rank | Skater | Total | SP | | FS | |
|---|---|---|---|---|---|---|
| 1st place, gold medalist(s) | Ilia Malinin | 333.31 | 1 | 114.08 | 1 | 219.23 |
| 2nd place, silver medalist(s) | Andrew Torgashev | 286.49 | 2 | 94.94 | 2 | 191.55 |
| 3rd place, bronze medalist(s) | Camden Pulkinen | 252.92 | 4 | 88.76 | 4 | 164.16 |
| 4 | Maxim Naumov | 248.16 | 7 | 82.41 | 3 | 165.75 |
| 5 | Jimmy Ma | 236.78 | 3 | 91.91 | 7 | 144.87 |
| 6 | Tomoki Hiwatashi | 233.65 | 10 | 75.21 | 5 | 158.44 |
| 7 | Jacob Sanchez | 229.53 | 6 | 82.64 | 6 | 146.89 |
| 8 | Liam Kapeikis | 213.70 | 5 | 84.01 | 14 | 129.69 |
| 9 | Michael Xie | 211.60 | 11 | 74.19 | 9 | 137.41 |
| 10 | Samuel Mindra | 209.95 | 9 | 75.57 | 10 | 134.38 |
| 11 | Daniel Martynov | 207.32 | 8 | 81.89 | 15 | 125.43 |
| 12 | Beck Strommer | 203.02 | 12 | 72.26 | 12 | 130.76 |
| 13 | Emmanuel Savary | 200.19 | 14 | 70.48 | 13 | 129.71 |
| 14 | Goku Endo | 198.37 | 18 | 58.99 | 8 | 139.38 |
| 15 | Kai Kovar | 190.92 | 17 | 59.15 | 11 | 131.77 |
| 16 | Lucius Kazanecki | 190.60 | 13 | 70.60 | 18 | 120.00 |
| 17 | Joseph Klein | 183.73 | 16 | 60.05 | 16 | 123.68 |
| 18 | Taira Shinohara | 182.63 | 15 | 61.49 | 17 | 121.14 |

=== Women's singles ===
Amber Glenn defeated silver medalist Alysa Liu by a margin of just 1.46 points, which was the second-narrowest victory in the history of the women's event. Only Kimmie Meissner had won a women's championship title by a narrower margin, when she defeated Emily Hughes by .82 points in 2007. Glenn had been in third place after the short program, trailing Liu by over 5 points, but rallied back in the free skate with a performance that included the only triple Axel of the event. Alysa Liu had retired from competitive skating after the 2022 Winter Olympics, but returned after two and half years when she realized she missed skating. Her last appearance at the U.S. Championships had been in 2022, when she was forced to withdraw mid-competition after testing positive for COVID-19.

Women's results
| Rank | Skater | Total | SP | | FS | |
|---|---|---|---|---|---|---|
| 1st place, gold medalist(s) | Amber Glenn | 216.79 | 3 | 70.91 | 1 | 145.88 |
| 2nd place, silver medalist(s) | Alysa Liu | 215.33 | 1 | 76.36 | 2 | 138.97 |
| 3rd place, bronze medalist(s) | Sarah Everhardt | 207.36 | 4 | 70.72 | 3 | 136.64 |
| 4 | Bradie Tennell | 199.94 | 2 | 71.23 | 4 | 128.71 |
| 5 | Sherry Zhang | 188.48 | 5 | 67.42 | 7 | 121.06 |
| 6 | Starr Andrews | 185.97 | 12 | 59.45 | 5 | 126.52 |
| 7 | Josephine Lee | 182.69 | 10 | 60.10 | 6 | 122.59 |
| 8 | Elyce Lin-Gracey | 179.22 | 8 | 61.47 | 9 | 117.75 |
| 9 | Sonja Hilmer | 178.54 | 11 | 59.57 | 8 | 118.97 |
| 10 | Logan Higase-Chen | 175.82 | 6 | 63.23 | 10 | 112.59 |
| 11 | Mia Kalin | 168.43 | 7 | 62.07 | 11 | 106.36 |
| 12 | Lindsay Thorngren | 159.88 | 9 | 60.99 | 12 | 98.89 |
| 13 | Alexa Gasparotto | 151.46 | 15 | 52.61 | 13 | 98.85 |
| 14 | Brooke Gewalt | 147.69 | 14 | 52.84 | 14 | 94.85 |
| 15 | Alina Bonillo | 144.28 | 13 | 56.42 | 16 | 87.86 |
| 16 | Michelle Lee | 139.60 | 16 | 48.71 | 15 | 90.89 |
| 17 | Ting Cui | 126.63 | 18 | 43.94 | 17 | 82.69 |
| 18 | Alex Evans | 121.71 | 17 | 45.43 | 18 | 76.28 |

=== Pairs ===
Reigning champions Ellie Kam and Daniel O'Shea, who had led in the pairs event after their short program, finished in third place after a series of mistakes in their free skate, which included a fall for both skaters on their final lift. Alisa Efimova and Misha Mitrofanov ended up winning the competition, rallying back from third place with a new personal best in the free skate. Katie McBeath and Daniil Parkman also scored a new personal best in the free skate to win the silver medals. "I've been close, just off the podium twice," McBeath stated in an interview. "I was fifth once [with previous partner Nathan Bartholomay] and last year with Daniil, so this will be my first medal and I'm so happy we get to share it."

Pairs results
| Rank | Team | Total | SP | | FS | |
|---|---|---|---|---|---|---|
| 1st place, gold medalist(s) | Alisa Efimova; Misha Mitrofanov | 211.90 | 3 | 69.03 | 1 | 142.87 |
| 2nd place, silver medalist(s) | Katie McBeath; Daniil Parkman | 190.57 | 4 | 62.92 | 2 | 127.65 |
| 3rd place, bronze medalist(s) | Ellie Kam; Daniel O'Shea | 189.57 | 1 | 77.19 | 5 | 112.38 |
| 4 | Emily Chan; Spencer Akira Howe | 183.95 | 2 | 69.10 | 4 | 114.85 |
| 5 | Audrey Shin; Balázs Nagy | 182.67 | 5 | 62.06 | 3 | 120.61 |
| 6 | Naomi Williams; Lachlan Lewer | 166.08 | 7 | 58.90 | 7 | 107.18 |
| 7 | Ellie Korytek; Timmy Chapman | 165.85 | 8 | 57.54 | 6 | 108.31 |
| 8 | Nica Digerness; Mark Sadusky | 159.31 | 9 | 57.02 | 8 | 102.29 |
| 9 | Isabelle Martins; Ryan Bedard | 158.27 | 6 | 61.83 | 9 | 96.44 |
| 10 | Sydney Cooke; Matthew Kennedy | 147.31 | 10 | 55.43 | 11 | 91.88 |
| 11 | Linzy Fitzpatrick; Keyton Bearinger | 139.78 | 12 | 44.25 | 10 | 95.53 |
| 12 | Grace Hanns; Danny Neudecker | 120.92 | 11 | 45.74 | 12 | 75.18 |

=== Ice dance ===
Madison Chock and Evan Bates won their sixth championship title in ice dance, tying the record held by Meryl Davis and Charlie White. Describing how Davis and White served as inspirations for them, Bates stated: "They were the ones who showed us what it takes to become the best team in the world, how hard they trained on the ice, how dedicated they were off the ice, how graceful they were." Chock and Bates scored nearly thirteen points more than silver medalists Christina Carreira and Anthony Ponomarenko. Carreira and Ponomarenko won the silver medals for the second year in a row. "This dance field is so strong, and we are proud to be on podium and to be part of the competition," Carreira stated afterward. Caroline Green and Michael Parsons finished in third place.

Ice dance results
| Rank | Team | Total | RD | | FD | |
|---|---|---|---|---|---|---|
| 1st place, gold medalist(s) | Madison Chock; Evan Bates | 223.52 | 1 | 92.16 | 1 | 131.36 |
| 2nd place, silver medalist(s) | Christina Carreira; Anthony Ponomarenko | 210.79 | 2 | 82.86 | 2 | 127.93 |
| 3rd place, bronze medalist(s) | Caroline Green; Michael Parsons | 205.37 | 4 | 82.13 | 3 | 123.24 |
| 4 | Emilea Zingas; Vadym Kolesnik | 204.17 | 3 | 82.13 | 4 | 122.04 |
| 5 | Oona Brown; Gage Brown | 193.37 | 5 | 77.38 | 6 | 115.99 |
| 6 | Emily Bratti; Ian Somerville | 193.28 | 7 | 75.25 | 5 | 118.03 |
| 7 | Katarina Wolfkostin; Dimitry Tsarevski | 186.83 | 6 | 76.27 | 8 | 110.56 |
| 8 | Eva Pate; Logan Bye | 183.24 | 8 | 73.64 | 9 | 109.60 |
| 9 | Leah Neset; Artem Markelov | 183.12 | 9 | 72.17 | 7 | 110.95 |
| 10 | Annabelle Morozov; Jeffrey Chen | 173.54 | 10 | 70.64 | 11 | 102.90 |
| 11 | Rafaella Koncius; Alexey Shchepetov | 169.90 | 13 | 63.48 | 10 | 106.42 |
| 12 | Vanessa Pham; Anton Spiridonov | 166.39 | 12 | 64.00 | 12 | 102.39 |
| 13 | Amy Cui; Jonathan Rogers | 154.95 | 11 | 68.78 | 14 | 86.17 |
| 14 | Grace Yi; Danila Savelev | 142.03 | 14 | 53.21 | 13 | 88.82 |
| 15 | Michela Melillo; Karl Schapfel | 123.23 | 15 | 47.02 | 15 | 76.21 |

== Junior results ==
=== Men's singles ===
Despite finishing second in both the short program and free skate, Lorenzo Elano ended up winning the gold medal. His free skate featured six triple jumps, of which four were in combination. "Honestly, coming off the ice, I wasn't sure about how my score was going to be," Elano stated. "So I'm happy with the outcome." Aleksandr Fegan, who won the bronze medal in the junior men's event in 2024, won the silver medal after delivering a free skate performance that included seven triple jumps and a challenging triple loop-double Axel-double loop jump sequence. Patrick Blackwell finished in first place after the short program with a new personal best score. "It was such an improvement from the Junior Grand Prix events [earlier in the season]," Blackwell stated after the short program. However, he fell four times during the free skate, ultimately finishing in third place.

Men's results
| Rank | Skater | Total | SP | | FS | |
|---|---|---|---|---|---|---|
| 1st place, gold medalist(s) | Lorenzo Elano | 202.65 | 2 | 71.60 | 2 | 131.05 |
| 2nd place, silver medalist(s) | Aleksandr Fegan | 201.64 | 3 | 70.29 | 1 | 131.35 |
| 3rd place, bronze medalist(s) | Patrick Blackwell | 195.77 | 1 | 77.73 | 4 | 118.04 |
| 4 | Kirk Haugeto | 184.29 | 5 | 62.43 | 3 | 121.86 |
| 5 | Vaclav Vasquez | 180.54 | 4 | 62.73 | 5 | 117.81 |
| 6 | Ryan William Azadpour | 169.37 | 10 | 53.76 | 6 | 115.61 |
| 7 | Alek Tankovic | 164.06 | 6 | 60.70 | 9 | 103.36 |
| 8 | Brendan Man | 161.11 | 7 | 56.74 | 8 | 104.37 |
| 9 | Jared Sedlis | 159.05 | 11 | 53.35 | 7 | 105.70 |
| 10 | Sergei Evseev | 152.43 | 12 | 50.00 | 10 | 102.43 |
| 11 | David Zhao | 150.20 | 8 | 56.71 | 15 | 93.49 |
| 12 | Arsen Meghavoryan | 148.37 | 9 | 55.27 | 16 | 93.10 |
| 13 | Evan Neuhaus | 145.36 | 15 | 48.61 | 11 | 96.75 |
| 14 | Isaac Fulton | 145.32 | 13 | 49.60 | 13 | 95.72 |
| 15 | Thomas Chen | 143.03 | 14 | 49.49 | 14 | 93.54 |
| 16 | Louis Mallane | 139.93 | 18 | 43.79 | 12 | 96.14 |
| 17 | Michael Jin | 128.59 | 17 | 44.72 | 17 | 83.87 |
| 18 | Ethan Yan | 127.32 | 16 | 45.67 | 18 | 81.65 |

=== Women's singles ===
Sophie Joline von Felten, who was in seventh place after the short program, stormed back in her free skate to win the junior women's title. In the process, she also became the first American woman to successfully perform a quadruple Salchow in competition. "I love to make history," Von Felten stated. "No one had ever landed a quad Salchow at nationals." Von Felten had set a similar record the year before when she became the first junior-level American woman to successfully land a triple Axel in competition. Skylar Lautowa-Peguero finished in second place after successfully performing seven triple jumps in her free skate. After the competition, Lautowa-Peguero stated: "I skated two clean programs at nationals, and I feel excited to keep going and have more opportunities in the future." Jessica Jurka also performed seven triple jumps in her free skate, and finished in third place.

Women's results
| Rank | Skater | Total | SP | | FS | |
|---|---|---|---|---|---|---|
| 1st place, gold medalist(s) | Sophie Joline von Felten | 188.84 | 7 | 57.02 | 1 | 131.82 |
| 2nd place, silver medalist(s) | Skylar Lautowa-Peguero | 188.00 | 1 | 63.94 | 2 | 124.06 |
| 3rd place, bronze medalist(s) | Jessica Jurka | 176.23 | 5 | 58.49 | 3 | 117.74 |
| 4 | Emilia Nemirovsky | 175.30 | 2 | 62.89 | 5 | 112.41 |
| 5 | Annika Chao | 175.05 | 4 | 58.71 | 4 | 116.34 |
| 6 | Angela Shao | 167.04 | 9 | 54.91 | 6 | 112.13 |
| 7 | Jiaying Ellyse Johnson | 165.82 | 3 | 61.68 | 9 | 104.14 |
| 8 | Sophia Bezkorovainaya | 163.68 | 8 | 54.92 | 8 | 108.76 |
| 9 | Hannah Kim | 161.88 | 6 | 58.34 | 10 | 103.54 |
| 10 | Alayna Coats | 153.46 | 15 | 44.40 | 7 | 109.06 |
| 11 | Teryn Kim | 148.63 | 12 | 49.44 | 11 | 99.19 |
| 12 | Cleo Park | 147.75 | 10 | 54.20 | 14 | 93.55 |
| 13 | Kaya Tiernan | 147.32 | 11 | 50.54 | 13 | 96.78 |
| 14 | Annabelle Wilkins | 139.02 | 13 | 48.00 | 15 | 91.02 |
| 15 | Mia Iwase | 138.69 | 17 | 39.70 | 12 | 98.99 |
| 16 | Ela Cui | 123.36 | 14 | 46.41 | 17 | 76.95 |
| 17 | Carina Tanabe | 123.05 | 16 | 40.51 | 16 | 82.54 |
| 18 | Maria Platonova | 102.58 | 18 | 32.77 | 18 | 69.81 |

=== Pair skating ===
Reagan Moss and Jakub Galbavy led after the short program, 0.11 points ahead of reigning champions Olivia Flores and Luke Wang. "We honestly have been training super well in terms of our short program and felt confident coming in here, so not what we hoped for," Wang said in an interview after the short program. Moss and Galbavy outscored their previous personal best by over twenty-five points to win the gold medals. Saya Carpenter and Jon Maravilla also scored new personal bests in both the free skate and overall total to win the bronze medals.

Pairs results
| Rank | Team | Total | SP | | FS | |
|---|---|---|---|---|---|---|
| 1st place, gold medalist(s) | Reagan Moss; Jakub Galbavy | 154.68 | 1 | 55.89 | 1 | 98.79 |
| 2nd place, silver medalist(s) | Olivia Flores; Luke Wang | 152.20 | 2 | 55.78 | 2 | 96.42 |
| 3rd place, bronze medalist(s) | Saya Carpenter; Jon Maravilla | 137.78 | 3 | 52.00 | 6 | 85.78 |
| 4 | Sofia Jarmoc; Luke Witkowski | 136.70 | 4 | 50.20 | 4 | 86.50 |
| 5 | Addyson McDanold; Aaron Felderbaum | 134.18 | 5 | 42.75 | 3 | 91.43 |
| 6 | Elizabeth Hansen; William Church | 127.11 | 7 | 41.06 | 5 | 86.05 |
| 7 | Graceann Gottschalk; Sam Herbert | 125.87 | 6 | 42.67 | 7 | 83.20 |
| 8 | Taisiya Shapovalova; Carter Griffin | 109.05 | 10 | 36.14 | 8 | 72.91 |
| 9 | Milada Kovar; Jared McPike | 100.93 | 8 | 38.62 | 10 | 62.31 |
| 10 | Mazie McFarland; Samir Andjorin | 100.52 | 9 | 36.49 | 9 | 64.03 |

=== Ice dance ===
Hana Maria Aboian and Daniil Veselukhin, who had been skating together for a little over a year, won the junior ice dance title. "It was one of my favorite skates," Aboian stated. "I'm proud of how we skated." Siblings Elliana and Ethan Peal scored a new total score personal best of 153 points to win the silver medals. "Part of the sport is getting judged on your performance, but we touched a lot of people's hearts with this performance, and we are really proud of that," Ethan Peal stated after their performance. Siblings Caroline and Brendan Mullen also scored a new personal best in the free dance to finish in third place.

Ice dance results
| Rank | Team | Total | RD | | FD | |
|---|---|---|---|---|---|---|
| 1st place, gold medalist(s) | Hana Maria Aboian; Daniil Veselukhin | 162.40 | 1 | 65.00 | 1 | 97.40 |
| 2nd place, silver medalist(s) | Elianna Peal; Ethan Peal | 153.00 | 2 | 64.23 | 3 | 88.77 |
| 3rd place, bronze medalist(s) | Caroline Mullen; Brendan Mullen | 148.51 | 5 | 56.41 | 2 | 92.10 |
| 4 | Michelle Deych; Ryan Hu | 135.45 | 6 | 55.49 | 4 | 79.96 |
| 5 | Olivia Ilin; Dylan Cain | 134.51 | 3 | 57.54 | 6 | 76.97 |
| 6 | Effie Chen; Kenny Eckert | 131.78 | 8 | 52.88 | 5 | 78.90 |
| 7 | Annelise Stapert; Maxim Korotcov | 124.74 | 7 | 54.75 | 10 | 69.99 |
| 8 | Emily Renzi; William Lissauer | 123.04 | 4 | 56.67 | 11 | 66.37 |
| 9 | Anaelle Kouevi; Yann Homawoo | 120.17 | 9 | 49.75 | 9 | 70.42 |
| 10 | Ja Yi Kirwan; Rowan Le Coq | 118.62 | 10 | 48.03 | 7 | 70.59 |
| 11 | Julia Epps; Blake Gilman | 115.32 | 11 | 44.75 | 8 | 70.57 |

== International team selections ==
=== World Championships ===
U.S. Figure Skating announced their representatives to the 2025 World Championships on January 25 and 26, 2025. The World Championships were held from March 25 to 30 in Boston, Massachusetts. American skaters won gold medals in three of the four events: Ilia Malinin in the men's event, Alysa Liu in the women's event, and Madison Chock and Evan Bates in the ice dance event.

U.S. delegation to the 2025 World Championships
| No. | Men | Women | Pairs | Ice dance |
|---|---|---|---|---|
| 1 | Jason Brown | Amber Glenn | Alisa Efimova; Misha Mitrofanov | Christina Carreira; Anthony Ponomarenko |
| 2 | Ilia Malinin | Isabeau Levito | Ellie Kam; Daniel O'Shea | Madison Chock; Evan Bates |
| 3 | Andrew Torgashev | Alysa Liu | —N/a | Caroline Green; Michael Parsons |

U.S. alternates to the 2025 World Championships
| No. | Men | Women | Pairs | Ice dance |
|---|---|---|---|---|
| 1 | Camden Pulkinen | Sarah Everhardt | Katie McBeath; Daniil Parkman | Emilea Zingas; Vadym Kolesnik |
| 2 | Maxim Naumov | Bradie Tennell | Emily Chan; Spencer Howe | Emily Bratti; Ian Somerville |
| 3 | Jimmy Ma | Starr Andrews | Audrey Shin; Balazs Nagy | Oona Brown; Gage Brown |

=== Four Continents Championships ===
U.S. Figure Skating announced their representatives to the 2025 Four Continents Championships on January 25 and 26, 2025. Amber Glenn withdrew from the competition on January 25; she was replaced by Bradie Tennell. Andrew Torgashev withdrew from the competition on January 29; Jimmy Ma was named as his replacement. Maxim Naumov withdrew from the competition after the death of his parents; his spot was assumed by Tomoki Hiwatashi. The Four Continents Championships were held from February 19 to 23 in Seoul, South Korea. Jimmy Ma won the bronze medal at the event.

U.S. delegation to the 2025 Four Continents Championships
| No. | Men | Women | Pairs | Ice dance |
|---|---|---|---|---|
| 1 | ~~Maxim Naumov~~ (withdrawn) | Sarah Everhardt | Alisa Efimova; Misha Mitrofanov | Christina Carreira; Anthony Ponomarenko |
| 2 | Camden Pulkinen | ~~Amber Glenn~~ (withdrawn) | Ellie Kam; Danny O'Shea | Madison Chock; Evan Bates |
| 3 | ~~Andrew Torgashev~~ (withdrawn) | Alysa Liu | Audrey Shin; Balazs Nagy | Emilea Zingas; Vadym Kolesnik |

U.S. alternates to the 2025 Four Continents Championships
| No. | Men | Women | Pairs | Ice dance |
|---|---|---|---|---|
| 1 | Jimmy Ma (called up) | Bradie Tennell (called up) | Emily Chan; Spencer Howe | Caroline Green; Michael Parsons |
| 2 | Tomoki Hiwatashi (called up) | Starr Andrews | Katie McBeath; Daniil Parkman | Emily Bratti; Ian Somerville |
| 3 | Daniel Martynov | Sonja Hilmer | Nica Digerness; Mark Sadusky | Oona Brown; Gage Brown |

=== World Junior Championships ===
U.S. Figure Skating announced their representatives to the 2025 World Junior Championships on January 25 and 26, 2025. The World Junior Championships were held from February 26 to March 1 in Debrecen, Hungary. Katarina Wolfkostin and Dimitry Tsarevski won silver medals in the ice dance event, while Elyce Lin-Gracey won the bronze medal in the women's event.

U.S. delegation to the 2025 World Junior Championships
| No. | Men | Women | Pairs | Ice dance |
|---|---|---|---|---|
| 1 | Patrick Blackwell | Elyce Lin-Gracey | Olivia Flores; Luke Wang | Hana Maria Aboian; Daniil Veselukhin |
| 2 | Jacob Sanchez | Sophie Joline von Felten | Reagan Moss; Jakub Galbavy | Caroline Mullen; Brendan Mullen |
| 3 | —N/a | —N/a | Naomi Williams; Lachlan Lewer | Katarina Wolfkostin; Dimitry Tsarevski |

U.S. alternates to the 2025 World Junior Championships
| No. | Men | Women | Pairs | Ice dance |
|---|---|---|---|---|
| 1 | Aleksandr Fegan | Logan Higase-Chen | Saya Carpenter; Jon Maravilla | Elianna Peal; Ethan Peal |
| 2 | Lorenzo Elano | Sherry Zhang | Addyson McDanold; Aaron Felderbaum | Olivia Ilin; Dylan Cain |
| 3 | Kai Kovar | Josephine Lee | Elizabeth Hansen; William Church | Michelle Deych; Ryan Hu |

== Crash of American Airlines Flight 5342 ==
On January 29, 2025, three days after the competition, American Airlines Flight 5342 collided with a U.S. Army helicopter upon approach to Ronald Reagan Washington National Airport in Arlington, Virginia, and plunged into the Potomac River. All sixty-four passengers and crew members aboard the flight were killed, including twenty-eight skaters, coaches, and family members who were returning from a national development camp, which had been held after the 2025 U.S. Championships. Among the fatalities were Inna Volyanskaya, who had competed in pair skating for the Soviet Union and was working as a coach in Ashburn, Virginia; Alexandr Kirsanov, who had competed in ice dance for Russia, Azerbaijan, and the United States; and Evgenia Shishkova and Vadim Naumov, who had competed in pair skating for the Soviet Union and Russia, and had won the 1994 World Figure Skating Championships. They were also the parents of Maxim Naumov, who competed in men's singles and had just won the pewter medal at the 2025 U.S. Championships.

"Once again, Maxim made us all proud, getting on to the podium at Nationals after 7th place in the short. This beautiful and emotional performance is a result of a team work. Huge thanks to Serhii and Irina Vaypan and of course to Adam Blake for his wonderful choreography of a classic! Maxim has earned his place in the team of 4 Continents."

— Vadim Naumov and Evgenia Shishkova's final post on Instagram (January 27, 2025)

The skaters lost in the crash represented the Skating Club of Boston, the Skating Club of Northern Virginia, the Washington Figure Skating Club, the University of Delaware Figure Skating Club, and the ION Figure Skating Club.

On March 2, 2025, a tribute event, Legacy on Ice, was held at the Capital One Arena in Washington, D.C., to raise funds for the U.S. Figure Skating Family Support Fund, Greater Washington Community Foundation's "DCA Together Relief Fund", and the DC Fire & EMS Foundation. The event was hosted by Brian Boitano and Kristi Yamaguchi, and featured performances and guest appearances from numerous current and retired skaters, including Ilia Malinin, Amber Glenn, Madison Chock, Evan Bates, Alysa Liu, Nathan Chen, Scott Hamilton, and Johnny Weir, as well as members of local skating clubs and the Skating Club of Boston.

== Works cited ==
- "Special Regulations & Technical Rules – Single & Pair Skating and Ice Dance 2024" (PDF). International Skating Union. Archived (PDF) from the original on November 9, 2024.
- "The 2024–25 Official U.S. Figure Skating Rulebook" (PDF). U.S. Figure Skating. July 2024. Archived from the original (PDF) on July 19, 2024.
