= Sophie Joline von Felten =

Swiss-American competitive junior figure skater

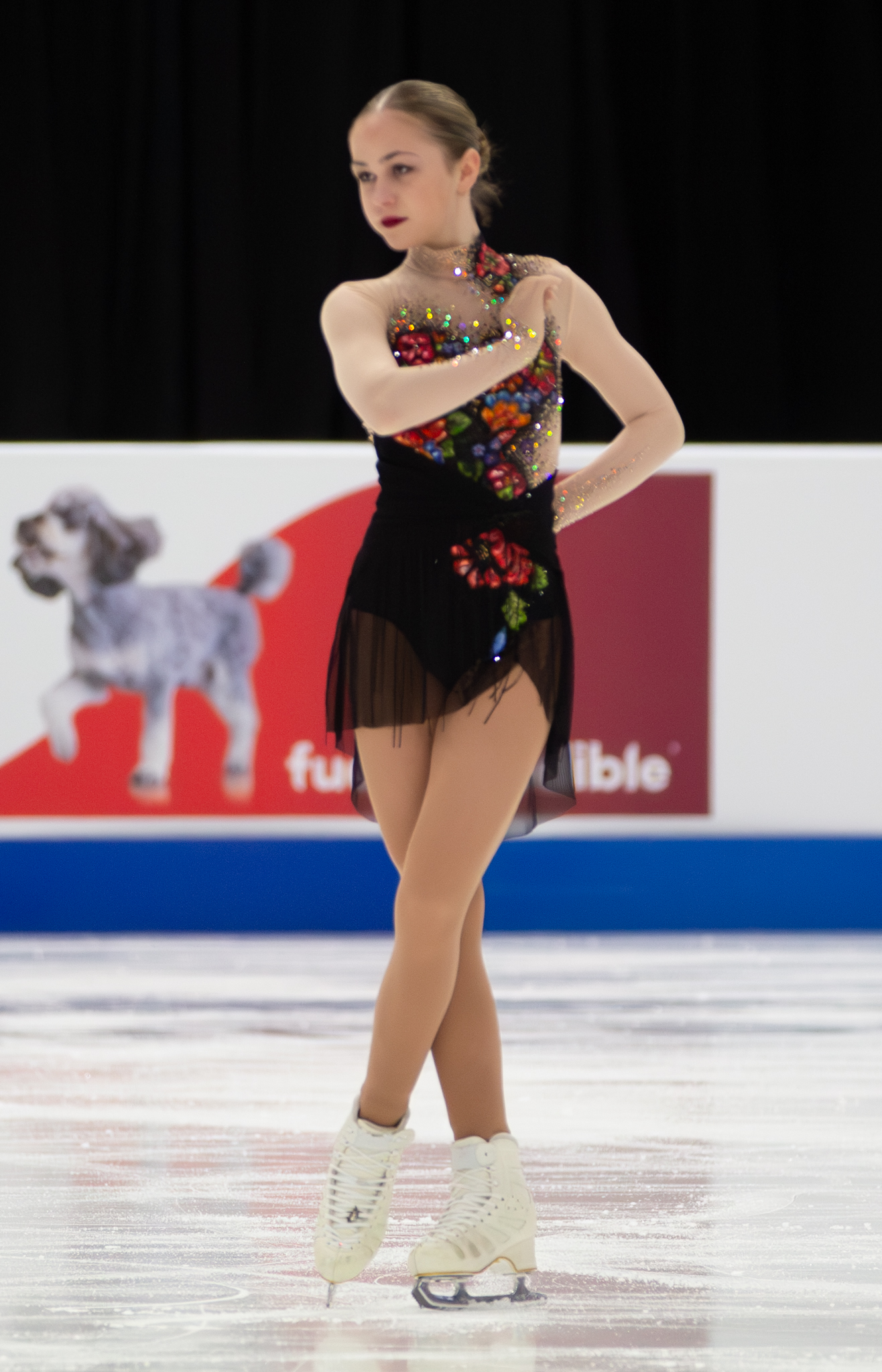
- Sophie at the 2026 U.S. Championships

Personal information
- Full name: Sophie Joline von Felten
- Born: 19 April 2009 (age 17) Zürich, Switzerland
- Home town: Canton, Massachusetts, U.S.
- Height: 160 cm (5 ft 3 in)

Figure skating career
- Country: United States (since 2023); Switzerland (until 2022)
- Coach: Melissa Gregory; Denis Petukhov
- Skating club: The Skating Club of New York
- Began skating: 2012

Sophie Joline von Felten (born April 19, 2009) is a Swiss figure skater who currently competes for the United States. She is the 2025 U.S. Junior champion and a three-time ISU Junior Grand Prix medalist. She has represented the United States at the World Junior Championships two times (2025, 2026).

In 2024, she became the first junior woman to land a triple Axel at the U.S. Championships. Additionally, she was the first U.S. woman to land a quadruple Salchow in competition at any level, and the third U.S. woman to land any quadruple jump.

== Personal life ==
Sophie was born in Zürich, Switzerland on April 19, 2009, the only child of Daniel and Inna von Felten. Her mother, who is originally from Russia, was a competitive pairs figure skater as a child. Von Felten played competitive tennis until the age of 10.

Von Felten is fluent in English, German, Swiss German, and Russian. She is in the process of obtaining a green card with the eventual goal of gaining U.S. citizenship.

== Career ==
=== Skating for Switzerland ===
==== Early years ====
Von Felten began skating at three years old after her mother took her to a rink in Paris. One of her early coaches was Yulia Lavrenchuk.

==== 2022–23 season: Junior international debut ====
Splitting her time between training under Patrick Addeo in Luzern, Switzerland and Rafael and Vera Arutyunyan in Irvine, California, United States, Von Felten made her junior international debut for Switzerland on the 2022–23 Junior Grand Prix series. She finished twenty-fifth at 2022 JGP Latvia and twenty-third at 2022 JGP Poland.

She subsequently went on to finish eighth on the junior level at the 2022 NRW Trophy before closing her season with a silver medal at the 2023 Swiss Junior Championships.

Following the season, Von Felten made the decision to permanently remain in the United States with her mother and ultimately begin representing the country. Her father continues to live in Lucerne and supports her skating from afar.

=== Skating for the United States ===
==== 2023–24 season ====
Prior to the season, Von Felten moved to Norwood, Massachusetts to train under Olga Ganicheva and Alexey Letov at the Skating Club of Boston. After competing in several U.S. domestic competitions in the fall, Von Felten made her national debut in January at the 2024 U.S. Junior Championships where she finished in ninth place.

==== 2024–25 season: Junior Grand Prix gold ====
Von Felten made her junior international debut for the United States at 2024 Cranberry Cup, where she placed sixth. She then went on to compete on the Junior Grand Prix series, winning the gold medal at 2024 JGP Slovenia. The following week, she placed thirteenth at 2024 JGP China.

In January, Von Felten won the national title at the 2025 U.S. Junior Championships. Her free skate at the event included two cleanly landed triple Axels and an attempted quadruple Salchow that was deemed as landed on the quarter.

Selected to compete at the 2025 World Junior Championships, Von Felten concluded her season by finishing the event in eighteenth place.

==== 2025–2026 season: Two Junior Grand Prix medals ====
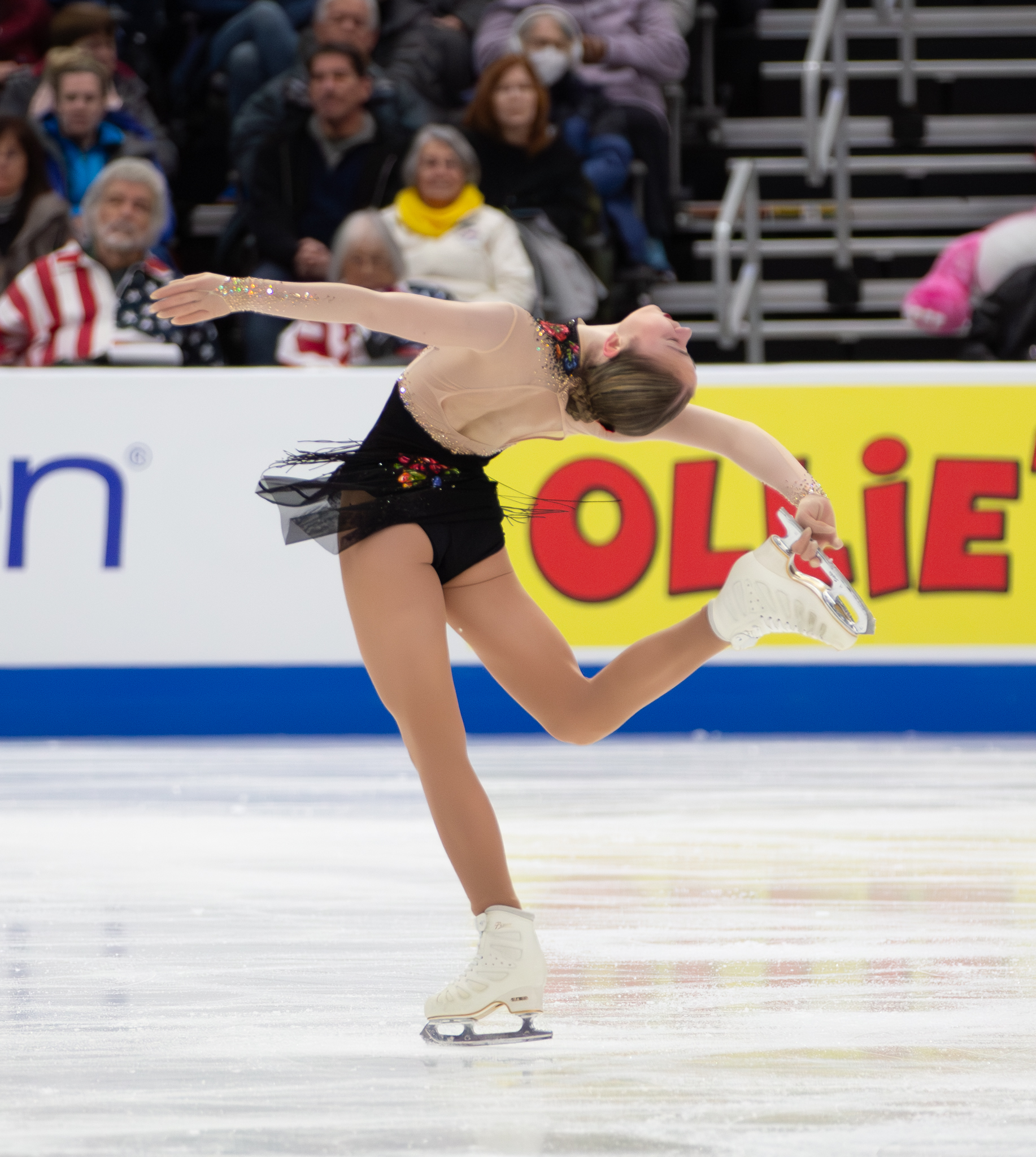
Von Felten performing a catchfoot layback spin at the 2026 U.S. Figure Skating Championships.

Before start of the season, Von Felten joined the Skating Club of Boston's junior Theatre On Ice team, Act I of Boston, to engage in performance skating, aiming to improve her presentation skills when competing. She also worked with choreographer, Adam Solya, to create a short program in dedication of the skaters that lost their lives in the 2025 Potomac River mid-air collision as two of her former training mates, Jinna Han and Spencer Lane, were among the victims.

Von Felten's first international event of the season was the 2025 Cranberry Cup, where she won the gold medal in the junior category. She then went on to win bronze at both of her assigned Junior Grand Prix events in Turkey and Poland. Following the latter event, it was announced that former ice dancers, Melissa Gregory and Denis Petukhov had joined Von Felten's coaching team.

In January, Von Felten made her senior national debut at the 2026 U.S. Championships. She placed tenth in the short program after falling on an under-rotated triple Axel and sixth in the free skate after successfully landing two clean triple Axel jumps to finish sixth overall.

Selected to compete at the 2026 World Junior Championships, Von Felten placed eighth in the short program which included a triple Axel-triple toe combination. Although the triple toe was deemed under rotated, she became the first junior woman to successfully backload a triple axel in the short program. She went on to place fourteenth in the free skate segment and twelfth overall.

In May, it was announced that Von Felten had changed skating clubs, electing to continue her training at the International Skating Center of Connecticut in Simsbury, Connecticut under Vladimir and Elena Petrenko.

==== 2026–27 season: Senior debut ====
Von Felten opened her season in September by finishing 4th at the 2026 CS Nepela Memorial in her senior debut. In an interview after the event with Eurosport, she was happy with her performance and only had 1 week of preparation before the event. Following this, von Felten placed twenty-fifth at the 2026 CS Budapest Trophy after making multiple jump errors in her free skate.

Von Felten made her senior Grand Prix debut in November at the 2026 Cup of China. Making errors on all of her jumping passes in the short program, von Felten placed ninth in that segment. She made a comeback in the free skate, skating an almost clean program which led her to place sixth in that segment. She concluded the event in seventh place overall. "I’m really happy that I made a comeback from the not really well short program and I landed the triple AxeI. I still have a back to back Grand Prix to go. So hopefully I can carry this energy to the next competition. One of the biggest goals that I’m working on is to get more consistent. It’s my first senior year. I hope to skate well in every competition, try to skate and do my best as I can and enjoy it." The following week, von Felten competed at the 2026 Skate America where she placed tenth overall.

== Programs ==
Competition and exhibition programs by season
Season	Short program	Free skate program	Exhibition program
2022–23	"Ballo delle furie": From Orfeo ed Euridice; Composed by Christoph Willibald Gluck; Performed by Münchener Bach-Orchester & Karl Richter; Choreo. by Nadezda Kanaeva & Alina Milevskaia	Money Heist: 1. My Life Is Going On (Burak Yeter Remix); Performed by Burak Yeter & Cecilia Krull; 2. My Life Is Going On; Performed by Cecilia Krull; 3. Bella ciao (Elyella Remix); Performed by Manu Pilas & ELYELLA; 4. Bella ciao; Performed by Najwa Nimri; 5. Lacrimosa; Composed by Wolfgang Amadeus Mozart; Performed by Universal Production Music; Choreo. by Nadezda Kanaeva & Alina Milevskaia	—N/a
2024–25	"Sweet Dreams (Are Made of This)": Performed by Eurythmics; Choreo. by Adam Solya	Romeo and Juliet: 1. O Verona; From Romeo + Juliet; Composed by Craig Armstrong; 2. Kissing You; From Romeo + Juliet; Performed by Des'ree; 3. Forbidden Love; From Romeo & Juliet; Composed by Abel Korzeniowski; 4. Montagues and Capulets; From Romeo and Juliet; Composed by Sergei Prokofiev; Performed by Richard Clayderman; Choreo. by Adam Solya	—N/a
2025–26	"Tribute": 1. I Will Never Abandon You; Composed by Efisio Cross; 2. Cassiopeia; Composed by Jonathon Deering, Power-Haus, & Ros Stephen; Choreo. by Adam Solya	Frida: 1. Benediction and Dream; 2. Self-Portrait With Hair Down; 3. The Floating Bed; 4. Alcoba Azul; Composed by Elliot Goldenthal; Performed by Lila Downs; Choreo. by Adam Solya	—N/a
2026–27	"Michael Jackson Medley": Choreo. by Melissa Gregory & Denis Petukhov	Medley: 1. The Power of Mind; Composed by Philippe Briand, Gabriel SABAN, & Anne-Sophie Versnaeyen; 2. Motion III; Composed by Rone, Vanessa Wagner, François-Xavier Roth, & Les Siècles; Choreo. by Rohene Ward	—N/a

== Competitive highlights ==
=== Skating for the United States ===
- GP – Event of the ISU Grand Prix Series
- JGP – Event of the ISU Junior Grand Prix Series
- CS – Event of the ISU Challenger Series
- TBD – Assigned
- WD - Withdrawn

Competition placements at senior level
Season	2025–26	2026–27
U.S. Championships	6th	
GP Cup of China		7th
GP Skate America		10th
CS Budapest Trophy		25th
CS Cranberry Cup		WD
CS Nepela Memorial		4th

Competition placements at junior level
Season	2023–24	2024–25	2025–26
World Junior Championships		18th	12th
U.S. Championships	9th	1st	
JGP China		13th	
JGP Poland			3rd
JGP Slovenia		1st	
JGP Turkey			3rd
Cranberry Cup		6th	1st

=== Skating for Switzerland ===
Competition placements at junior level
Season	2022–23
Swiss Junior Championships	2nd
NRW Trophy	8th
JGP Poland	23rd
JGP Latvia	25th

== Detailed results ==
=== Skating for the United States ===
ISU personal best scores in the +5/-5 GOE System
Segment	Type	Score	Event
Total	TSS	197.41	2024 JGP Slovenia
Short program	TSS	68.17	2025 JGP Turkey
Short program	TES	40.06	2024 JGP Slovenia
Short program	PCS	29.38	2025 JGP Turkey
Free skating	TSS	132.43	2025 JGP Poland
Free skating	TES	76.77	2024 JGP Slovenia
Free skating	PCS	56.18	2025 JGP Poland

==== Senior level ====
Results in the 2025–26 season
Date	Event	SP		FS		Total	
Date	Event	P	Score	P	Score	P	Score
Jan 4–11, 2026	(United States) 2026 U.S. Championships	10	60.68	6	130.12	6	190.80

Results in the 2026–27 season
Date	Event	SP		FS		Total	
Date	Event	P	Score	P	Score	P	Score
Sep 24–27, 2026	(Slovakia) 2026 CS Nepela Memorial	5	60.15	4	115.49	4	175.64
Oct 16–18, 2026	(Hungary) 2026 CS Budapest Trophy	11	57.72	29	73.33	25	131.05
Nov 6–8, 2026	2026 Cup of China	9	60.19	6	129.02	7	189.21
Nov 13–15, 2026	(United States) 2026 Skate America	10	61.23	8	124.93	10	186.16

==== Junior level ====
Results in the 2023–24 season
Date	Event	SP		FS		Total	
Date	Event	P	Score	P	Score	P	Score
Jan 22–28, 2024	(United States) 2024 U.S. Championships (Junior)	7	56.31	11	94.26	9	150.57

Results in the 2024–25 season
Date	Event	SP		FS		Total	
Date	Event	P	Score	P	Score	P	Score
Aug 8–11, 2024	(United States) 2024 Cranberry Cup	9	48.92	6	103.80	6	152.72
Oct 2–5, 2024	2024 JGP Slovenia	4	66.65	1	130.76	1	197.41
Oct 9–12, 2024	2024 JGP China	11	51.41	14	98.84	13	150.25
Jan 20–26, 2025	(United States) 2025 U.S. Championships (Junior)	7	57.02	1	131.82	1	188.84
Feb 25 – Mar 2, 2025	(Hungary) 2025 World Junior Championships	23	53.93	17	111.47	18	165.40

Results in the 2025–26 season
Date	Event	SP		FS		Total	
Date	Event	P	Score	P	Score	P	Score
Aug 7–10, 2025	(United States) 2025 Cranberry Cup	1	62.21	1	131.00	1	193.21
Aug 27–30, 2025	2025 JGP Turkey	1	68.17	4	118.75	3	186.92
Oct 1–4, 2025	2025 JGP Poland	5	58.24	2	132.43	3	190.67
Mar 3–8, 2026	(Estonia) 2026 World Junior Championships	8	62.62	14	113.48	12	176.10

=== Skating for Switzerland ===
==== Junior level ====
Results in the 2022–23 season
Date	Event	SP		FS		Total	
Date	Event	P	Score	P	Score	P	Score
Sep 7–10, 2022	2022 JGP Latvia	30	32.62	18	81.01	25	113.63
Oct 5–8, 2022	2022 JGP Poland	24	44.06	21	84.21	23	128.27
Nov 24–27, 2022	(Germany) 2022 NRW Trophy	7	42.71	10	75.06	8	117.77
15–16 Dec, 2022	(Switzerland) 2023 Swiss Junior Championships	2	54.10	2	103.96	2	158.06
