= Alexa Gasparotto =

American figure skater

- Gasparotto at the 2026 Skate America

Personal information
- Born: 12 March 2003 (age 23) Michigan, United States
- Home town: Glenview, United States
- Height: 160 cm (5 ft 3 in)

Figure skating career
- Country: United States
- Coach: Jeremy Allen
- Skating club: Arctic Edge Figure Skating Club

Alexa Gasparotto (born 12 March 2003) is an American figure skater. She is the 2025 Tayside Trophy silver medalist. Additionally, she is the first black woman to land a triple Axel in international competition.

== Personal life ==
Alexa Gasparotto was born on March 12, 2003, in Michigan, United States.

== Career ==
=== Early career ===
Gasparotto was previously coached by Amber Gil, before switching to Jeremy Allen. She made her first apperance at the U.S. Figure Skating Championships in 2023, where she placed seventeenth overall. The following season, Gasparotto placed thirteenth at the 2024 U.S. Championships, before debuting internationally for the first time at the Maria Olszewska Trophy, concluding that event in eighth place. In the subsequent season, she won the silver medal at the 2025 Tayside Trophy.

=== 2026–27 season: Grand Prix debut ===
Gasparotto opened the new season at the 2026 CS Kinoshita Group Cup where she finished in ninth place overall, scoring new personal best scores.

Following Amber Glenn's withdrawal from the 2026 Skate America, Gasparotto was named as the substitute host pick. Making her Grand Prix debut, Gasparotto landed the triple Axel jump in the short program, making her the first black woman to land the jump in international competition. Gasparotto concluded the competition in eleventh place.

== Programs ==
Season	Short program	Free skating	Exhibition
2026–2027	Make You Feel My Love by Adele and Bob Dylan choreo. by Tommy Steenberg	Unchained Melodies (from "Ghost") by Maurice Jarre and Hy Zarte choreo. by Tommy Steenberg	

== Competitive highlights ==
- GP – Event of the ISU Grand Prix Series
- CS – Event of the ISU Challenger Series
- TBD – Assigned
- WD – Withdrew from competition

Competition placements at senior level
Season	2022–23	2024–25	2025–26	2026–27
U.S. Championships	17th	13th		
GP Skate America				11th
CS Kinoshita Group Cup				9th
CS Warsaw Cup				TBD
Olszewska Memorial		8th		
Tayside Trophy			2nd	

== Detailed results ==
ISU personal best scores in the +5/-5 GOE System
Segment	Type	Score	Event
Total	TSS	158.04	2026 CS Kinoshita Group Cup
Short program	TSS	56.04	2026 Skate America
Short program	TES	31.71	2026 Skate America
Short program	PCS	25.33	2026 Skate America
Free skating	TSS	102.32	2026 CS Kinoshita Group Cup
Free skating	TES	53.72	2026 CS Kinoshita Group Cup
Free skating	PCS	48.60	2026 CS Kinoshita Group Cup

=== Senior level ===
Results in the 2026–27 season
Date	Event	SP		FS		Total	
Date	Event	P	Score	P	Score	P	Score
Sep 4–6, 2026	(Japan) 2026 CS Kinoshita Group Cup	9	55.72	10	102.32	9	158.04
Nov 13–15, 2026	(United States) 2026 Skate America	12	56.04	11	96.73	11	152.77

Results in the 2025–26 season
Date	Event	SP		FS		Total	
Date	Event	P	Score	P	Score	P	Score
Oct 11–12, 2025	(United Kingdom) 2025 Tayside Trophy	6	48.09	2	100.07	2	148.16

Results in the 2024–25 season
Date	Event	SP		FS		Total	
Date	Event	P	Score	P	Score	P	Score
Jan 20–26, 2025	(United States) 2025 U.S. Championships	15	52.61	13	98.85	13	151.46
Mar 4–9, 2025	(Poland) 2025 Maria Olszewska Memorial	10	48.71	7	95.15	8	143.86

Results in the 2022–23 season
Date	Event	SP		FS		Total	
Date	Event	P	Score	P	Score	P	Score
Jan 23–29, 2026	(United States) 2023 U.S. Championships	16	45.00	17	84.41	17	129.41
