= 2026 Skate America =

Figure skating competition

- Type: Grand Prix
- Date: November 13 – 15
- Season: 2026–27
- Location: Everett, Washington, United States
- Host: U.S. Figure Skating
- Venue: Angel of the Winds Arena

Champions
- Men's singles: (United States) Ilia Malinin
- Women's singles: (Japan) Ami Nakai
- Pairs: (Germany) Minerva Fabienne Hase and Nikita Volodin
- Ice dance: (United States) Emilea Zingas and Vadym Kolesnik
- Previous: 2025 Skate America
- Next: 2027 Skate America
- Previous Grand Prix: 2026 Cup of China
- Next Grand Prix: 2026 Finlandia Trophy

The 2026 Skate America is a figure skating competition sanctioned by the International Skating Union (ISU). Organized and hosted by U.S. Figure Skating, it is the fourth event of the 2026–27 ISU Grand Prix of Figure Skating: a senior-level international invitational competition series. It was held from November 13 to 15 at the Angel of the Winds Arena in Everett, Washington, in the United States. Medals were awarded in men's singles, women's singles, pair skating, and ice dance. Skaters earned points based on their results, and the top skaters or teams in each discipline at the end of the season will be invited to then compete at the 2026–27 Grand Prix Final in Chongqing, China. Skaters earned points towards the World Standings and Season's World Ranking based on their results.

Ilia Malinin of the United States won the men's event, Ami Nakai of Japan won the women's event, Minerva Fabienne Hase and Nikita Volodin of Germany won the pairs event, and Emilea Zingas and Vadym Kolesnik of the United States won the ice dance event.

== Background ==
The ISU Grand Prix of Figure Skating is a series of seven events sanctioned by the International Skating Union (ISU) and held during the autumn: six qualifying events and the Grand Prix of Figure Skating Final. This allows skaters to perfect their programs earlier in the season, as well as compete against the skaters whom they would later encounter at the World Championships. Skaters earn points based on their results in their respective competitions and the top skaters or teams in each discipline are invited to compete at the Grand Prix Final. The first iteration of Skate America – then called the Norton Skate – was held in 1979 in Lake Placid, New York, and was the test event for the 1980 Winter Olympics. When the ISU launched the Grand Prix series in 1995, Skate America was one of the five qualifying events. It has been a Grand Prix event every year since.

The 2026 Skate America is the fourth event of the 2026–27 ISU Grand Prix of Figure Skating series, and was held from November 13 to 15 at the Angel of the Winds Arena in Everett, Washington, in the United States. The event drew 29,598 spectators and broke the Skate America attendance record that had been set by Everett in the 2008 edition.

== Entries ==
The International Skating Union published the initial list of entrants on June 16, 2026.

Country	Men	Women	Pairs	Ice dance
Australia	—N/a			Holly Harris; Jason Chan
Canada	Aleksa Rakic	Sara-Maude Dupuis	Ava Kemp; Yohnatan Elizarov	—N/a
Czech Republic	Georgii Reshtenko	—N/a		Kateřina Mrázková; Daniel Mrázek
Estonia	Aleksandr Selevko	—N/a		
France	—N/a		Aurélie Faula; Théo Belle	Natacha Lagouge; Arnaud Caffa
France	—N/a		—N/a	Evgeniia Lopareva; Geoffrey Brissaud
Germany	—N/a		Minerva Fabienne Hase; Nikita Volodin	—N/a
Israel	Tamir Kuperman	—N/a		
Italy	Daniel Grassl	—N/a		Noemi Maria Tali; Noah Lafornara
Italy	Nikolaj Memola	—N/a		—N/a
Japan	Sōta Yamamoto	Rino Matsuike	—N/a	
Japan	—N/a	Ami Nakai	—N/a	
Kazakhstan	—N/a	Sofia Samodelkina	—N/a	
Mexico	Donovan Carrillo	—N/a		
South Korea	—N/a	Kim Yu-jae	—N/a	
South Korea	—N/a	Yun Ah-sun	—N/a	
South Korea	—N/a	You Young	—N/a	
Spain	—N/a			Sofía Val; Asaf Kazimov
Switzerland	Lukas Britschgi	—N/a	Oxana Vouillamoz; Tom Bouvart	—N/a
Ukraine	—N/a		Sofiia Holichenko; Artem Darenskyi	Iryna Pidgaina; Artem Koval
United States	Jason Brown	Alexa Gasparotto	Alisa Efimova; Misha Mitrofanov	Emilea Zingas; Vadym Kolesnik
United States	Ilia Malinin	Logan Higase-Chen	Katie McBeath; Balazs Nagy	Leah Neset; Artem Markelov
United States	Daniel Martynov	Sophie Joline von Felten	Audrey Shin; Spencer Akira Howe	Katarina Wolfkostin; Dimitry Tsarevski
(Individual Neutral Athletes) Individual Neutral Athlete	—N/a	Alexandra Ignatova	—N/a	
(Individual Neutral Athletes) Individual Neutral Athlete	—N/a	Adeliia Petrosian	—N/a	

== Changes to preliminary assignments ==
Discipline	Withdrew		Added		Notes	Ref.
Discipline	Date	Skater(s)	Date	Skater(s)	Notes	Ref.
Pairs	July 31	(Netherlands); Daria Danilova; Michel Tsiba	August 6	(Ukraine); Sofiia Holichenko; Artem Darenskyi	Taking season off	
Ice dance	—N/a		August 4	(United States); Leah Neset; Artem Markelov	Host picks	
Ice dance	—N/a		August 4	(United States); Katarina Wolfkostin; Dimitry Tsarevski	Host picks	
Women	August 21	(France); Lorine Schild	August 28	(South Korea); You Young	Taking a break	
Women	August 25	(United States); Alysa Liu	September 4	(United States); Logan Higase-Chen	Taking a break	
Men	—N/a		September 4	(United States); Daniel Martynov	Host picks	
Pairs	—N/a		September 4	(United States); Katie McBeath; Balázs Nagy	Host picks	
Women	—N/a		September 10	(United States); Sophie Joline von Felten	Host pick	
Pairs	—N/a		September 15	(United States); Audrey Shin; Spencer Akira Howe	Host pick	
Ice dance	September 16	(Germany); Jennifer Janse van Rensburg; Benjamin Steffan	September 23	(Spain); Sofía Val; Asaf Kazimov		
Ice dance	September 28	(United Kingdom); Phebe Bekker; James Hernandez	October 12	(Italy); Noemi Maria Tali; Noah Lafornara		
Women	October 20	(Israel); Mariia Seniuk	October 22	(Individual Neutral Athletes); Alexandra Ignatova		
Women	October 21	(United States); Amber Glenn	October 21	(United States); Alexa Gasparotto		
Women	November 2	(Belgium); Nina Pinzarrone	November 6	(Individual Neutral Athletes); Adeliia Petrosian		

== Required performance elements ==
=== Single skating ===
Lasting no more than 2 minutes 40 seconds, the short program has to include the following elements:

For men: one double or triple Axel; one triple or quadruple jump; one jump combination consisting of a double jump and a triple jump, two triple jumps, or a quadruple jump and a double jump or triple jump; one flying spin; one camel spin or sit spin with a change of foot; one spin combination with a change of foot; and one step sequence using the full ice surface.

For women: one double or triple Axel; one triple jump; one jump combination consisting of a double jump and a triple jump, or two triple jumps; one flying spin; one layback spin, sideways leaning spin, camel spin, or sit spin without a change of foot; one spin combination with a change of foot; and one step sequence using the full ice surface.

The free skate can last no more than 4 minutes, and has to include the following: six jump elements, of which one has to be an Axel-type jump; three spins, of which one has to be a spin combination, one a flying spin, and one a choreographic spin; one step sequence; and a choreographic sequence.

=== Pair skating ===
Lasting no more than 2 minutes 40 seconds, the short program has to include the following elements: one group 3 pair lift, one double or triple twist lift, one double or triple throw jump, one double or triple solo jump, one pair spin combination, one forward inside death spiral, and one step sequence using the full ice surface.

The free skate could last no more than 4 minutes, and has to include the following: two pair lifts (from different lift groups), one twist lift, two different throw jumps, one solo jump, one jump combination or sequence, one choreographic pair lift, one choreographic pair spin, and one death spiral (different type from the one done in the short program).

=== Ice dance ===
Lasting no more than 2 minutes 50 seconds, the theme of the rhythm dance this season is "Rhythm and Waltz". The rhythm dance has to include the following elements: one section of the Golden Waltz pattern dance, one creative dance element, one dance lift, one set of sequential twizzles, and one step sequence while not touching.

The free dance can last no longer than 4 minutes, and has to include the following: three dance lifts or one short lift and one combination lift; one dance spin; one step sequence in hold; one set of synchronized twizzles, one one-foot turns sequence in hold, and two choreographic elements.

== Judging ==
Skaters are judged according to the required technical elements of their program (such as jumps and spins), as well as the overall presentation of their program, based on three program components (skating skills, presentation, and composition). Each technical element in a figure skating performance is assigned a predetermined base point value and scored by a panel of nine judges on a scale from −5 to +5 based on the quality of its execution. Each Grade of Execution (GOE) from –5 to +5 is assigned a value as indicated on the Scale of Values. For example, a triple Axel is worth a base value of 8.00 points, and a GOE of +3 is worth 2.40 points, so a triple Axel with a GOE of +3 earns 10.40 points. The judging panel's GOE for each element is determined by calculating the trimmed mean (the average after discarding the highest and lowest scores). The panel's scores for all elements are added together to generate a Total Elements Score. At the same time, the judges evaluate each performance based on the five aforementioned program components and assign each a score from 0.25 to 10 in 0.25-point increments. The judging panel's final score for each program component is also determined by calculating the trimmed mean. Those scores are then multiplied by the factor shown on the chart below; the results are added together to generate a total Program Component Score.

Program component factoring
Discipline	Short program or rhythm dance	Free skate or free dance
Men	1.67	3.33
Women	1.33	2.67
Pairs	1.33	2.67
Ice dance	1.33	2.00

Deductions are applied for certain violations, such as time infractions, stops and restarts, or falls. The Total Elements Score and Program Component Score are then added together, minus any deductions, to generate a final performance score for each skater or team.

== Medalists ==
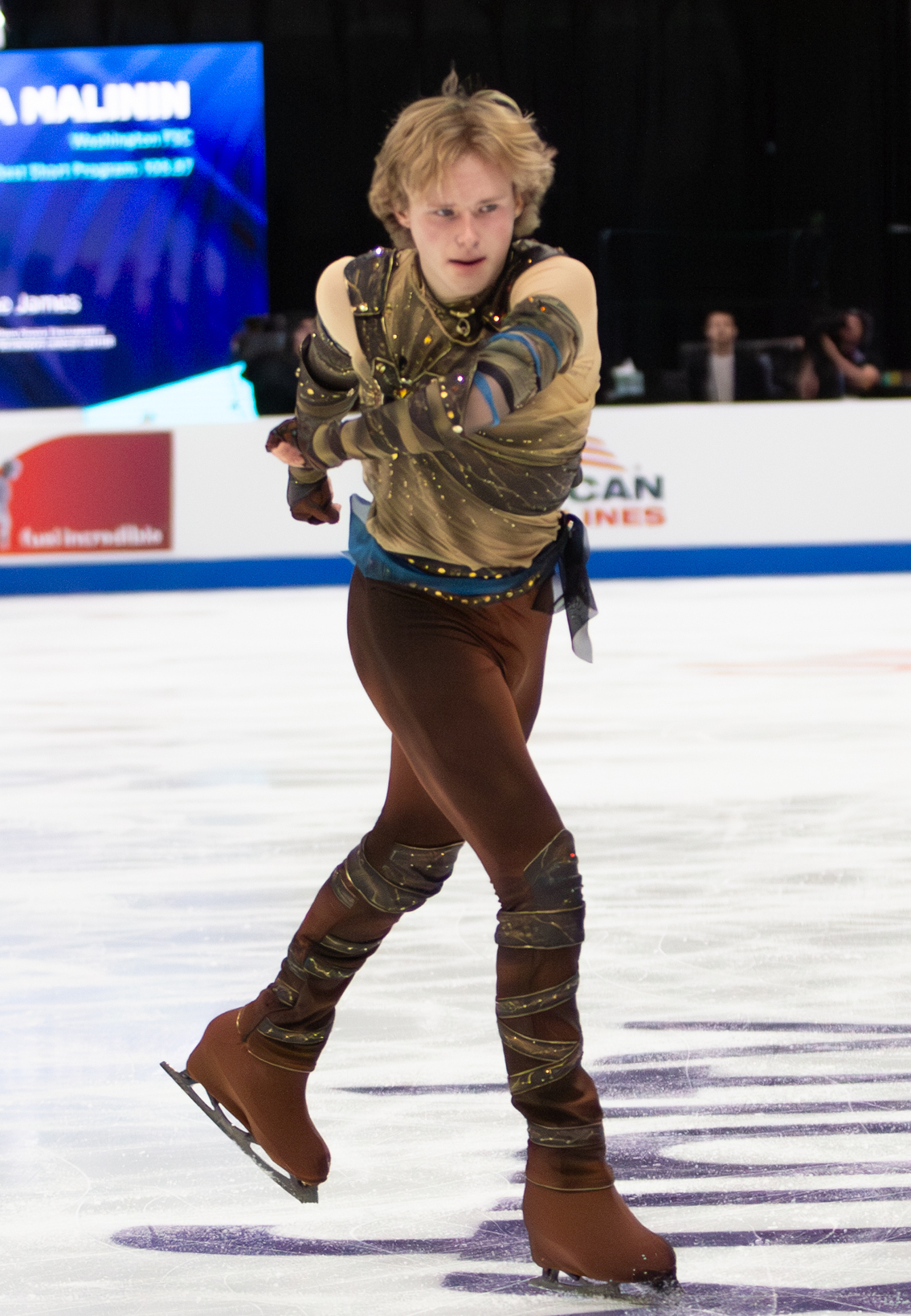
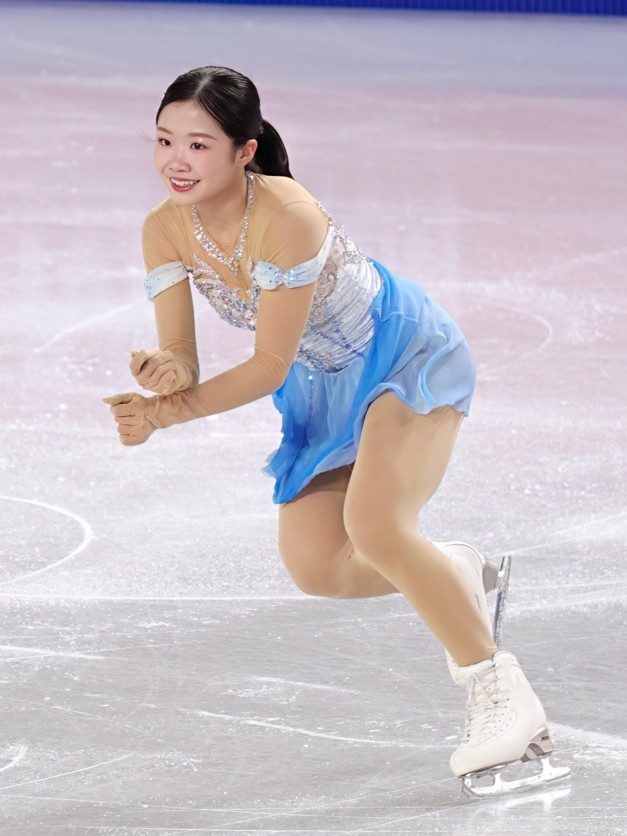
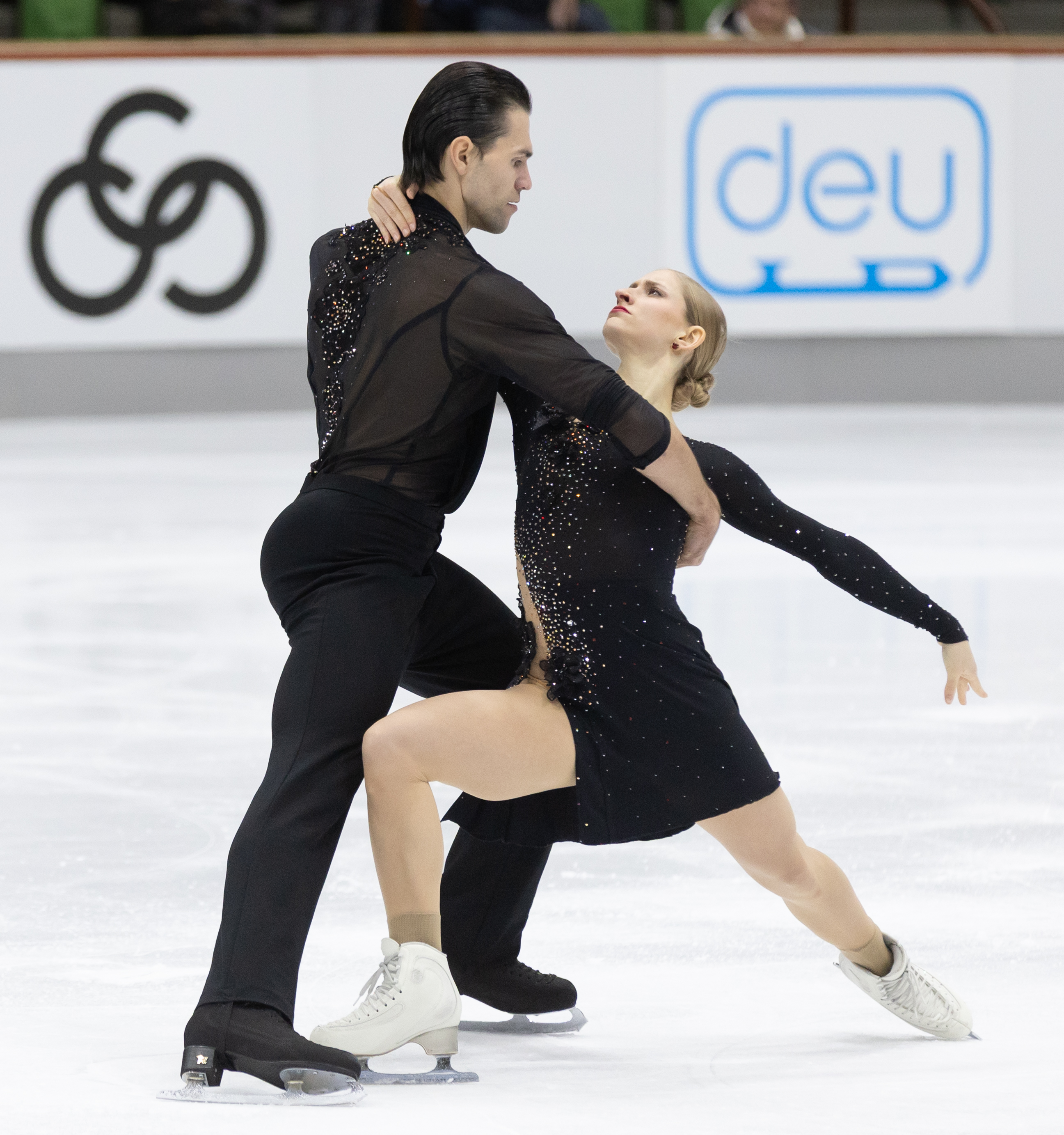
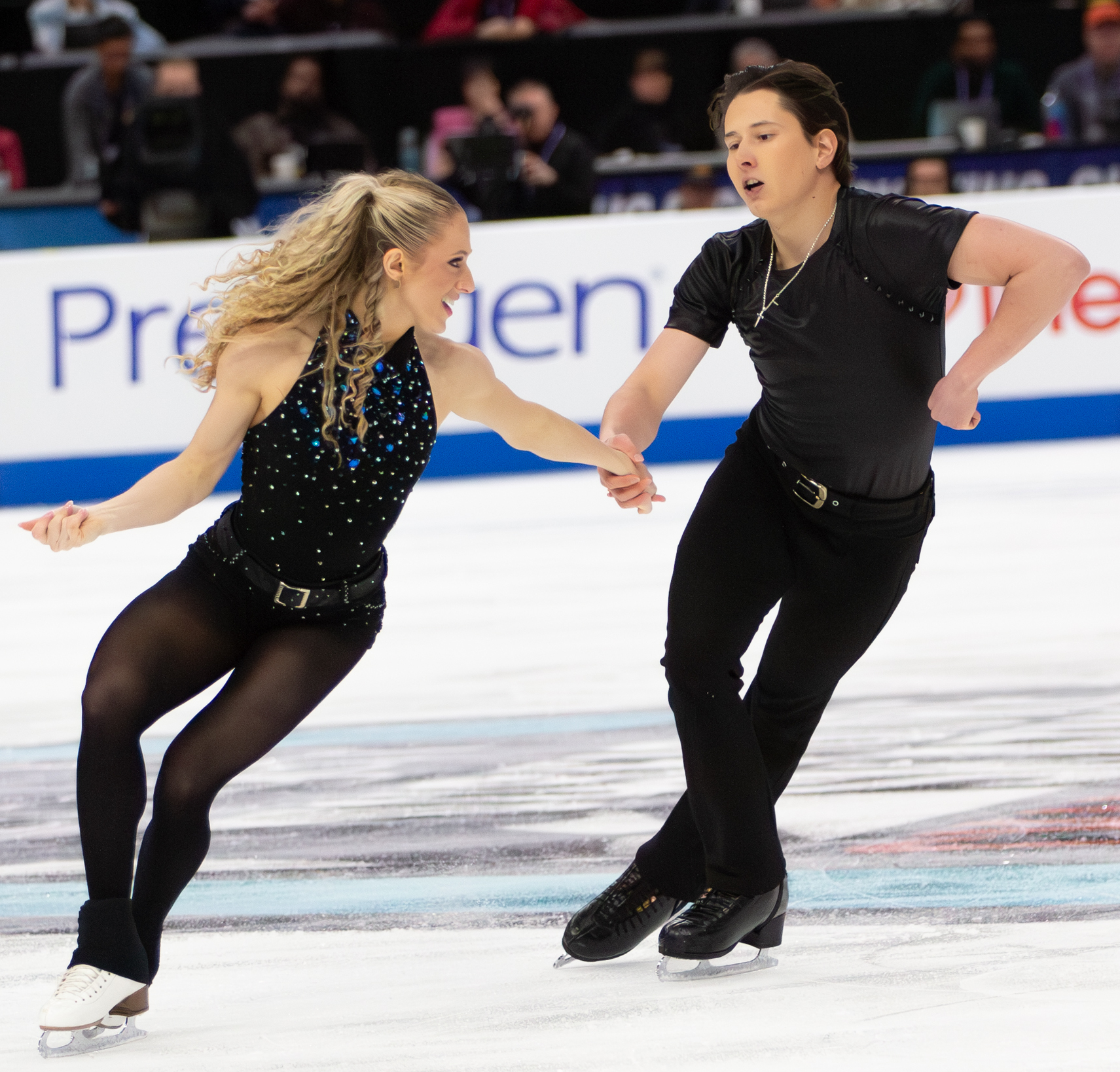
The 2026 Skate America champions (from left to right): Ilia Malinin of the United States (men's singles); Ami Nakai of Japan (women's singles); Minerva Fabienne Hase and Nikita Volodin of Germany (pair skating); and Emilea Zingas and Vadym Kolesnik of the United States (ice dance)

Medalists
Discipline	Gold	Silver	Bronze
Men	(United States); Ilia Malinin	(Italy); Daniel Grassl	(Israel); Tamir Kuperman
Women	(Japan); Ami Nakai	(Individual Neutral Athletes); Alexandra Ignatova	(Japan); Rino Matsuike
Pairs	(Germany); Minerva Fabienne Hase; Nikita Volodin	(United States); Alisa Efimova; Misha Mitrofanov	(United States); Katie McBeath; Balázs Nagy
Ice dance	(United States); Emilea Zingas; Vadym Kolesnik	(France); Evgeniia Lopareva; Geoffrey Brissaud	(Czech Republic); Kateřina Mrázková; Daniel Mrázek

== Results ==
=== Men's singles ===
Men’s results
Rank	Skater	Nation	Total points	SP		FS	
1st place, gold medalist(s)	Ilia Malinin	United States	284.31	1	96.74	2	187.57
2nd place, silver medalist(s)	Daniel Grassl	Italy	274.73	4	86.48	1	188.25
3rd place, bronze medalist(s)	Tamir Kuperman	Israel	248.55	7	83.13	3	165.42
4	Jason Brown	United States	245.73	6	84.00	4	161.73
5	Donovan Carrillo	Mexico	240.38	3	86.49	5	153.89
6	Lukas Britschgi	Switzerland	231.59	9	80.88	6	150.71
7	Sota Yamamoto	Japan	231.34	2	91.29	10	140.05
8	Aleksandr Selevko	Estonia	230.68	8	81.02	7	149.66
9	Daniel Martynov	United States	220.96	5	84.17	12	136.79
10	Aleksa Rakic	Canada	207.14	10	68.92	11	138.22
11	Georgii Reshtenko	Czech Republic	206.26	11	65.77	9	140.49
12	Nikolaj Memola	Italy	205.40	12	63.46	8	141.94

=== Women's singles ===
Women’s results
Rank	Skater	Nation	Total points	SP		FS	
1st place, gold medalist(s)	Ami Nakai	Japan	236.81	1	82.20	1	154.61
2nd place, silver medalist(s)	Alexandra Ignatova	Individual Neutral Athletes	213.90	2	74.24	3	139.66
3rd place, bronze medalist(s)	Rino Matsuike	Japan	211.63	5	70.30	2	141.33
4	Kim Yu-jae	South Korea	204.28	3	73.92	5	130.36
5	Sofia Samodelkina	Kazakhstan	198.59	11	61.03	4	137.56
6	Adeliia Petrosian	Individual Neutral Athletes	198.03	4	71.47	7	126.56
7	You Young	South Korea	193.05	8	65.60	6	127.45
8	Yun Ah-sun	South Korea	189.22	7	67.13	9	122.09
9	Sara-Maude Dupuis	Canada	188.28	6	68.95	10	119.33
10	Sophie Joline von Felten	United States	186.16	10	61.23	8	124.93
11	Alexa Gasparotto	United States	152.77	12	56.04	11	96.73
12	Logan Higase-Chen	United States	144.72	9	63.29	12	81.43

=== Pairs ===
Pairs results
Rank	Skater	Nation	Total points	SP		FS	
1st place, gold medalist(s)	Minerva Fabienne Hase; Nikita Volodin	Germany	200.79	1	72.71	1	128.08
2nd place, silver medalist(s)	Alisa Efimova; Misha Mitrofanov	United States	191.79	2	71.85	2	119.94
3rd place, bronze medalist(s)	Katie McBeath; Balázs Nagy	United States	187.13	5	67.62	3	119.51
4	Oxana Vouillamoz; Tom Bouvart	Switzerland	183.56	3	70.63	5	112.93
5	Ava Kemp; Yohnatan Elizarov	Canada	181.62	4	67.73	4	113.89
6	Audrey Shin; Spencer Akira Howe	United States	171.18	6	64.86	6	106.32
7	Sofiia Holichenko; Artem Darenskyi	Ukraine	157.78	7	58.54	7	99.24
8	Aurélie Faula; Théo Belle	France	152.23	8	54.91	8	97.32

=== Ice dance ===
Ice dance results
Rank	Skater	Nation	Total points	RD		FD	
1st place, gold medalist(s)	Emilea Zingas; Vadym Kolesnik	United States	201.88	1	82.52	1	119.36
2nd place, silver medalist(s)	Evgeniia Lopareva; Geoffrey Brissaud	France	195.28	2	79.94	2	115.34
3rd place, bronze medalist(s)	Kateřina Mrázková; Daniel Mrázek	Czech Republic	190.88	3	76.32	3	114.56
4	Katarina Wolfkostin; Dimitry Tsarevski	United States	177.03	5	69.62	4	107.41
5	Leah Neset; Artem Markelov	United States	175.64	6	69.10	5	106.54
6	Holly Harris; Jason Chan	Australia	173.02	4	71.20	6	101.82
7	Sofía Val; Asaf Kazimov	Spain	163.91	8	65.79	7	98.12
8	Noemi Maria Tali; Noah Lafornara	Italy	162.68	7	67.84	8	94.84
9	Iryna Pidgaina; Artem Koval	Ukraine	159.31	9	64.78	9	94.53
10	Natacha Lagouge; Arnaud Caffa	France	148.15	10	59.92	10	88.23

== Works cited ==
- "Sports Rules – Single & Pair Skating and Ice Dance" (PDF). International Skating Union. Archived (PDF) from the original on May 24, 2026.
