= 2026–27 ISU Grand Prix of Figure Skating =

Figure skating competition series

- Type: Grand Prix
- Date: October 23 – December 12, 2026
- Season: 2026–27
- Previous: 2025–26 Grand Prix
- Next: 2027–28 Grand Prix

The 2026–27 Grand Prix of Figure Skating is a series of senior international competitions organized by the International Skating Union that will be held from October 2026 to December 2026. Medals will be awarded in men's singles, women's singles, pair skating, and ice dance. Skaters earn points based on their placements at each event and the top six in each discipline then qualify to compete at the Grand Prix Final in Chongqing, China. The corresponding series for junior-level skaters is the 2026–27 ISU Junior Grand Prix.

== Competitions ==
This series included the following events.

2026–27 Grand Prix competitions
Date	Event	Location	Ref.
October 23–25	2026 Grand Prix de France	Angers, France	
October 30 – November 1	2026 Skate Canada International	Kelowna, British Columbia, Canada	
November 6–8	2026 Cup of China	Shenzhen, China	
November 13–15	(United States) 2026 Skate America	Everett, Washington, United States	
November 20–22	(Finland) 2026 Finlandia Trophy	Helsinki, Finland	
November 27–29	(Japan) 2026 NHK Trophy	Tokyo, Japan	
December 10–12	(China) 2026–27 Grand Prix Final	Chongqing, China	

== Assignments ==
The International Skating Union announced the preliminary assignments on June 16, 2026.

=== Men's singles ===
Men's assignments
Nation	Skater	Assignment(s)	
Canada	Stephen Gogolev	Skate Canada International	Finlandia Trophy
China	Chen Yudong	Cup of China	Finlandia Trophy
Czech Republic	Georgii Reshtenko	Skate Canada International	Skate America
Estonia	Aleksandr Selevko	Grand Prix de France	Skate America
Estonia	Mihhail Selevko	Skate Canada International	Finlandia Trophy
France	Kévin Aymoz	Skate Canada International	NHK Trophy
France	Francois Pitot	Grand Prix de France	NHK Trophy
France	Adam Siao Him Fa	Grand Prix de France	Finlandia Trophy
Georgia	Nika Egadze	Cup of China	Finlandia Trophy
Germany	Genrikh Gartung	Skate Canada International	Finlandia Trophy
Individual Neutral Athletes	Vladislav Dikidzhi	Cup of China	NHK Trophy
Israel	Tamir Kuperman	Skate America	Finlandia Trophy
Italy	Daniel Grassl	Skate America	NHK Trophy
Italy	Nikolaj Memola	Grand Prix de France	Skate America
Japan	Kao Miura	Grand Prix de France	Cup of China
Japan	Rio Nakata	Skate Canada International	NHK Trophy
Japan	Shun Sato	Cup of China	NHK Trophy
Japan	Kazuki Tomono	Skate Canada International	Finlandia Trophy
Japan	Sōta Yamamoto	Grand Prix de France	Skate America
Kazakhstan	Mikhail Shaidorov	Grand Prix de France	Cup of China
Poland	Vladimir Samoilov	Cup of China	NHK Trophy
South Korea	Seo Min-kyu	Grand Prix de France	Cup of China
Switzerland	Lukas Britschgi	Skate America	NHK Trophy
Ukraine	Kyrylo Marsak	Skate Canada International	Finlandia Trophy
United States	Jason Brown	Skate America	NHK Trophy
United States	Ilia Malinin	Skate America	NHK Trophy
United States	Jacob Sanchez	Grand Prix de France	Cup of China
Canada	David Bondar	Skate Canada International	
Canada	Wesley Chiu	Skate Canada International	
Canada	Aleksa Rakic	Skate America	
China	Peng Zhiming	Cup of China	
Estonia	Arlet Levandi	Finlandia Trophy	
Finland	Matias Lindfors	Finlandia Trophy	
France	Samy Hammi	Grand Prix de France	
Individual Neutral Athletes	Petr Gumennik	NHK Trophy	
Individual Neutral Athletes	Evgeni Semenenko	Cup of China	
Japan	Nozomu Yoshioka	NHK Trophy	
South Korea	Kim Hyun-gyeom	Skate Canada International	
Mexico	Donovan Carrillo	Skate America	
Slovakia	Adam Hagara	Grand Prix de France	
Sweden	Andreas Nordeback	Finlandia Trophy	
United States	Liam Kapeikis	Skate Canada International	
United States	Lucius Kazanecki	Cup of China	
United States	Jimmy Ma	Grand Prix de France	
United States	Daniel Martynov	Skate America	

=== Women's singles ===
Women's assignments
Nation	Skater	Assignment(s)	
Canada	Sara-Maude Dupuis	Skate Canada International	Skate America
Canada	Madeline Schizas	Skate Canada International	NHK Trophy
Estonia	Niina Petrokina	Skate Canada International	Finlandia Trophy
Georgia	Anastasiia Gubanova	Grand Prix de France	Cup of China
Individual Neutral Athletes	Alexandra Ignatova	Cup of China	Skate America
Individual Neutral Athletes	Adeliia Petrosian	Skate America	NHK Trophy
Individual Neutral Athletes	Viktoriia Safonova	Skate Canada International	NHK Trophy
Italy	Lara Naki Gutmann	Grand Prix de France	Cup of China
Italy	Anna Pezzetta	Skate Canada International	Finlandia Trophy
Japan	Yuna Aoki	Grand Prix de France	NHK Trophy
Japan	Mone Chiba	Cup of China	NHK Trophy
Japan	Ami Nakai	Grand Prix de France	Skate America
Japan	Mao Shimada	Skate Canada International	Finlandia Trophy
Japan	Rion Sumiyoshi	Grand Prix de France	Finlandia Trophy
Japan	Rinka Watanabe	Cup of China	Finlandia Trophy
Japan	Mako Yamashita	Cup of China	NHK Trophy
Kazakhstan	Sofia Samodelkina	Skate Canada International	Skate America
South Korea	Kim Yu-jae	Skate Canada International	Skate America
South Korea	Kim Yu-seong	Grand Prix de France	Finlandia Trophy
South Korea	Lee Hae-in	Cup of China	Finlandia Trophy
South Korea	Shin Ji-a	Skate Canada International	NHK Trophy
South Korea	You Young	Skate America	NHK Trophy
United States	Sarah Everhardt	Grand Prix de France	NHK Trophy
United States	Isabeau Levito	Skate Canada International	Finlandia Trophy
United States	Sophie Joline von Felten	Cup of China	Skate America
Austria	Olga Mikutina	Cup of China	
Belgium	Nina Pinzarrone	Grand Prix de France	
Canada	Gabrielle Daleman	Grand Prix de France	
Canada	Fee Ann Landry	Skate Canada International	
China	Zhang Ruiyang	Cup of China	
China	Zhu Yi	Cup of China	
Finland	Janna Jyrkinen	Finlandia Trophy	
Finland	Iida Karhunen	Finlandia Trophy	
Finland	Minja Peltonen	Finlandia Trophy	
France	Ève Dubecq	Grand Prix de France	
Individual Neutral Athletes	Alina Gorbacheva	NHK Trophy	
Italy	Sarina Joos	Grand Prix de France	
Japan	Rino Matsuike	Skate America	
Japan	Saki Miyake	Skate Canada International	
South Korea	Kim Seo-young	Finlandia Trophy	
South Korea	Youn Seo-jin	Grand Prix de France	
South Korea	Yun Ah-sun	Skate America	
Romania	Julia Sauter	NHK Trophy	
Switzerland	Kimmy Repond	NHK Trophy	
United States	Alina Bonillo	Cup of China	
United States	Alexa Gasparotto	Skate America	
United States	Logan Higase-Chen	Skate America	

=== Pairs ===
Pairs' assignments
Nation	Team	Assignment(s)	
Armenia	Karina Akopova; Nikita Rakhmanin	Cup of China	NHK Trophy
Canada	Jazmine Desrochers; Kieran Thrasher	Cup of China	NHK Trophy
Canada	Ava Kemp; Yohnatan Elizarov	Skate Canada International	Skate America
Canada	Lia Pereira; Trennt Michaud	Skate Canada International	Finlandia Trophy
China	Zhang Jiaxuan; Huang Yihang	Grand Prix de France	Cup of China
Czech Republic	Anna Valesi; Martin Bidař	Skate Canada International	NHK Trophy
France	Aurelie Faula; Theo Belle	Grand Prix de France	Skate America
France	Camille Kovalev; Pavel Kovalev	Grand Prix de France	NHK Trophy
France	Megan Wessenberg; Denys Strekalin	Grand Prix de France	Finlandia Trophy
Georgia	Anastasiia Metelkina; Luka Berulava	Grand Prix de France	Cup of China
Germany	Minerva Fabienne Hase; Nikita Volodin	Skate America	NHK Trophy
Germany	Annika Hocke; Robert Kunkel	Grand Prix de France	Finlandia Trophy
Italy	Irma Caldara; Riccardo Maglio	Skate Canada International	Finlandia Trophy
Japan	Yuna Nagaoka; Sumitada Moriguchi	Cup of China	NHK Trophy
Switzerland	Oxana Vouillamoz; Tom Bouvart	Skate Canada International	Skate America
Ukraine	Hannah Herrera; Ivan Khobta	Grand Prix de France	Finlandia Trophy
Ukraine	Sofiia Holichenko; Artem Darenskyi	Skate Canada International	Skate America
United States	Alisa Efimova; Misha Mitrofanov	Skate Canada International	Skate America
United States	Chelsea Liu; Ryan Bedard	Cup of China	NHK Trophy
United States	Katie McBeath; Balázs Nagy	Skate America	Finlandia Trophy
United States	Valentina Plazas; Maximiliano Fernandez	Cup of China	Finlandia Trophy
United States	Audrey Shin; Spencer Howe	Skate America	Finlandia Trophy
Canada	Miyu Yunoki; Tristan Taylor	Skate Canada International	
Individual Neutral Athletes	Aleksandra Boikova; Dmitrii Kozlovskii	Grand Prix de France	
Individual Neutral Athletes	Anastasia Mishina; Aleksandr Galliamov	Cup of China	
United States	Naomi Williams; Lachlan Lewer	NHK Trophy	

=== Ice dance ===
Ice dance assignments
Nation	Team	Assignment(s)	
Australia	Holly Harris; Jason Chan	Grand Prix de France	Skate America
Canada	Marjorie Lajoie; Jean-Luc Baker	Finlandia Trophy	NHK Trophy
Canada	Marie-Jade Lauriault; Romain Le Gac	Skate Canada International	Finlandia Trophy
Czech Republic	Natálie Taschlerová; Filip Taschler	Cup of China	Finlandia Trophy
Finland	Yuka Orihara; Juho Pirinen	Finlandia Trophy	NHK Trophy
Finland	Juulia Turkkila; Matthias Versluis	Finlandia Trophy	NHK Trophy
France	Loïcia Demougeot; Théo le Mercier	Cup of China	NHK Trophy
France	Laurence Fournier Beaudry; Guillaume Cizeron	Grand Prix de France	Finlandia Trophy
France	Evgenia Lopareva; Geoffrey Brissaud	Skate Canada International	Skate America
Georgia	Diana Davis; Gleb Smolkin	Grand Prix de France	Cup of China
Great Britain	Lilah Fear; Lewis Gibson	Skate Canada International	Cup of China
Italy	Noemi Maria Tali; Noah Lafornara	Skate Canada International	Skate America
Spain	Olivia Smart; Tim Dieck	Cup of China	NHK Trophy
Spain	Sofía Val; Asaf Kazimov	Grand Prix de France	Skate America
Sweden	Milla Ruud Reitan; Nikolaj Majorov	Grand Prix de France	Finlandia Trophy
Ukraine	Iryna Pidgaina; Artem Koval	Skate Canada International	Skate America
United States	Emily Bratti; Ian Somerville	Cup of China	Finlandia Trophy
United States	Oona Brown; Gage Brown	Skate Canada International	Finlandia Trophy
United States	Christina Carreira; Anthony Ponomarenko	Grand Prix de France	NHK Trophy
United States	Caroline Green; Michael Parsons	Skate Canada International	Finlandia Trophy
United States	Leah Neset; Artem Markelov	Grand Prix de France	Skate America
United States	Eva Pate; Logan Bye	Grand Prix de France	Cup of China
United States	Katarina Wolfkostin; Dimitry Tsarevski	Skate Canada International	Skate America
United States	Emilea Zingas; Vadym Kolesnik	Skate America	NHK Trophy
Canada	Alyssa Robinson; Jacob Portz	Skate Canada International	
Canada	Layla Veillon; Alexander Brandys	Skate Canada International	
China	Lin Yufei; Gao Zijian	Cup of China	
China	Ren Junfei; Xing Jianing	Cup of China	
China	Xiao Zixi; He Linghao	Cup of China	
Czech Republic	Kateřina Mrázková; Daniel Mrázek	Skate America	
France	Louise Bordet; Martin Chardain	Grand Prix de France	
France	Célina Fradji; Jean-Hans Fourneaux	Grand Prix de France	
France	Natacha Lagouge; Arnaud Caffa	Skate America	
Japan	Rika Kihira; Shingo Nishiyama	NHK Trophy	
Japan	Ikura Kushida; Koshiro Shimada	NHK Trophy	
Japan	Utana Yoshida; Masaya Morita	NHK Trophy	

=== Changes to preliminary assignments ===
==== Grand Prix de France ====
Changes to preliminary assignments (Grand Prix de France)
Discipline	Withdrew		Added		Notes	Ref.
Discipline	Date	Skater(s)	Date	Skater(s)	Notes	Ref.
Men	—N/a		August 4	(France); Francois Pitot	Host pick	
Ice dance	September 8	(Lithuania); Allison Reed; Saulius Ambrulevičius	September 16	(Sweden); Milla Ruud Reitan; Nikolaj Majorov	Taking time off	
Ice dance	September 10	(Germany); Jennifer Janse van Rensburg; Benjamin Steffan	September 22	(Australia); Holly Harris; Jason Chan		
Pairs	October 2	(Hungary); Maria Pavlova; Alexei Sviatchenko	October 5	(Individual Neutral Athletes); Aleksandra Boikova; Dmitrii Kozlovskii	Sviatchenko needed surgery.	

==== Skate Canada International ====
Changes to preliminary assignments (Skate Canada International)
Discipline	Withdrew		Added		Notes	Ref.
Discipline	Date	Skater(s)	Date	Skater(s)	Notes	Ref.
Men	September 2	(Italy); Matteo Rizzo	September 9	(Czech Republic); Georgii Reshtenko	Not competing in Grand Prix series	
Men	—N/a		September 15	(Canada); David Bondar	Host picks	
Women	—N/a		September 15	(Canada); Sara-Maude Dupuis	Host picks	
Pairs	—N/a		September 15	(Canada); Miyu Yunoki; Tristan Taylor	Host picks	
Ice dance	—N/a		September 15	(Canada); Alyssa Robinson; Jacob Portz	Host picks	
Men	October 21	(United States); Andrew Torgashev	October 22	(Germany); Genrikh Gartung		
Women	October 21	(Finland); Iida Karhunen	October 22	(Individual Neutral Athletes); Viktoriia Safonova		
Ice dance	October 26	(Czech Republic); Kateřina Mrázková; Daniel Mrázek	October 26	(Italy); Noemi Maria Tali; Noah Lafornara	Injury (Mrázková)	

==== Cup of China ====
Changes to preliminary assignments (Cup of China)
Discipline	Withdrew		Added		Notes	Ref.
Discipline	Date	Skater(s)	Date	Skater(s)	Notes	Ref.
Men	August 17	(Latvia); Deniss Vasiljevs	September 2	(Poland); Vladimir Samoilov	Taking season off	
Men	—N/a		September 4	(China); Peng Zhiming	Host Picks	
Women	—N/a		September 4	(China); Zhu Yi	Host Picks	
Ice dance	—N/a		September 4	(China); Lin Yufei; Gao Zijian	Host Picks	
Men	—N/a		September 9	(Individual Neutral Athletes); Vladislav Dikidzhi	CSA forfeited host pick	
Men	October 12	(South Korea); Cha Jun-hwan	October 15	(Individual Neutral Athletes); Evgeni Semenenko	Taking season off	
Women	October 14	(South Korea); Kim Chae-yeon	October 15	(Individual Neutral Athletes); Alexandra Ignatova	Injury	
Pairs	October 21	(Austria); Gabriella Izzo; Luc Maierhofer	October 22	(Individual Neutral Athletes); Anastasia Mishina; Aleksandr Galliamov		

==== Skate America ====
Changes to preliminary assignments (Skate America)
Discipline	Withdrew		Added		Notes	Ref.
Discipline	Date	Skater(s)	Date	Skater(s)	Notes	Ref.
Pairs	July 31	(Netherlands); Daria Danilova; Michel Tsiba	August 4	(Ukraine); Sofiia Holichenko; Artem Darenskyi	Taking season off	
Ice dance	—N/a		August 4	(United States); Leah Neset; Artem Markelov	Host picks	
Ice dance	—N/a		August 4	(United States); Katarina Wolfkostin; Dimitry Tsarevski	Host picks	
Women	August 21	(France); Lorine Schild	August 28	(South Korea); You Young	Taking a break	
Women	August 25	(United States); Alysa Liu	—N/a		Taking a break	
Women	—N/a		September 4	(United States); Logan Higase-Chen	Host picks	
Men	—N/a		September 4	(United States); Daniel Martynov	Host picks	
Pairs	—N/a		September 4	(United States); Katie McBeath; Balazs Nagy	Host picks	
Women	—N/a		September 10	(United States); Sophie Joline von Felten	Host picks	
Pairs	—N/a		September 15	(United States); Audrey Shin; Spencer Akira Howe	Host picks	
Ice dance	September 16	(Germany); Jennifer Janse van Rensburg; Benjamin Steffan	September 22	(Spain); Sofía Val; Asaf Kazimov		
Ice dance	September 28	(United Kingdom); Phebe Bekker; James Hernandez	October 12	(Italy); Noemi Maria Tali; Noah Lafornara	Hernandez injured.	
Women	October 20	(Israel); Mariia Seniuk	October 22	(Individual Neutral Athletes); Alexandra Ignatova		
Women	October 21	(United States); Amber Glenn	October 21	(United States); Alexa Gasparotto		
Women	November 2	(Belgium); Nina Pinzarrone	November 6	(Individual Neutral Athletes); Adeliia Petrosian		

==== Finlandia Trophy ====
Changes to preliminary assignments (Finlandia Trophy)
Discipline	Withdrew		Added		Notes	Ref.
Discipline	Date	Skater(s)	Date	Skater(s)	Notes	Ref.
Pairs	July 31	(Austria); Sophia Schaller; Livio Mayr	August 4	(Italy); Irma Caldara; Riccardo Maglio	Schaller/Mayr retired.	
Women	—N/a		August 4	(Finland); Iida Karhunen	Host pick	
Women	August 25	(United States); Alysa Liu	September 1	(South Korea); Kim Yu-seong	Taking season off	
Men	September 2	(Italy); Matteo Rizzo	September 4	(China); Chen Yudong	Not competing in Grand Prix series	
Ice dance	September 8	(Lithuania); Allison Reed; Saulius Ambrulevičius	September 10	(Canada); Marjorie Lajoie; Jean-Luc Baker	Taking time off	
Pairs	September 11	(France); Louise Ehrhard; Matthis Pellegris	September 14	(Individual Neutral Athletes); Aleksandra Boikova; Dmitrii Kozlovskii	Split	
Men	—N/a		September 15	(Finland); Matias Lindfors	Host picks	
Women	—N/a		September 15	(Finland); Janna Jyrkinen	Host picks	
Pairs	October 2	(Hungary); Maria Pavlova; Alexei Sviatchenko	October 5	(Individual Neutral Athletes); Ekaterina Chikmareva; Matvei Ianchenkov	Sviatchenko needed surgery.	
Men	October 21	(United States); Andrew Torgashev	October 22	(Individual Neutral Athletes); Evgeni Semenenko		
Pairs	October 28	(Austria); Gabriella Izzo; Luc Maierhofer	October 29	(Individual Neutral Athletes); Anastasia Mishina; Aleksandr Galliamov		
Women	November 5	(Finland); Olivia Lisko	November 5	(Finland); Minja Peltonen		
Pairs	November 17	(Individual Neutral Athletes); Anastasia Mishina; Aleksandr Galliamov	November 18	(United States); Katie McBeath; Balázs Nagy	Visa issues	
Pairs	November 17	(Individual Neutral Athletes); Ekaterina Chikmareva; Matvei Ianchenkov	November 18	(United States); Audrey Shin; Spencer Howe	Visa issues	
Pairs	November 17	(Individual Neutral Athletes); Aleksandra Boikova; Dmitrii Kozlovskii	November 18	(France); Megan Wessenberg; Denys Strekalin	Visa issues	
Men	November 17	(Individual Neutral Athletes); Evgeni Semenenko	November 18	(Israel) Tamir Kuperman	Visa issues	

==== NHK Trophy ====
Changes to preliminary assignments (NHK Trophy)
Discipline	Withdrew		Added		Notes	Ref.
Discipline	Date	Skater(s)	Date	Skater(s)	Notes	Ref.
Pairs	July 31	(Netherlands); Daria Danilova; Michel Tsiba	August 12	(United States); Chelsea Liu; Ryan Bedard	Taking season off	
Women	August 21	(France); Lorine Schild	August 31	(Finland); Olivia Lisko	Taking a break	
Women	—N/a		September 16	(Japan); Mako Yamashita	Host picks	
Men	—N/a		September 16	(Japan); Nozomu Yoshioka	Host picks	
Ice dance	—N/a		September 16	(Japan); Rika Kihira; Shingo Nishiyama	Host picks	
Ice dance	—N/a		September 16	(Japan); Ikura Kushida; Koshiro Shimada	Host picks	
Men	October 12	(South Korea); Cha Jun-hwan	October 14	(Individual Neutral Athletes); Vladislav Dikidzhi	Taking season off	
Women	October 22	(South Korea); Kim Chae-yeon	October 22	(Individual Neutral Athletes); Adeliia Petrosian		
Women	November 5	(Finland); Olivia Lisko	November 6	(Individual Neutral Athletes); Alina Gorbacheva		
Women	November 10	(United States); Amber Glenn	November 11	(Individual Neutral Athletes); Viktoriia Safonova		
Men	November 12	(Slovakia); Adam Hagara	November 13	(Individual Neutral Athletes); Petr Gumennik		

== Medal summary ==
Medalists
Event	Discipline	Gold	Silver	Bronze
Grand Prix de France	Men	(France) Adam Siao Him Fa	(Japan) Kao Miura	(South Korea) Seo Min-kyu
Grand Prix de France	Women	(Japan) Ami Nakai	(Georgia (country)) Anastasiia Gubanova	(Italy) Lara Naki Gutmann
Grand Prix de France	Pairs	(Georgia (country)); Anastasiia Metelkina; Luka Berulava	(Individual Neutral Athletes); Aleksandra Boikova; Dmitrii Kozlovskii	(Germany); Annika Hocke; Robert Kunkel
Grand Prix de France	Ice dance	(France); Laurence Fournier Beaudry; Guillaume Cizeron	(Georgia (country)); Diana Davis; Gleb Smolkin	(United States); Christina Carreira; Anthony Ponomarenko

Medalists
Event	Discipline	Gold	Silver	Bronze
Skate Canada International	Men	(France) Kévin Aymoz	(Japan) Rio Nakata	(Estonia) Mihhail Selevko
Skate Canada International	Women	(Japan) Mao Shimada	(Estonia) Niina Petrõkina	(United States) Isabeau Levito
Skate Canada International	Pairs	(Canada); Lia Pereira; Trennt Michaud	(United States); Alisa Efimova; Misha Mitrofanov	(Switzerland); Oxana Vouillamoz; Tom Bouvart
Skate Canada International	Ice dance	(United Kingdom); Lilah Fear; Lewis Gibson	(France); Evgeniia Lopareva; Geoffrey Brissaud	(United States); Caroline Green; Michael Parsons

Medalists
Event	Discipline	Gold	Silver	Bronze
Cup of China	Men	(Japan); Kao Miura	(Individual Neutral Athletes); Vladislav Dikidzhi	(Individual Neutral Athletes); Evgeni Semenenko
Cup of China	Women	(Japan); Mone Chiba	(Individual Neutral Athletes); Alexandra Ignatova	(South Korea) Haein Lee
Cup of China	Pairs	(Individual Neutral Athletes); Anastasia Mishina; Aleksandr Galliamov	(Georgia (country)); Anastasiia Metelkina; Luka Berulava	(Japan); Yuna Nagaoka; Sumitada Moriguchi
Cup of China	Ice dance	(United Kingdom); Lilah Fear; Lewis Gibson	(Georgia (country)); Diana Davis; Gleb Smolkin	(Spain); Olivia Smart; Tim Dieck

Medalists
Event	Discipline	Gold	Silver	Bronze
(United States) Skate America	Men	(United States); Ilia Malinin	(Italy); Daniel Grassl	(Israel); Tamir Kuperman
(United States) Skate America	Women	(Japan); Ami Nakai	(Individual Neutral Athletes); Alexandra Ignatova	(Japan); Rino Matsuike
(United States) Skate America	Pairs	(Germany); Minerva Fabienne Hase; Nikita Volodin	(United States); Alisa Efimova; Misha Mitrofanov	(United States); Katie McBeath; Balázs Nagy
(United States) Skate America	Ice dance	(United States); Emilea Zingas; Vadym Kolesnik	(France); Evgeniia Lopareva; Geoffrey Brissaud	(Czech Republic); Kateřina Mrázková; Daniel Mrázek

Medalists
Event	Discipline	Gold	Silver	Bronze
(Finland) Finlandia Trophy	Men	(Estonia) Mihhail Selevko	(Sweden) Andreas Nordeback	(Japan) Kazuki Tomono
(Finland) Finlandia Trophy	Women	(Japan) Mao Shimada	(Estonia) Niina Petrõkina	(United States) Isabeau Levito
(Finland) Finlandia Trophy	Pairs	(Germany); Annika Hocke; Robert Kunkel	(Canada); Lia Pereira; Trennt Michaud	(United States); Audrey Shin; Spencer Howe
(Finland) Finlandia Trophy	Ice dance	(France); Laurence Fournier Beaudry; Guillaume Cizeron	(Finland); Juulia Turkkila; Matthias Versluis	(United States); Oona Brown; Gage Brown

Medalists
Event	Discipline	Gold	Silver	Bronze
(Japan) NHK Trophy	Men			
(Japan) NHK Trophy	Women			
(Japan) NHK Trophy	Pairs			
(Japan) NHK Trophy	Ice dance			

=== Medal standings ===
Total medals earned at the 2026–27 Grand Prix series
Rank	Nation	Gold	Silver	Bronze	Total
1	Japan	6	2	3	11
2	France	4	2	0	6
3	United States	2	2	7	11
4	Germany	2	0	1	3
5	Great Britain	2	0	0	2
6	Individual Neutral Athletes	1	4	1	6
7	Georgia	1	4	0	5
8	Estonia	1	2	1	4
9	Canada	1	1	0	2
10	Italy	0	1	1	2
11	Finland	0	1	0	1
11	Sweden	0	1	0	1
13	South Korea	0	0	2	2
14	Czech Republic	0	0	1	1
14	Israel	0	0	1	1
14	Spain	0	0	1	1
14	Switzerland	0	0	1	1
Totals (17 entries)		20	20	20	60

== Qualification ==
At each event, skaters earn points toward qualifying for the Grand Prix Final. Following the sixth event, the top six highest-scoring skaters/teams advance to the Final. The points earned per placement are as follows:

Placement	Singles	Pairs/Ice dance
1st	15	15
2nd	13	13
3rd	11	11
4th	9	9
5th	7	7
6th	5	5
7th	4	—N/a
8th	3	—N/a

There were originally seven tie-breakers in cases of a tie in overall points:

1. Highest placement at an event. If a skater placed 1st and 3rd, the tiebreaker is the 1st place, and that beats a skater who placed 2nd in both events.
2. Highest combined total scores in both events. If a skater earned 200 points at one event and 250 at a second, that skater would win in the second tie-break over a skater who earned 200 points at one event and 150 at another.
3. Participated in two events.
4. Highest combined scores in the free skating/free dance portion of both events.
5. Highest individual score in the free skating/free dance portion from one event.
6. Highest combined scores in the short program/short dance of both events.
7. Highest number of total participants at the events.

If a tie remained, it was considered unbreakable, and the tied skaters all advanced to the Grand Prix Final.

=== Qualification standings ===
Pts.	Men	Women	Pairs	Ice dance
30		(Japan); Mao Shimada		(France); Laurence Fournier Beaudry; Guillaume Cizeron
30		(Japan); Ami Nakai		(United Kingdom); Lilah Fear; Lewis Gibson
28	(Japan); Kao Miura		(Georgia (country)); Anastasiia Metelkina; Luka Berulava	
28	(Japan); Kao Miura		(Canada); Lia Pereira; Trennt Michaud	
26	(Estonia); Mihhail Selevko	(Individual Neutral Athletes); Alexandra Ignatova	(Germany); Annika Hocke; Robert Kunkel	(France); Evgeniia Lopareva; Geoffrey Brissaud
26	(Estonia); Mihhail Selevko	(Estonia); Niina Petrõkina	(United States); Alisa Efimova; Misha Mitrofanov	(Georgia (country)); Diana Davis; Gleb Smolkin
24	(France); Adam Siao Him Fa			
22		(Georgia (country)); Anastasiia Gubanova		
22		(United States); Isabeau Levito		
20			(United States); Katie McBeath; Balázs Nagy	(United States); Oona Brown; Gage Brown
20			(Switzerland); Oxana Vouillamoz; Tom Bouvart	(United States); Caroline Green; Michael Parsons
18		(Italy); Lara Naki Gutmann		
18		(South Korea); Lee Hae-in		
16	(Japan); Kazuki Tomono	(South Korea); Kim Yu-seong	(United States); Audrey Shin; Spencer Akira Howe	
16	(Japan); Kazuki Tomono	(South Korea); Kim Yu-seong	(France); Megan Wessenberg; Denys Strekalin	
15	(United States); Ilia Malinin	(Japan); Mone Chiba	(Individual Neutral Athletes); Anastasia Mishina; Aleksandr Galliamov	(United States); Emilea Zingas; Vadym Kolesnik
15	(France); Kévin Aymoz	(Japan); Mone Chiba	(Germany); Minerva Fabienne Hase; Nikita Volodin	(United States); Emilea Zingas; Vadym Kolesnik
15	(South Korea); Seo Min-kyu	(Japan); Mone Chiba	(Germany); Minerva Fabienne Hase; Nikita Volodin	(United States); Emilea Zingas; Vadym Kolesnik
14		(Kazakhstan); Sofia Samodelkina	(Canada); Ava Kemp; Yohnatan Elizarov	(Czech Republic); Natálie Taschlerová; Filip Taschler
14		(Kazakhstan); Sofia Samodelkina	(Canada); Ava Kemp; Yohnatan Elizarov	(United States); Katarina Wolfkostin; Dimitry Tsarevski
14		(Kazakhstan); Sofia Samodelkina	(Canada); Ava Kemp; Yohnatan Elizarov	(Canada); Marie-Jade Lauriault; Romain Le Gac
14		(Kazakhstan); Sofia Samodelkina	(Canada); Ava Kemp; Yohnatan Elizarov	(United States); Leah Neset; Artem Markelov
13	(Individual Neutral Athletes); Vladislav Dikidzhi	(South Korea); Kim Yu-jae	(Individual Neutral Athletes); Aleksandra Boikova; Dmitrii Kozlovskii	(Finland); Juulia Turkkila; Matthias Versluis
13	(Italy); Daniel Grassl	(South Korea); Kim Yu-jae	(Individual Neutral Athletes); Aleksandra Boikova; Dmitrii Kozlovskii	(Finland); Juulia Turkkila; Matthias Versluis
13	(Japan); Rio Nakata	(South Korea); Kim Yu-jae	(Individual Neutral Athletes); Aleksandra Boikova; Dmitrii Kozlovskii	(Finland); Juulia Turkkila; Matthias Versluis
13	(Sweden); Andreas Nordebäck	(South Korea); Kim Yu-jae	(Individual Neutral Athletes); Aleksandra Boikova; Dmitrii Kozlovskii	(Finland); Juulia Turkkila; Matthias Versluis
12	(Estonia); Aleksandr Selevko			
12	(Canada); Stephen Gogolev			
11	(Israel); Tamir Kuperman	(Japan); Rino Matsuike	(Japan); Yuna Nagaoka; Sumitada Moriguchi	(Czech Republic); Kateřina Mrázková; Daniel Mrázek
11	(Individual Neutral Athletes); Evgeni Semenenko	(Japan); Rino Matsuike	(Japan); Yuna Nagaoka; Sumitada Moriguchi	(United States); Christina Carreira; Anthony Ponomarenko
11	(Japan); Sōta Yamamoto	(Japan); Rino Matsuike	(Japan); Yuna Nagaoka; Sumitada Moriguchi	(Spain); Olivia Smart; Tim Dieck
11	(Ukraine); Kyrylo Marsak	(Japan); Rino Matsuike	(Japan); Yuna Nagaoka; Sumitada Moriguchi	(Spain); Olivia Smart; Tim Dieck
10	(Georgia (country)); Nika Egadze		(United States); Valentina Plazas; Maximiliano Fernandez	
9	(Japan); Shun Sato	(Japan); Saki Miyake	(Armenia); Karina Akopova; Nikita Rakhmanin	(Spain); Sofía Val; Asaf Kazimov
9	(United States); Jason Brown	(Japan); Yuna Aoki	(Czech Republic); Anna Valesi; Martin Bidař	(Spain); Sofía Val; Asaf Kazimov
9	(United States); Jason Brown	(Japan); Rion Sumiyoshi	(Czech Republic); Anna Valesi; Martin Bidař	(Spain); Sofía Val; Asaf Kazimov
7	(Kazakhstan); Mikhail Shaidorov		(United States); Chelsea Liu; Ryan Bedard	(France); Loïcia Demougeot; Théo Le Mercier
7	(Mexico); Donovan Carrillo		(France); Camille Kovalev; Pavel Kovalev	(France); Loïcia Demougeot; Théo Le Mercier
5	(Poland); Vladimir Samoilov	(South Korea); Shin Ji-a	(Ukraine); Sofiia Holichenko; Artem Darenskyi	(United States); Emily Bratti; Ian Somerville
5	(Switzerland); Lukas Britschgi	(Individual Neutral Athletes); Adeliia Petrosian	(France); Aurélie Faula; Théo Belle	(Australia); Holly Harris; Jason Chan
5	(Estonia); Arlet Levandi	(Japan); Mako Yamashita	(France); Aurélie Faula; Théo Belle	(United States); Eva Pate; Logan Bye
5	(United States); Jimmy Ma	(Finland); Iida Karhunen	(France); Aurélie Faula; Théo Belle	(United States); Eva Pate; Logan Bye
4	(Czech Republic); Georgii Reshtenko	(United States); Sophie Joline von Felten		
4	(France); François Pitot	(South Korea); You Young		
4	(France); François Pitot	(United States); Sarah Everhardt		
3	(Germany); Genrikh Gartung	(South Korea); Yun Ah-sun		
3	(Germany); Genrikh Gartung	(China); Zhu Yi		
3	(United States); Jacob Sanchez	(South Korea); Kim Seo-young		
3	(United States); Jacob Sanchez	(Canada); Madeline Schizas		
3	(United States); Jacob Sanchez	(Italy); Sarina Joos		

=== Qualifiers ===
No.	Men	Women	Pairs	Ice dance
1	(Japan); Kao Miura	(Japan); Mao Shimada	(Georgia (country)); Anastasiia Metelkina; Luka Berulava	(France); Laurence Fournier Beaudry; Guillaume Cizeron
2	(Estonia); Mihhail Selevko	(Japan); Ami Nakai	(Canada); Lia Pereira; Trennt Michaud	(United Kingdom); Lilah Fear; Lewis Gibson
3		(Individual Neutral Athletes); Alexandra Ignatova	(Germany); Annika Hocke; Robert Kunkel	(France); Evgeniia Lopareva; Geoffrey Brissaud
4		(Estonia); Niina Petrõkina	(United States); Alisa Efimova; Misha Mitrofanov	
5				
6				

Alternates

No.	Men	Women	Pairs	Ice dance
1				
2				
3				

== Top scores ==
=== Men's singles ===
Top 10 best scores in the men’s combined total
No.	Skater	Nation	Score	Event
1	Kao Miura	Japan	293.25	2026 Cup of China
2	Ilia Malinin	United States	284.31	2026 Skate America
3	Adam Siao Him Fa	France	284.24	2026 Grand Prix de France
4	Vladislav Dikidzhi	Individual Neutral Athletes	282.44	2026 Cup of China
5	Evgeni Semenenko	Individual Neutral Athletes	281.62	2026 Cup of China
6	Shun Sato	Japan	277.20	2026 Cup of China
7	Daniel Grassl	Italy	274.73	2026 Skate America
8	Mikhail Shaidorov	Kazakhstan	263.49	2026 Cup of China
9	Kévin Aymoz	France	258.43	2026 Skate Canada International
10	Mihhail Selevko	Estonia	254.99	2026 Finlandia Trophy

Top 10 best scores in the men’s short program
No.	Skater	Nation	Score	Event
1	Kao Miura	Japan	102.90	2026 Cup of China
2	Adam Siao Him Fa	France	102.46	2026 Grand Prix de France
3	Shun Sato	Japan	101.97	2026 Cup of China
4	Evgeni Semenenko	Individual Neutral Athletes	99.72	2026 Cup of China
5	Vladislav Dikidzhi	Individual Neutral Athletes	98.86	2026 Cup of China
6	Ilia Malinin	United States	96.74	2026 Skate America
7	Mikhail Shaidorov	Kazakhstan	94.87	2026 Cup of China
8	Rio Nakata	Japan	92.64	2026 Skate Canada International
9	Sōta Yamamoto	Japan	91.29	2026 Skate America
10	Kévin Aymoz	France	90.26	2026 Skate Canada International

Top 10 best scores in the men’s free skating
No.	Skater	Nation	Score	Event
1	Kao Miura	Japan	190.35	2026 Cup of China
2	Daniel Grassl	Italy	188.25	2026 Skate America
3	Ilia Malinin	United States	187.57	2026 Skate America
4	Vladislav Dikidzhi	Individual Neutral Athletes	183.58	2026 Cup of China
5	Evgeni Semenenko	Individual Neutral Athletes	181.90	2026 Cup of China
6	Adam Siao Him Fa	France	181.78	2026 Grand Prix de France
7	Shun Sato	Japan	175.23	2026 Cup of China
8	Mihhail Selevko	Estonia	169.98	2026 Finlandia Trophy
9	Seo Min-kyu	South Korea	169.37	2026 Cup of China
10	Mikhail Shaidorov	Kazakhstan	168.62	2026 Cup of China

=== Women's singles ===
Top 10 best scores in the women’s combined total
No.	Skater	Nation	Score	Event
1	Ami Nakai	Japan	236.81	2026 Skate America
2	Mao Shimada	Japan	235.44	2026 Skate Canada International
3	Mone Chiba	Japan	224.48	2026 Cup of China
4	Alexandra Ignatova	Individual Neutral Athletes	221.27	2026 Cup of China
5	Niina Petrõkina	Estonia	221.07	2026 Skate Canada International
6	Isabeau Levito	United States	212.22	2026 Skate Canada International
7	Rino Matsuike	Japan	211.63	2026 Skate America
8	Lee Hae-in	South Korea	210.79	2026 Cup of China
9	Saki Miyake	Japan	210.09	2026 Skate Canada International
10	Anastasiia Gubanova	Georgia	208.58	2026 Cup of China

Top 10 best scores in the women's short program
No.	Skater	Nation	Score	Event
1	Ami Nakai	Japan	82.20	2026 Skate America
2	Mao Shimada	Japan	82.11	2026 Skate Canada International
3	Isabeau Levito	United States	78.50	2026 Skate Canada International
4	Niina Petrõkina	Estonia	77.24	2026 Skate Canada International
5	Yuna Aoki	Japan	76.31	2026 Grand Prix de France
6	Mone Chiba	Japan	76.08	2026 Cup of China
7	Anastasiia Gubanova	Georgia	75.05	2026 Cup of China
8	Alexandra Ignatova	Individual Neutral Athletes	74.24	2026 Skate America
9	Kim Yu-jae	South Korea	73.92	2026 Skate America
10	Saki Miyake	Japan	71.95	2026 Skate Canada International

Top 10 best scores in the women’s free skating
No.	Skater	Nation	Score	Event
1	Ami Nakai	Japan	154.61	2026 Skate America
2	Mao Shimada	Japan	153.33	2026 Skate Canada International
3	Alexandra Ignatova	Individual Neutral Athletes	148.90	2026 Cup of China
4	Mone Chiba	Japan	148.40	2026 Cup of China
5	Niina Petrõkina	Estonia	144.98	2026 Finlandia Trophy
6	Lee Hae-in	South Korea	143.30	2026 Cup of China
7	Rino Matsuike	Japan	141.33	2026 Skate America
8	Isabeau Levito	United States	140.17	2026 Finlandia Trophy
9	Shin Ji-a	South Korea	139.14	2026 Skate Canada International
10	Saki Miyake	Japan	138.14	2026 Skate Canada International

=== Pairs ===
Top 10 best scores in the pairs’ combined total
No.	Skater	Nation	Score	Event
1	Anastasia Mishina; Aleksandr Galliamov	Individual Neutral Athletes	209.84	2026 Cup of China
2	Anastasiia Metelkina; Luka Berulava	Georgia	204.65	2026 Grand Prix de France
3	Lia Pereira; Trennt Michaud	Canada	202.17	2026 Skate Canada International
4	Minerva Fabienne Hase; Nikita Volodin	Germany	200.79	2026 Skate America
5	Aleksandra Boikova; Dmitrii Kozlovskii	Individual Neutral Athletes	197.66	2026 Grand Prix de France
6	Annika Hocke; Robert Kunkel	Germany	196.40	2026 Finlandia Trophy
7	Audrey Shin; Spencer Akira Howe	United States	193.18	2026 Finlandia Trophy
8	Alisa Efimova; Misha Mitrofanov	United States	191.90	2026 Skate Canada International
9	Katie McBeath; Balázs Nagy	United States	191.25	2026 Finlandia Trophy
10	Oxana Vouillamoz; Tom Bouvart	Switzerland	183.56	2026 Skate America

Top 10 best scores in the pairs’ short program
No.	Skater	Nation	Score	Event
1	Anastasiia Metelkina; Luka Berulava	Georgia	77.34	2026 Grand Prix de France
2	Lia Pereira; Trennt Michaud	Canada	77.06	2026 Skate Canada International
3	Aleksandra Boikova; Dmitrii Kozlovskii	Individual Neutral Athletes	75.85	2026 Grand Prix de France
4	Anastasia Mishina; Aleksandr Galliamov	Individual Neutral Athletes	74.69	2026 Cup of China
5	Minerva Fabienne Hase; Nikita Volodin	Germany	72.71	2026 Skate America
6	Annika Hocke; Robert Kunkel	Germany	72.63	2026 Finlandia Trophy
7	Alisa Efimova; Misha Mitrofanov	United States	71.85	2026 Skate America
8	Katie McBeath; Balázs Nagy	United States	70.81	2026 Finlandia Trophy
9	Oxana Vouillamoz; Tom Bouvart	Switzerland	70.63	2026 Skate America
10	Ava Kemp; Yohnatan Elizarov	Canada	67.73	2026 Skate America

Top 10 best scores in the pairs’ free skating
No.	Skater	Nation	Score	Event
1	Anastasia Mishina; Aleksandr Galliamov	Individual Neutral Athletes	135.15	2026 Cup of China
2	Anastasiia Metelkina; Luka Berulava	Georgia	131.21	2026 Cup of China
3	Minerva Fabienne Hase; Nikita Volodin	Germany	128.08	2026 Skate America
4	Audrey Shin; Spencer Akira Howe	United States	125.92	2026 Finlandia Trophy
5	Lia Pereira; Trennt Michaud	Canada	125.11	2026 Skate Canada International
6	Annika Hocke; Robert Kunkel	Germany	123.77	2026 Finlandia Trophy
7	Aleksandra Boikova; Dmitrii Kozlovskii	Individual Neutral Athletes	121.81	2026 Grand Prix de France
8	Oxana Vouillamoz; Tom Bouvart	Switzerland	121.66	2026 Skate Canada International
9	Alisa Efimova; Misha Mitrofanov	United States	121.58	2026 Skate Canada International
10	Katie McBeath; Balázs Nagy	United States	120.44	2026 Finlandia Trophy

=== Ice dance ===
Top 10 best scores in the combined total (ice dance)
No.	Skater	Nation	Score	Event
1	Laurence Fournier Beaudry; Guillaume Cizeron	France	212.91	2026 Finlandia Trophy
2	Emilea Zingas; Vadym Kolesnik	United States	201.88	2026 Skate America
3	Lilah Fear; Lewis Gibson	Great Britain	201.17	2026 Skate Canada International
4	Evgeniia Lopareva; Geoffrey Brissaud	France	195.28	2026 Skate America
5	Diana Davis; Gleb Smolkin	Georgia	193.93	2026 Grand Prix de France
6	Kateřina Mrázková; Daniel Mrázek	Czech Republic	190.88	2026 Skate America
6	Juulia Turkkila; Matthias Versluis	Finland	190.88	2026 Finlandia Trophy
8	Christina Carreira; Anthony Ponomarenko	United States	189.36	2026 Grand Prix de France
9	Oona Brown; Gage Brown	United States	187.97	2026 Finlandia Trophy
10	Caroline Green; Michael Parsons	United States	186.02	2026 Skate Canada International

Top 10 best scores in the rhythm dance
No.	Skater	Nation	Score	Event
1	Laurence Fournier Beaudry; Guillaume Cizeron	France	85.78	2026 Finlandia Trophy
2	Emilea Zingas; Vadym Kolesnik	United States	82.52	2026 Skate America
3	Lilah Fear; Lewis Gibson	Great Britain	81.37	2026 Skate Canada International
4	Evgeniia Lopareva; Geoffrey Brissaud	France	79.94	2026 Skate America
5	Diana Davis; Gleb Smolkin	Georgia	79.31	2026 Cup of China
6	Christina Carreira; Anthony Ponomarenko	United States	77.83	2026 Grand Prix de France
7	Juulia Turkkila; Matthias Versluis	Finland	77.58	2026 Finlandia Trophy
8	Natalie Taschlerova; Filip Taschler	Czech Republic	76.65	2026 Finlandia Trophy
9	Kateřina Mrázková; Daniel Mrázek	Czech Republic	76.32	2026 Skate America
10	Oona Brown; Gage Brown	United States	76.22	2026 Finlandia Trophy

Top 10 best scores in the free dance
No.	Skater	Nation	Score	Event
1	Laurence Fournier Beaudry; Guillaume Cizeron	France	127.13	2026 Finlandia Trophy
2	Lilah Fear; Lewis Gibson	Great Britain	119.80	2026 Skate Canada International
3	Emilea Zingas; Vadym Kolesnik	United States	119.36	2026 Skate America
4	Diana Davis; Gleb Smolkin	Georgia	116.03	2026 Grand Prix de France
5	Evgeniia Lopareva; Geoffrey Brissaud	France	115.34	2026 Skate America
6	Kateřina Mrázková; Daniel Mrázek	Czech Republic	114.56	2026 Skate America
7	Juulia Turkkila; Matthias Versluis	Finland	113.30	2026 Finlandia Trophy
8	Caroline Green; Michael Parsons	United States	111.78	2026 Skate Canada International
9	Oona Brown; Gage Brown	United States	111.75	2026 Finlandia Trophy
10	Christina Carreira; Anthony Ponomarenko	United States	111.53	2026 Grand Prix de France
