= 2026 CS Nepela Memorial =

Figure skating competition

- Type: ISU Challenger Series
- Date: 24 – 27 September
- Season: 2026–27
- Location: Bratislava, Slovakia
- Host: Slovak Figure Skating Federation
- Venue: Ondrej Nepela Arena

Champions
- Men's singles: (Individual Neutral Athletes) Evgeni Semenenko
- Women's singles: (South Korea) Kim Yu-seong
- Ice dance: (Spain) Olivia Smart and Tim Dieck
- Previous: 2025 CS Nepela Memorial
- Next: 2027 CS Nepela Memorial
- Previous CS: 2026 CS Nebelhorn Trophy
- Next CS: 2026 CS Trialeti Trophy

The 2026 Nepela Memorial is a figure skating competition sanctioned by the International Skating Union (ISU), organized and hosted by the Slovak Figure Skating Federation, and the sixth event of the 2026–27 ISU Challenger Series. It will be held at the Ondrej Nepela Arena in Bratislava, Slovakia, from 24 to 27 September 2026. Medals will be awarded in men's singles, women's singles, and ice dance, and skaters will earn ISU World Standing points based on their results. Evgeni Semenenko of Individual Neutral Athlete, won the men's event; Kim Yu-seong of South Korea won the women's event; and Olivia Smart and Tim Dieck of Spain won the ice dance event.

== Background ==
The Nepela Memorial is named in honor of Ondrej Nepela, a Slovak figure skater who competed internationally for Czechoslovakia. He was the 1972 Olympic gold medalist, three-time World champion (1971–73), five-time European champion (1969–73), eight-time Czechoslovak national champion (1965–69, 1971–73), and the Slovak athlete of the 20th century.

The ISU Challenger Series was introduced in 2014. It is a series of international figure skating competitions sanctioned by the International Skating Union (ISU) and organized by ISU member nations. The objective was to ensure consistent organization and structure within a series of international competitions linked together, providing opportunities for senior-level skaters to compete at the international level and also earn ISU World Standing points. The 2026–27 Challenger Series consisted of thirteen events, of which the Nepela Memorial was the sixth.

== Changes in preliminary assignments ==
The International Skating Union published the preliminary list of entrants on 8 September 2026.

Discipline	Withdrew			Added			Ref.
Discipline	Date	Country	Skater(s)	Date	Country	Skater(s)	Ref.
Ice dance	20 September	Israel	Shira Ichilov; Mikhail Nosovitskiy	—N/a			
Women	20 September	Czech Republic	Barbora Vrankova	20 September	Czech Republic	Michaela Malkova	
Men	22 September	Chinese Taipei	Li Yu-hsiang	—N/a			
Women	25 September	Azerbaijan	Nargiz Sueleymanova	—N/a			

== Required performance elements ==
=== Single skating ===
Men and women competing in single skating first perform their short programs on 25 September. Lasting no more than 2 minutes 40 seconds, the short program has to include the following elements:

For men: one double or triple Axel; one triple or quadruple jump; one jump combination consisting of a double jump and a triple jump, two triple jumps, or a quadruple jump and a double jump or triple jump; one flying spin; one camel spin or sit spin with a change of foot; one spin combination with a change of foot; and one step sequence using the full ice surface.

For women: one double or triple Axel; one triple jump; one jump combination consisting of a double jump and a triple jump, or two triple jumps; one flying spin; one layback spin, sideways leaning spin, camel spin, or sit spin without a change of foot; one spin combination with a change of foot; and one step sequence using the full ice surface.

Men perform their free skates on September 26, while women perform theirs on September 27. The free skate can last no more than 4 minutes, and has to include the following: six jump elements, of which one has to be an Axel-type jump; three spins, of which one has to be a spin combination, one a flying spin, and one a choreographic spin; one step sequence; and a choreographic sequence.

=== Ice dance ===
Couples competing in ice dance first perform their rhythm dances on September 26. Lasting no more than 2 minutes 50 seconds, the theme of the rhythm dance this season is "Rhythm and Waltz". The rhythm dance has to include the following elements: one section of the Golden Waltz pattern dance, one creative dance element, one dance lift, one set of sequential twizzles, and one step sequence while not touching.

Couples then perform their free dances on September 27. The free dance can last no longer than 4 minutes, and has to include the following: three dance lifts or one short lift and one combination lift; one dance spin; one step sequence in hold; one set of synchronized twizzles, one one-foot turns sequence in hold, and two choreographic elements.

== Judging ==
Skaters are judged according to the required technical elements of their program (such as jumps and spins), as well as the overall presentation of their program, based on three program components (skating skills, presentation, and composition). Each technical element in a figure skating performance is assigned a predetermined base point value and scored by a panel of nine judges on a scale from −5 to +5 based on the quality of its execution. Each Grade of Execution (GOE) from –5 to +5 is assigned a value as indicated on the Scale of Values. For example, a triple Axel is worth a base value of 8.00 points, and a GOE of +3 is worth 2.40 points, so a triple Axel with a GOE of +3 earns 10.40 points. The judging panel's GOE for each element is determined by calculating the trimmed mean (the average after discarding the highest and lowest scores). The panel's scores for all elements are added together to generate a Total Elements Score. At the same time, the judges evaluate each performance based on the five aforementioned program components and assign each a score from 0.25 to 10 in 0.25-point increments. The judging panel's final score for each program component is also determined by calculating the trimmed mean. Those scores are then multiplied by the factor shown on the chart below; the results are added together to generate a total Program Component Score.

Program component factoring
Discipline	Short program or rhythm dance	Free skate or free dance
Men	1.67	3.33
Women	1.33	2.67
Ice dance	1.33	2.00

Deductions are applied for certain violations, such as time infractions, stops and restarts, or falls. The Total Elements Score and Program Component Score are then added together, minus any deductions, to generate a final performance score for each skater or team.

== Medal summary ==
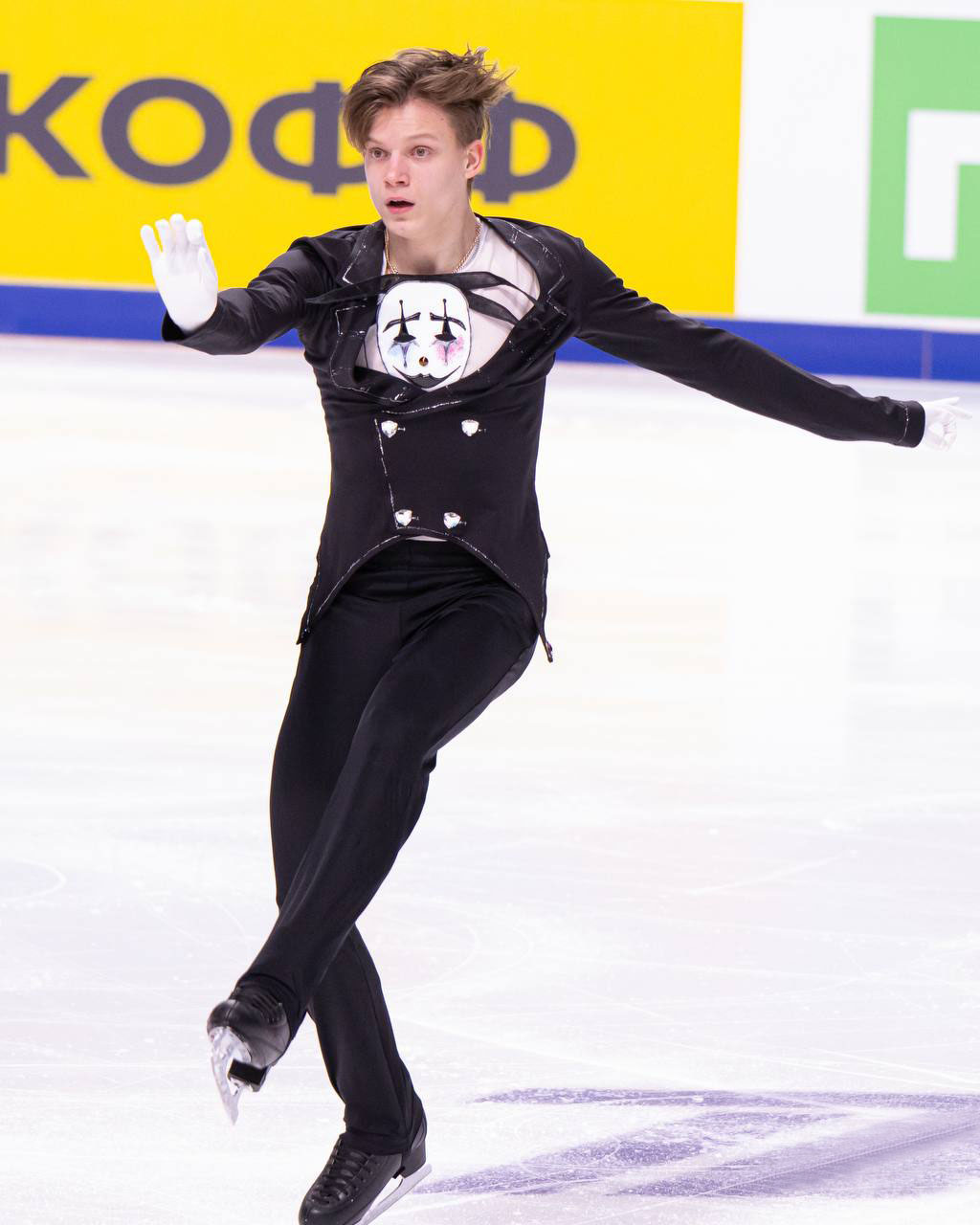
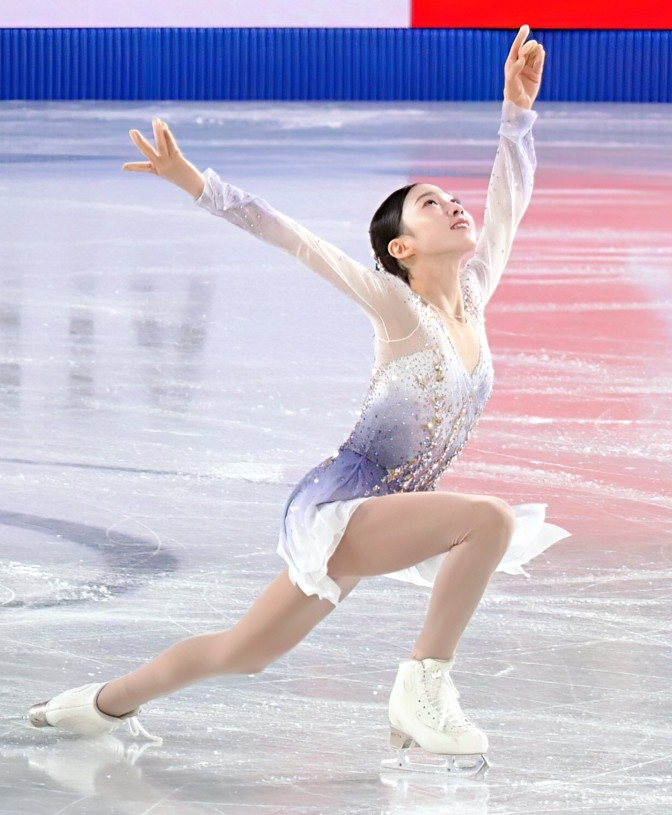
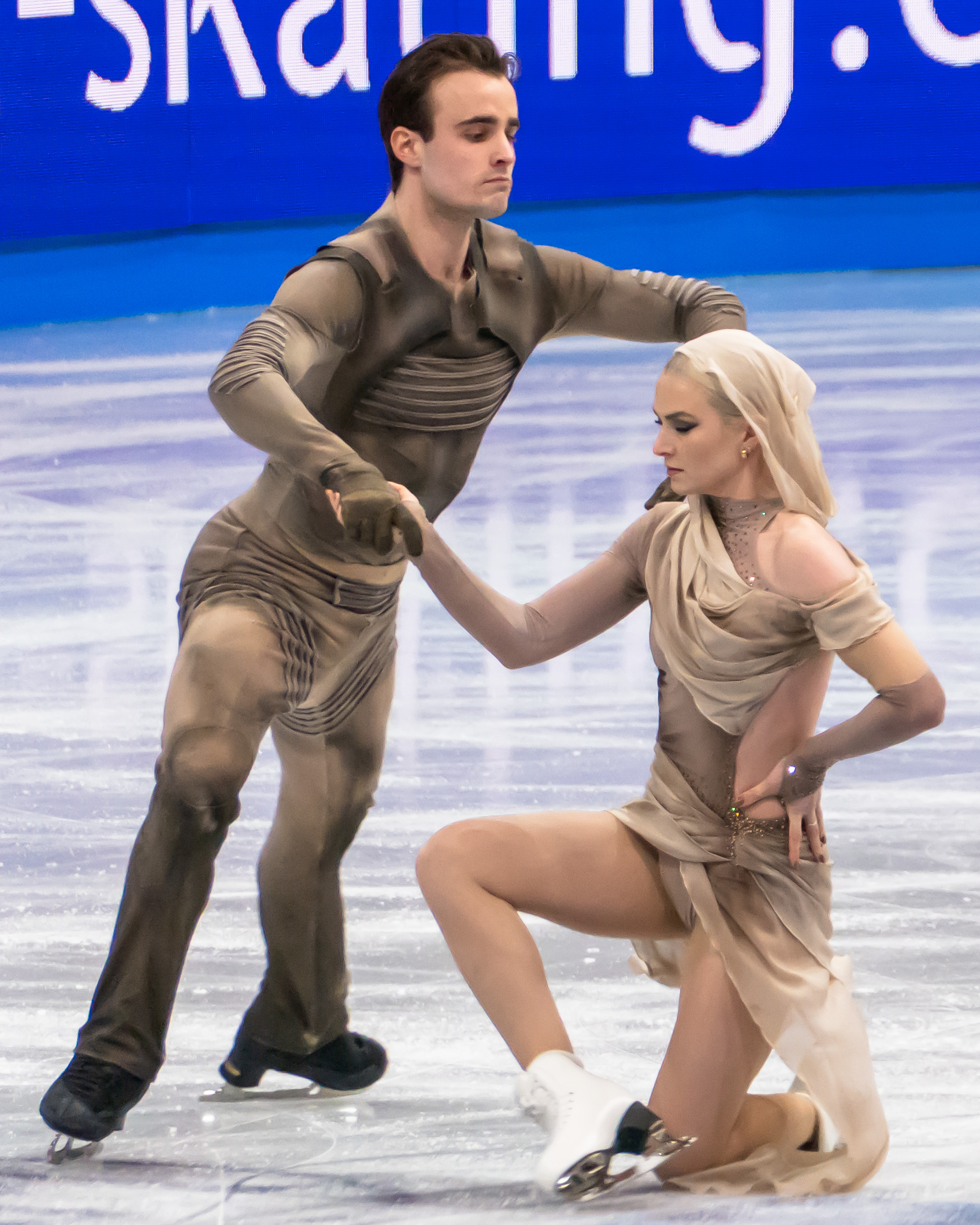
The 2026 Nepela Memorial champions (from left to right): Evgeni Semenenko of Individual Neutral Athlete (men's singles); Kim Yu-seong of South Korea (women's singles); and Olivia Smart and Tim Dieck of Spain (ice dance)

Medalists
Discipline	Gold	Silver	Bronze
Men	(Individual Neutral Athletes) Evgeni Semenenko	(Italy) Daniel Grassl	(Kazakhstan) Mikhail Shaidorov
Women	(South Korea) Kim Yu-seong	(South Korea) Lee Hae-in	(Slovakia) Olivia Lengyelová
Ice dance	(Spain); Olivia Smart; Tim Dieck	(Finland); Juulia Turkkila; Matthias Versluis	(United States); Oona Brown; Gage Brown

== Results ==
=== Men's singles ===
Men's results
Rank	Skater	Nation	Total points	SP		FS	
1	Evgeni Semenenko	(Individual Neutral Athletes) Individual Neutral Athlete	292.09	1	101.16	1	190.93
2	Daniel Grassl	Italy	278.80	2	99.10	2	179.70
3	Mikhail Shaidorov	Kazakhstan	272.75	3	95.98	3	176.77
4	Gleb Lutfullin	(Individual Neutral Athletes) Individual Neutral Athlete	251.46	4	85.70	5	165.76
5	Adam Siao Him Fa	France	249.35	9	79.18	4	170.17
6	Adam Hagara	Slovakia	225.18	6	80.23	6	144.95
7	Vladimir Samoilov	Poland	220.05	5	80.59	8	139.46
8	Samy Hammi	France	218.10	10	76.26	7	141.84
9	Andreas Nordebäck	Sweden	216.39	8	79.26	10	137.13
10	Grigory Fedorov	(Individual Neutral Athletes) Individual Neutral Athlete	213.80	7	80.16	11	133.64
11	Cha Young-hyun	South Korea	201.35	15	62.35	9	139.00
12	Lukáš Václavík	Slovakia	200.41	12	70.97	12	129.44
13	David Bondar	Canada	192.19	11	71.68	16	120.51
14	Goku Endo	United States	187.16	21	59.48	13	127.68
15	Elias Sayed	Sweden	186.48	18	60.59	14	125.89
16	Xan Rols	France	186.12	14	64.55	15	121.57
17	Hugo Bostedt	Sweden	181.21	13	64.97	18	116.24
18	Georgii Reshtenko	Czech Republic	180.11	19	59.98	17	120.13
19	Vadym Novikov	Ukraine	173.04	20	59.80	19	113.24
20	Maksym Petrychenko	Austria	164.92	24	54.29	20	110.63
21	David Sedej	Slovenia	154.25	16	61.72	23	92.53
22	Arin Yorke	United Kingdom	153.05	17	60.68	24	92.37
23	Aleksei Vlasenko	Hungary	152.13	22	56.44	21	95.69
24	Tadeáš Václavík	Czech Republic	148.19	23	55.02	22	93.17
25	Jan Valtera	Czech Republic	133.68	25	50.10	25	83.58
26	Jedidiah Lincoln	United Kingdom	126.11	26	45.51	27	80.60
27	Jozef Čurma	Slovakia	123.62	28	41.20	26	82.42
28	Daniel Korabelnik	Lithuania	120.88	27	45.29	28	75.59

=== Women's singles ===
Women's results
Rank	Skater	Nation	Total points	SP		FS	
1	Kim Yu-seong	South Korea	202.70	4	61.27	1	141.43
2	Lee Hae-in	South Korea	190.55	2	63.12	2	127.43
3	Olivia Lengyelová	Slovakia	182.99	3	62.28	3	120.71
4	Sophie Joline von Felten	United States	175.64	5	60.15	4	115.49
5	Gabrielle Daleman	Canada	166.69	6	59.72	5	106.97
6	Nina Pinzarrone	Belgium	164.89	7	58.84	6	106.05
7	Julia Sauter	Romania	163.23	1	64.03	7	99.20
8	Reese Rose	Canada	151.62	9	54.96	8	96.66
9	Youn Seo-jin	South Korea	150.20	10	54.82	10	95.38
10	Kateřina Hanušová	Czech Republic	146.59	11	50.61	9	95.98
11	Elyce Lin-Gracey	United States	145.88	8	57.43	14	88.45
12	Eve Dubecq	France	138.93	12	50.22	13	88.71
13	Karolina Białas	Poland	136.93	18	44.11	11	92.82
14	Adéla Vallová	Czech Republic	136.60	14	46.05	12	90.55
15	Maxine Bautista	Philippines	133.04	13	46.65	15	86.39
16	Yelyzaveta Surova	Poland	125.72	17	44.73	16	80.99
17	Terézia Pócsová	Slovakia	125.37	16	44.92	17	80.45
18	Julija Lovrenčič	Slovenia	123.22	15	45.24	18	77.98
19	Polina Dzsumanyijazova	Hungary	116.70	21	41.72	19	74.98
20	Inès Belot	France	116.42	19	43.98	22	72.44
21	Sofiia Ekzarkhova	Ukraine	115.49	20	42.77	21	72.72
22	Paula Belevica	Latvia	112.39	22	39.33	20	73.06
23	Adelija Matjunina	Latvia	86.84	23	31.06	24	55.78
24	Linda Dzerve	Latvia	86.33	25	27.06	23	59.27
25	Julia Fennell	Israel	83.63	24	28.92	25	54.71
WD	Nargiz Süleymanova	Azerbaijan	Withdrew from competition				

=== Ice dance ===
Ice dance results
Rank	Team	Nation	Total points	RD		FD	
1	Olivia Smart; Tim Dieck	Spain	197.22	1	79.17	1	118.05
2	Juulia Turkkila; Matthias Versluis	Finland	194.10	3	76.45	2	117.65
3	Oona Brown; Gage Brown	United States	190.81	2	76.59	3	114.22
4	Natálie Taschlerová; Filip Taschler	Czech Republic	180.94	4	74.20	5	106.74
5	Caroline Green; Michael Parsons	United States	178.78	10	68.12	4	110.66
6	Yuka Orihara; Juho Pirinen	Finland	178.72	5	73.79	6	104.93
7	Irina Khavronina; Devid Naryzhnyy	(Individual Neutral Athletes) Individual Neutral Athlete	177.93	7	73.38	7	104.55
8	Loïcia Demougeot; Théo le Mercier	France	177.80	6	73.40	8	104.40
9	Alicia Fabbri; Marko Jevgeni Gaidajenko	Canada	175.08	8	72.08	10	103.00
10	Eva Pate; Logan Bye	United States	169.26	11	65.58	9	103.68
11	Sofía Val; Asaf Kazimov	Spain	168.48	9	69.87	11	98.61
12	Chelsea Verhaegh; Sherim van Geffen	Netherlands	153.35	13	60.76	12	92.59
13	Iryna Pidgaina; Artem Koval	Ukraine	152.49	12	65.04	15	87.45
14	Gina Zehnder; Beda Leon Sieber	Switzerland	145.42	16	55.53	13	89.89
15	Denisa Cimlová; Stefano Frasca	Italy	144.55	14	56.97	14	87.58
16	Zofia Grzegorzewska; Oleg Muratov	Poland	142.67	15	56.24	16	86.43
17	Anita Straub; Andreas Straub	Austria	135.98	17	54.27	17	81.71
18	Sophia Awny Farajallah; Maksym Spodyriev	Egypt	117.52	18	48.21	18	69.31

== Works cited ==
- "Sports Rules – Single & Pair Skating and Ice Dance" (PDF). International Skating Union. Archived (PDF) from the original on 24 May 2026.
