= 2026 Finlandia Trophy =

Figure skating competition

- Type: Grand Prix
- Date: 20 – 21 November
- Season: 2026–27
- Location: Helsinki, Finland
- Host: Skating Finland
- Venue: Helsinki Ice Hall

Champions
- Men's singles: (Estonia) Mihhail Selevko
- Women's singles: (Japan) Mao Shimada
- Pairs: (Germany) Annika Hocke and Robert Kunkel
- Ice dance: (France) Laurence Fournier Beaudry and Guillaume Cizeron
- Previous: 2025 Finlandia Trophy
- Next: 2027 Finlandia Trophy
- Previous Grand Prix: 2026 Skate America
- Next Grand Prix: 2026 NHK Trophy

The 2026 Finlandia Trophy is a figure skating competition sanctioned by the International Skating Union (ISU). Organized and hosted by Skating Finland, it is the fourth event of the 2026–27 ISU Grand Prix of Figure Skating: a senior-level international invitational competition series. It will be held from 20 to 21 November at the Helsinki Ice Hall in Helsinki, Finland. Medals will be awarded in men's singles, women's singles, pair skating, and ice dance. Skaters will earn points based on their results, and the top skaters or teams in each discipline at the end of the season will be invited to then compete at the 2026–27 Grand Prix Final in Chongqing, China. Skaters can earn points towards the World Standings and Season's World Ranking based on their results.

Mihhail Selevko of Estonia won the men's event, Mao Shimada of Japan won the women's event, Annika Hocke and Robert Kunkel of Germany won the pairs event, and Laurence Fournier Beaudry and Guillaume Cizeron of France won the ice dance event.

== Background ==
The ISU Grand Prix of Figure Skating is a series of seven events sanctioned by the International Skating Union (ISU) and held during the autumn: six qualifying events and the Grand Prix of Figure Skating Final. This allows skaters to perfect their programs earlier in the season, as well as compete against the skaters whom they would later encounter at the World Championships. Skaters earn points based on their results in their respective competitions and the top skaters or teams in each discipline are invited to compete at the Grand Prix Final. The first edition of the Grand Prix of Finland was held in 2018 in Helsinki as a replacement event for the Cup of China – a long-time event in the Grand Prix series – after the Chinese Skating Association declined to host any international skating events in order to prepare its venues for the 2022 Winter Olympics. Following the 2022 Russian invasion of Ukraine, the Rostelecom Cup, which had been scheduled in Russia for that November, was cancelled. As such, the Grand Prix of Finland was staged to serve as its replacement. In 2024, the Grand Prix of Finland adopted the name Finlandia Trophy, which had previously been the name of Finland's Challenger Series event.

The 2026 Finlandia Trophy is the fifth event of the 2026–27 Grand Prix of Figure Skating series, and will be held from 20 to 21 November at the Helsinki Ice Hall in Helsinki, Finland.

On the November 17, the Figure Skating Federation of Russia announced that Russian citizens were denied entry into Finland, due to Finland's Ministry of Foreign Affairs imposing the restriction of Russian nationals into their country, despite having visas. "Finland has tightened restrictions on the entry of Russian citizens into the country. According to the information we received from the Finnish authorities, Russian athletes, including those in neutral status, do not meet the conditions for entry into Finland. This also applies to Russian athletes going on a Schengen visa to participate in the Finlandia Trophy tournament". The named Russian athletes to compete were forced to withdraw after being denied entry into the country. The International Skating Union invited the skaters and teams next in line on the reserve list.

== Entries ==
The International Skating Union published the initial list of entrants on 16 June 2026.

Country	Men	Women	Pairs	Ice dance
Canada	Stephen Gogolev	—N/a	Lia Pereira; Trennt Michaud	Marie-Jade Lauriault; Romain Le Gac
Canada	—N/a			Marjorie Lajoie; Jean-Luc Baker
China	Chen Yudong	—N/a		
Czech Republic	—N/a			Natálie Taschlerová; Filip Taschler
Estonia	Arlet Levandi	Niina Petrõkina	—N/a	
Estonia	Mihhail Selevko	—N/a	—N/a	
Finland	Matias Lindfors	Iida Karhunen	—N/a	Yuka Orihara; Juho Pirinen
Finland	—N/a	Minja Peltonen	—N/a	Juulia Turkkila; Matthias Versluis
Finland	—N/a	Janna Jyrkinen	—N/a	—N/a
France	Adam Siao Him Fa	—N/a	Louise Ehrhard; Matthis Pellegris	Laurence Fournier Beaudry; Guillaume Cizeron
Georgia	Nika Egadze	—N/a		
Germany	Genrikh Gartung	—N/a	Annika Hocke; Robert Kunkel	—N/a
Italy	—N/a	Anna Pezzetta	Irma Caldara; Riccardo Maglio	—N/a
Japan	Kazuki Tomono	Mao Shimada	—N/a	
Japan	—N/a	Rion Sumiyoshi	—N/a	
Japan	—N/a	Rinka Watanabe	—N/a	
South Korea	—N/a	Kim Seo-yeong	—N/a	
South Korea	—N/a	Lee Hae-in	—N/a	
South Korea	—N/a	Kim Yu-seong	—N/a	
Sweden	Andreas Nordebäck	—N/a		Milla Ruud Reitan; Nikolaj Majorov
Ukraine	Kyrylo Marsak	—N/a	Hannah Herrera; Ivan Khobta	—N/a
United States	—N/a	Isabeau Levito	Valentina Plazas; Maximiliano Fernandez	Emily Bratti; Ian Somerville
United States	—N/a			Oona Brown; Gage Brown
United States	—N/a			Caroline Green; Michael Parsons

== Changes to preliminary assignments ==
Changes to preliminary assignments
Discipline	Withdrew		Added		Notes	Ref.
Discipline	Date	Skater(s)	Date	Skater(s)	Notes	Ref.
Women	—N/a		17 June	(Finland); Iida Karhunen	Host pick	
Pairs	31 July	(Austria); Sophia Schaller; Livio Mayr	4 August	(Italy); Irma Caldara; Riccardo Maglio	Schaller/Mayr retired.	
Women	25 August	(United States); Alysa Liu	1 September	(South Korea); Kim Yu-seong	Taking season off	
Men	2 September	(Italy); Matteo Rizzo	4 September	(China); Chen Yudong		
Ice dance	8 September	(Lithuania); Allison Reed; Saulius Ambrulevičius	10 September	(Canada); Marjorie Lajoie; Jean-Luc Baker	Taking time off	
Pairs	11 September	(France); Louise Ehrhard; Matthis Pellegris	14 September	(Individual Neutral Athletes); Aleksandra Boikova; Dmitrii Kozlovskii		
Men	—N/a		15 September	(Finland); Matias Lindfors	Host picks	
Women	—N/a		15 September	(Finland); Janna Jyrkinen	Host picks	
Pairs	2 October	(Hungary); Maria Pavlova; Alexei Sviatchenko	5 October	(Individual Neutral Athletes); Ekaterina Chikmareva; Matvei Ianchenkov	Surgery (Sviatchenko)	
Men	21 October	(United States); Andrew Torgashev	22 October	(Individual Neutral Athletes); Evgeni Semenenko	Not competing in Grand Prix Series	
Pairs	28 October	(Austria); Gabriella Izzo; Luc Maierhofer	29 October	(Individual Neutral Athletes); Anastasia Mishina; Aleksandr Galliamov		
Women	5 November	(Finland); Olivia Lisko	5 November	(Finland); Minja Peltonen	Injury	
Men	18 November	(Individual Neutral Athletes); Evgeni Semenenko	18 November	(Israel); Tamir Kuperman	Finland's tightened restrictions on entry of Russian citizens.	
Pairs	18 November	(Individual Neutral Athletes); Aleksandra Boikova; Dmitrii Kozlovskii	18 November	(United States); Audrey Shin; Spencer Akira Howe	Finland's tightened restrictions on entry of Russian citizens.	
Pairs	18 November	(Individual Neutral Athletes); Anastasia Mishina; Aleksandr Galliamov	18 November	(United States); Katie McBeath; Balazs Nagy	Finland's tightened restrictions on entry of Russian citizens.	
Pairs	18 November	(Individual Neutral Athletes); Ekaterina Chikmareva; Matvei Ianchenkov	18 November	(France); Megan Wessenberg; Denys Strekalin	Finland's tightened restrictions on entry of Russian citizens.	

== Required performance elements ==
=== Single skating ===
Lasting no more than 2 minutes 40 seconds, the short program has to include the following elements:

For men: one double or triple Axel; one triple or quadruple jump; one jump combination consisting of a double jump and a triple jump, two triple jumps, or a quadruple jump and a double jump or triple jump; one flying spin; one camel spin or sit spin with a change of foot; one spin combination with a change of foot; and one step sequence using the full ice surface.

For women: one double or triple Axel; one triple jump; one jump combination consisting of a double jump and a triple jump, or two triple jumps; one flying spin; one layback spin, sideways leaning spin, camel spin, or sit spin without a change of foot; one spin combination with a change of foot; and one step sequence using the full ice surface.

The free skate can last no more than 4 minutes, and has to include the following: six jump elements, of which one has to be an Axel-type jump; three spins, of which one has to be a spin combination, one a flying spin, and one a choreographic spin; one step sequence; and a choreographic sequence.

=== Pair skating ===
Lasting no more than 2 minutes 40 seconds, the short program has to include the following elements: one group 3 pair lift, one double or triple twist lift, one double or triple throw jump, one double or triple solo jump, one pair spin combination, one forward inside death spiral, and one step sequence using the full ice surface.

The free skate could last no more than 4 minutes, and has to include the following: two pair lifts (from different lift groups), one twist lift, two different throw jumps, one solo jump, one jump combination or sequence, one choreographic pair lift, one choreographic pair spin, and one death spiral (different type from the one done in the short program).

=== Ice dance ===
Lasting no more than 2 minutes 50 seconds, the theme of the rhythm dance this season is "Rhythm and Waltz". The rhythm dance has to include the following elements: one section of the Golden Waltz pattern dance, one creative dance element, one dance lift, one set of sequential twizzles, and one step sequence while not touching.

The free dance can last no longer than 4 minutes, and has to include the following: three dance lifts or one short lift and one combination lift; one dance spin; one step sequence in hold; one set of synchronized twizzles, one one-foot turns sequence in hold, and two choreographic elements.

== Judging ==
Skaters are judged according to the required technical elements of their program (such as jumps and spins), as well as the overall presentation of their program, based on three program components (skating skills, presentation, and composition). Each technical element in a figure skating performance is assigned a predetermined base point value and scored by a panel of nine judges on a scale from −5 to +5 based on the quality of its execution. Each Grade of Execution (GOE) from –5 to +5 is assigned a value as indicated on the Scale of Values. For example, a triple Axel is worth a base value of 8.00 points, and a GOE of +3 is worth 2.40 points, so a triple Axel with a GOE of +3 earns 10.40 points. The judging panel's GOE for each element is determined by calculating the trimmed mean (the average after discarding the highest and lowest scores). The panel's scores for all elements are added together to generate a Total Elements Score. At the same time, the judges evaluate each performance based on the five aforementioned program components and assign each a score from 0.25 to 10 in 0.25-point increments. The judging panel's final score for each program component is also determined by calculating the trimmed mean. Those scores are then multiplied by the factor shown on the chart below; the results are added together to generate a total Program Component Score.

Program component factoring
Discipline	Short program or rhythm dance	Free skate or free dance
Men	1.67	3.33
Women	1.33	2.67
Pairs	1.33	2.67
Ice dance	1.33	2.00

Deductions are applied for certain violations, such as time infractions, stops and restarts, or falls. The Total Elements Score and Program Component Score are then added together, minus any deductions, to generate a final performance score for each skater or team.

== Medal summary ==
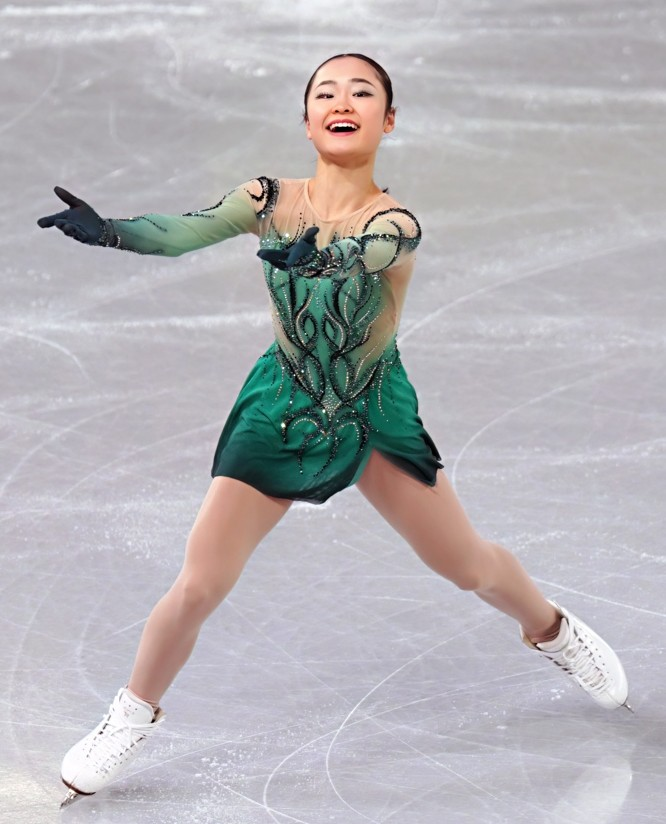
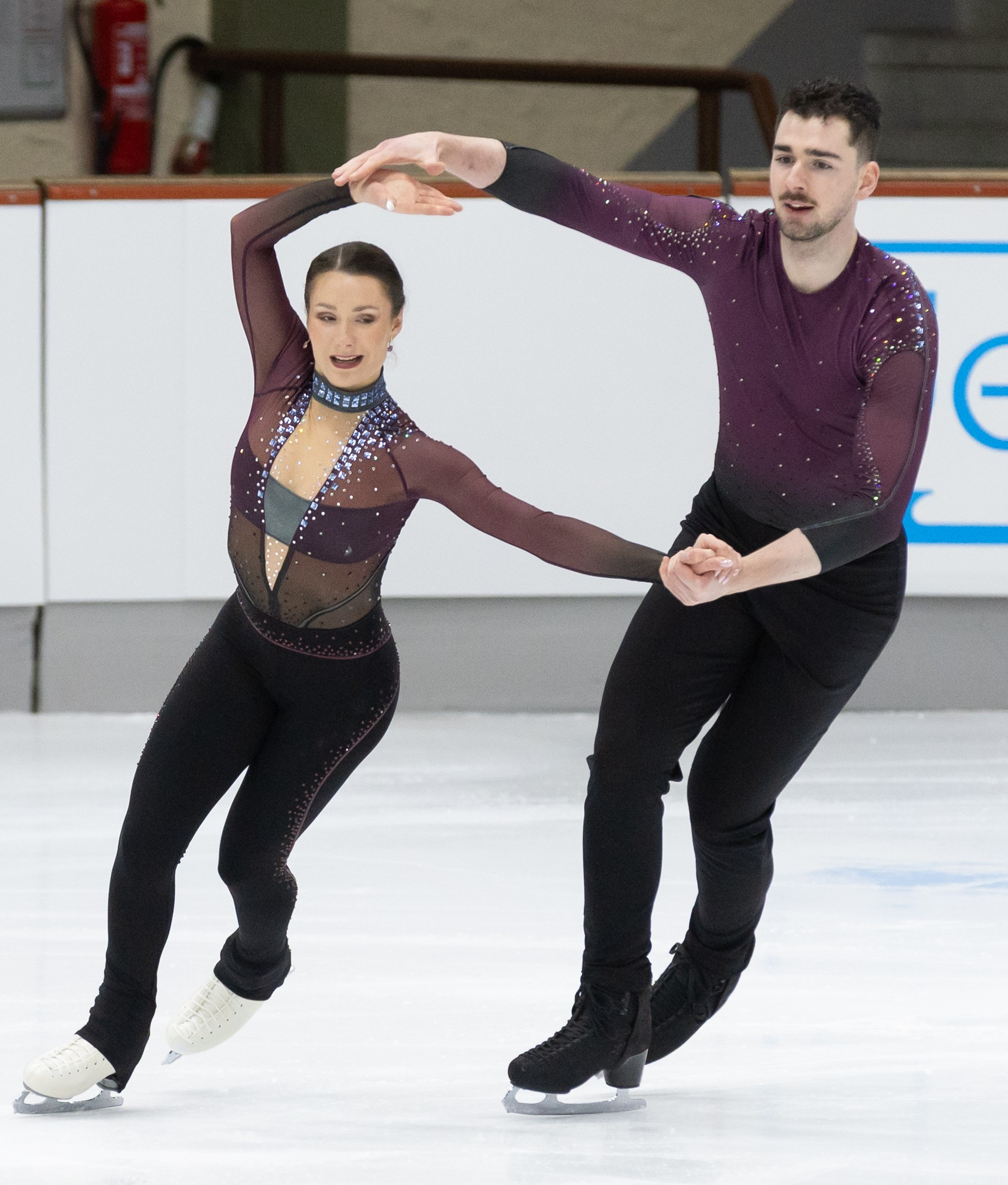
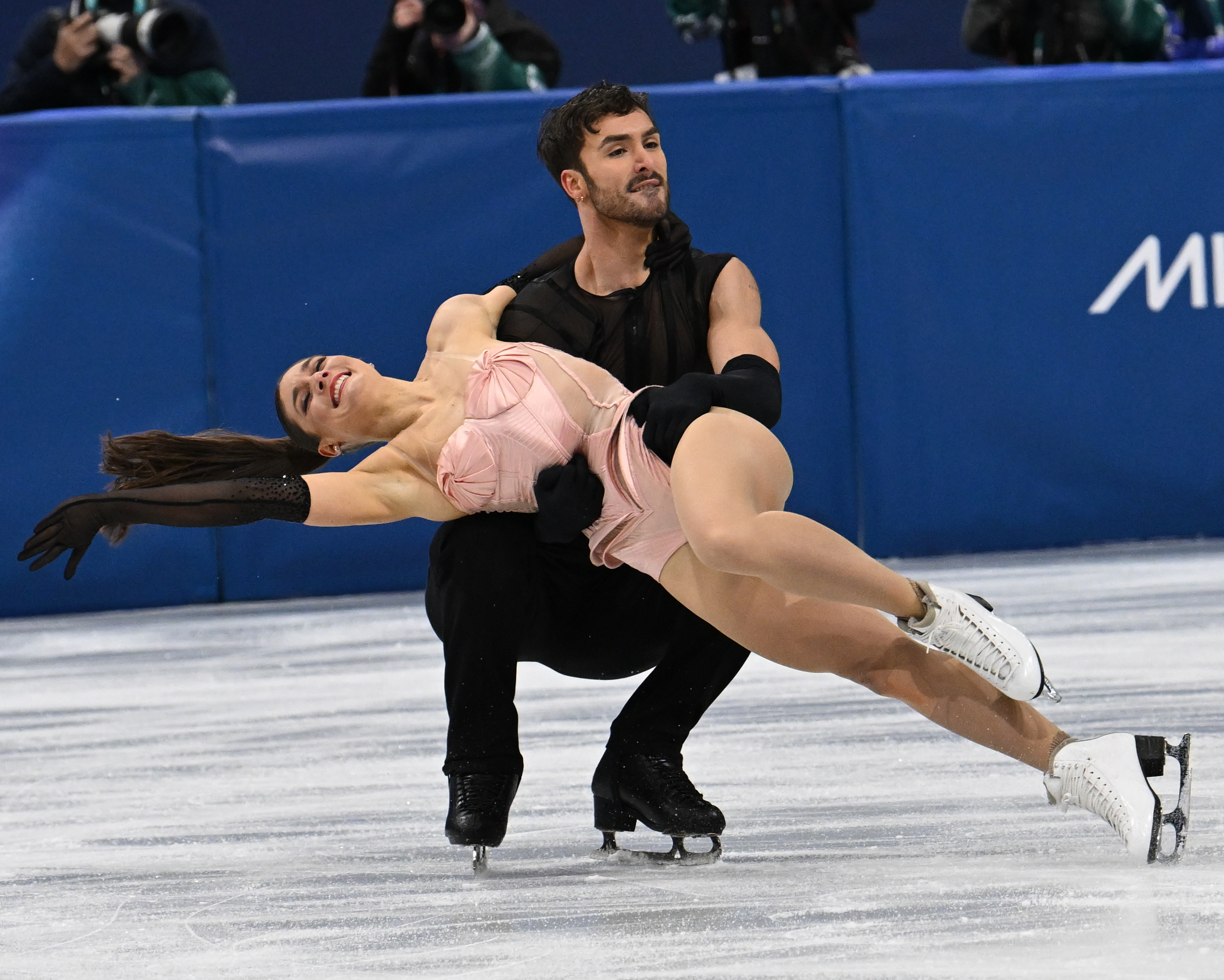
The reigning Grand Prix of Finland champions (from left to right): Mihhail Selevko of Estonia (men's singles); Mao Shimada of Japan (women's singles); Annika Hocke and Robert Kunkel of Germany (pair skating); and Laurence Fournier Beaudry and Guillaume Cizeron of France (ice dance)

Medalists
Discipline	Gold	Silver	Bronze
Men	(Estonia); Mihhail Selevko	(Sweden); Andreas Nordebäck	(Japan); Kazuki Tomono
Women	(Japan); Mao Shimada	(Estonia); Niina Petrõkina	(United States); Isabeau Levito
Pairs	(Germany); Annika Hocke; Robert Kunkel	(Canada); Lia Pereira; Trennt Michaud	(United States); Audrey Shin; Spencer Akira Howe
Ice dance	(France); Laurence Fournier Beaudry; Guillaume Cizeron	(Finland); Juulia Turkkila; Matthias Versluis	(United States); Oona Brown; Gage Brown

== Results ==
=== Men's singles ===
Concluding the men's competition, Andreas Nordebäck became the first male skater representing Sweden to win a senior ISU Grand Prix medal. Additionally, Mihhail Selevko became the first Estonian skater to win a senior ISU Grand Prix.

Men's results
Rank	Skater	Nation	Total points	SP		FS	
1	Mihhail Selevko	Estonia	254.99	1	85.01	1	169.98
2	Andreas Nordebäck	Sweden	240.94	3	82.08	3	158.86
3	Kazuki Tomono	Japan	237.75	5	79.45	4	158.30
4	Adam Siao Him Fa	France	230.54	12	71.63	2	158.91
5	Nika Egadze	Georgia	229.00	4	79.45	6	149.55
6	Arlet Levandi	Estonia	228.37	6	78.48	5	149.89
7	Kyrylo Marsak	Ukraine	220.05	11	72.10	7	147.95
8	Stephen Gogolev	Canada	216.61	7	76.88	8	139.73
9	Matias Lindfors	Finland	215.67	8	76.74	10	138.93
10	Tamir Kuperman	Israel	212.39	9	75.82	11	136.57
11	Genrikh Gartung	Germany	211.64	10	72.19	9	139.45
12	Chen Yudong	China	201.04	2	82.88	12	118.16

=== Women's singles ===
Niina Petrõkina became the first Estonian skater to qualify for the Grand Prix Final.

Women's results
Rank	Skater	Nation	Total points	SP		FS	
1	Mao Shimada	Japan	229.49	1	79.06	1	150.43
2	Niina Petrõkina	Estonia	214.06	2	69.08	2	144.98
3	Isabeau Levito	United States	207.19	6	67.02	3	140.17
4	Kim Yu-seong	South Korea	204.86	4	68.38	4	136.48
5	Lee Hae-in	South Korea	192.63	5	67.76	5	124.87
6	Iida Karhunen	Finland	186.47	7	66.24	6	120.23
7	Rion Sumiyoshi	Japan	179.87	8	64.06	8	115.81
8	Kim Seo-young	South Korea	177.53	3	69.03	10	108.50
9	Anna Pezzetta	Italy	176.65	10	57.71	7	118.94
10	Rinka Watanabe	Japan	162.80	11	50.68	9	112.12
11	Janna Jyrkinen	Finland	156.40	9	59.74	11	96.66
12	Minja Peltonen	Finland	145.71	12	49.35	12	96.36

=== Pairs ===
Pairs' results
Rank	Team	Nation	Total points	SP		FS	
1	Annika Hocke; Robert Kunkel	Germany	196.40	2	72.63	2	123.77
2	Lia Pereira; Trennt Michaud	Canada	195.28	1	74.39	3	120.89
3	Audrey Shin; Spencer Akira Howe	United States	193.18	4	67.26	1	125.92
4	Katie McBeath; Balázs Nagy	United States	191.25	3	70.81	4	120.44
5	Megan Wessenberg; Denys Strekalin	France	162.03	6	60.71	5	101.32
6	Valentina Plazas; Maximiliano Fernandez	United States	153.98	5	60.87	6	93.11
7	Irma Caldara; Riccardo Maglio	Italy	145.04	8	54.27	7	90.77
8	Hannah Herrera; Ivan Khobta	Ukraine	142.56	7	55.63	8	86.93

=== Ice dance ===
Ice dance results
Rank	Team	Nation	Total points	RD		FD	
1	Laurence Fournier Beaudry; Guillaume Cizeron	France	212.91	1	85.78	1	127.13
2	Juulia Turkkila; Matthias Versluis	Finland	190.88	2	77.58	2	113.30
3	Oona Brown; Gage Brown	United States	187.97	4	76.22	3	111.75
4	Caroline Green; Michael Parsons	United States	184.61	5	75.21	4	109.40
5	Marie-Jade Lauriault; Romain Le Gac	Canada	181.08	6	73.16	5	107.92
6	Natálie Taschlerová; Filip Taschler	Czech Republic	178.58	3	76.65	7	101.93
7	Yuka Orihara; Juho Pirinen	Finland	177.08	7	70.74	6	106.34
8	Marjorie Lajoie; Jean-Luc Baker	Canada	167.71	9	68.00	8	99.71
9	Emily Bratti; Ian Somerville	United States	167.42	8	70.55	9	96.87
10	Milla Ruud Reitan; Nikolaj Majorov	Sweden	154.13	10	60.96	10	93.17

== Works cited ==
- "Sports Rules – Single & Pair Skating and Ice Dance" (PDF). International Skating Union. Archived (PDF) from the original on 24 May 2026.
