= Evgeni Semenenko =

Russian figure skater

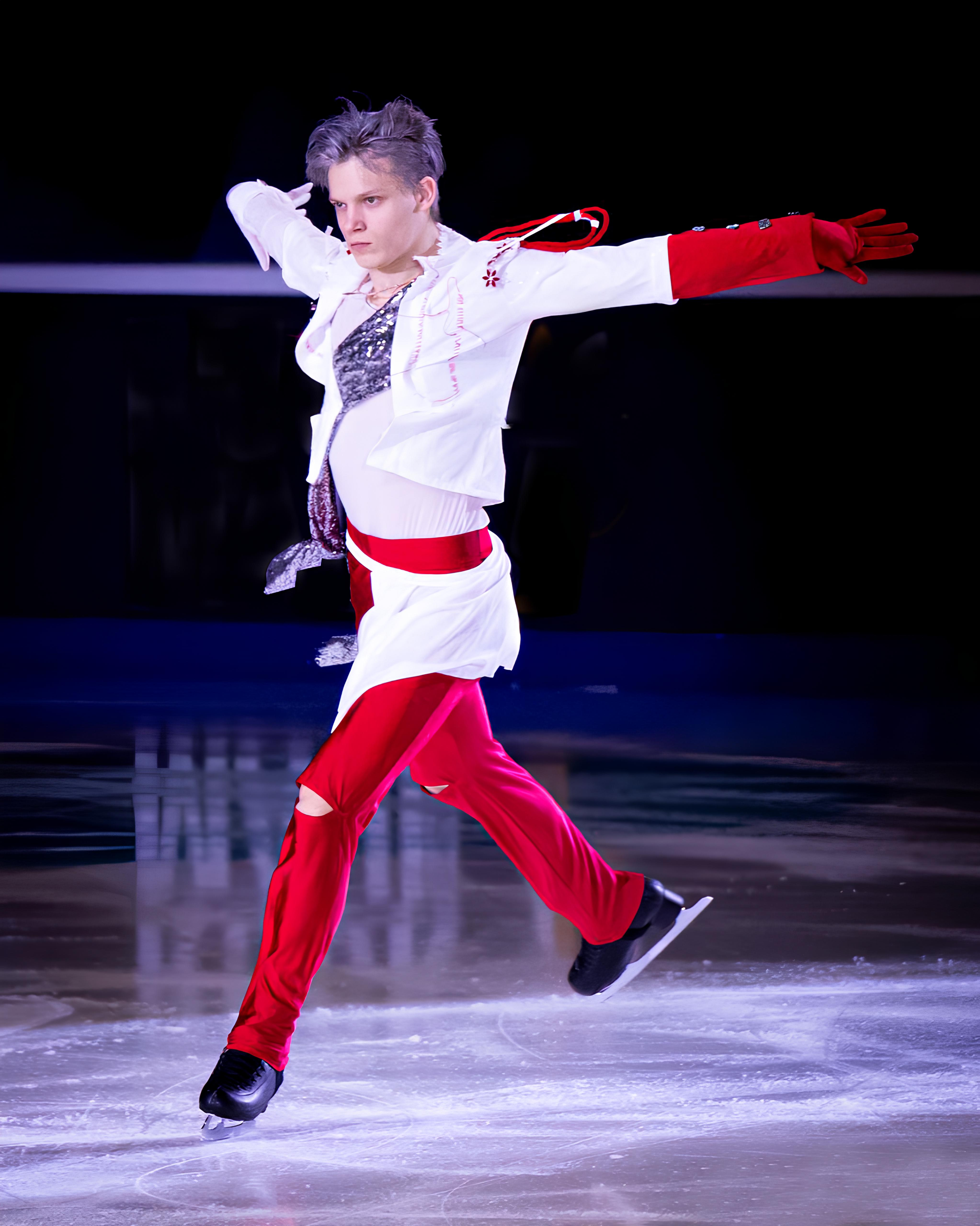
- Evgeni Semenenko at the 2024 Russian Championships

Personal information
- Native name: Евгений Станиславович Семененко (Russian)
- Full name: Evgeni Stanislavovich Semenenko
- Other names: Evgeniy/Evgeny
- Born: 26 July 2003 (age 23) Saint Petersburg, Russia
- Height: 1.76 m (5 ft 9 in)

Figure skating career
- Country: (Individual Neutral Athletes) Individual Neutral Athlete; Russia
- Discipline: Men's singles
- Coach: Tatiana Mishina; Alexei Mishin
- Skating club: Olympic School Zvezdni Led St. Petersburg
- Began skating: 2008
- Highest WS: 17th (2021–22)

Medal record
Russian Championships
Gold medal – first place	2023 Krasnoyarsk	Singles
Gold medal – first place	2024 Chelyabinsk	Singles
Silver medal – second place	2026 Saint Petersburg	Singles
Bronze medal – third place	2025 Omsk	Singles
World Team Trophy
Gold medal – first place	2021 Osaka	Team

Evgeni Stanislavovich Semenenko (Russian: Евгений Станиславович Семененко, IPA: [jɪvˈɡʲenʲɪj sʲɪmʲɪˈnʲenkə]; born 26 July 2003) is a Russian figure skater who currently competes as an Individual Neutral Athlete. He is a two-time Grand Prix medalist and a two-time Russian national champion (2023–24). He placed in the top eight at the 2021 World Championships. He was the best result of Russia at 2022 Winter Olympics, placing 8th all-around. On the junior level, he is the 2021 Russian junior national champion.

== Personal life ==
Semenenko was born in Saint Petersburg, Russia on 26 July, 2003. He graduated from high school with honors in 2021 and has been studying at the medical faculty of First Pavlov State Medical University of St. Petersburg ever since.

== Career ==
=== Early career ===
Evgeni started skating when he was 5 years old. At the age of 8, Evgeni joined the team of Alexei Mishin and Tatiana Mishina. In his international advanced novice career, he notably won the 2016 Bavarian Open and the 2016 NRW Trophy. He debuted internationally as a junior at the Junior Grand Prix in Austria, placing 6th.

Semenenko missed the majority of the 2017–18 and 2018–19 seasons due to injury by a stress fracture in his tibia. Throughout the two seasons, he encountered struggles with his hip.

Evgeni debuted as a senior skater in the 2019–20 season, winning the silver medal at the 2020 Tallink Hotels Cup, and later winning the 2020 Russian Cup Final.

=== 2020–2021 season: World Championships debut, Junior national champion ===
Semenenko made his first appearance on the senior Grand Prix circuit at the 2020 Rostelecom Cup; placing 7th in the short program, 3rd in the free and 6th overall.

Being age eligible for both senior and junior competitions, Evgeni opted to compete at both the senior and junior national championships. He placed 11th at senior nationals, later going onto win junior nationals just two weeks after. The following month, Semenenko won the senior Russian Cup Final.

Semenenko was selected to compete at the 2021 World Championships in Sweden. The selection for the second spot at the 2021 ISU World Championships was a challenge among the federation. European Champion, Dmitri Aliev missed Russian Nationals following his COVID-19 illness and was not able to prepare for the event, while other candidates did not show consistency in competition. The Russia Cup final in February was determined as a qualifying event, and although Semenenko won ahead of Petr Gumennik and Aliev, he didn’t really expect the federation to send him to Stockholm. The Russian skating community frowned upon the idea of sending Evgeni to the World Championships due to his lack of senior international experience, especially given this years championships allowed federations to garner quotas for the upcoming 2022 Winter Olympics. A Russian official joked, “Here comes our joker!.” Despite the backlash, Evgeni competed at the championships and finished in 8th place, playing a role in securing three Olympic spots for Russian men for the first time since 2002. “I read positive, but also many negative comments on Instagram,” Evgeni shared. “I especially want to thank Misha Kolyada for cheering me up. He told me not to pay attention to what people say, just do my thing. I qualified honestly; it was fair. I deserved this trip to the World Championships.”

Semenenko competed at the 2021 World Team Trophy, helping team Russia win the gold medal.

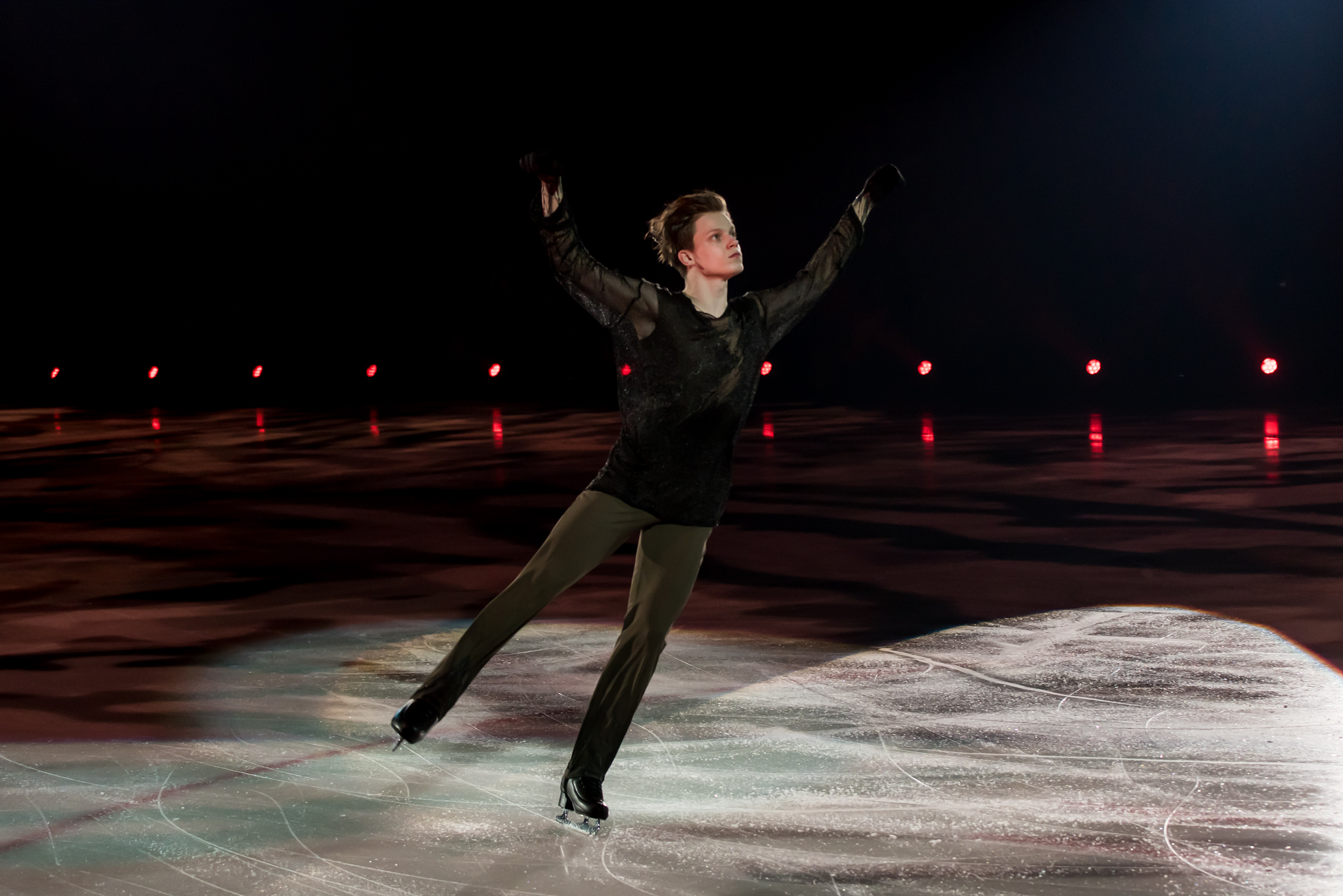
Semenenko performing in a show in 2022

=== 2021–2022 season: Beijing Olympics, Grand Prix bronze ===
Evgeni opened the Olympic season competing on the Challenger Series event, Finlandia Trophy; placing 5th. In the same month, he won his first Grand Prix medal, bronze at the 2021 Skate Canada. He later placed 6th at the Rostelecom Cup, his second Grand Prix assignment.

In December, Semenenko placed first in the short program at the 2022 Russian Nationals. However, placing 5th in the free program, he dropped to 4th place overall. He was named to the European team and named the first alternate for the Beijing Olympics.

At the 2022 European Championships, Evgeni placed 3rd in the short program, winning a small bronze medal for that segment. Placing 9th in the free program, he dropped to 5th overall.

Just a few weeks prior to the Olympic Games in Beijing, Evgeni was called up to compete due to teammate Mikhail Kolyada being forced to withdraw from the Games due to testing positive for COVID-19.

Competing at the 2022 Winter Olympics, Evgeni competed in the individual event only. He finished in 8th place overall, earning new personal best scores in the free program and overall, making him the highest placed Russian man at the games in the figure skating event.

In early March 2022, the ISU banned all figure skaters and officials from Russia and Belarus from attending the World Championships due to the Russian invasion of Ukraine in late February.

=== 2022–2023 season: National champion ===
At the 2023 Russian Championships, Evgeni won the title despite having a tie with competitor Petr Gumennik. Both athletes scored an identical total score of 295.07 points. The overall win and gold medal was given to Semenenko due to him placing higher in the free skating segment.

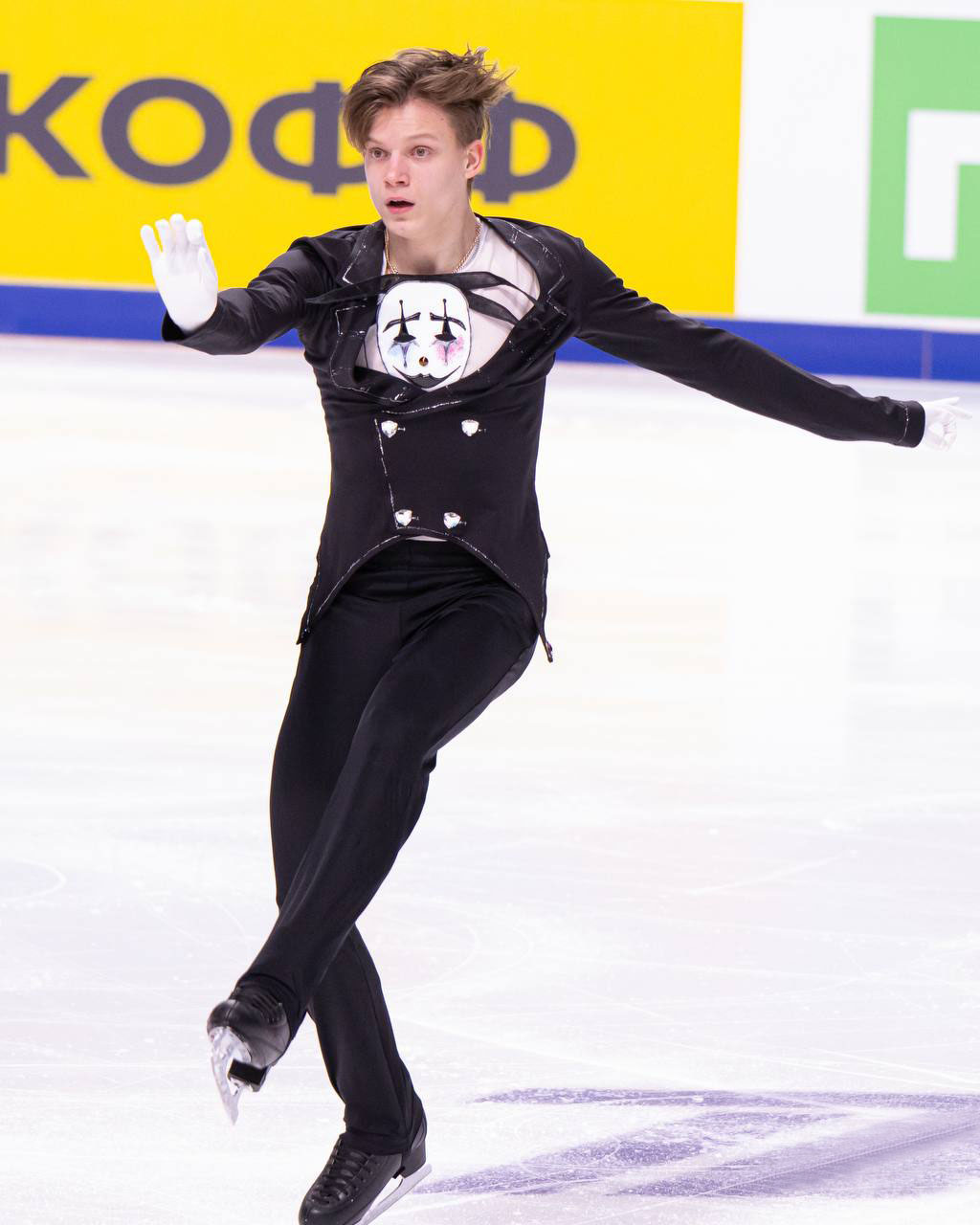
Semeneko performing his short program at the 2024 Russian Figure Skating Championships

=== 2023–2024 season: Two-time national champion ===
Semenenko won his second national title at the 2024 Championships, making him a two-time consecutive national champion. He later won the Russian Cup Final, breaking the 300 point barrier for the first time in his career.

=== 2024–2025 season ===
Semenenko placed 3rd at the 2025 Russian Nationals, taking home the bronze medal.

=== 2025–2026 season ===
Semenenko placed 2nd at the 2026 Russian Championships, winning the silver medal behind Petr Gumennik.

=== 2026–2027 season ===
On 30 June 2026, the International Skating Union announced that figure skaters from Russia and Belarus would be allowed to compete at international competitions as Individual Neutral Athletes (AINs). Each of these skaters are be required to undergo an individual assessment conducted by the ISU Council to determine whether they meet the criteria for neutral status. Semenenko's application was approved, making him eligible to compete internationally as a neutral athlete.

Semenenko made his return to the international stage at the 2026 Kinoshita Group Cup, winning the bronze medal behind Shun Sato of Japan and Vladislav Dikidzhi, also a neutral athlete. Evgeni followed this up by winning gold at the 2026 Nepela Memorial. He earned a new personal best short program and free skating score. Semenenko's first place result added him to the Grand Prix alternate list. He was later assigned to the Cup of China and Finlandia Trophy following Junhwan Cha and Andrew Torgashev's withdrawals.

In November, Semenenko competed at 2026 Cup of China where he placed third overall. “I’m really happy to be competing here,” he said. “This is my first Grand Prix event in five years, and I’m very happy that I won this bronze medal.”

On the November 17, the Figure Skating Federation of Russia announced that Russian citizens were denied entry into Finland, due to Finland's Ministry of Foreign Affairs imposing the restriction of Russian nationals into their country, despite having visas. "Finland has tightened restrictions on the entry of Russian citizens into the country. According to the information we received from the Finnish authorities, Russian athletes, including those in neutral status, do not meet the conditions for entry into Finland. This also applies to Russian athletes going on a Schengen visa to participate in the Finlandia Trophy tournament". Semenenko attempted to enter the country prior to the event and was denied entry, making him unable to compete at the 2026 Finlandia Trophy.

== Programs ==
Season	Short program	Free skating	Exhibition
2026–2027	Music Box; It's Her; Eternal Love; Last Combat (from "Dracula" soundtrack) by Danny Elfman	Tempete; Mercedes; Le Tresor by Jerome Rebotier; Kalla (from "The Count of Monte Christo" soundtrack) by Elephant Music	
2025–2026	Heart-Shaped Box; Smells Like Teen Spirit by Nirvana choreo. by Nikita Mikhailov	Gladiator; Gladiator Orchestra Suite: Part 1, The Wheat / The Battle by Hans Zimmer, Lisa Gerrard, Vienna Radio Symphony Orchestra, & Martin Gellner; Gladiator Rhapsody performed by Lang Lang; Gladiator Orchestra Suite: Part 2, Elysium by Hans Zimmer, Lisa Gerrard, Vienna Radio Symphony Orchestra, & Martin Gellner; Now We Are Free by Eliott Tordo Erhu ft. Angèle Macabiès choreo. by Daniil Gleikhengauz	Phantom by WayV
2024–2025	A Time of Quiet Between the Storms; Harvester Attack (from Dune: Part Two) by Hans Zimmer	Elegy for the Arctic; Day 2: Golden Butterflies Variation 1; Experience by Ludovico Einaudi; Clockwork by Philipp Klein	
2023–2024	Le clown by Bruno Pelletier choreo. by Nikita Mikhailov	Romeo + Juliet: Talk Show Host by Radiohead; O Verona by Craig Armstrong, Nellee Hooper and Marius de Vries; Kissing You by Des'ree; Escape from Mantua by Craig Armstrong, Nellee Hooper and Marius de Vries choreo. by Benoît Richaud	Prélude à l'après-midi d'un faune by Claude Debussy choreo. by Ilya Averbukh; Piano Concerto No. 2 by Sergei Rachmaninoff
2022–2023	Adagio in G minor by Tomaso Albinoni choreo. by Adam Solya	Trust Fund Baby; Good Boy Gone Bad by Tomorrow X Together choreo. by Ilya Averbukh	Les sans-papiers; Le pape des fous; La fête des fous (from Notre-Dame de Paris) by Riccardo Cocciante choreo. by Nikita Mikhailov; Облака-бродяги (Tramp Clouds) by Dmitry Koldun; Trust Fund Baby; Good Boy Gone Bad by Tomorrow X Together choreo. by Ilya Averbukh; Phantom by WayV choreo. by Tatiana Prokofieva and Evgeni Prisyazhny; Frost by Tomorrow X Together choreo. by Tatiana Prokofieva; Adagio in G minor by Tomaso Albinoni choreo. by Adam Solya
2021–2022	Adagio in G minor by Tomaso Albinoni choreo. by Adam Solya; What Is It About Her? (from The Wild Party) by Nadim Naaman choreo. by Nikita Mikhailov	Titles; Waltz; Love Appeared; Execution; Woland Theme (from The Master and Margarita) by Igor Kornelyuk choreo. by Nikita Mikhailov	Frost by Tomorrow X Together choreo. by Tatiana Prokofieva; Adagio in G minor by Tomaso Albinoni choreo. by Adam Solya; Eternally; Everlasting Shine by Tomorrow X Together choreo. by Florent Amodio
2020–2021	The City Which Doesn't Exist (from Bandit Petersburg) by Igor Kornelyuk choreo. by Nikita Mikhailov	Les sans-papiers; Le pape des fous; La fête des fous (from Notre-Dame de Paris) by Riccardo Cocciante choreo. by Nikita Mikhailov	Tequila by The Champs choreo. by Tatiana Prokofieva
2019–2020	Tequila by The Champs choreo. by Tatiana Prokofieva	Preliator by Globus choreo. by Tatiana Prokofieva	
2018–2019	Grande amore by II Volo choreo. by Tatiana Prokofieva	Preliator by Globus choreo. by Tatiana Prokofieva	
2017–2018	Billie Jean; Beat It by Michael Jackson choreo. by Adam Solya	Don Juan DeMarco by Michael Kamen choreo. by Nikita Mikhailov	

== Competitive highlights ==
- GP – Event of the ISU Grand Prix Series
- JGP – Event of the ISU Junior Grand Prix Series
- CS – Event of the ISU Challenger Series
- TBD – Assigned
- WD – Withdrew from event
- Medals at team events are awarded for the team results only. Individual placements at team events are listed in parentheses.

=== Skating as an Individual Neutral Athlete ===
Competition placements at senior level
Season	2026–27
GP Cup of China	3rd
CS Kinoshita Group Cup	3rd
CS Nepela Memorial	1st

=== Skating for Russia ===
Competition placements at senior level
Season	2019–20	2020–21	2021–22	2022-23	2023-24	2024-25	2025-26	2026-27
Winter Olympics			8th					
World Championships		8th						
European Championships			5th					
Russian Championships		11th	4th	1st	1st	3rd	2nd	
Russian Cup Finals (Note: The 2023 Russian Cup Final was renamed as the 2023 Russian Grand Prix Final.)		1st		4th	1st	3rd		
World Team Trophy		1st (5th)						
GP Rostelecom Cup		6th	6th					
GP Skate Canada			3rd					
CS Cup Of Austria			WD					
CS Finlandia Trophy			5th					
Ice Star		3rd						
Tallink Hotels Cup	1st							

Competition placements at junior level
Season	2014–15	2015–16	2016-17	2017-18	2018-19	2019-20	2020-21
Russian Championships	16th	7th	10th			5th	1st
Russian Cup Finals			2nd		WD	1st	
JGP Austria				6th			

== Detailed results ==
ISU personal best scores in the +5/-5 GOE System
Segment	Type	Score	Event
Total	**TSS**	**292.09**	2026 CS Nepela Memorial
Short program	**TSS**	**101.16**	2026 CS Nepela Memorial
Short program	TES	60.74	2026 CS Nepela Memorial
Short program	PCS	42.71	2022 European Championships
Free skating	**TSS**	**190.93**	2026 CS Nepela Memorial
Free skating	TES	108.85	2026 CS Nepela Memorial
Free skating	PCS	85.44	2022 European Championships

=== Senior level ===
- Small medals for the short program and free skating are only awarded at ISU Championships.
- Medals at team events are awarded for the team results only. Individual placements at team events are listed in parentheses.
- ISU Personal Bests highlighted in **bold**

=== Skating as an Individual Neutral Athlete ===
Results in the 2026–27 season
Date	Event	SP		FS		Total	
Date	Event	P	Score	P	Score	P	Score
Sept 4 – 6, 2026	(Japan) 2026 CS Kinoshita Group Cup	6	74.41	2	178.89	3	253.30
Sept 24 – 27, 2026	(Slovakia) 2026 CS Nepela Memorial	1	**101.16**	1	**190.93**	1	**292.09**
Nov 6–8, 2026	2026 Cup of China	3	99.72	3	181.90	3	281.62

=== Skating for Russia ===
Results in the 2020–21 season
Date	Event	SP		FS		Total	
Date	Event	P	Score	P	Score	P	Score
Oct 10 – 13, 2020	(Russia) 2020 Russian Cup Stage II, Moscow	1	85.83	4	163.22	4	249.05
Oct 29 – Nov 1, 2020	(Belarus) 2020 Ice Star	3	77.42	3	153.26	3	230.68
Nov 8 – 12, 2020	(Russia) 2020 Russian Cup Stage IV, Kazan	1	96.00	2	168.38	1	264.38
Nov 20 – 22, 2020	(Russia) 2020 Rostelecom Cup	7	83.42	3	177.36	6	260.78
Dec 23 – 27, 2020	(Russia) 2021 Russian Championships	11	79.86	12	148.61	11	228.47
Feb 26 – Mar 2, 2021	(Russia) 2021 Russian Cup Final	1	94.95	2	170.18	1	265.13
Mar 22 – 28, 2021	(Sweden) 2021 World Championships	10	86.86	7	171.59	8	258.45
Apr 15 – 18, 2021	(Japan) 2021 World Team Trophy	7	88.86	5	166.33	1 (5)	255.19

Results in the 2021–22 season
Date	Event	SP		FS		Total	
Date	Event	P	Score	P	Score	P	Score
Oct 7 – 10, 2021	(Finland) 2021 CS Finlandia Trophy	11	69.63	3	172.60	5	242.23
Oct 29 – 31, 2021	2021 Skate Canada International	5	87.71	2	168.30	3	256.01
Nov 26 – 28, 2021	(Russia) 2021 Rostelecom Cup	7	81.00	6	165.66	6	246.66
Dec 21 – 26, 2021	(Russia) 2022 Russian Championships	1	98.03	5	176.25	4	274.28
Jan 10 – 16, 2022	(Estonia) 2022 European Championships	3	99.04	9	160.96	5	260.00
Feb 8 – 10, 2022	(China) 2022 Winter Olympics	7	95.76	9	178.37	8	274.13
Mar 25 – 27, 2022	(Russia) 2022 Channel One Trophy	2	101.55	5	177.02	2 (4)	278.57

Results in the 2022–23 season
Date	Event	SP		FS		Total	
Date	Event	P	Score	P	Score	P	Score
Nov 8 – 14, 2022	(Russia) 2022 Russian Grand Prix Stage IV, Moscow	3	88.75	2	183.93	2	272.68
Nov 8 – 12, 2020	(Russia) 2022 Russian Grand Prix Stage VI, Perm	1	103.36	1	189.63	1	292.99
Dec 20 – 25, 2022	(Russia) 2023 Russian Championships	2	99.15	1	195.92	1	295.07
Mar 1 – 4 2023	(Russia) 2023 Russian Grand Prix Final	4	95.48	4	177.21	4	272.69

Results in the 2023–24 season
Date	Event	SP		FS		Total	
Date	Event	P	Score	P	Score	P	Score
Oct 10 – 16, 2023	(Russia) 2023 Russian Grand Prix Stage I, Ufa	2	97.74	1	191.63	1	289.37
Nov 8 – 13, 2023	(Russia) 2023 Russian Grand Prix Stage IV, Kazan	1	98.54	3	167.70	2	266.24
Dec 20 –24, 2023	(Russia) 2024 Russian Championships	1	101.19	2	193.56	1	294.75
Feb 14 – 18, 2024	(Russia) 2024 Russian Grand Prix Final	1	104.84	1	199.56	1	304.40

Results in the 2024–25 season
Date	Event	SP		FS		Total	
Date	Event	P	Score	P	Score	P	Score
Oct 23 – 28, 2024	(Russia) 2024 Russian Grand Prix Stage I, Magnitogorsk	5	87.35	2	187.62	3	274.97
Nov 13 – 18, 2024	(Russia) 2024 Russian Grand Prix Stage IV, Moscow	1	106.74	2	194.86	1	301.60
Dec 18 – 22, 2024	(Russia) 2025 Russian Championships	9	90.93	2	199.72	3	281.65
Feb 13 – 17 2025	(Russia) 2025 Russian Grand Prix Final	3	100.49	2	193.41	3	293.90

Results in the 2025–26 season
Date	Event	SP		FS		Total	
Date	Event	P	Score	P	Score	P	Score
Dec 17 – 21, 2025	(Russia) 2026 Russian Championships	2	100.99	2	195.81	2	296.80

=== Junior level ===
Results in the 2016–17 season
Date	Event	SP		FS		Total	
Date	Event	P	Score	P	Score	P	Score
Feb 1 – 5, 2017	(Russia) 2017 Russian Junior Championships	9	69.27	11	134.33	10	203.60
Feb 12 – 16, 2017	(Russia) 2017 Russian Cup Final	6	74.02	2	144.88	2	218.90

Results in the 2017–18 season
Date	Event	SP		FS		Total	
Date	Event	P	Score	P	Score	P	Score
Aug 30 – Sep 02, 2017	2017 JGP Austria	11	55.60	5	120.20	6	175.80

Results in the 2019–20 season
Date	Event	SP		FS		Total	
Date	Event	P	Score	P	Score	P	Score
Feb 4 – 8, 2020	(Russia) 2020 Russian Junior Championships	5	80.36	4	156.82	5	237.18
