= Oona Brown =

American ice dancer (born 2004)

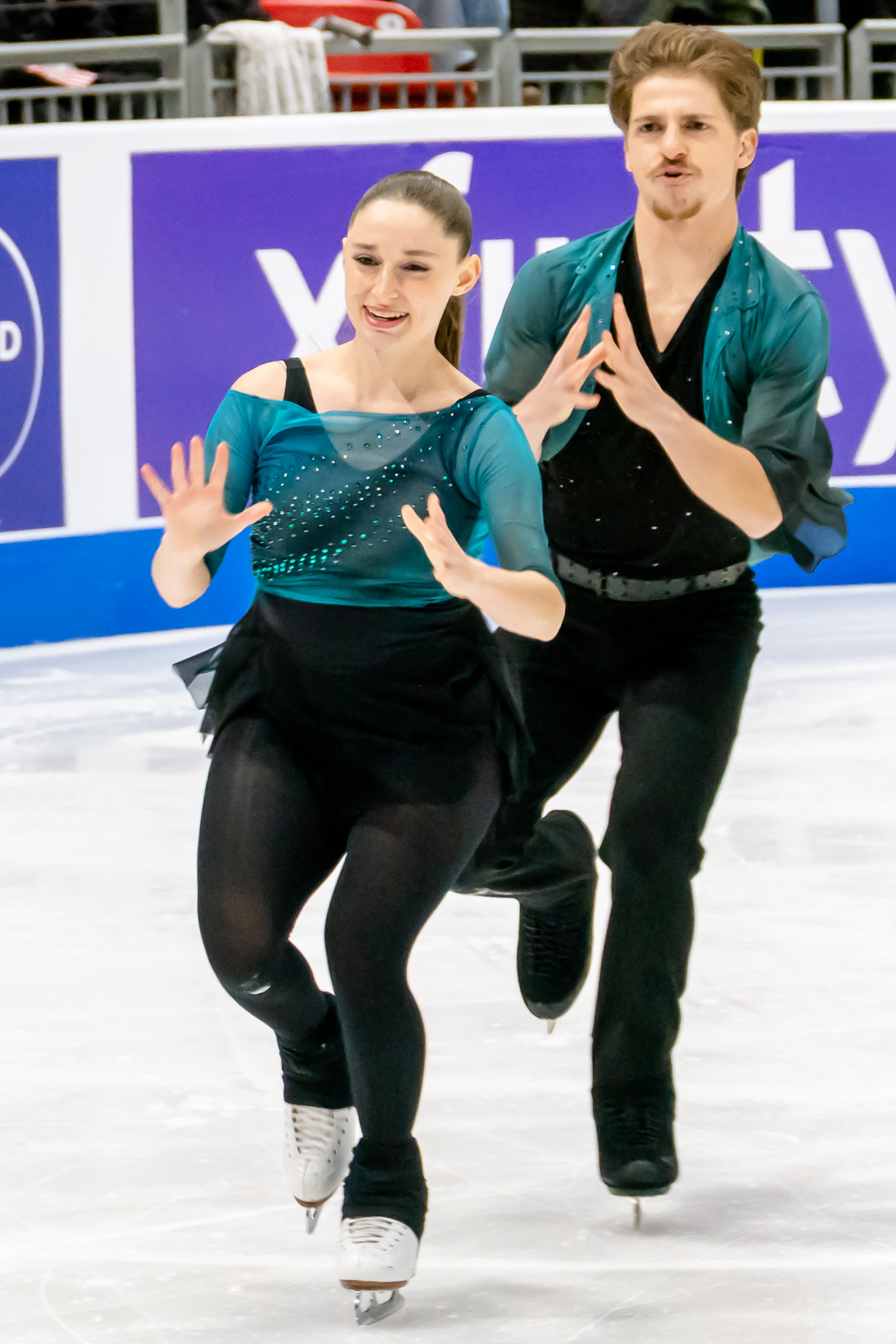
- Oona Brown and Gage Brown at 2025 Skate America

Personal information
- Born: September 10, 2004 (age 22) Greenport, New York, U.S.
- Height: 4 ft 10 in (1.47 m)

Figure skating career
- Country: United States
- Discipline: Ice dance
- Partner: Gage Brown
- Coach: Inese Bucevica; Joel Dear; Romain Haguenauer; Patrice Lauzon; Samuel Chouinard
- Skating club: Skating Club of New York
- Began skating: 2008

Medal record
Four Continents Championships
Bronze medal – third place	2026 Beijing	Ice dance
World Junior Championships
Gold medal – first place	2022 Tallinn	Ice dance

Oona Brown (born September 10, 2004) is an American ice dancer. Competing with her brother, Gage Brown, she is the 2026 Four Continents bronze medalist and 2026 Finlandia Trophy bronze medalist.

On the junior level, she is the 2022 World Junior champion, two-time ISU Junior Grand Prix medalist, and a three-time U.S. national junior medalist (2021 silver, 2020 bronze, 2019 pewter).

== Personal life ==
Oona Brown was born on September 10, 2004, in Greenport, New York. Her parents are Zhon Brown and Louis DeVirgilio. She has six siblings: Gage, who is her ice dance partner; Adira; Rowan; Tristan; Liam; and Morgant.

She and Gage were previously home-schooled.

Brown plays the drums and piano and plays the snare in two Irish marching bands. She also enjoys gardening, running, knitting, reading, and refereeing soccer.

== Career ==
=== Early career ===
Oona Brown started skating at age 4. She and her brother, Gage, were paired up as an ice dance team in 2016. At the intermediate level, they placed 4th at their first Eastern Sectionals, and 12th at the 2017 U.S. championships. They moved up to the novice level for the 2017–18 season, placing 1st their next sectional championships, and 5th 2018 U.S. championships. They made their international debut at the 2018 Bavarian Open, where they competed in the advanced novice competition and placed 3rd.

=== 2018–19 season: Junior international debut ===
For the 2018–19 season, the Browns moved up to the junior level. They made their Junior Grand Prix debut at the 2018 JGP Lithuania, where they placed 9th. They placed 8th at the 2018 JGP Armenia, and won silver at the 2018 Eastern Sectionals. They advanced to the 2019 U.S. championships, where they placed 4th at the junior level and won the pewter medal.

=== 2019–20 season ===
The Browns began the 2019–20 season at the 2019 Lake Placid Ice Dance International, where they placed 4th. For the 2019-20 Junior Grand Prix they were assigned to the 2019 JGP Russia and 2019 JGP Italy, where they placed 8th and 5th respectively. They went on to place 4th at the 2020 Ice Dance Final, and qualified for the 2020 U.S. championships where they won the bronze medal. They were named to the 2020 World Junior Championships team, where they placed 11th in the rhythm dance and 9th in the free dance, finishing 10th overall.

=== 2020–21 season ===
Due to the COVID-19 pandemic, most of the major international events for juniors during 2020–21 were canceled; this included the 2020–21 Junior Grand Prix.

In December, the Browns debuted their new free dance to Australian singer Marlisa's cover of Metallica's Nothing Else Matters, filmed by On Ice Perspectives, a skating cinematography company created by former U.S. skater, Jordan Cowan. The free dance was performed at Bryant Park, and was uploaded to the On Ice Perspectives YouTube channel. It quickly gained popularity and surpassed one-million views within its first week.

In September, the USFSA held the virtual ISP (International Selection Pool) Points Challenge, which allowed skaters to be judged by ISU-level judges. The competition was used to give skaters byes to Nationals, which would usually be obtained through the Grand Prix series, and will also be used in the selection process for future international events. The Browns placed second overall in the junior event and qualified for the 2021 U.S. Championships.

=== 2021–22 season: World Junior champion and Junior Grand Prix gold and silver ===
With the resumption of international junior competition on the Junior Grand Prix, the Browns were assigned to compete at the second stage of the French JGP in Courchevel. They placed second in the short program, narrowly behind the second American team present, Flores/Tsarevski, but won the free dance to take the gold medal, their first JGP medal. At their second event, the 2021 JGP Austria in Linz, the Browns were second in the rhythm dance. Oona Brown fell on her twizzle sequence in the free dance; as a result, they were fifth in that segment but narrowly took the silver medal overall. These results qualified them for the Junior Grand Prix Final, to be held in Osaka, but this was canceled as a result of restrictions prompted by the Omicron variant.

Oona tested positive for COVID-19 in early January, as a result of which they were forced to withdraw from the 2022 U.S. Junior Championships. Despite this setback, they were named to the American team for the 2022 World Junior Championships, with Gage vowing that "we're going to put absolutely everything into this" after the many missed competitions as a result of the pandemic.

The World Junior Championships were originally to be held in Sofia, but were delayed from their traditional early March to mid-April in order to accommodate a move to Tallinn because of pandemic restrictions. Due to the invasion of Ukraine, all Russian and Belarusian skaters were banned from attending. The Browns scored a new personal best in the rhythm dance, freedance, and total score. Ted Barton said, "They did not look like leaders coming into the free[dance] and hoping to win; they had to earn it, so they didn't hold anything back. [They] just pushed all the way through it." Gage said "the last time we competed was in October. Just to get actually out here and compete was an amazing feeling. We missed that feeling for six months." They won the free dance as well to take the gold medal.

=== 2022–23 season: Senior international debut ===
While the siblings had been debating for some time whether to remain at the junior level or move up to the senior ranks following their Junior World title, they decided to do the latter, with Gage calling it "the turning point for us, and it was great that it ended the way it did." They made their senior international debut on the Challenger circuit, finishing fifth at both the 2022 CS Nepela Memorial and the 2022 CS Budapest Trophy. The Browns were then invited to make their Grand Prix debut at the 2022 MK John Wilson Trophy, where they placed seventh. They were eighth at the 2022 Grand Prix of Espoo.

In their senior national championship debut, the Browns finished ninth at the 2023 U.S. Championships.

=== 2023–24 season ===
Following the 2023 national championships, the Browns began working with coaches at the Ice Academy of Montreal in February of that year. While remaining based primarily in New York, they traveled to Montreal periodically for additional assistance. The siblings cited Guillaume Cizeron and Zachary Donohue as people they valued the chance to collaborate with. After winning the silver medal at the Lake Placid Ice Dance International, the Browns finished seventh at the 2023 Finlandia Trophy.

Initially with only one assignment on the Grand Prix, they were added to the 2023 Skate America as well before the series commenced. They finished seventh there, setting a new personal best total score (177.21). They fared better at their second assignment the following weekend, finishing fourth overall at the 2023 Skate Canada International with another new personal best score (187.62). Gage stated that the back-to-back competitions had been "tricky", but that "we know now that we can do it and we are ready to do it again in the future."

The Browns subsequently closed the season by finishing eighth at the 2024 U.S. Championships.

=== 2024–25 season ===
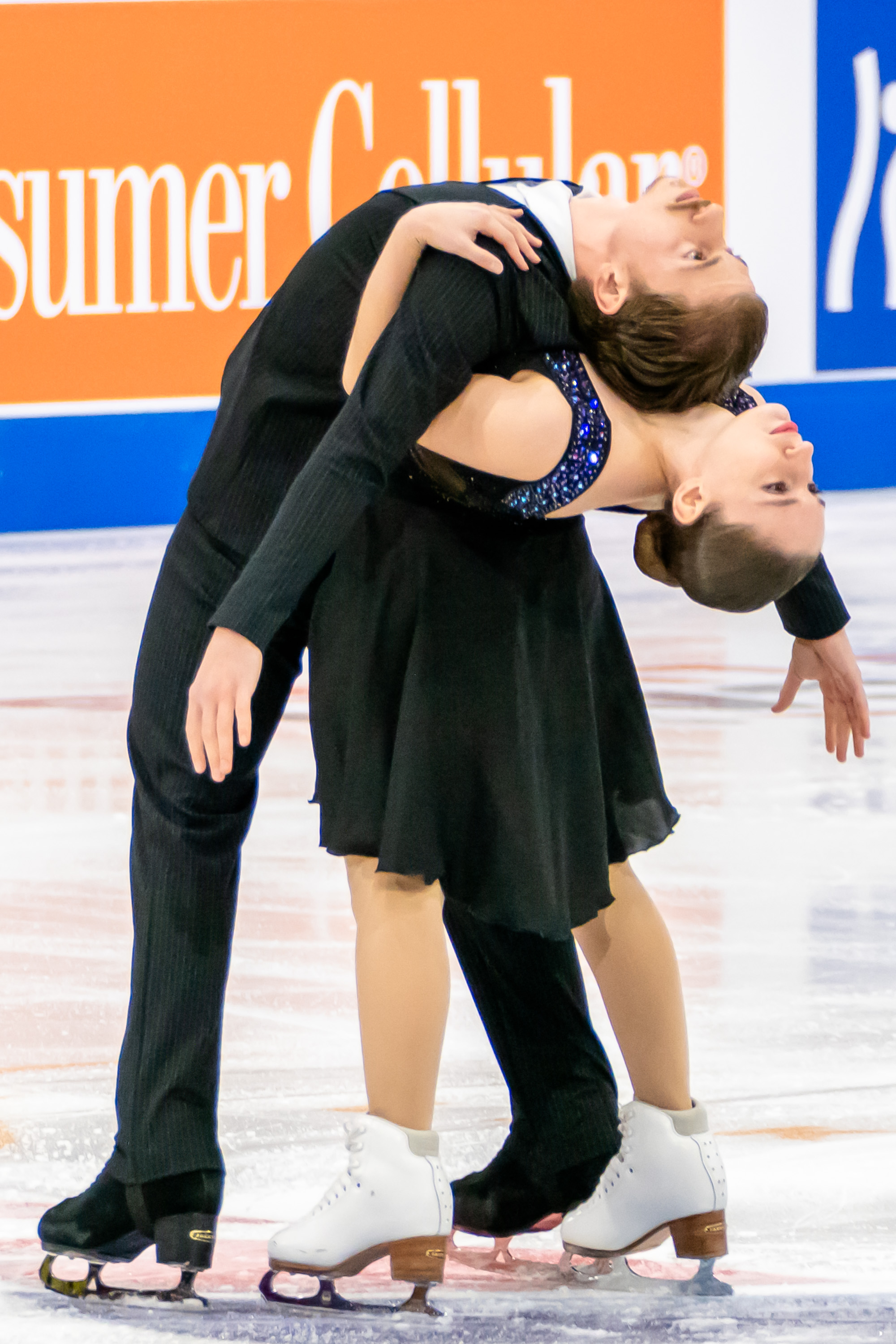
The Browns performing their free dance at 2025 Skate America

The Browns started the season by winning silver medals at the 2024 Lake Placid Ice Dance International and the 2024 Denis Ten Memorial Challenge. Going on to compete on the 2024–25 Grand Prix circuit, they finished sixth at the 2024 Skate Canada International and eighth at the 2024 Finlandia Trophy. They subsequently took gold at the 2024 Santa Claus Cup.

They finished the season with a fifth-place finish at the 2025 U.S. Championships.

=== 2025–26 season: Four Continents bronze medal ===
The Browns began the season by winning gold at the 2025 Lake Placid Ice Dance International and winning silver at the 2025 CS Denis Ten Memorial Challenge. They then competed on the 2025–26 Grand Prix series, placing sixth at 2025 Skate America and ninth at the 2025 Finlandia Trophy. In December, they finished fourth at the 2025 CS Golden Spin of Zagreb.

The following month, the Browns competed at the 2026 U.S. Championships, finishing in sixth place. They were subsequently named to the 2026 Four Continents team.

Less than two weeks later, the Browns earned the bronze medal at the 2026 Four Continents Championships in their debut at this event. "We were very happy for our first Four Continents to have a place on the podium and we’re really proud of the two programs that we put out," said Oona. "Going into the free dance we were a little nervous, but we fought through that and so we’re super happy with the result."

=== 2026–27 season: First Grand Prix medal ===
The Browns opened their season by winning bronze at the 2026 CS Nepela Memorial. They then finished fourth at the 2026 Skate Canada International and won bronze at the 2026 Finlandia Trophy, their first ever ISU Grand Prix medal. “I think this might be the first time in our five visits to Finland that we’ve delivered two clean performances,” said Oona Brown.

== Programs ==
=== Ice dance with Gage Brown ===
Season	Rhythm dance	Free dance	Exhibition	Ref.
2018–19	La cumparsita Performed by Milva By Gerardo Matos Rodríguez; Tangled Up By Caro Emerald	Still Got the Blues; Parisienne Walkways By Gary Moore	—N/a	
2019–20	When I Get My Name in Lights; Everything Old is New Again From The Boy from Oz	Bloodstream By Tokio Myers; Air Performed by Jan Werner By Johann Sebastian Bach	—N/a	
2020–21	When I Get My Name in Lights; Everything Old is New Again From The Boy from Oz	Nothing Else Matters Performed by Marlisa By Metallica	—N/a	
2021–22	How Ya Like Me Now By Kool Moe Dee Arranged by Hugo Chouinard	Exogenesis: Symphony Part 1: Overture; I Belong to You By Muse Arranged by Hugo Chouinard	—N/a	
2022–23	Bones By Imagine Dragons, Tony Evans and His Orchestra & Gnarls Barkley Choreo. by Inese Bucevica & Joel Dear	Big Sky By Annie Lennox; No Good Place for the Lonely By Joe Bonamassa Choreo. by Inese Bucevica & Joel Dear	—N/a	
2023–24	This Town; Satellite; I'm Still Standing By Elton John Arranged by Hugo Chouinard Choreo. by Inese Bucevica, Joel Dear, Romain Haguenauer & Patrice Lauzon	All by Myself By Eric Carmen & Sergei Rachmaninoff Arranged by Hugo Chouinard Choreo. by Inese Bucevica, Joel Dear, Romain Haguenauer & Patrice Lauzon	How Ya Like Me Now By Kool Moe Dee; I Got The By Labi Siffre	
2024–25	Get Up Offa That Thing By James Brown Choreo. by Inese Bucevica, Joel Dear, Romain Haguenauer & Patrice Lauzon	Baba O'Riley By The Who Choreo. by Inese Bucevica, Joel Dear, Romain Haguenauer & Patrice Lauzon	This Town; Satellite; I'm Still Standing By Elton John Arranged by Hugo Chouinard Choreo. by Inese Bucevica, Joel Dear, Romain Haguenauer & Patrice Lauzon	
2025–26	Jump Around By House of Pain Arranged by Hugo Chouinard Choreo. by Inese Bucevica, Joel Dear, Samuel Chouinard & Romain Haguenauer	The Godfather By Nino Rota & Carlo Savina Choreo. by Inese Bucevica, Joel Dear, Samuel Chouinard & Romain Haguenauer	Get Up Offa That Thing By James Brown Choreo. by Inese Bucevica, Joel Dear, Romain Haguenauer & Patrice Lauzon	
2026–27	Only the Good Die Young, Piano Man, It's Still Rock and Roll to Me By Billy Joel	Selections from The Queen's Gambit soundtrack		

== Competitive highlights ==
=== Ice dance with Gage Brown ===
- GP – Event of the ISU Grand Prix Series
- JGP – Event of the ISU Junior Grand Prix Series
- CS – Event of the ISU Challenger Series
- TBD – Assigned
- WD – Withdrew from competition

Competition placements at senior level
Season	2022–23	2023–24	2024–25	2025–26	2026–27
Four Continents Championships				3rd	
U.S. Championships	9th	8th	5th	6th	
GP Finland	8th		8th	9th	3rd
GP Skate America		7th		6th	
GP Skate Canada		4th	6th		4th
GP Wilson Trophy	7th				
CS Budapest Trophy	5th				
CS Denis Ten Memorial			2nd	2nd	
CS Finlandia Trophy		7th			
CS Golden Spin of Zagreb				4th	
CS Nepela Memorial	5th				3rd
Lake Placid Ice Dance		2nd	2nd	1st	
Santa Claus Cup			1st		

Competition placements at junior level
Season	2018–19	2019–20	2020–21	2021–22
World Junior Championships		10th		1st
U.S. Championships	4th	3rd	2nd	
JGP Armenia	8th			
JGP Austria				2nd
JGP France				1st
JGP Italy		5th		
JGP Lithuania	9th			
JGP Russia		7th		
Bavarian Open		4th		
Lake Placid Ice Dance		4th		

== Detailed results ==
=== Ice dance with Gage Brown ===
ISU personal best scores in the +5/-5 GOE System
Segment	Type	Score	Event
Total	TSS	190.81	2026 CS Nepela Memorial
Rhythm dance	TSS	76.59	2026 CS Nepela Memorial
Rhythm dance	TES	42.94	2026 CS Nepela Memorial
Rhythm dance	PCS	33.65	2026 CS Nepela Memorial
Free dance	TSS	116.54	2026 Four Continents Championship
Free dance	TES	66.20	2026 Four Continents Championship
Free dance	PCS	51.90	2026 CS Nepela Memorial

==== Senior level ====
Results in the 2022–23 season
Date	Event	RD		FD		Total	
Date	Event	P	Score	P	Score	P	Score
Sep 29 – Oct 1, 2022	(Slovakia) 2022 CS Nepela Memorial	6	59.48	5	101.14	5	160.62
Oct 13–16, 2022	(Hungary) 2022 CS Budapest Trophy	5	62.94	4	103.39	5	166.33
Nov 11–13, 2022	(United Kingdom) 2022 MK John Wilson Trophy	7	70.34	7	103.40	7	173.74
Nov 25–27, 2022	(Finland) 2022 Grand Prix of Espoo	9	65.71	8	100.99	8	166.70
Jan 23–29, 2023	(United States) 2023 U.S. Championships	9	72.80	8	109.09	9	181.89

Results in the 2023–24 season
Date	Event	RD		FD		Total	
Date	Event	P	Score	P	Score	P	Score
Aug 1–2, 2023	(United States) 2023 Lake Placid Ice Dance International	1	75.26	2	105.40	2	180.66
Oct 4–8, 2023	(Finland) 2023 CS Finlandia Trophy	5	67.98	5	106.49	7	174.47
Oct 20–22, 2023	(United States) 2023 Skate America	7	71.34	7	105.87	7	177.21
Oct 27–29, 2023	2023 Skate Canada International	4	73.91	4	113.71	4	187.62
Jan 22–28, 2024	(United States) 2024 U.S. Championships	6	76.44	9	102.99	8	179.43

Results in the 2024–25 season
Date	Event	RD		FD		Total	
Date	Event	P	Score	P	Score	P	Score
July 30–31, 2024	(United States) 2024 Lake Placid Ice Dance International	2	74.68	3	111.33	2	186.01
Oct 2–5, 2024	(Kazakhstan) 2024 CS Denis Ten Memorial Challenge	3	73.01	2	113.95	2	186.96
Oct 25–27, 2024	2024 Skate Canada International	6	72.18	6	106.96	6	179.14
Nov 15–17, 2024	(Finland) 2024 Finlandia Trophy	5	73.35	9	103.22	8	176.57
Nov 27 – Dec 2, 2024	(Hungary) 2024 Santa Claus Cup	1	75.86	1	114.22	1	190.08
Jan 20–26, 2025	(United States) 2025 U.S. Championships	5	77.38	6	115.99	5	193.37

Results in the 2025–26 season
Date	Event	RD		FD		Total	
Date	Event	P	Score	P	Score	P	Score
July 29–31, 2025	(United States) 2025 Lake Placid Ice Dance International	1	75.77	2	111.71	1	187.48
Oct 1–4, 2025	(Kazakhstan) 2025 CS Denis Ten Memorial Challenge	2	73.91	4	104.95	2	178.86
Nov 14–16, 2025	(United States) 2025 Skate America	7	70.25	6	111.86	6	182.11
Nov 21–23, 2025	(Finland) 2025 Finlandia Trophy	9	64.21	8	106.26	9	170.47
Dec 3–6, 2025	(Croatia) 2025 CS Golden Spin of Zagreb	4	70.01	3	110.29	4	180.30
Jan 4–11, 2026	(United States) 2026 U.S. Championships	6	75.72	5	118.59	6	194.31
Jan 21–25, 2026	(China) 2026 Four Continents Championships	3	74.24	2	116.54	3	190.78

Results in the 2026–27 season
Date	Event	RD		FD		Total	
Date	Event	P	Score	P	Score	P	Score
Sep 24–27, 2026	(Slovakia) 2026 CS Nepela Memorial	2	76.59	3	114.22	3	190.81
Oct 30 – Nov 1, 2026	2026 Skate Canada International	4	72.69	4	111.03	4	183.72
Nov 20–21, 2026	(Finland) 2026 Finlandia Trophy	4	76.22	3	111.75	3	187.97

==== Junior level ====
- Small medals for the short program and free skating are only awarded at ISU Championships.
- At national events in the United States, pewter medals are awarded for fourth place.

Results in the 2018–19 season
Date	Event	RD		FD		Total	
Date	Event	P	Score	P	Score	P	Score
Sep 5–8, 2018	2018 JGP Lithuania	5	55.47	12	69.28	9	124.75
Oct 10–13, 2018	2018 JGP Armenia	6	55.48	9	78.35	8	133.83
Jan 18–27, 2019	(United States) 2019 U.S. Championships (Junior)	3	63.34	4	90.33	4	153.67

Results in the 2019–20 season
Date	Event	RD		FD		Total	
Date	Event	P	Score	P	Score	P	Score
Jul 30 – Aug 2, 2019	(United States) 2019 Lake Placid Ice Dance International	5	53.66	4	79.30	4	153.47
Sep 11–14, 2019	2019 JGP Russia	8	52.45	6	88.88	7	141.33
Oct 2–5, 2019	2019 JGP Italy	8	54.81	2	91.34	5	146.15
Jan 20–26, 2020	(United States) 2020 U.S. Championships (Junior)	3	64.91	3	95.63	3	160.54
Feb 3–9, 2020	(Germany) 2020 Bavarian Open	4	59.90	4	91.16	4	151.06
Mar 2–8, 2020	(Estonia) 2020 World Junior Championships	11	59.50	9	92.55	10	152.05

Results in the 2020–21 season
Date	Event	RD		FD		Total	
Date	Event	P	Score	P	Score	P	Score
Jan 11–21, 2021	(United States) 2021 U.S. Championships (Junior)	2	66.20	2	96.71	2	162.91

Results in the 2021–22 season
Date	Event	RD		FD		Total	
Date	Event	P	Score	P	Score	P	Score
Aug 25–28, 2021	2021 JGP France II	2	59.79	1	94.46	1	154.25
Oct 6–9, 2021	2021 JGP Austria	2	63.70	5	89.04	2	152.74
Apr 13–17, 2022	(Estonia) 2022 World Junior Championships	1	66.98	1	103.27	1	170.25
