= Anastasia Grebenkina =

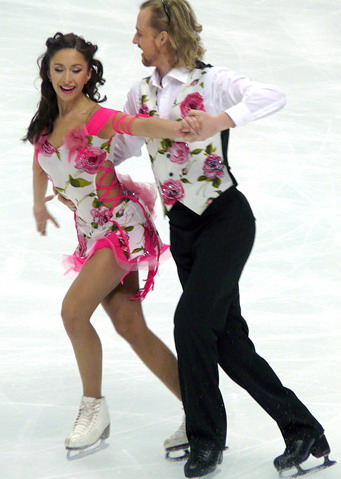

Personal information
- Full name: Anastasia Yuryevna Grebenkina
- Born: 18 January 1979 (age 47) Moscow, Russian SFSR, Soviet Union
- Height: 1.70 m (5 ft 7 in)

Figure skating career
- Country: Armenia; Russia; Latvia
- Began skating: 1985
- Retired: 2008

Anastasia Yuryevna Grebenkina (Russian: Анастасия Юрьевна Гребёнкина, born 18 January 1979) is a former competitive ice dancer. She is best known for her partnership with Vazgen Azrojan with whom she represented Armenia at the 2006 Winter Olympics and won the bronze medal at the 2005 NHK Trophy.

== Career ==
Grebenkina teamed up with Vazgen Azrojan in 1996 and skated with him until 1998, representing Russia. After their partnership ended, she skated with Vitali Novikov, also representing Russia.

Grebenkina and Azrojan reformed their partnership in 2002, this time representing Armenia. They became the first skaters to medal for Armenia at a Grand Prix event, obtaining bronze at the NHK Trophy in 2005. They competed at the 2006 Winter Olympics, finishing 20th.

In September 2006, Grebenkina / Azrojan changed coaches, moving from Alexei Gorshkov to Alexander Zhulin. At the 2006 Cup of China, Grebenkina cut her leg with her own blade during practice, requiring stitches, but was able to compete and finished 6th with Azrojan. The duo retired from competition in 2008. She coaches at Moscow's Gorky Park.

In 2007, Grebenkina played Maria Feodorovna in a Russian television movie, Звезда Империи.

== Personal life ==
Grebenkina is married to Yuri Goncharov, with whom she has a son, Ivan, who was born on May 25, 2010. Anna Semenovich is the godmother.

== Programs ==
(with Azroyan)

Season	Original dance	Free dance
2007–2008	Artsakh by Ara Gevorgyan	Godfather by Nino Rota
2006–2007	El Sol Sueno by Jerzy Petersburski; Libertango by Astor Piazzolla	Air by Johann Sebastian Bach
2005–2006	Samba: Ritmo de Bom Bom by Vim; Rhumba: Bésame Mucho by Sunny Skylar, Consuelo Velazquez; Samba: Ritmo de Bom Bom by Vim	Worshipping Govinda by George Harrison
2004–2005	Quickstep: No Me Voy Sin Bailar; Slow foxtrot; Quickstep: No Me Voy Sin Bailar	Symphony No. 25 by Mozart; Music by P. Glass; Symphony No. 25 by Mozart
2003–2004	Blues; Swing	Ani (Armenian Selections) by Ara Gevorkian
2002–2003	March: Persicher Marsch (Persian March) op. 289 by Johann Strauss II; Waltz: Drinking Song (from La Traviata) by Giuseppe Verdi	Scandinavian Dances

== Competitive highlights ==
GP: Grand Prix

=== With Azrojan for Armenia and Russia ===
International
Event	96–97 (RUS)	97–98 (RUS)	02–03 (ARM)	03–04 (ARM)	04–05 (ARM)	05–06 (ARM)	06–07 (ARM)	07–08 (ARM)
Winter Olympics						20th		
World Champ.			24th	19th	17th	WD	22nd	
European Champ.				13th	11th	14th	14th	WD
GP Bompard				9th		9th	9th	6th
GP Cup of China					8th		6th	
GP Cup of Russia								6th
GP NHK Trophy						3rd		
Schäfer Memorial				1st		6th		
Nebelhorn Trophy				WD				
Nepela Memorial								3rd
Skate Israel						3rd		
Golden Spin	3rd	2nd						
Skate Israel		4th						
PFSA Trophy	4th							
National
Russian Champ.	4th	6th						
WD = Withdrew

=== With Novikov for Russia ===
International
Event	1999–2000	2000–2001
GP Skate America		9th
Nebelhorn Trophy		6th
Skate Israel	7th	
National
Russian Championships	5th	8th

=== With Samovich for Latvia ===
Event	1993–94
World Championships	29th
Latvian Championships	1st
