= Vazgen Azrojan =

Armenian ice dancer (born 1977)

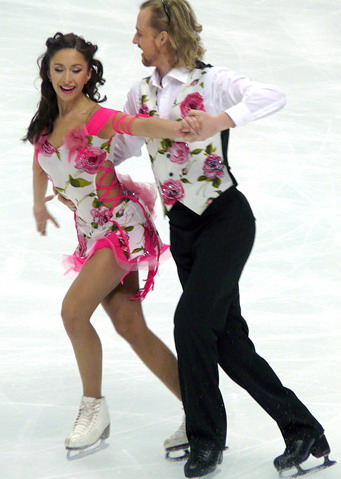
- Vazgen Azrojan with Anastasia Grebenkina.

Personal information
- Born: 22 January 1977 (age 49) Odessa, Ukrainian SSR, Soviet Union
- Height: 1.83 m (6 ft 0 in)

Figure skating career
- Country: Armenia; Russia
- Began skating: 1982
- Retired: 2008

Vazgen Azrojan (Armenian: Վազգեն Ազրոջան; born 22 January 1977) is a retired Armenian ice dancer. He is best known for his partnership with Anastasia Grebenkina with whom he represented Armenia at the 2006 Winter Olympics and won the bronze medal at the 2005 NHK Trophy.

== Personal life ==
He was born on 22 January 1977 in Odessa, Ukrainian SSR. He is the father of Armenian ice dancer Viktoriia Azroian (born 15 July 2003 in Moscow).

== Career ==
Azrojan placed ninth with Ekaterina Davydova at the 1994 World Junior Championships, representing Russia. The next season, he competed with Elena Kustarova for Russia and placed 17th at the 1995 European Championships.

Azrojan teamed up with Anastasia Grebenkina in 1996 and skated with her until 1998, representing Russia. After their partnership ended, he skated with Tiffany Hyden, representing Armenia.

Grebenkina and Azrojan reformed their partnership in 2002 to compete for Armenia. They became the first skaters to medal for Armenia at a Grand Prix event, obtaining bronze at the NHK Trophy in 2005. They competed at the 2006 Winter Olympics, finishing 20th. Azrojan was the flag bearer for Armenia at the event.

In September 2006, Grebenkina / Azrojan changed coaches, moving from Alexei Gorshkov to Alexander Zhulin. At the 2006 Cup of China, Grebenkina cut her leg with her own blade during practice, requiring stitches, but was able to compete and finished 6th with Azrojan. The duo retired from competition in 2008.

== Programs ==
=== With Grebenkina ===
Season	Original dance	Free dance
2007–2008	Artsakh by Ara Gevorgyan	Godfather by Nino Rota
2006–2007	El Sol Sueno by Jerzy Petersburski; Libertango by Astor Piazzolla	Air by Johann Sebastian Bach
2005–2006	Samba: Ritmo de Bom Bom by Vim; Rhumba: Bésame Mucho by Sunny Skylar, Consuelo Velazquez; Samba: Ritmo de Bom Bom by Vim	Worshipping Govinda by George Harrison
2004–2005	Quickstep: No Me Voy Sin Bailar; Slow foxtrot; Quickstep: No Me Voy Sin Bailar	Symphony No. 25 by Mozart; Music by P. Glass; Symphony No. 25 by Mozart
2003–2004	Blues; Swing	Ani (Armenian Selections) by Ara Gevorkian
2002–2003	March: Persicher Marsch (Persian March) op. 289 by Johann Strauss II; Waltz: Drinking Song (from La Traviata) by Giuseppe Verdi	Scandinavian Dances

=== With Hyden ===
Season	Original dance	Free dance
2000–2001	Swing Kids	Tango Astor Piazzolla

== Competitive highlights ==
=== With Grebenkina for Armenia and Russia ===
International
Event	96–97 (RUS)	97–98 (RUS)	02–03 (ARM)	03–04 (ARM)	04–05 (ARM)	05–06 (ARM)	06–07 (ARM)	07–08 (ARM)
Winter Olympics						20th		
World Champ.			24th	19th	17th	WD	22nd	
European Champ.				13th	11th	14th	14th	WD
GP Bompard				9th		9th	9th	6th
GP Cup of China					8th		6th	
GP Cup of Russia								6th
GP NHK Trophy						3rd		
Schäfer Memorial				1st		6th		
Nepela Memorial								3rd
Skate Israel						3rd		
Golden Spin	3rd	2nd						
Skate Israel		4th						
PFSA Trophy	4th							
National
Russian Champ.	4th	6th						

=== With Hyden for Armenia ===
International
Event	1999–2000	2000–2001	2001–2002
World Championships	30th		
European Championships	23rd	26th	
National
U.S. Championships			7th

=== With Kustarova for Russia ===
International
Event	1994–1995
European Championships	17th
National
Russian Championships	2nd

=== With Davydova for Russia ===
International
Event	1993–1994
World Junior Championships	9th
