= Karina Akopova =

Russian-Armenian pair skater (born 2003)

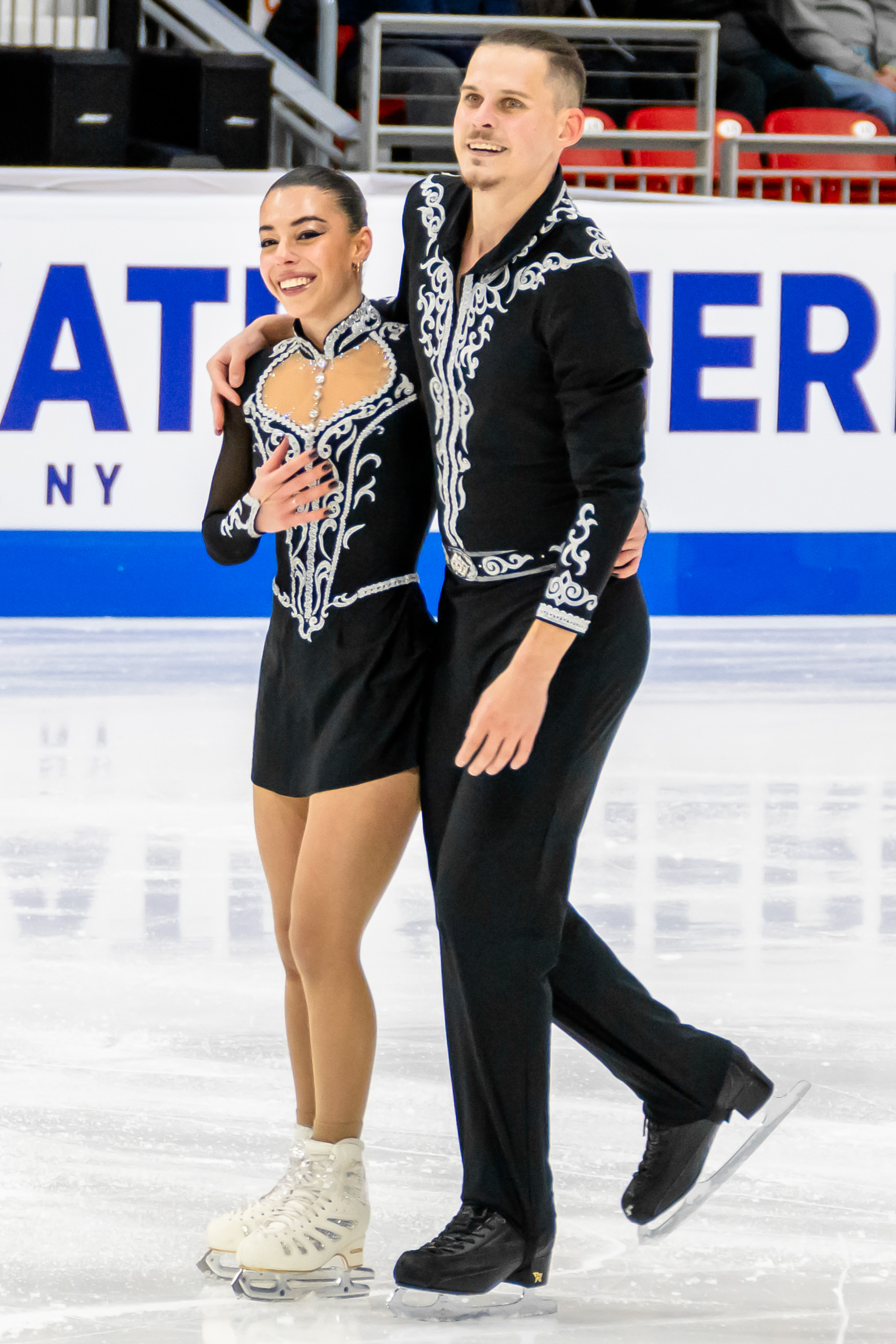
- Karina Akopova and Nikita Rakhmanin following their short program at the 2025 Skate America

Personal information
- Native name: Карина Тиграновна Акопова (Russian)
- Full name: Karina Tigranovna Akopova
- Born: 16 June 2003 (age 23) Moscow, Russia
- Home town: Sochi, Russia
- Height: 1.53 m (5 ft 0 in)

Figure skating career
- Country: Armenia (since 2025); Russia (until 2024)
- Discipline: Pair skating (since 2016)
- Partner: Nikita Rakhmanin (since 2020); Maksim Shagalov (2018–20); Timofei Kuznetsov (2016–17)
- Coach: Fedor Klimov; Dmitri Savin
- Skating club: Armenia
- Began skating: 2008

Medal record
Representing Armenia
Armenian Championships
Gold medal – first place	2026 Yerevan	Pairs

Karina Tigranovna Akopova (Russian: Карина Тиграновна Акопова, Armenian: Կարինա Տիգրանի Ակոպովա; born 16 June 2003) is a Russian-Armenian pair skater who currently competes for Armenia. With her current skating partner, Nikita Rakhmanin, she is the 2026 Armenian national champion and represented Armenia at the 2026 Winter Olympics.

Competing with Rakhmanin for Russia, she is the 2021 Budapest Trophy champion, 2021 Denis Ten Memorial Challenge champion, and 2022 Challenge Cup champion.

With her former partner, Maksim Shagalov, Akopova is the 2019 Volvo Open Cup silver medalist and 2020 Bavarian Open bronze medalist.

== Personal life ==
Akopova was born on 16 June 2003 in Moscow, Russia to parents with Armenian ancestry. Her mother's family settled in Russia in 1988 after being displaced due to the First Nagorno-Karabakh War. Akopova's surname is Russian as a result of Soviet-era russification and administrative pressure.

She previously attended Kuban University of Sport and Tourism and is able to speak Russian, Armenian, and English.

Since 2019, Akopova has been in a relationship with her pair skating partner, Nikita Rakhmanin.

She cites 2014 Olympic champion pair team, Volosozhar/Trankov as her role models.

== Career ==
=== Early years ===
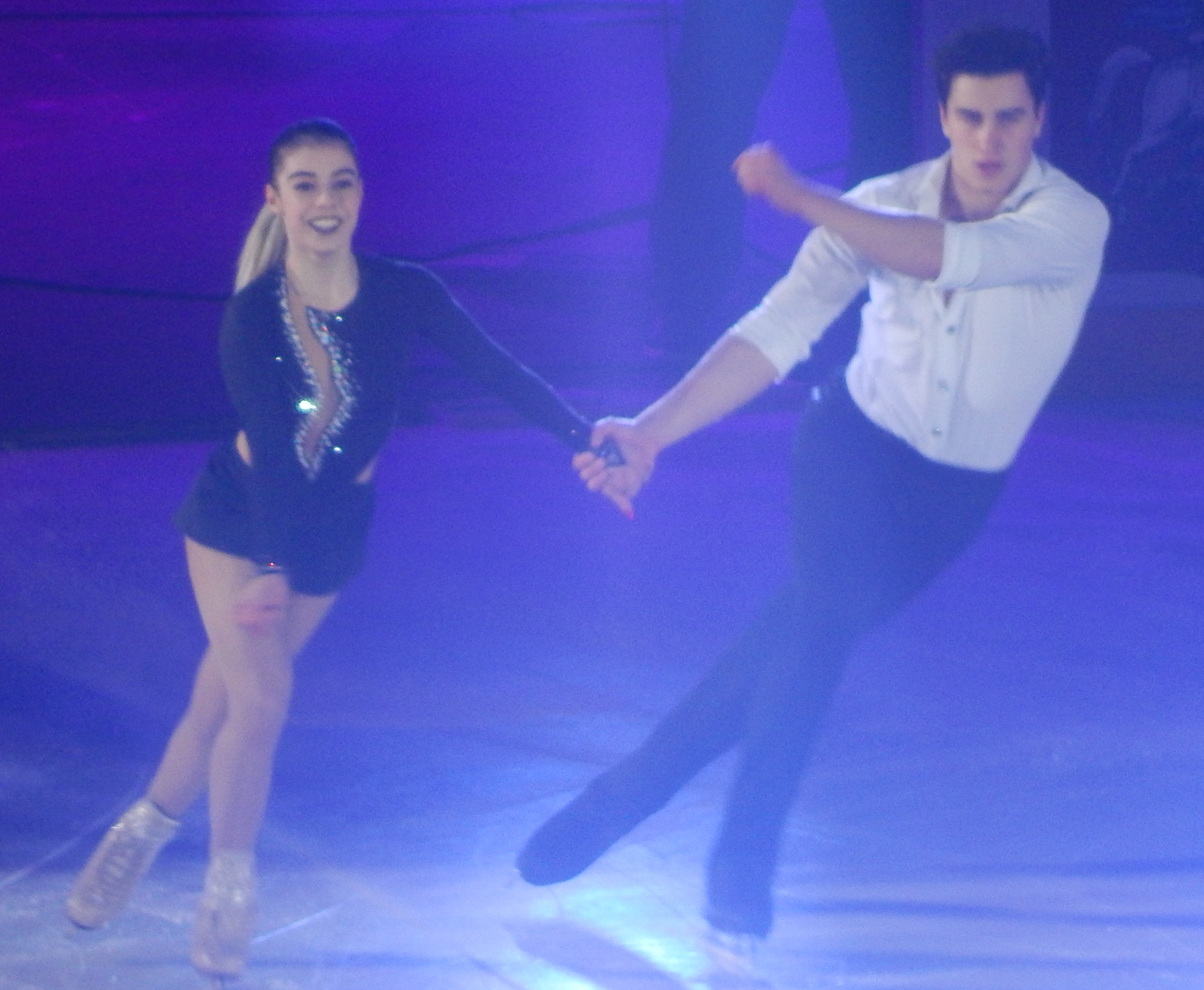
Akopova and Shagalov in 2020

Akopova began learning how to skate in 2008 at the age of five. Initially, several figure skating coaches were not interested in coaching professionally her due to her learning to skate relatively late compared to other young skaters. Akopova was eventually recommended to try-out for coach, Irina Borisovna Strakhova, who ultimately agreed to coach her. Seeing Akopova's potential to be a pair skater, Borisnova Strakhova worked with her over the next eight years to prepare her for the discipline. Following that, she was contacted by Stanislav Morozov, who invited her to try-out as a pair skater for Nina Mozer's skating school, which was ultimately a success and Morozov agreed to begin coaching her.

After six months of skating without a partner, Akopova was approached by coach, Andrei Pachin, who invited her to try-out with his student, Hektor Giotopoulos Moore of Australia. Following a successful tryout, the pair trained in Moscow for a month before flying to Australia to negotiate her transfer with Ice Skating Australia. After three months of additional training, Akopova was contacted by her mother, informing her that the Figure Skating Federation of Russia refused to release her. As a result, Akopova returned to Moscow and eventually teamed up with Timofei Kuznetsov, who she skated with domestically on the junior level during the 2016–17 figure skating season.

Prior to the 2018–19 figure skating season, Akopova teamed up with Maksim Shagalov. Coached by Fedor Klimov and Nina Mozer, the team made their international debut at the 2019 Bavarian Open, finishing in fourth place.

During the 2019–20 figure skating season, Akopova/Shagalov won the silver medal at the 2019 Volvo Open Cup, finished fourth at the 2019 CS Golden Spin of Zagreb, and won the bronze medal at the 2020 Bavarian Open. They parted ways following the season's conclusion.

=== Partnership with Nikita Rakhmanin ===
==== 2020–21 season: Debut of Akopova/Rakhmanin ====
In February 2020, Akopova teamed up with fellow rinkmate, Nikita Rakhmanin, who she had also started dating the year prior. They made their national championship debut at the 2021 Russian Championships, where they finished in seventh place.

Following the Russian Championships, the team's coach, Fedor Klimov, relocated to Sochi. Wanting to continue working with Klimov, Akopova/Rakhmanin decided to make the move to Sochi as well. Upon arriving, Dmitri Savin also joined their coaching team.

==== 2021–22 season ====
Akopova/Rakhmanin opened their season by making their international debut at the 2021 Budapest Trophy, where they won the gold medal. They followed this up with another gold medal at the 2021 Denis Ten Memorial Challenge.

In December, they competed at the 2022 Russian Championships, finishing in sixth place. They then concluded the season by winning gold at the 2022 Challenge Cup.

In early March 2022, the International Skating Union (ISU) banned all figure skaters and officials from Russia and Belarus ISU events due to the Russia's full-scale invasion of Ukraine in late February, restricting Akopova/Rakhmanin from competing for Russia at international events going forward.

==== 2022–23, 2023–24, and 2024–25 seasons: Struggles with injuries and Transfer to Armenia ====
In March 2022, Akopova developed a back injury in tandem with a fractured vertebra she sustained at the beginning of the season. Due to the pain, she began suffering from panic attacks. After nine months, a doctor was able to diagnose her with having an inflammation of the piriformis muscle, which in turn, had been pressing on the sciatic nerve.

Because of Akopova's injuries, the pair struggled to regain their previous competitive form, prompting them to consider trying to skate for another country. Their coaches, Fedor Klimov and Dmitri Savin initially opposed this decision, feeling that skating for a country without internal rivalry, like Russia, could risk stagnation in their skating. Due to Akopova's Armenian heritage, the pair subsequently contacted the Figure Skating Federation of Armenia, which in turn, expressed interest in having Akopova/Rakhmanin represent them. In May 2024, the federation submitted a request to Figure Skating Federation of Russia for Akopova/Rakhmanin's transfer. While awaiting the Figure Skating Federation of Russia, Akopova/Rakhmanin were forced to sit out of competition, including Russian domestic events.

Akopova/Rakhmanin received approval for their transfer from the Figure Skating Federation of Russia in May 2025, allowing the pair to begin competing for Armenia going forward. Speaking on this long wait, Akopova remarked with frustration, "We sent letters from the Armenian side. We got refusals four or five times. We didn’t understand the reason. We were no longer on the Russian national team. We didn’t receive any funding. We had Armenian citizenship. I couldn’t understand why, as someone who is fully Armenian, I wasn’t given a chance to skate for my homeland."

==== 2025–26 season: Debut for Armenia, Milano Cortina Olympics ====
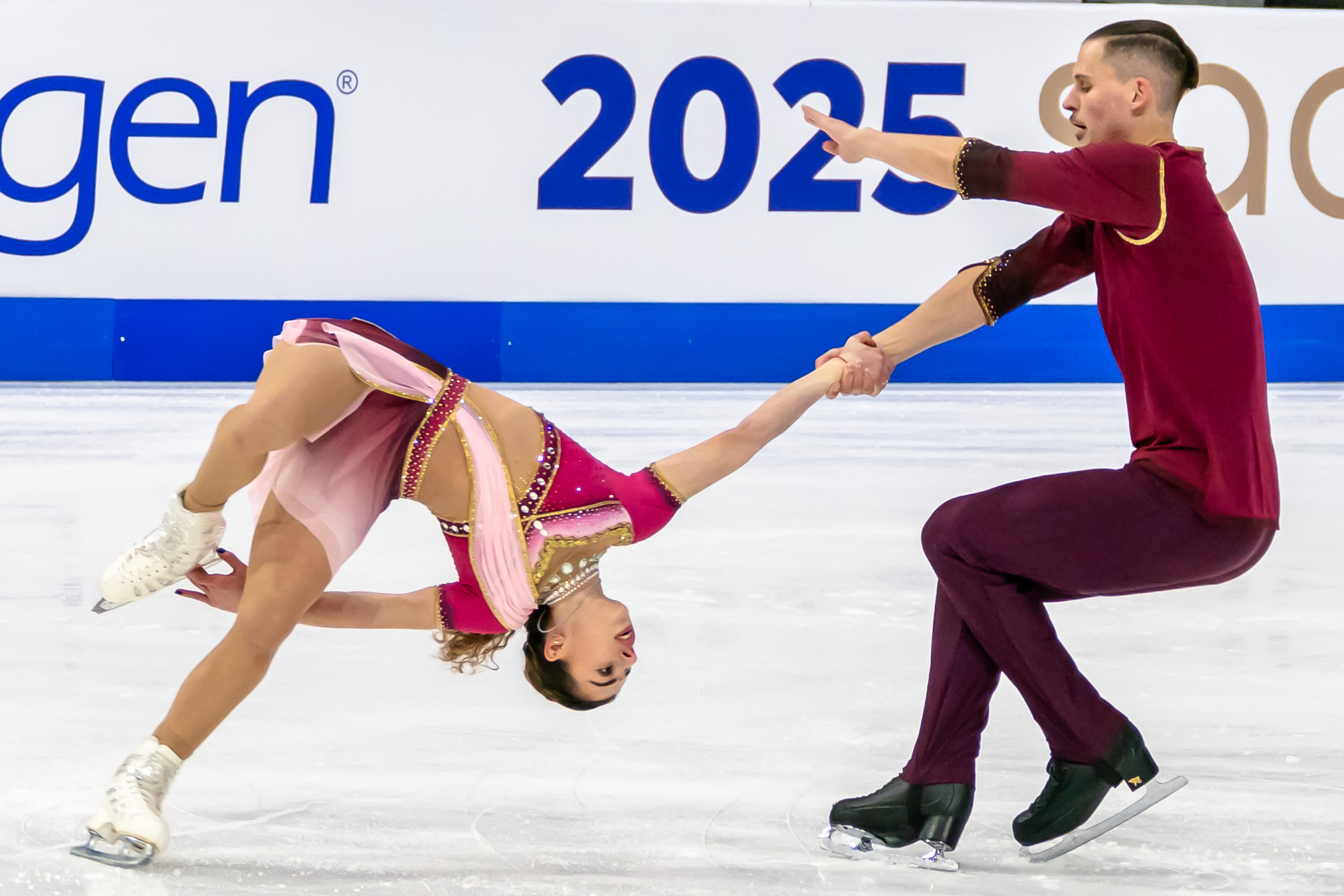
Akopova and Rakhmanin performing a death spiral during their free skate at 2025 Skate America

Going into the season, Akopova/Rakhmanin had their short program choreographed to popular Armenian folk song, "Artsakh" in honour of the country they would be representing going forward.

The pair made their debut for Armenia at the 2025 CS John Nicks International Pairs Competition, where they finished in fifth place. They went on to compete at the 2025 Skate to Milano, the final qualifying event for the 2026 Winter Olympics. There, they placed third in the short program and second in the free skate, winning the silver medal overall. With this result, Akopova/Rakhmanin secured a berth for Armenian pair skating at the upcoming Olympics.

They subsequently competed at the 2025 CS Trialeti Trophy, where they placed fourth.

Days before 2025 Skate America, Akopova/Rakhmanin were called up to compete at the event following the withdrawal of Beccari/Guarise. Due to the last-minute invitation, Akopova/Rakhmanin attended the event without their coaches. They ultimately came in sixth place.

Akopova/Rakhmanin at the 2026 Winter Olympics

In December, Akopova/Rakhmanin won the 2026 Armenian Championships. Although assigned to compete at the 2026 European Championships, the pair were forced to withdraw due to visa issues.

In late January, it was announced that Akopova and Rakhmanin had been selected as the flag bearers for Armenia during the opening ceremony at the upcoming Olympics. On 6 February, about a week before the start of the Olympic pairs competition, the National Olympic Committee of the Republic of Azerbaijan raised concerns with the International Olympic Committee about Akopova and Rakhmanin's song choice for their short program, reasoning that due to the song being about "Artsakh," the Armenian name for Nagorno-Karabakh, implies Armenia having territorial claims over land internationally recognized as part of Azerbaijan despite having been contested over decades of conflict between the two countries. The National Olympic Committee of the Republic of Azerbaijan further stated their belief that using that song would introduce political messaging into Olympic competition and risk violating Olympic Charter principles requiring political neutrality at the Games. Two days later, the International Skating Union released their own statement indicating the situation between all parties involved had been resolved.

==== 2026–2027 season ====
The pair opened their season with a fourth place finish at the 2026 John Nicks Pairs Challenge. In November, they placed fourth at 2026 Cup of China

== Programs ==
=== Pair skating with Nikita Rakhmanin ===
Season	Short program	Free skating	Exhibition
2020–21	Limelight; Theme from Modern Times by Charlie Chaplin; Modern Times performed by J-five choreo. by Ramil Mehdiyev	Dance of the Sugar Plum Fairy (from The Nutcracker) by Pyotr Ilyich Tchaikovsky; Fall on Me (from The Nutcracker and the Four Realms) by Andrea Bocelli & Matteo Bocelli choreo. by Ramil Mehdiyev	
2021–22	The Music of the Night (from The Music of the Night) by Andrew Lloyd Webber performed by Nadim Naaman choreo. by Nikita Mikhailov	Saturday Night Fever; Stayin' Alive; How Deep Is Your Love by Bee Gees choreo. by Nikita Mikhailov	
2022–23	After Dark by Tito & Tarantula; Diga Diga Doo; Jumpin' Jack by Big Bad Voodoo Daddy choreo. by Sofia Evdokimova	Come Together by The Beatles performed by Gerónimo Rauch; Oh! Darling by The Beatles performed by Blues Beatles choreo. by Sofia Evdokimova	
2023–24	Donna Carmen by Pink Noisy ft. Luigi Catalano choreo. by Sofia Evdokimova	Slumdog Millionaire; Latkia's Theme; Ringa Ringa by A. R. Rahman; Jai Ho! (You Are My Destiny) by A. R. Rahman & The Pussycat Dolls choreo. by Sofia Evdokimova	
2025–26	Artsakh by Ara Gevorgyan choreo. by Sofia Evdokimova	Slumdog Millionaire; Latkia's Theme; Ringa Ringa by A. R. Rahman; Jai Ho! (You Are My Destiny) by A. R. Rahman & The Pussycat Dolls choreo. by Sofia Evdokimova	

=== Pair skating with Maksim Shagalov ===
Season	Short program	Free skating
2018–19	Feeling Good by Anthony Newley & Leslie Bricusse performed by Michael Bublé	Carmen by Georges Bizet
2019–20	Feeling Good by Anthony Newley & Leslie Bricusse performed by Michael Bublé	Carmen by Georges Bizet

== Competitive highlights ==
- GP – Event of the ISU Grand Prix Series
- CS – Event of the ISU Challenger Series
- TBD – Assigned
- WD – Withdrew from competition

=== Pair skating with Nikita Rakhmanin (for Armenia) ===
Competition placements at senior level
Season	2025–26	2026–27
Winter Olympics	14th	
World Championships	8th	
Armenian Championships	1st	
GP Skate America	6th	
GP Cup of China		4th
GP NHK Trophy		TBD
CS Trialeti Trophy	4th	
CS John Nicks Pairs	5th	4th
CS Nebelhorn Trophy		7th
Skate to Milano	2nd	

=== Pair skating with Nikita Rakhmanin (for Russia) ===
Competition placements at senior level
Season	2020–21	2021–22
Russian Championships	7th	6th
Budapest Trophy		1st
Challenge Cup		1st
Denis Ten Memorial Challenge		1st

=== Pair skating with Maksim Shagalov (for Russia) ===
Competition placements at senior level
Season	2018–19	2019–20
CS Golden Spin of Zagreb		4th
Bavarian Open	4th	3rd
Volvo Open Cup		2nd

== Detailed results ==
ISU personal best scores in the +5/-5 GOE System
Segment	Type	Score	Event
Total	TSS	190.46	2026 World Championships
Short program	TSS	67.12	2026 World Championships
Short program	TES	39.33	2026 World Championships
Short program	PCS	29.00	2025 CS Trialeti Trophy
Free skating	TSS	123.71	2025 CS Trialeti Trophy
Free skating	TES	66.14	2025 Skate to Milano
Free skating	PCS	59.59	2026 World Championships

=== Pair skating with Nikita Rakhmanin (for Armenia) ===
Results in the 2025–26 season
Date	Event	SP		FS		Total	
Date	Event	P	Score	P	Score	P	Score
Sep 2–3, 2025	(United States) 2025 CS John Nicks Pairs	5	65.20	5	109.64	5	174.84
Sep 17–21, 2025	(China) 2025 Skate to Milano	3	63.85	2	122.99	2	186.84
Oct 8–11, 2025	(Georgia (country)) 2025 CS Trialeti Trophy	4	65.14	3	123.71	4	188.85
Nov 14–16, 2025	(United States) 2025 Skate America	4	64.74	7	106.24	6	170.98
Dec 12–13, 2025	(Armenia) 2026 Armenian Championships	1	73.35	1	129.59	1	202.94
Feb 6–19, 2026	(Italy) 2026 Winter Olympics	12	66.27	14	114.39	14	180.66
Mar 24–29, 2026	(Czech Republic) 2026 World Championships	8	67.12	9	123.34	8	190.46

Results in the 2026–27 season
Date	Event	SP		FS		Total	
Date	Event	P	Score	P	Score	P	Score
Sep 11–12, 2026	(United States) 2026 John Nicks Challenge	2	68.03	4	108.48	4	176.51
Sep 24–26, 2026	(Germany) 2026 CS Nebelhorn Trophy	6	59.25	9	95.87	7	155.12
Nov 6–8, 2026	2026 Cup of China	3	66.34	4	115.12	4	181.46

=== Pair skating with Nikita Rakhmanin (for Russia) ===
Results in the 2020–21 season
Date	Event	SP		FS		Total	
Date	Event	P	Score	P	Score	P	Score
Dec 23–27, 2020	(Russia) 2021 Russian Championships	8	65.44	6	129.33	7	194.77

Results in the 2021–22 season
Date	Event	SP		FS		Total	
Date	Event	P	Score	P	Score	P	Score
Oct 14–17, 2021	(Hungary) 2021 Budapest Trophy	1	68.10	1	133.02	1	201.12
Oct 27–31, 2021	(Kazakhstan) 2021 Denis Ten Memorial Challenge	1	70.33	1	125.53	1	195.86
Dec 22–24, 2021	(Russia) 2022 Russian Championships	7	73.06	5	137.71	6	210.77
Feb 24–27, 2022	(Netherlands) 2022 Challenge Cup	1	66.16	1	123.17	1	189.33

Olympic Games
Preceded by Tina Garabedian and Mikayel Mikayelyan	Flagbearer for Armenia (with Nikita Rakhmanin); Milano Cortina 2026	Succeeded by
