= Sumitada Moriguchi =

Japanese pair skater (born 2001)

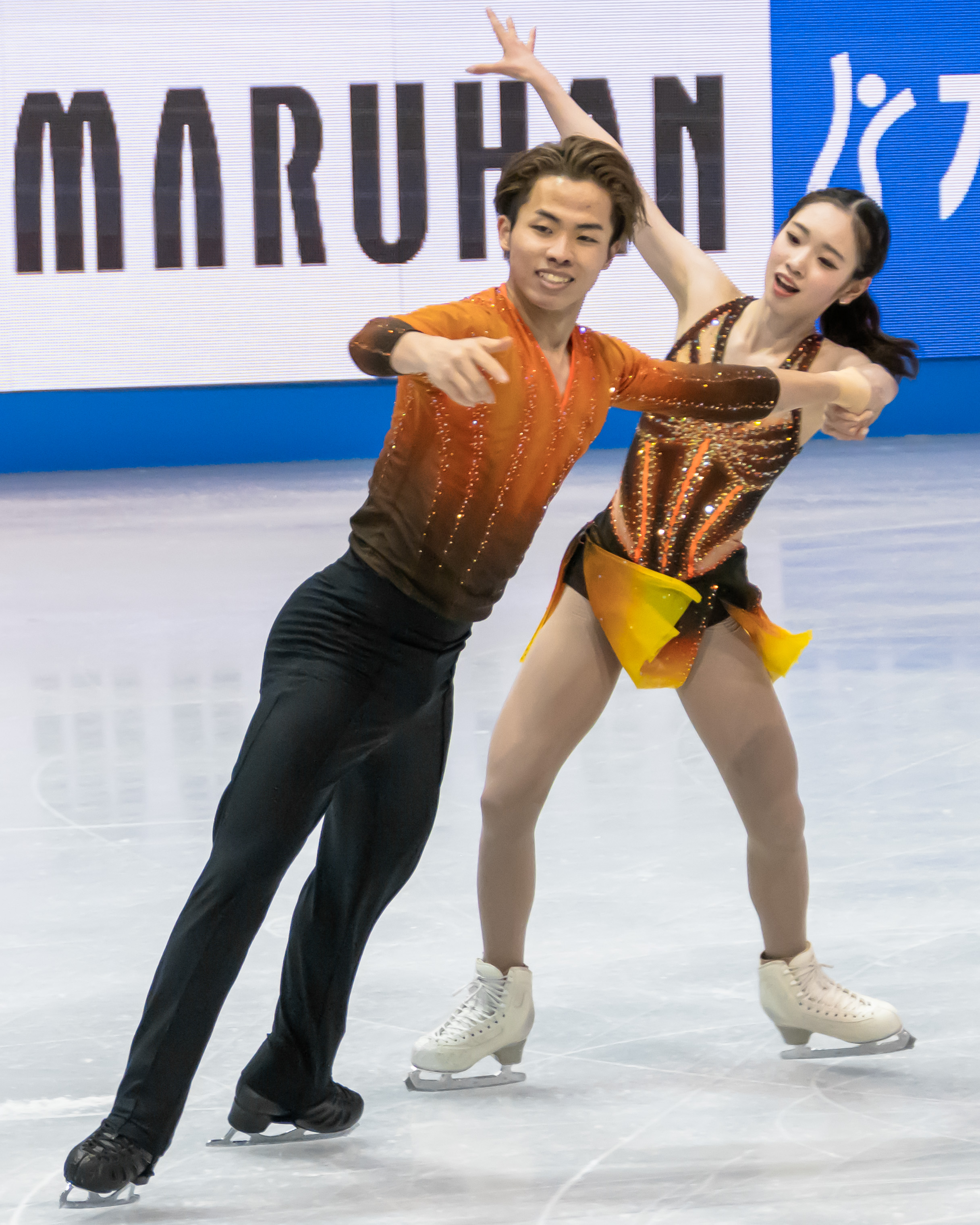
- Nagaoka and Moriguchi at the 2025 World Championships

Personal information
- Native name: 森口 澄士
- Born: December 29, 2001 (age 24) Kyoto, Japan
- Home town: Kyoto
- Height: 1.74 m (5 ft 9 in)

Figure skating career
- Country: Japan
- Discipline: Pair skating (since 2022); Men's singles (2012–23)
- Partner: Yuna Nagaoka (since 2023); Haruna Murakami (2022–23); Ikura Kushida (2021)
- Coach: Dmitri Savin; Fedor Klimov; Sofia Evdokimova; Mie Hamada; Cathy Reed; Satsuki Muramoto; Hiroaki Sato
- Skating club: Kinoshita Academy
- Began skating: 2010
Four Continents Championships
Bronze medal – third place	2026 Beijing	Pairs
Japan Championships
Gold medal – first place	2022–23 Osaka	Pairs
Gold medal – first place	2023–24 Nagano	Pairs
Gold medal – first place	2025–26 Tokyo	Pairs
Silver medal – second place	2024–25 Osaka	Pairs

Sumitada Moriguchi (森口 澄士, Moriguchi Sumitada; born December 29, 2001) is a Japanese pair skater. With partner Yuna Nagaoka, he is the 2026 Four Continents bronze medalist, the 2025 Asian Winter Games bronze medalist, the 2026 Cup of China bronze medalist, the 2025 CS Kinoshita Group Cup bronze medalist, and a two-time Japanese national champion. He represented Japan at the 2026 Winter Olympics.

With former partner Haruna Murakami, he is the 2022 JGP Poland I bronze medalist and the 2022–23 Japan national champion on both the senior and junior levels.

== Personal life ==
Moriguchi was born on 29 December 2001 in Kyoto, Japan.

He studied Faculty of Commerce at Doshisha University before graduating in March 2024.

== Career ==
=== Early career ===
Moriguchi began figure skating in 2010 after being inspired by watching Daisuke Takahashi win the bronze medal at the 2010 Winter Olympics. His first coach was Yoko Ishii.

He competed at the 2016–17, 2018–19, and the 2019–20 Japan Junior Championships, respectively finishing twenty-ninth, twentieth, and nineteenth at those events. Following the latter season, Moriguchi began training under Mie Hamada.

He would go on to compete at the 2020–21 Japan Championships, placing twelfth at the senior level. In the spring of 2021, Moriguchi decided to try pairs skating after Hamada suggested that he give the discipline a try due to his long limbs and naturally strong back. He initially teamed up with Ikura Kushida, however, their partnership ended in the fall of that year before they got the chance to compete together. He went on to place thirteenth at the 2021–22 Japan Championships in the men's singles event.

=== Partnership with Murakami ===
==== 2022–23 season: Debut of Murakami/Moriguchi and first Japan national title ====
At the suggestion of Mie Hamada, Moriguchi decided to team up with fellow Hamada student Haruna Murakami. Coached by Hamada, Narumi Takahashi, Bruno Marcotte, and Brian Shales, the pair debuted on the 2022–23 Junior Grand Prix. The finished fourth at the 2022 JGP Czech Republic and third at the 2022 JGP Poland I. They then went on to compete at the 2022–23 Japan Junior Championships, winning the gold medal.

Although initially listed as alternates to compete at the 2022–23 Junior Grand Prix Final in Turin, Italy, they were ultimately called up to compete due to the withdrawal of Canadian pair team, Kemp/Elizarov. At the Final, Murakami/Moriguchi placed fifth in the short program and third in the free skate, finishing in fourth place overall.

They went on to compete at the 2022–23 Japan Championships, which they won, after Miura/Kihara were forced to withdraw due to flight delays. Moriguchi also competed in the men's singles event at Nationals and finished seventh, his highest result to date.

Selected to compete at the 2023 World Junior Championships in Calgary, Alberta, Murakami/Moriguchi finished fourth after placing sixth in the short program and fourth in the free skate.

Moriguchi went on to compete at the 2023 Triglav Trophy, where he won the silver medal behind Nozomu Yoshioka.

Following the season, it was announced that Murakami/Moriguchi had parted ways due to Moriguchi no longer being age eligible to compete on the junior level and Murakami being age ineligible to compete on the senior level for another three years.

=== Partnership with Nagaoka ===
==== 2023–2024 season: Debut of Nagaoka/Moriguchi ====
In April 2023, pairs coach, Bruno Marcotte suggested that Moriguchi try pair skating with Yuna Nagaoka after noticing her potential as a pairs skater during a training camp that was organized by the Japan Skating Federation. Following a successful tryout, the pair decided to team up with their long-term goal being to compete at the 2026 Winter Olympics. They were officially announced as a pair team in May 2022. It was also announced that Nagaoka/Moriguchi would primarily train at the Kinoshita Academy, where they would work with coaches Mie Hamada, Cathy Reed, Satsuki Muramoto, and Hiroaki Sato, while also making frequent trips to Oakville, Ontario, Canada to work with pair skating coaches Bruno Marcotte and Brian Shales at the Oakville Skating Club.

They debuted as a pair at the Japan Eastern Sectionals, which they won. Elected as a host pick, Nagaoka/Moriguchi made their Grand Prix debut at the 2023 NHK Trophy. They scored 45.36 for their short program, 90.03 for their free, and 135.39 overall, placing eighth. They went on to win gold at the 2023–24 Japanese National Championships.

They were named to the 2024 World team on the condition that they could obtain their technical minimums at the 2024 Bavarian Open or the 2024 International Challenge Cup. At these events, Nagaoka/Moriguchi finished fourth and sixth respectively. Although the pair scored the scored the minimum technical element score needed for the free skate, they failed to score the minimum technical element score for the short program. As a result, they were unable to compete at the 2024 World Championships.

==== 2024–2025 season ====
Nagaoka/Moriguchi began their season by competing at the 2024 CS John Nicks International Pairs Competition, where they finished eighth. Going on to compete on the 2024–25 Grand Prix series, Nagaoka/Moriguchi scored personal bests in all competition segments at the 2024 NHK Trophy and finish in seventh place overall. The team would also surpass the minimum technical element score, making them eligible to compete at the World Championships. Initially only assigned one Grand Prix event, Nagaoka/Moriguchi's names were assigned to the 2024 Finlandia Trophy days before the event following the withdrawal of Australian pair team Golubeva/Giotopoulos Moore. At the event, the pair place eighth of the eight pair teams in the short program but would score a personal best free skate by almost eight points, finishing third in that competition segment and moving up to sixth place overall.

In late December, the pair won the silver medal at the 2024–25 Japan Championships behind Miura/Kihara. They were subsequently named to the Four Continents and World teams.

Selected to compete at the 2025 Asian Winter Games in Harbin, China, Nagaoka/Moriguchi won the bronze medal behind Geynish/Chigirev and Ryom/Han.

At the 2025 Four Continents Championships in Seoul, South Korea, Nagaoka/Moriguchi finished in seventh place following a ninth-place short program and a sixth-place free skate. Going on to compete at the 2025 World Championships in Boston, Massachusetts, United States the following month, Nagaoka/Moriguchi placed twenty-second in the short program and did not advance to the free skate segment. Following this disappointing result, Nagaoka considered quitting the sport but decided to continue following the encouragement of Moriguchi.

Feeling the need for a change and hoping to improve their consistency, Nagaoka/Moriguchi decided to make a coaching change from Bruno Marcotte and Brian Shales to Dmitri Savin, Fedor Klimov, and Sofia Evdokimova.

==== 2025–2026 season: Milano Cortina Olympics, Four Continents bronze ====
Nagaoka/Moriguchi kicked off their season by winning the bronze medal at the 2025 CS Kinoshita Group Cup. A couple weeks following that event, they competed at the ISU Skate to Milano, the final qualifying event for the 2026 Winter Olympics. There, they managed to capture the bronze medal thus securing a second Olympic berth for Japanese pair skating.

The following month, Nagaoka/Moriguchi placed fourth at 2025 NHK Trophy, earning new personal bests in the short program, free skate, and total scores in the process. Two weeks later, Nagaoka/Moriguchi finished fourth at 2025 Finlandia Trophy. "We are very glad that the technical score and the PCS were both over 60," Moriguchi said after the free skate. "We know that there is room to improve on the throw jumps and also on the levels."

In December, they competed at the 2025–26 Japan Championships, winning their second national title. Following the event, Nagaoka/Moriguchi were officially selected to Japan's 2026 Winter Olympic team.

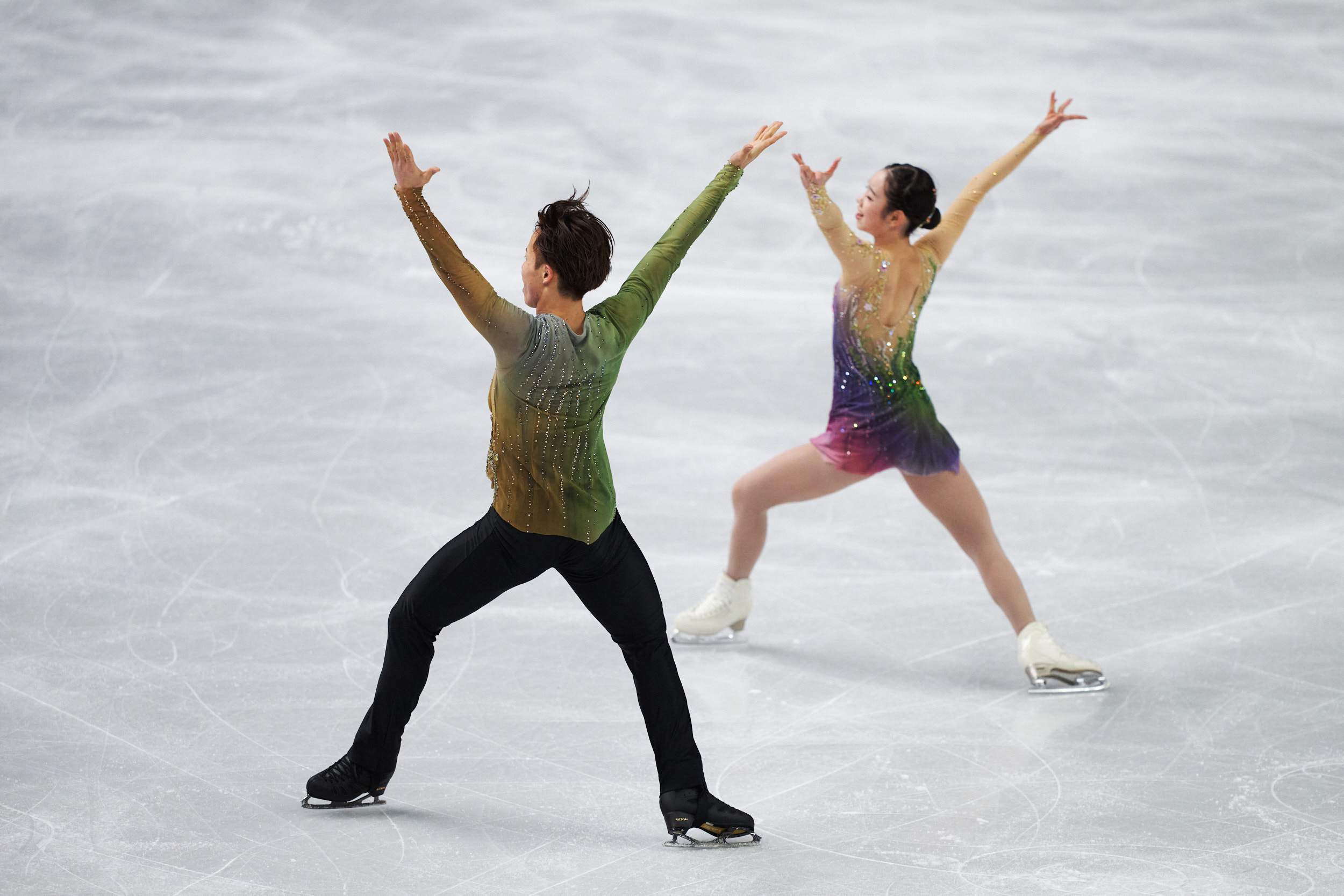
Nagaoka and Morguchi performing side-by-side Ina Bauers at the 2026 World Championships

The following month, Nagaoka and Moriguchi took the bronze medal at the 2026 Four Continents Championships in Beijing, China. "This is our first Four Continents championships medal," noted Moriguchi. "We are generally happy about that. So, this medal will be embedded in our skating career memory."

In February, Nagaoka and Moriguchi competed in the Winter Olympics, their first. They finished 19th of 19 teams after Nagaoka fell on their side-by-side triple loop and throw triple Salchow, which kept them from qualifying for the free skate.

In March, Nagaoka and Moriguchi competed at the 2026 World Figure Skating Championships, where they finished fourth. They were fifth in the short program and third in the free skate. “We’ve been doing our best as a pair to push ourselves to the limit of what we can do,” said Moriguchi. “So, I’m glad we were able to perform in a way that feels like it paid off.”

=== 2026–27 season ===
Nagaoka and Moriguchi opened their season in November at 2026 Cup of China where they finished in third place. “I’m really happy that we were able to win a bronze medal here at the Cup of China,” said Sumitada. “Before this season started, Yuna suffered two serious injuries, so we started preparing for the season very late. We actually only had about one and a half to two months to prepare.”

== Programs ==
=== Pair skating with Yuna Nagaoka ===
Season	Short program	Free skating	Exhibition
2025–2026	Goodbye Yellow Brick Road (from Ant-Man and the Wasp: Quantumania) by Elton John & Bernie Taupin remixed by Epic Geek & Alala choreo. by Cathy Reed	Tree of Life Suite; V. Figlia del Cielo; I. Sonanze; II. Fiamme; VI. Wild Side by Roberto Cacciapaglia choreo. by Cathy Reed	Pump It Up! by Danzel performed by Endor; Gonna Make You Sweat (Everybody Dance Now) by C+C Music Factory
2024–2025	Goodbye Yellow Brick Road (from Ant-Man and the Wasp: Quantumania) by Elton John & Bernie Taupin remixed by Epic Geek & Alala choreo. by Cathy Reed	Space Table Symphony by Bernd Breiter & David Garrett choreo. by Cathy Reed	Pump It Up! by Danzel performed by Endor; Gonna Make You Sweat (Everybody Dance Now) by C+C Music Factory
2023–2024	Can't Take My Eyes Off You by Bob Crewe & Bob Gaudio performed by John Lloyd Young choreo. by Cathy Reed	Space Table Symphony by Bernd Breiter & David Garrett choreo. by Cathy Reed	Pump It Up! by Danzel performed by Endor; Gonna Make You Sweat (Everybody Dance Now) by C+C Music Factory

=== Pair skating with Haruna Murakami ===
Season	Short program	Free skating
2022–2023	Le Corsaire by Adolphe Adam, Léo Delibes choreo. by Cathy Reed	I Want to Hold Your Hand; All My Loving; All You Need Is Love (from Across the Universe) by The Beatles, Elliot Goldenthal, T. V. Carpio, Jim Sturgess, Dana Fuchs choreo. by Cathy Reed

=== Singles skating ===
Season	Short program	Free skating
2022–2023	Breakthru by Queen choreo. by Cathy Reed	Jekyll & Hyde: I Need to Know; Alive by Frank Wildhorn performed by Anthony Warlow choreo. by Cathy Reed
2021–2022	I'm Still Standing by Elton John choreo. by Cathy Reed	Jekyll & Hyde: I Need to Know; Alive by Frank Wildhorn performed by Anthony Warlow choreo. by Cathy Reed
2020–2021	Hallelujah by Leonard Cohen choreo. by Cathy Reed	Selections from Cirque du Soleil by René Dupéré choreo. by Cathy Reed

== Competitive highlights ==
- GP – Event of the ISU Grand Prix Series
- JGP – Event of the ISU Junior Grand Prix Series
- CS – Event of the ISU Challenger Series
- TBD – Assigned
- WD – Withdrew from competition

=== Pair skating with Yuna Nagaoka ===
Competition placements at senior level
Season	2023–24	2024–25	2025–26	2026–27
Winter Olympics			19th	
World Championships		22nd	4th	
Four Continents Championships		7th	3rd	
Japan Championships	1st	2nd	1st	
GP Finland		6th	4th	
GP NHK Trophy	8th	7th	4th	
GP Cup of China				3rd
CS Kinoshita Group Cup			3rd	
CS John Nicks Pairs Challenge		8th		
Bavarian Open	4th			
Challenge Cup	6th			
Asian Winter Games		3rd		
Skate to Milano			3rd	

=== Pair skating with Haruna Murakami ===
International: Junior
Event	22–23
Junior Worlds	4th
JGP Final	4th
JGP Czech Republic	4th
JGP Poland	3rd
National
Japan Championships	1st
Japan Junior Championships	1st

=== Men's singles ===
International
Event	16–17	17–18	18–19	19–20	20–21	21–22	22–23
Triglav Trophy							2nd
National
Japan Championships					12th	13th	7th
Japan Junior Championships	29th		20th	19th			

== Detailed results ==
ISU personal best scores in the +5/-5 GOE System
Segment	Type	Score	Event
Total	**TSS**	**209.13**	2026 World Championships
Short program	**TSS**	**71.52**	2025 NHK Trophy
Short program	TES	39.94	2025 NHK Trophy
Short program	PCS	31.58	2025 NHK Trophy
Free skating	**TSS**	**139.58**	2026 World Championships
Free skating	TES	63.42	2026 World Championships
Free skating	PCS	66.16	2026 World Championships

=== Pair skating with Yuna Nagaoka ===
Results in the 2023–24 season
Date	Event	SP		FS		Total	
Date	Event	P	Score	P	Score	P	Score
Nov 24–26, 2023	(Japan) 2023 NHK Trophy	8	45.36	8	90.03	8	135.39
Dec 20–24, 2023	2023–24 Japan Championships	1	56.07	1	117.57	1	173.64
Jan 30–Feb 4, 2024	(Germany) 2024 Bavarian Open	5	48.90	4	100.35	4	149.25
Feb 22–25, 2024	(Netherlands) 2024 Challenge Cup	6	51.98	4	106.46	6	158.44

Results in the 2024–25 season
Date	Event	SP		FS		Total	
Date	Event	P	Score	P	Score	P	Score
Sep 3–4, 2024	(United States) 2024 CS John Nicks Pairs	8	55.92	8	102.98	8	158.90
Nov 8–10, 2024	(Japan) 2024 NHK Trophy	5	60.32	7	112.15	7	172.47
Nov 15–17, 2024	(Finland) 2024 Finlandia Trophy	8	51.75	3	120.05	6	171.80
Dec 19–22, 2024	2024–25 Japan Championships	2	61.82	2	114.86	2	176.68
Feb 11–13, 2025	(China) 2025 Asian Winter Games	2	58.49	3	109.86	3	168.35
Feb 19–23, 2025	(South Korea) 2025 Four Continents Championships	9	57.29	6	117.47	7	174.76
Mar 25–30, 2025	(United States) 2025 World Championships	22	51.10	—N/a	—N/a	22	51.10

Results in the 2025–26 season
Date	Event	SP		FS		Total	
Date	Event	P	Score	P	Score	P	Score
Sep 5–7, 2025	(Japan) 2025 CS Kinoshita Group Cup	3	66.27	3	126.50	3	192.77
Sep 18–21, 2025	(China) 2025 ISU Skate to Milano	4	62.68	3	115.98	3	178.66
Nov 7–9, 2025	(Japan) 2025 NHK Trophy	4	**71.52**	3	130.59	4	202.11
Nov 21–23, 2025	(Finland) 2025 Finlandia Trophy	5	67.53	4	125.59	4	193.12
Dec 18–21, 2025	2025–26 Japan Championships	2	72.91	1	142.39	1	215.30
Jan 21–25, 2026	(China) 2026 Four Continents Championships	2	71.95	3	125.51	3	197.46
Feb 15-16, 2026	(Italy) 2026 Winter Olympics	19	59.62	-	-	19	59.62
Mar 24–29, 2026	(Czech Republic) 2026 World Championships	5	69.55	3	**139.58**	4	**209.13**

Results in the 2026–27 season
Date	Event	SP		FS		Total	
Date	Event	P	Score	P	Score	P	Score
Nov 6–8, 2026	2026 Cup of China	4	63.06	3	118.44	3	181.50

=== Pair skating with Haruna Murakami ===
Current personal best scores are highlighted in bold.

2022–23 season
Date	Event	Level	SP	FS	Total
February 27–March 5, 2023	2023 World Junior Championships	Junior	6; **55.69**	4; **99.02**	4; **154.71**
December 21–25, 2022	2022–23 Japan Championships	Senior	1; 54.21	1; 107.86	1; 162.07
December 8–11, 2022	2022–23 JGP Final	Junior	5; 46.80	3; 102.23	4; 149.03
November 25–27, 2022	2022–23 Japan Junior Championships	Junior	1; 52.72	1; 96.36	1; 149.08
September 28–October 1, 2022	2022 JGP Poland I	Junior	4; 47.94	2; 92.41	3; 140.35
August 31–September 3, 2022	2022 JGP Czech Republic	Junior	5; 42.34	3; 87.50	4; 129.84

=== Singles skating ===
==== Senior results ====
2022–23 season
Date	Event	SP	FS	Total
April 13–16, 2023	2023 Triglav Trophy	2; 79.47	2; 153.32	2; 232.79
December 21–25, 2022	2022–23 Japan Championships	10; 76.31	5; 165.32	7; 241.63
2021–22 season
Date	Event	SP	FS	Total
December 22–26, 2021	2021–22 Japan Championships	13; 76.14	16; 125.16	13; 201.30
2020–21 season
Date	Event	SP	FS	Total
December 23–27, 2020	2020–21 Japan Championships	17; 66.18	12; 129.92	12; 196.10

==== Junior results ====
2019–20 season
Date	Event	SP	FS	Total
November 15–27, 2019	2019–20 Japan Junior Championships	19; 47.50	19; 97.58	19; 145.08
2018–19 season
November 23–25, 2018	2018–19 Japan Junior Championships	24; 47.05	18; 91.62	20; 138.67
2016–17 season
Date	Event	SP	FS	Total
November 23–25, 2016	2016–17 Japan Junior Championships	29; 37.57	–	29; 37.57
