= Figure skating at the 2026 Winter Olympics – Pair skating =

Pair skating at the XXV Olympic Winter Games
- Venue: Milano Ice Skating Arena; Milan, Italy
- Dates: 15–16 February 2026
- Competitors: 19 teams from 14 nations
- Winning score: 231.24 points

Medalists
1st place, gold medalist(s)		Riku Miura and Ryuichi Kihara	Japan
2nd place, silver medalist(s)		Anastasiia Metelkina and Luka Berulava	Georgia
3rd place, bronze medalist(s)		Minerva Fabienne Hase and Nikita Volodin	Germany

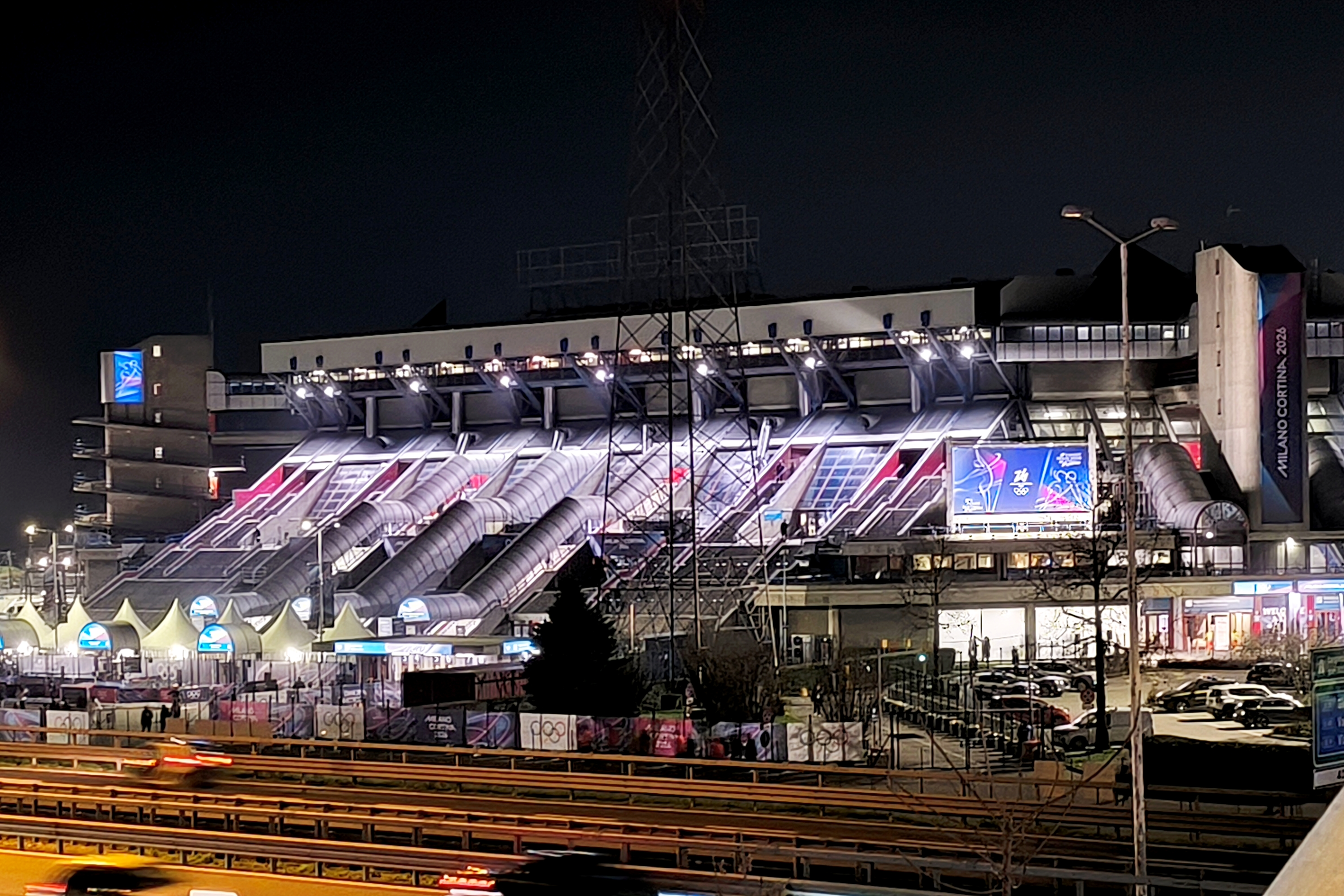
The figure skating events at the 2026 Winter Olympics were held at the Milano Ice Skating Arena in Milan, Italy.

The pairs figure skating competition at the 2026 Winter Olympics was held on 15 and 16 February 2026 at the Milano Ice Skating Arena in Milan, Italy, and featured 19 teams from 14 nations. Riku Miura and Ryuichi Kihara of Japan won the gold medals, Anastasiia Metelkina and Luka Berulava of Georgia won the silver, and Minerva Fabienne Hase and Nikita Volodin of Germany won the bronze. Miura and Kihara had earlier won silver medals as part of the Japanese team that finished second in the team event. In addition to their gold-medal win here, Miura and Kihara set a new world record score in the free skate. This also marked Japan's first Olympic medal in pair skating, as well as Georgia's first ever Winter Olympic medal in any sport.

== Background ==
In October 2023, the International Olympic Committee suspended the Olympic Committee of Russia. The skating federations of Russia and Belarus were each permitted to nominate one skater or team from each discipline to participate at the Skate to Milano as a means to qualify for the 2026 Winter Olympics as Individual Neutral Athletes. Each nominee was required to pass a special screening process to assess whether they had displayed any active support for the 2022 Russian invasion of Ukraine or had any contractual links to the Russian or Belarusian military. No pairs teams from either Russia or Belarus competed at the 2026 Winter Olympics.

The pair skating event was one of five figure skating competitions contested at the 2026 Winter Olympics in Milan, Italy. It was held at the Milano Ice Skating Arena over two days: the short program took place on 15 February and the free skating took place on 16 February. The competition featured 19 teams from 14 nations. Daria Danilova and Michel Tsiba made history as the first Dutch pair skating team to qualify for the Winter Olympics. Having won both segments of the team event, Riku Miura and Ryuichi Kihara of Japan were seen as the most likely candidates to win the gold. Miura and Kihara were two-time world champions and also won two silver medals in the team events at the 2022 and 2026 Winter Olympics, winning both pairs' segments in the latter.

At age 42, Deanna Stellato-Dudek of Canada was the oldest woman to compete in figure skating at the Olympics. She had competed in single skating as a teenager, winning a gold medal at the 1999 Junior Grand Prix Final and a silver medal at the 2000 World Junior Championships, before retiring in 2001 due to injury. She returned to skating as a pair skater in 2016, first with Nathan Bartholomay and competing for the United States, and then with Maxime Deschamps and competing for Canada. In 2024, she became the oldest woman to win a gold medal at the World Championships. At the 2025 John Nicks Pairs Competition, Stellato-Dudek performed a backflip with an assist from Deschamps. Stellato-Dudek, becoming the first woman to perform the backflip since it became a legal element in figure skating in 2024. On 2 February, Skate Canada announced that Stellato-Dudek and Deschamps would not compete in the team event after Stellato-Dudek suffered an injury during practice, but that no decision had been made with regards to the pairs event. She was later medically cleared to compete. After their arrival in Milan, it was confirmed that she and Deschamps would not perform the backflip as part of their short program.

== Qualification ==
Sixteen quota spots in the pairs event were awarded based on results at the 2025 World Figure Skating Championships. An additional three spots were awarded at the Skate to Milano. Uzbekistan originally qualified one quota spot after Ekaterina Geynish and Dmitrii Chigirev finished in tenth place at the World Championships. However, after Geynish and Chigirev ended their partnership, the spot was re-allocated to France, who chose to send Camille Kovalev and Pavel Kovalev.

Quota spots in pair skating
Event	Teams per NOC	Qualifying NOCs	Total teams
2025 World Championships	2	Canada; Italy; Germany; United States	15
2025 World Championships	1	Japan; Georgia; Australia; Hungary; ~~Uzbekistan~~; Great Britain; Poland; Netherlands	15
Skate to Milano	1	China; Armenia; Japan; France	4
Total			19

== Required performance elements ==
Pairs performed their short programs on 15 February. Lasting 2 minutes 40 seconds (+/− 10 seconds), the short program had to include the following elements: one pair lift, one double or triple twist lift, one double or triple throw jump, one double or triple solo jump, one solo spin combination with a change of foot, one death spiral, and one step sequence using the full ice surface.

The sixteen highest-scoring pairs after the short program advanced to the free skating on 16 February. Lasting 4 minutes (+/− 10 seconds), the free skate had to include the following: three pair lifts, of which one had to be a twist lift; two different throw jumps; one solo jump; one jump combination or sequence; one pair spin combination; one death spiral; and one choreographic sequence.

== Judging ==
Skaters were judged according to the required technical elements of their program (such as jumps and spins), as well as the overall presentation of their program, based on three program components (skating skills, presentation, and composition). Each technical element in a figure skating performance was assigned a predetermined base point value and scored by a panel of nine judges on a scale from −5 to +5 based on the quality of its execution. Each Grade of Execution (GOE) from –5 to +5 was assigned a value as indicated on the Scale of Values. For example, a triple Axel was worth a base value of 8.00 points, and a GOE of +3 was worth 2.40 points, so a triple Axel with a GOE of +3 earned 10.40 points. The judging panel's GOE for each element was determined by calculating the trimmed mean (the average after discarding the highest and lowest scores). The panel's scores for all elements were added together to generate a Total Elements Score. At the same time, the judges evaluated each performance based on the five aforementioned program components and assigned each a score from 0.25 to 10 in 0.25-point increments. The judging panel's final score for each program component was also determined by calculating the trimmed mean. Those scores were then multiplied by the factor shown on the chart below; the results were added together to generate a total Program Component Score.

Program component factoring
Discipline	Short program	Free skate
Pairs	1.33	2.67

Deductions were applied for certain violations, such as time infractions or falls. The Total Elements Score and Program Component Score were then added together, minus any deductions, to generate a final performance score for each team.

== Results ==
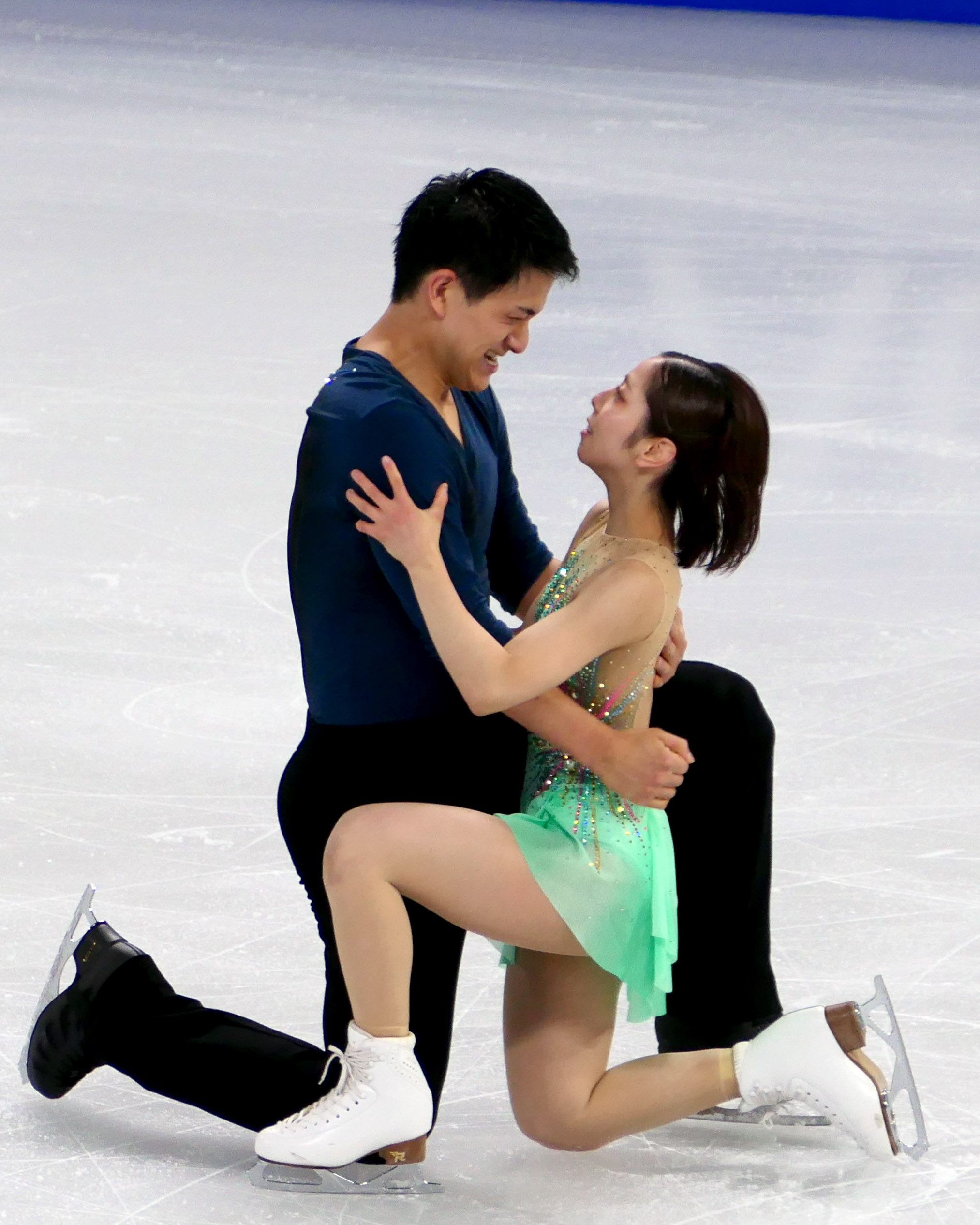
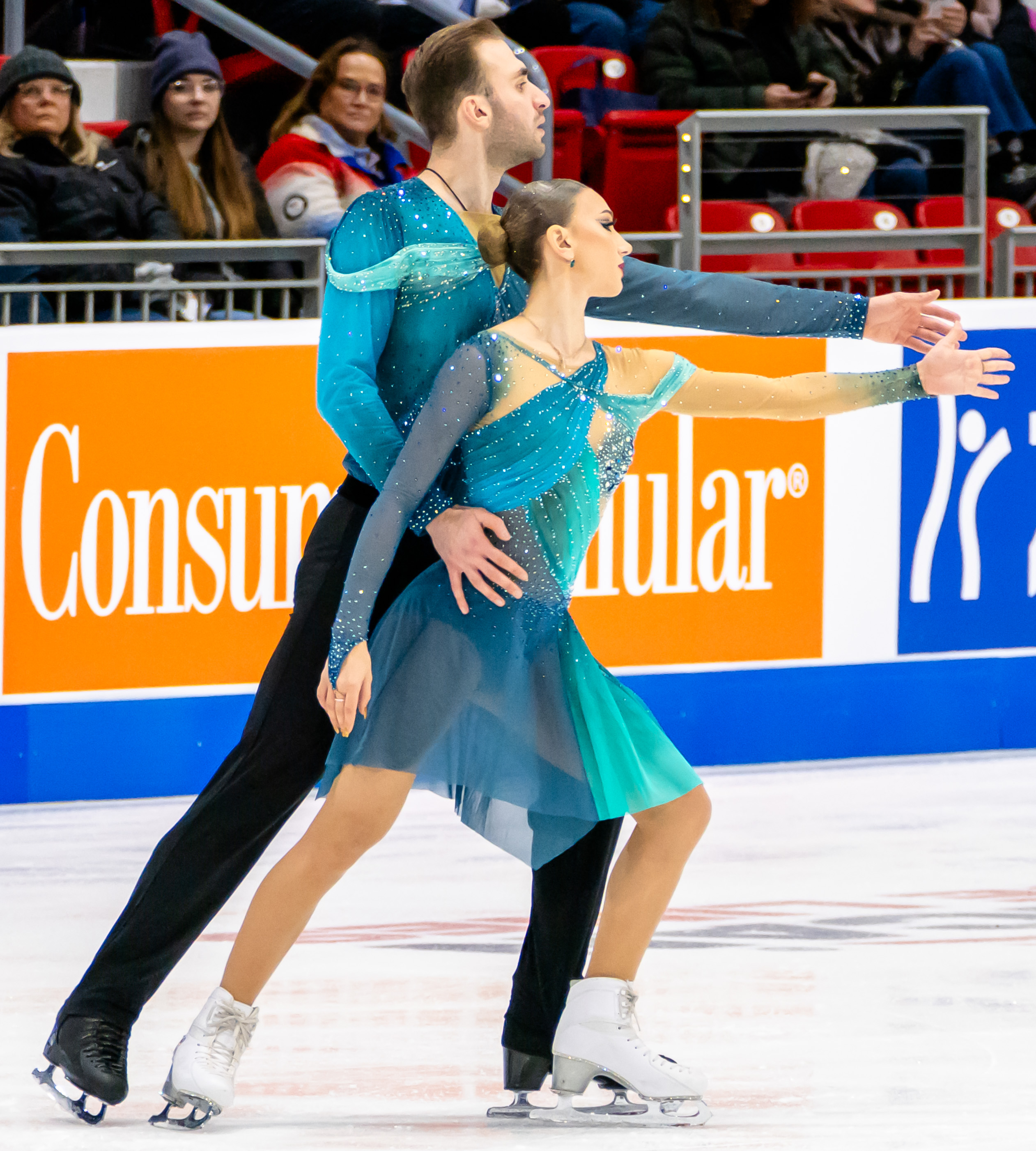
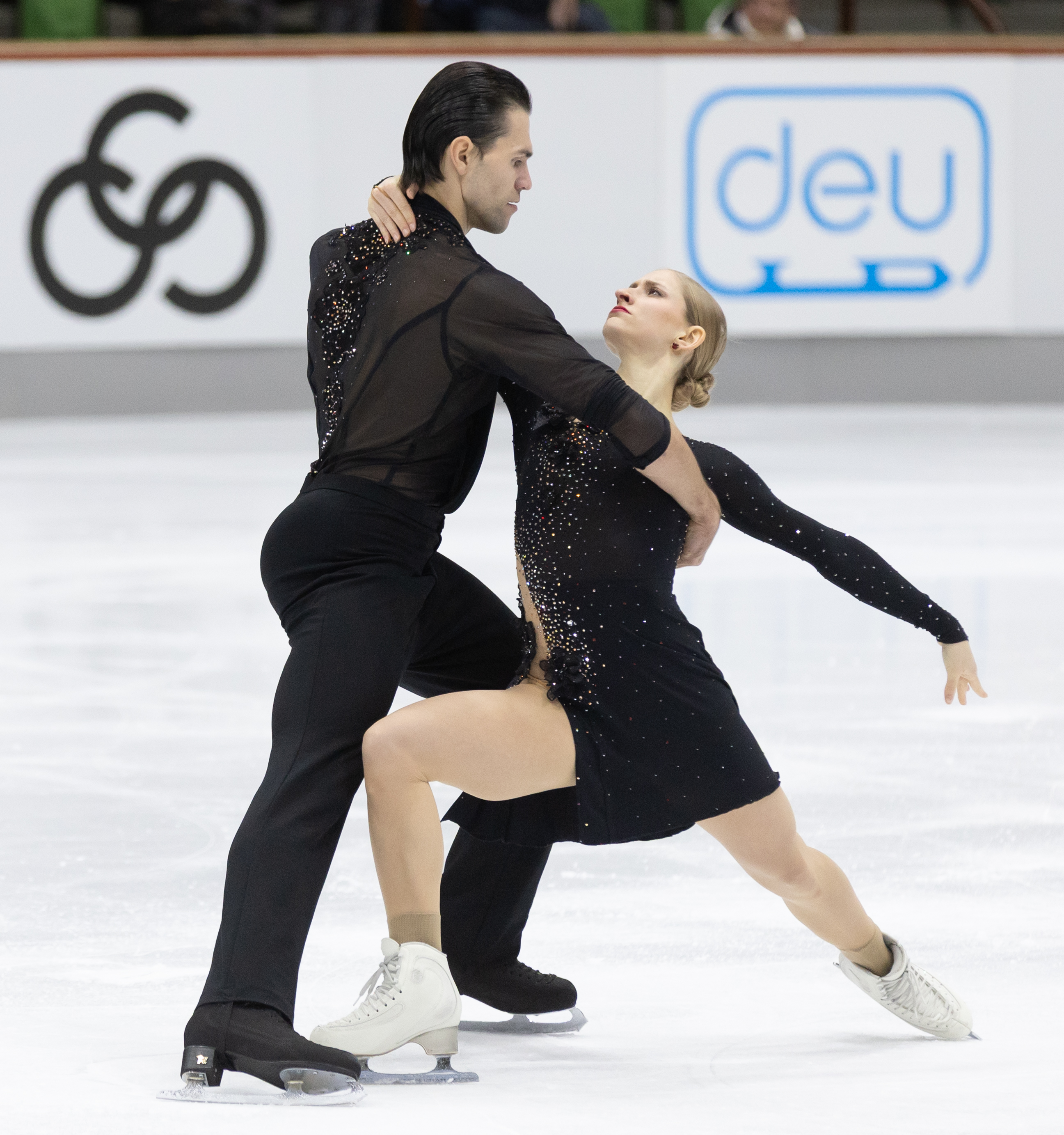
The gold, silver, and bronze medalists from the pairs event at the 2026 Winter Olympics (from left to right):
Riku Miura and Ryuichi Kihara of Japan (gold); Anastasiia Metelkina and Luka Berulava of Georgia (silver); and Minerva Fabienne Hase and Nikita Volodin of Germany (bronze)

Code key

- TSS – Total Segment Score
- TES – Total Elements Score
- PCS – Program Component Score
- CO – Composition
- PR – Presentation
- SS – Skating skills
- DED – Deductions

=== Short program ===
The pairs short program was held on 15 February. Minerva Fabienne Hase and Nikita Volodin of Germany finished in first place, scoring a new personal-best score of 80.01, which was three points higher than their previous personal best. Hase and Volodin's score was five points ahead of Anastasiia Metelkina and Luka Berulava of Georgia. Metelkina and Berulava had a small error on their throw triple flip and finished in second place, while Lia Pereira and Trennt Michaud of Canada finished in third place. Riku Miura and Ryuichi Kihara of Japan, who had been projected as the favorites to win the pairs event, finished in fifth place, seven points behind Hase and Volodin, after a mistake on a lift. Speaking afterward, Kihara said: "I’m not sure what happened, but it is what it is. We have to think positive. But it’s not like we’re in bad form, so tomorrow, we hope to be our usual selves." Meanwhile, Deanna Stellato-Dudek and Maxime Deschamps of Canada finished in fourteenth place after Deschamps failed to properly land his triple toe loop and Stellato-Dudek lost her balance coming out of a lift.

Pairs short program results
Pl.	Team	Nation	TSS	TES	PCS	CO	PR	SS	DED
1	Minerva Fabienne Hase; Nikita Volodin	Germany	80.01	43.91	36.10	9.07	9.14	8.93	0.00
2	Anastasiia Metelkina; Luka Berulava	Georgia	75.46	41.45	34.01	8.50	8.46	8.61	0.00
3	Lia Pereira; Trennt Michaud	Canada	74.60	42.20	32.40	8.04	8.32	8.00	0.00
4	Maria Pavlova; Alexei Sviatchenko	Hungary	73.87	41.34	32.53	8.18	8.07	8.21	0.00
5	Riku Miura; Ryuichi Kihara	Japan	73.11	38.14	34.97	8.93	8.57	8.79	0.00
6	Sui Wenjing; Han Cong	China	72.66	39.28	33.38	8.43	8.46	8.21	0.00
7	Ellie Kam; Daniel O'Shea	United States	71.87	38.81	33.06	8.32	8.39	8.14	0.00
8	Sara Conti; Niccolò Macii	Italy	71.70	37.22	34.48	8.68	8.71	8.54	0.00
9	Emily Chan; Spencer Akira Howe	United States	70.06	39.00	31.06	7.89	7.86	7.61	0.00
10	Rebecca Ghilardi; Filippo Ambrosini	Italy	69.08	38.29	30.79	7.79	7.86	7.50	0.00
11	Annika Hocke; Robert Kunkel	Germany	67.52	37.72	29.80	7.36	7.54	7.50	0.00
12	Karina Akopova; Nikita Rakhmanin	Armenia	66.27	38.16	28.11	6.89	7.00	7.25	0.00
13	Anastasia Vaipan-Law; Luke Digby	Great Britain	66.07	36.99	29.08	7.36	7.32	7.18	0.00
14	Deanna Stellato-Dudek; Maxime Deschamps	Canada	66.04	34.97	32.07	8.18	7.93	8.00	1.00
15	Ioulia Chtchetinina; Michał Woźniak	Poland	65.23	36.58	28.65	7.11	7.39	7.04	0.00
16	Camille Kovalev; Pavel Kovalev	France	64.65	35.99	28.66	7.32	7.11	7.11	0.00
17	Daria Danilova; Michel Tsiba	Netherlands	64.07	36.87	27.20	6.71	6.86	6.89	0.00
18	Anastasiia Golubeva; Hektor Giotopoulos Moore	Australia	60.69	32.85	27.84	7.04	6.93	6.96	0.00
19	Yuna Nagaoka; Sumitada Moriguchi	Japan	59.62	31.46	30.16	7.68	7.25	7.75	2.00

=== Free skating ===
The pairs free skating was held on 16 February. After finishing in fifth place after the short program, Riku Miura and Ryuichi Kihara rallied back to a first-place finish, beating Anastasiia Metelkina and Luka Berulava by over nine points, setting a new world record in the free skate and winning Japan's first ever Olympic medal in pair skating. "We still can't believe that this has happened after yesterday's performance [in the short program]," Kihara said. "We were quite disappointed... but we're really happy with how we skated today. It's a little bit of a disbelief that we were able to get a medal for Japan in pair skating for the first time ever."

Metelkina and Berulava finished in second place; their silver medals were the first Winter Olympic medals in Georgian history. "It's the best day in my life," Berulava said afterward. "Amazing moment for my country." Minerva Fabienne Hase and Nikita Volodin of Germany began the free skate with some errors on their side-by-side Salchows, but finished their performance successfully, winning the bronze. "It's a medal at the Olympics. I think it doesn't matter which color; it's just an amazing effort we put out there," Hase stated. "We fought to the end... We didn't stop after the big mistake on the Salchow, and we can bring home a bronze medal on our first Olympics together."

Maria Pavlova and Alexei Sviatchenko of Hungary delivered another consistent performance, finishing in third place in the free skate and fourth overall. Sui Wenjing and Han Cong of China, who were the reigning Olympic champions, finished in fifth place. Deanna Stellato-Dudek and Maxime Deschamps of Canada finished the competition in eleventh place. Speaking about her Olympic appearance, Stellato-Dudek commented: "Ironically, back in Italy, because that was the Olympics I was going for originally in 2006 [in Turin], so it's very ironic that it came full circle, and twenty years later, I'm back, perhaps where I belonged."

Pairs free skate results
Pl.	Team	Nation	TSS	TES	PCS	CO	PR	SS	DED
1	Riku Miura; Ryuichi Kihara	Japan	158.13	82.73	75.40	9.46	9.32	9.46	0.00
2	Anastasiia Metelkina; Luka Berulava	Georgia	146.29	76.28	70.01	8.79	8.68	8.75	0.00
3	Maria Pavlova; Alexei Sviatchenko	Hungary	141.39	75.50	65.89	8.32	8.11	8.25	0.00
4	Minerva Fabienne Hase; Nikita Volodin	Germany	139.08	69.82	69.26	8.79	8.54	8.61	0.00
5	Sui Wenjing; Han Cong	China	135.98	68.59	67.39	8.46	8.39	8.39	0.00
6	Sara Conti; Niccolò Macii	Italy	131.49	64.26	67.23	8.46	8.29	8.43	0.00
7	Emily Chan; Spencer Akira Howe	United States	130.25	68.50	62.75	7.82	7.89	7.79	1.00
8	Annika Hocke; Robert Kunkel	Germany	126.59	66.95	60.64	7.50	7.64	7.57	1.00
9	Deanna Stellato-Dudek; Maxime Deschamps	Canada	126.57	61.75	64.82	8.18	8.14	7.96	0.00
10	Lia Pereira; Trennt Michaud	Canada	125.06	62.83	63.23	8.07	7.75	7.86	1.00
11	Rebecca Ghilardi; Filippo Ambrosini	Italy	122.78	62.33	60.45	7.64	7.64	7.36	0.00
12	Ellie Kam; Daniel O'Shea	United States	122.71	60.82	63.89	8.14	7.75	8.04	2.00
13	Ioulia Chtchetinina; Michał Woźniak	Poland	120.63	63.33	57.30	7.21	7.21	7.04	0.00
14	Karina Akopova; Nikita Rakhmanin	Armenia	114.39	59.88	55.51	7.04	6.75	7.00	1.00
15	Camille Kovalev; Pavel Kovalev	France	113.78	58.71	56.07	7.00	7.00	7.00	1.00
16	Anastasia Vaipan-Law; Luke Digby	Great Britain	112.99	55.96	57.03	7.32	7.04	7.00	0.00

=== Overall ===
Pairs results
Rank	Team	Nation	Total	SP		FS	
1st place, gold medalist(s)	Riku Miura; Ryuichi Kihara	Japan	231.24	5	73.11	1	158.13
2nd place, silver medalist(s)	Anastasiia Metelkina; Luka Berulava	Georgia	221.75	2	75.46	2	146.29
3rd place, bronze medalist(s)	Minerva Fabienne Hase; Nikita Volodin	Germany	219.09	1	80.01	4	139.08
4	Maria Pavlova; Alexei Sviatchenko	Hungary	215.26	4	73.87	3	141.39
5	Sui Wenjing; Han Cong	China	208.64	6	72.66	5	135.98
6	Sara Conti; Niccolò Macii	Italy	203.19	8	71.70	6	131.49
7	Emily Chan; Spencer Akira Howe	United States	200.31	9	70.06	7	130.25
8	Lia Pereira; Trennt Michaud	Canada	199.66	3	74.60	10	125.06
9	Ellie Kam; Daniel O'Shea	United States	194.58	7	71.87	12	122.71
10	Annika Hocke; Robert Kunkel	Germany	194.11	11	67.52	8	126.59
11	Deanna Stellato-Dudek; Maxime Deschamps	Canada	192.61	14	66.04	9	126.57
12	Rebecca Ghilardi; Filippo Ambrosini	Italy	191.86	10	69.08	11	122.78
13	Ioulia Chtchetinina; Michał Woźniak	Poland	185.86	15	65.23	13	120.63
14	Karina Akopova; Nikita Rakhmanin	Armenia	180.66	12	66.27	14	114.39
15	Anastasia Vaipan-Law; Luke Digby	Great Britain	179.06	13	66.07	16	112.99
16	Camille Kovalev; Pavel Kovalev	France	178.43	16	64.65	15	113.78
17	Daria Danilova; Michel Tsiba	Netherlands	64.07	17	64.07	Did not advance to free skate	
18	Anastasiia Golubeva; Hektor Giotopoulos Moore	Australia	60.69	18	60.69	Did not advance to free skate	
19	Yuna Nagaoka; Sumitada Moriguchi	Japan	59.62	19	59.62	Did not advance to free skate	

== Records ==
The following new record high score was set during this event.

Record high scores
Date	Team	Segment	Score	Ref.
16 February	(Japan); Riku Miura; Ryuichi Kihara	Free skate	158.13	

== Works cited ==
- "Special Regulations & Technical Rules – Single & Pair Skating and Ice Dance 2024" (PDF). International Skating Union. Archived (PDF) from the original on 3 June 2025.
