= 2026 Cup of China =

Figure skating competition

- Type: Grand Prix
- Date: 6 – 8 November
- Season: 2026–27
- Location: Shenzhen, China
- Host: Chinese Skating Association
- Venue: Shenzhen Universiade Sports Centre

Champions
- Men's singles: (Japan) Kao Miura
- Women's singles: (Japan) Mone Chiba
- Pairs: (Individual Neutral Athletes) Anastasia Mishina and Aleksandr Galliamov
- Ice dance: (United Kingdom) Lilah Fear and Lewis Gibson
- Previous: 2025 Cup of China
- Next: 2027 Cup of China
- Previous Grand Prix: 2026 Skate Canada International
- Next Grand Prix: 2026 Skate America

The 2026 Cup of China is a figure skating competition sanctioned by the International Skating Union (ISU). Organized and hosted by the Chinese Skating Association (simplified Chinese: 中国滑冰协会; traditional Chinese: 中國滑冰協會), it is the third event of the 2026–27 ISU Grand Prix of Figure Skating: a senior-level international invitational competition series. It was held from the 6^{th} to 8^{th} of November at the Shenzhen Universiade Sports Centre in Shenzhen, China. Medals will be awarded in men's singles, women's singles, pair skating, and ice dance. Skaters earn points based on their results, and the top skaters or teams in each discipline at the end of the season will be invited to then compete at the 2026–27 Grand Prix Final in Chongqing, China. Skaters can earn points towards the World Standings and Season's World Ranking based on their results.

Kao Miura of Japan won the men's event, Mone Chiba of Japan won the women's event, Anastasia Mishina and Aleksandr Galliamov of Russia, competing as Individual Neutral Athletes, won the pairs event, and Lilah Fear and Lewis Gibson of Great Britain won the ice dance event.

== Background ==
The ISU Grand Prix of Figure Skating is a series of seven events sanctioned by the International Skating Union (ISU) and held during the autumn: six qualifying events and the Grand Prix of Figure Skating Final. This allows skaters to perfect their programs earlier in the season, as well as compete against the skaters whom they would later encounter at the World Championships. Skaters earn points based on their results in their respective competitions and after the six qualifying events, the top skaters or teams in each discipline are invited to compete at the Grand Prix Final. The Cup of China debuted as a Grand Prix event in 2003 as a replacement for the Bofrost Cup on Ice.

The 2026 Cup of China is the third event of the 2026–27 Grand Prix of Figure Skating series, and is held from 6 to 8 November at the Shenzhen Universiade Sports Centre in Shenzhen, China.

== Entries ==
The International Skating Union published the initial list of entrants on 16 June 2026.

Country	Men	Women	Pairs	Ice dance
Armenia	—N/a		Karina Akopova; Nikita Rakhmanin	—N/a
Austria	—N/a	Olga Mikutina	—N/a	
Canada	—N/a		Jazmine Desrochers; Kieran Thrasher	—N/a
China	Chen Yudong	Zhang Ruiyang	Zhang Jiaxuan; Huang Yihang	Ren Junfei; Xing Jianing
China	Peng Zhiming	Zhu Yi	—N/a	Xiao Zixi; He Linghao
China	—N/a			Lin Yunfei; Gao Zijian
Czech Republic	—N/a			Natálie Taschlerová; Filip Taschler
France	—N/a			Loïcia Demougeot; Théo le Mercier
Georgia	Nika Egadze	Anastasiia Gubanova	Anastasiia Metelkina; Luka Berulava	Diana Davis; Gleb Smolkin
Great Britain	—N/a			Lilah Fear; Lewis Gibson
Italy	—N/a	Lara Naki Gutmann	—N/a	
Japan	Kao Miura	Mone Chiba	Yuna Nagaoka; Sumitada Moriguchi	—N/a
Japan	Shun Sato	Mako Yamashita	—N/a	—N/a
Japan	—N/a	Rinka Watanabe	—N/a	—N/a
Kazakhstan	Mikhail Shaidorov	—N/a		
South Korea	Seo Min-kyu	Lee Hae-in	—N/a	
Poland	Vladimir Samoilov	—N/a		
Spain	—N/a			Olivia Smart; Tim Dieck
United States	Lucius Kazanecki	Alina Bonillo	Chelsea Liu; Ryan Bedard	Emily Bratti; Ian Somerville
United States	Jacob Sanchez	Sophie Joline von Felten	Valentina Plazas; Maximiliano Fernandez	Eva Pate; Logan Bye
(Individual Neutral Athletes) Individual Neutral Athlete	Vladislav Dikidzhi	Alexandra Ignatova	Aleksandr Galliamov; Anastasia Mishina	—N/a
(Individual Neutral Athletes) Individual Neutral Athlete	Evgeni Semenenko	—N/a		

=== Changes to preliminary entries ===
Discipline	Withdrew		Added		Notes	Ref.
Discipline	Date	Skater(s)	Date	Skater(s)	Notes	Ref.
Men	17 August	(Latvia); Deniss Vasiļjevs	2 September	(Poland); Vladimir Samoilov	Taking season off	
Men	—N/a		4 September	(China); Zhiming Peng	Host picks	
Women	—N/a		4 September	(China); Zhu Yi	Host picks	
Ice dance	—N/a		4 September	(China); Yufei Lin; Zijian Gao	Host picks	
Men	—N/a		9 September	(Individual Neutral Athletes); Vladislav Dikidzhi		
Men	12 October	(South Korea); Cha Jun-hwan	15 October	(Individual Neutral Athletes); Evgeni Semenenko	Cha taking season off	
Women	14 October	(South Korea); Kim Chae-yeon	15 October	(Individual Neutral Athletes); Alexandra Ignatova		
Pairs	21 October	(Austria); Gabriella Izzo; Luc Maierhofer	22 October	(Individual Neutral Athletes); Aleksandr Galliamov; Anastasia Mishina		

== Medalists ==
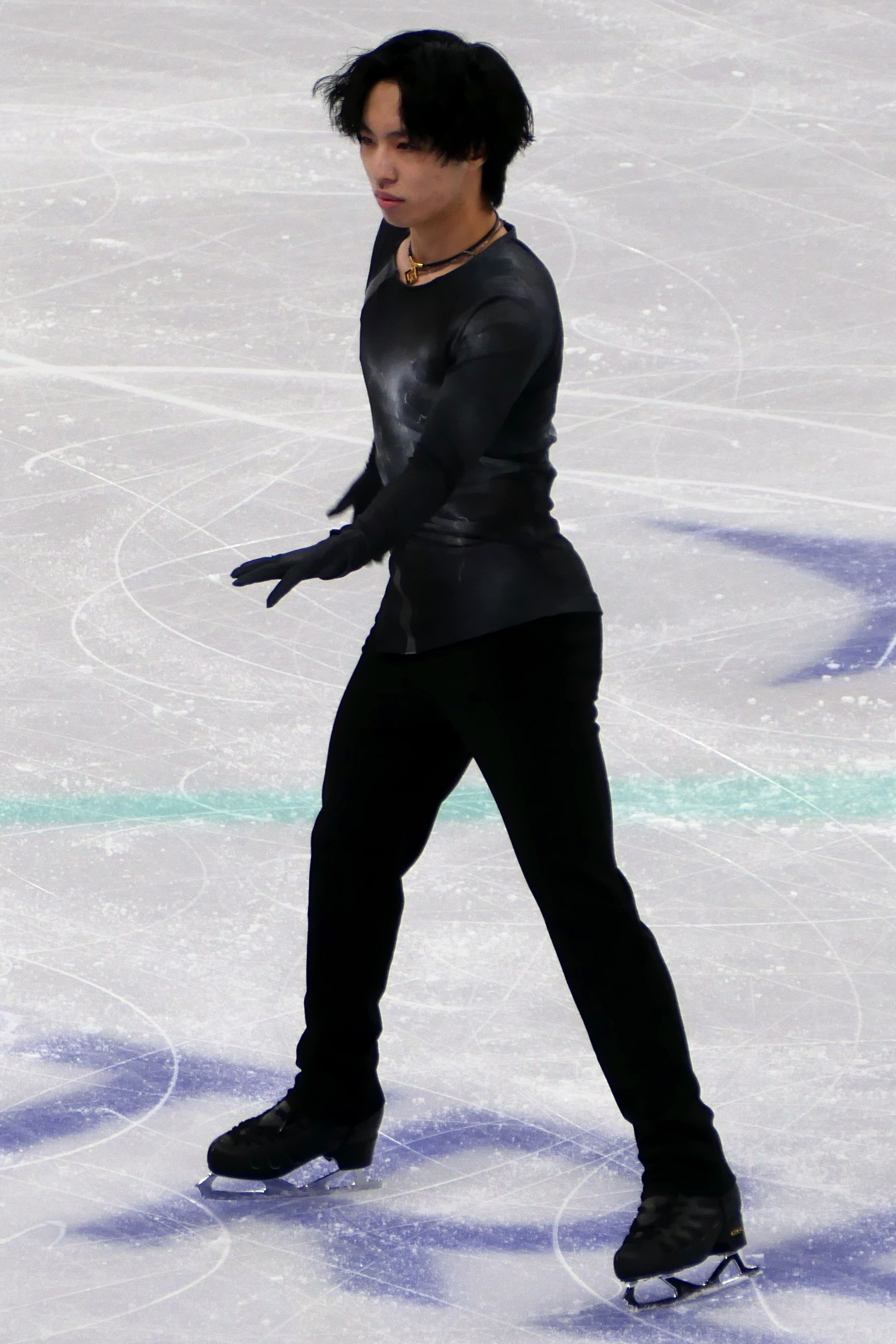
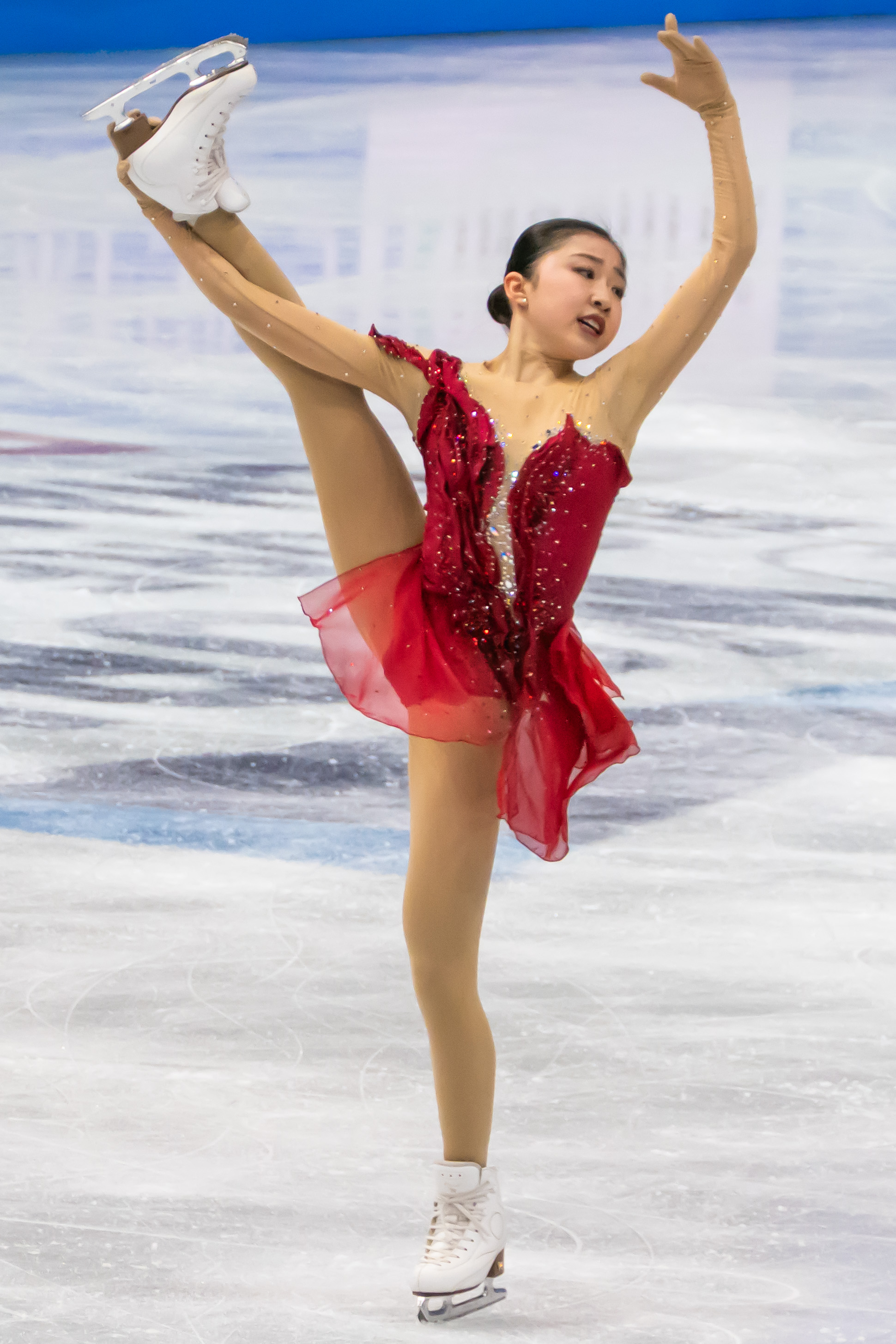
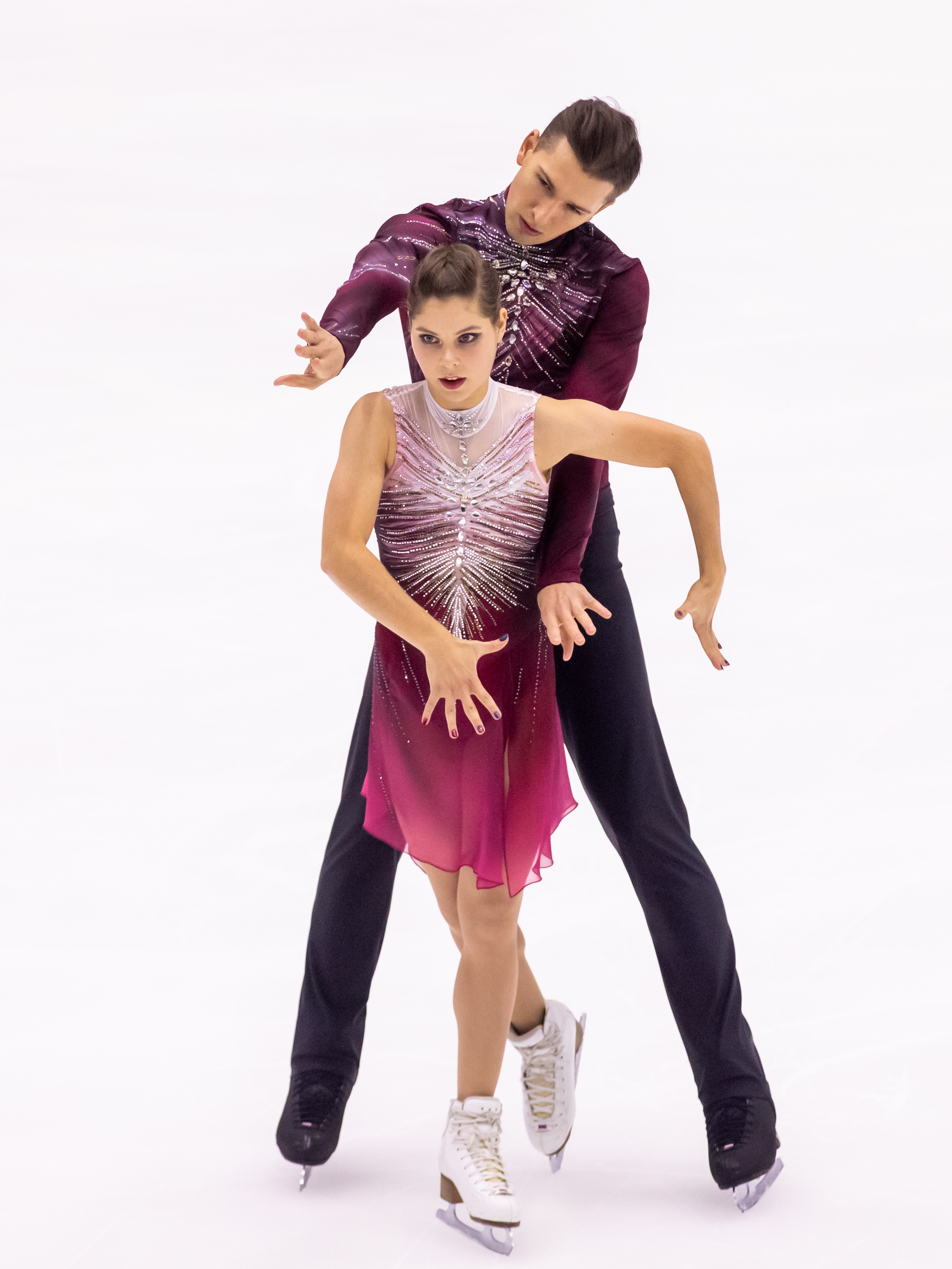
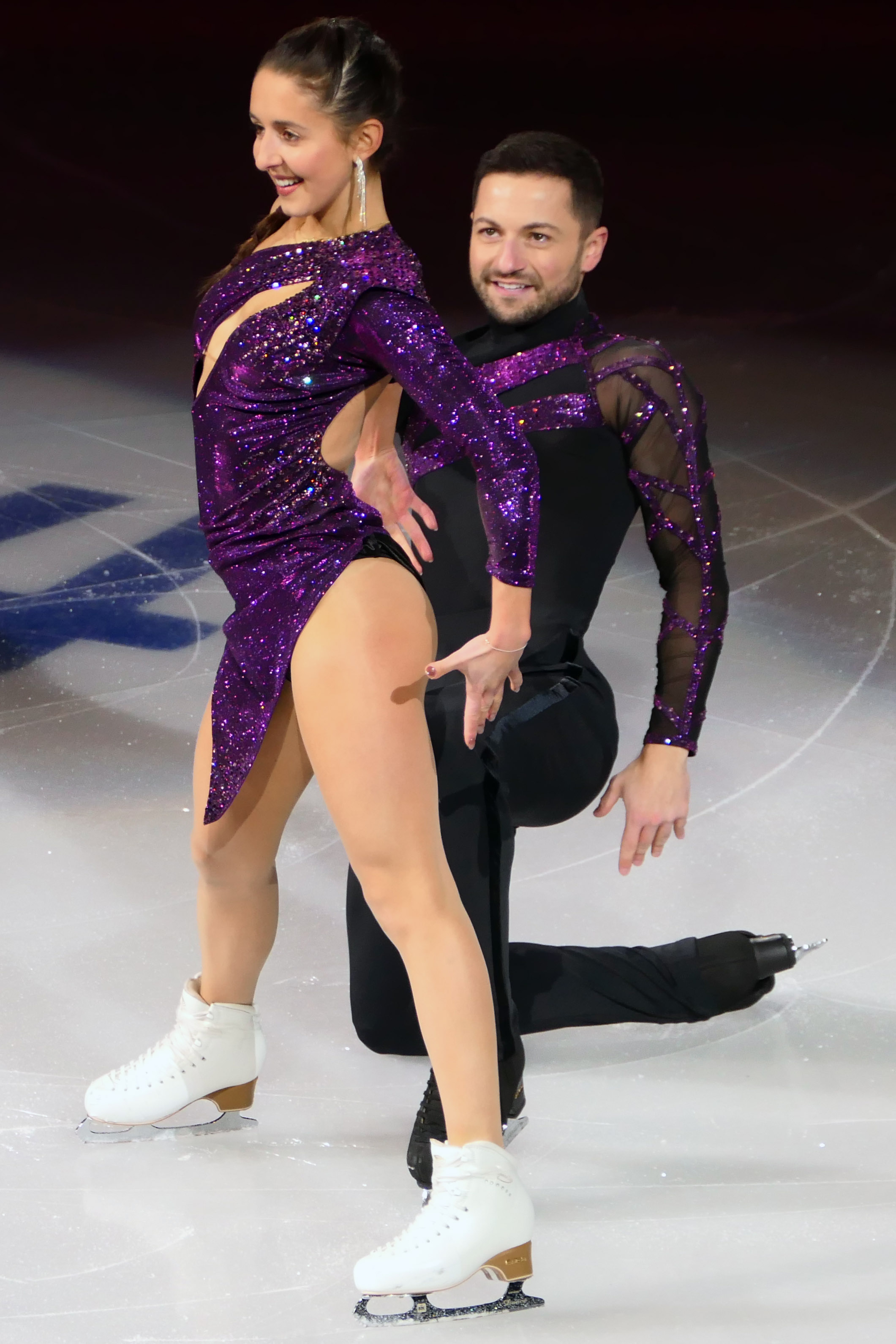
The reigning Cup of China champions (from left to right): Kao Miura of Japan (men's singles); Mone Chiba of Japan (women's singles); Anastasia Mishina and Aleksandr Galliamov of Russia (pair skating); and Lilah Fear and Lewis Gibson of Great Britain (ice dance)

Medalists
Discipline	Gold	Silver	Bronze
Men	(Japan); Kao Miura	(Individual Neutral Athletes); Vladislav Dikidzhi	(Individual Neutral Athletes); Evgeni Semenenko
Women	(Japan); Mone Chiba	(Individual Neutral Athletes); Alexandra Ignatova	(South Korea) Lee Hae-in
Pairs	(Individual Neutral Athletes); Anastasia Mishina; Aleksandr Galliamov	(Georgia (country)); Anastasiia Metelkina; Luka Berulava	(Japan); Yuna Nagaoka; Sumitada Moriguchi
Ice dance	(United Kingdom); Lilah Fear; Lewis Gibson	(Georgia (country)); Diana Davis; Gleb Smolkin	(Spain); Olivia Smart; Tim Dieck

== Results ==
=== Men's singles ===
Men’s results
Rank	Skater	Nation	Total points	SP		FS	
1st place, gold medalist(s)	Kao Miura	Japan	293.25	1	102.90	1	190.35
2nd place, silver medalist(s)	Vladislav Dikidzhi	Individual Neutral Athletes	282.44	4	98.86	2	183.58
3rd place, bronze medalist(s)	Evgeni Semenenko	Individual Neutral Athletes	281.62	3	99.72	3	181.90
4	Shun Sato	Japan	277.20	2	101.97	4	175.23
5	Mikhail Shaidorov	Kazakhstan	263.49	5	94.87	6	168.62
6	Vladimir Samoilov	Poland	252.39	6	88.21	7	164.18
7	Seo Min-kyu	South Korea	249.14	10	79.77	5	169.37
8	Nika Egadze	Georgia	246.61	7	87.67	8	158.94
9	Chen Yudong	China	228.92	9	80.74	9	148.18
10	Peng Zhiming	China	220.40	8	87.65	10	132.75
11	Jacob Sanchez	United States	204.39	11	79.45	11	124.94
12	Lucius Kazanecki	United States	184.11	12	63.16	12	120.95

=== Women's singles ===
Women’s results
Rank	Skater	Nation	Total points	SP		FS	
1st place, gold medalist(s)	Mone Chiba	Japan	224.48	1	76.08	2	148.40
2nd place, silver medalist(s)	Alexandra Ignatova	Individual Neutral Athletes	221.27	3	72.37	1	148.90
3rd place, bronze medalist(s)	Lee Hae-in	South Korea	210.79	6	67.49	3	143.30
4	Anastasiia Gubanova	Georgia	208.58	2	75.05	4	133.53
5	Lara Naki Gutmann	Italy	202.69	4	71.76	5	130.93
6	Mako Yamashita	Japan	193.32	5	69.17	7	124.15
7	Sophie Joline von Felten	United States	189.21	9	60.19	6	129.02
8	Zhu Yi	China	180.47	7	64.58	8	115.89
9	Zhang Ruiyang	China	166.72	8	61.20	9	105.52
10	Olga Mikutina	Austria	157.86	12	55.41	10	102.45
11	Rinka Watanabe	Japan	154.86	11	55.72	11	99.14
12	Alina Bonillo	United States	150.32	10	59.30	12	91.02

=== Pairs ===
Pairs results
Rank	Skater	Nation	Total points	SP		FS	
1st place, gold medalist(s)	Anastasia Mishina; Aleksandr Galliamov	Individual Neutral Athletes	209.84	1	74.69	1	135.15
2nd place, silver medalist(s)	Anastasiia Metelkina; Luka Berulava	Georgia	198.27	2	67.06	2	131.21
3rd place, bronze medalist(s)	Yuna Nagaoka; Sumitada Moriguchi	Japan	181.50	4	63.06	3	118.44
4	Karina Akopova; Nikita Rakhmanin	Armenia	181.46	3	66.34	4	115.12
5	Chelsea Liu; Ryan Bedard	United States	163.02	5	62.71	5	100.31
6	Valentina Plazas; Maximiliano Fernandez	United States	158.19	6	59.48	7	98.71
7	Zhang Jiaxuan; Huang Yihang	China	156.10	8	56.52	6	99.58
8	Jazmine Desrochers; Kieran Thrasher	Canada	153.08	7	59.24	8	93.84

=== Ice dance ===
Ice dance results
Rank	Skater	Nation	Total points	SP		FS	
1st place, gold medalist(s)	Lilah Fear; Lewis Gibson	Great Britain	194.93	1	80.00	1	114.93
2nd place, silver medalist(s)	Diana Davis; Gleb Smolkin	Georgia	193.54	2	79.31	2	114.23
3rd place, bronze medalist(s)	Olivia Smart; Tim Dieck	Spain	178.30	5	70.98	3	107.32
4	Natálie Taschlerová; Filip Taschler	Czech Republic	178.21	3	73.10	5	105.11
5	Loïcia Demougeot; Théo le Mercier	France	176.94	4	71.41	4	105.53
6	Emily Bratti; Ian Somerville	United States	167.97	6	65.04	6	102.93
7	Eva Pate; Logan Bye	United States	161.04	7	64.84	7	96.20
8	Xiao Zixi; He Linghao	China	152.29	8	62.48	9	89.81
9	Ren Junfei; Xing Jianing	China	150.72	9	59.16	8	91.56
10	Lin Yufei; Gao Zijian	China	125.07	10	44.86	10	80.21

== Works cited ==
- "Sports Rules – Single & Pair Skating and Ice Dance" (PDF). International Skating Union. Archived (PDF) from the original on 24 May 2026.
