= Artsakh (song) =

Song by Ara Gevorgyan

from the album Ani
- Released: 1999
- Genre: Instrumental folk
- Length: 5:35
- Label: Eye Records

External audio
- Full version of Artsakh in Ara Gevorgyan's website

"Artsakh" (Armenian: «Արցախ») is an instrumental folk composition by Armenian contemporary composer Ara Gevorgyan, released in 1999 as part of his album Ani. The composition was written in 1997. In 1998, Gevorgyan registered the rights to all works from the album, including "Artsakh", with the United States Library of Congress.

The recording featured Ara Gevorgyan, the Armenian National Philharmonic Orchestra (ANPO), Djivan Gasparyan (duduk), and Norayr Sharoyan (dhol).

The piece became widely popular in Armenia and among the Armenian diaspora. Over the years, it has been performed at cultural and political events and has been used by figure skaters, gymnasts, and other athletes in international competitions.

Gevorgyan later released a documentary film titled Story about Artsakh Music, in which he discusses the history and creation of the piece.

== Name ==
Artsakh was one of the 15 provinces of the ancient Kingdom of Armenia. Today, the name "Artsakh" is still used for the Nagorno-Karabakh region of Azerbaijan which corresponds to this historical province by Armenians. The region where the Armenians were the majority achieved de facto independence which would last until 2023 alongside the Armenian forces during the bloody war with Azerbaijan in 1988-94. The war is seen by Armenians as liberation of their historic lands and the song is a tribute to the Armenian victory.

== Usage in sports ==
Parts of "Artsakh" have been used in sports, including:

Year	Athlete	Country	Sport	Event(s)	Ref
2001–02	Alexander Abt	Russia	Figure skating	All season long, including at the 2002 Winter Olympics	
2005–06	Elene Gedevanishvili	Georgia	Figure skating	All season long, including at the 2006 Winter Olympics	
2007	Dinara Gimatova	Azerbaijan	Gymnastics		
2007-08	Vazgen Azrojan; Anastasia Grebenkina	Armenia	Figure skating	Original dance	
2008	Aliya Yussupova	Kazakhstan	Gymnastics		
2009	Holon Israel	Israel	Figure skating		
2009	Vic Darchinyan	Armenia	Boxing	Entrance song	
2010	Dou Baobao	China	Gymnastics	2010 Corbeil-Essonnes International Rhythmic Gymnastics Tournament	
2010	Marta Koczkowska	Poland	Gymnastics	2009 Corbeil-Essonnes International Rhythmic Gymnastics Tournament	
2010	Giorgio Petrosyan	Italy	Kickboxing	Entrance song	
2013	Victoria Moors	Canada	Gymnastics	2013 AT&T American Cup	
2013	Gegard Mousasi	Netherlands	Kickboxing	Entrance song	
2014	Susianna Kentikian	Germany	Boxing	Entrance song	
2016	Seda Tutkhalyan	Russia	Gymnastics	All season long, including at the 2016 Summer Olympics	
2020-21	Adeliia Petrosian	Russia	Figure skating	All season long, including at the 2021 Russian Junior Championships	
2026	Karina Akopova and Nikita Rakhmanin	Armenia	Figure skating	All season long, including at the 2026 Winter Olympics	

Other

- (Armenia) Pan-Armenian Games
- (Russia) In a Russian TV show called "Ice Age" broadcast by the Channel One in 2007 Russian singer Aleksandra Savaleva and a Russian-born Israeli ice dancer Sergei Sakhnovski performed figure skating with this song.

== Controversy ==
In 2007 Azerbaijani ambassador in Russia and former singer Polad Bülbüloğlu alleged that "Artsakh" contains an Azerbaijani song. Ara Georgyan responded that Bülbüloğlu's statements were a result of confusion from an incident that occurred during one of the episodes of the Russian TV show "Ice Age" broadcast by Channel One. During the performance of Russian singer Aleksandra Savaleva (ru) and Israeli ice dancer Sergei Sakhnovski, it was initially announced that the song they were going to use was called "Armenian dance" by Ara Gevorgyan, but instead a song called "Sene de galmaz" by Azerbaijani composer Tofig Guliyev was played and only after that a small portion of "Artsakh" was played. Ara Gevorgyan suggested that Azerbaijanis tried to justify Dinara Gimatova's use of the song without his permission in a 2005 grand-prix.
