= Ara Gevorgyan =

Armenian musician and composer (born 1960)

- Born: April 19, 1960 (age 65); Yerevan, Soviet Armenia
- Genres: Pop, Folk, Fusion, World music
- Occupation: Composer
- Instruments: Piano, synthesizer, keyboard
- Years active: 1983–present
- Website: www.aragevorgyan.com

Ara Gevorgyan (Armenian: Արա Գևորգյան, born April 19, 1960) is an Armenian musician, composer and musical producer. In 2004 he was awarded the Honorary Artist of Armenia title by the President Robert Kocharyan.

== Biography ==
Gevorgyan is the son of Armenian folk-singer Valya Samvelyan. He studied at School #31 of Yerevan and at the A. Tigranyan Musical School at the same time. During the two years he studied at Yerevan #8 college of Fine Arts. From 1983 to 1987 he studied at Armenian State Pedagogical University at the faculty of woodwind instruments and pop music department. In 1987-1989 Gevorgyan taught conducting at the same Institute, then he worked at Armenian Television ("3 Alik" TV program).

In 1983 he founded the "Rally" Armenian pop-rock band, the participant of "Song-85" festival.

He participated in the Opening Ceremony of the Cultural Year of Armenia in Russia hosted at the Moscow Kremlin Music Hall and honored by the presence of the presidents of Armenia and Russia Robert Kocharyan and Vladimir Putin respectively and the famous French-Armenian singer Charles Aznavour.

Ara Gevorgyan co-operates with Jivan Gasparyan, Ian Gillan, Demis Roussos, Pedro Eustache, Daniel Decker and others. Among his most popular songs are "Adana", "Artsakh", "Ov Hayots Ashkharh" and "Ovkyanosits ayn koghm". Gevorgyan also composed the music for Russian prima ballerina Anastasia Volochkova's "Golden cage" ballet dedicated to the Bolshoi Theater.

He is married, has a daughter and a son.

He has been awarded by the "Mikhail Lomonosov" Russian medal and the gold medal of the Ministry of Culture of Armenia.

== Discography ==
=== CDs ===
- 1995 «Օվկիանոսից այն կողմ» (Over the ocean)
- 1997 «Կարոտ» (Nostalgie)
- 1999 «Անի (Ani) (a prize winner of Armenian Music Awards in the US)
- 2001 «Խոր Վիրապ» (Khor Virap) (a prize winner of Armenian Music Awards in the US).
- 2005 «Ադանա» (Adana)
- 2009 «Վաղարշապատ» (Vagharshapat) (a prize winner of Armenian Music Awards in the US).
- 2010 "The Best of Ara Gevorgyan"

== DVDs ==
- 1999 "Live in Alex Theater", Los Angeles, EYE Records
- 2002 "My Sardarapat", live in Armenia
- 2003 "Ov Hayots Ashkhar"
- 2007 "Live in Kremlin", Moscow, Russia
- 2009 "Live in Citadel", Aleppo, Syria
- 2009 "The Best of Ara Gevorgyan
