= 2026–27 figure skating season =

Competitive figure skating year, 2026/7/1 to 2027/6/30

- Date: July 1, 2026 – June 30, 2027
- Previous: 2025–26
- Next: 2027–28

The 2026–27 figure skating season began on July 1, 2026, and will end on June 30, 2027. During this season, elite skaters will compete at the ISU (International Skating Union) Championship level at the 2027 European Championships, Four Continents Championships, World Junior Championships, and World Championships. They will also compete at elite events such as the ISU Challenger Series as well as the Grand Prix and Junior Grand Prix series, culminating at the Grand Prix Final. Skaters can earn points towards the World Standings and Season's World Ranking based on their competition results.

On June 30, 2026, the ISU announced that figure skaters from Russia and Belarus would be allowed to compete at international competitions as Individual Neutral Athletes (AINs). Each of these skaters were required to undergo an individual assessment conducted by the ISU Council to determine whether they met the criteria for neutral status. These requirements included having not previously taken active part in military operations in the war against Ukraine, as well as having not actively and publicly supported the war. As AINs, Russian and Belarusian skaters were required to compete without items of state recognition such as their national flags or anthems. Russian and Belarusian officials are not permitted to attend international competitions.

== Season notes ==
=== Age eligibility ===
Skaters are eligible to compete in ISU events at the junior or senior levels according to their age. These rules may not apply to non-ISU events such as national championships.

Level	Date of birth
Junior (singles)	Born between July 1, 2007 & June 30, 2013
Junior (ice dance & females in pairs)	Born between July 1, 2005 & June 30, 2013
Junior (males in pairs)	Born between July 1, 2003 & June 30, 2013
Senior (all disciplines)	Born before July 1, 2009

== Changes ==
If skaters of different nationalities form a team, the ISU requires that they choose one country to represent. The date provided is the date when the change occurred or, if not available, the date when the change was announced.

=== Partnership changes ===
Date	Skaters	Disc.	Type	Notes	Ref.
July 28, 2026	(South Korea); Hannah Kim; Ye Quan	Ice dance	Formed	For South Korea	
August 25, 2026	(Lithuania); Ksenia Šipunova; Deividas Kizala	Ice dance	Formed	For Lithuania	
August 25, 2026	(Egypt); Sophia Anwy Farajallah; Maksym Spodyriev	Ice dance	Formed	For Egypt	
August 27, 2026	(United States); Deanna Stellato-Dudek; Danil Siianytsia	Pairs	Formed	For United States	
September 4, 2026	(Hungary); Júlia Láng; Filippo Clerici	Pairs	Formed	For Hungary	
September 5, 2026	(Hungary); Júlía Sylvía Gunnarsdóttir; Mozes Jozsef Berei	Pairs	Formed	For Hungary	
October 4, 2026	(United States); Vanessa Pham; Anton Spiridonov	Ice dance	Split		
October 28, 2026	(Germany); Elizabeth Tkachenko; Michail Savitskiy	Ice dance	Formed	For Germany	
November 2, 2026	(Italy); Milania Väänänen; Filippo Ambrosini	Pairs	Split		

=== Retirements ===
Date	Skater(s)	Disc.	Ref.
July 7, 2026	(Canada); Maxime Deschamps	Pairs	
July 10, 2026	(United Kingdom); Anastasia Vaipan-Law	Pairs	
July 31, 2026	(Austria); Sophia Schaller; Livio Mayr	Pairs	
August 16, 2026	(United Kingdom) Nina Povey	Women	
August 19, 2026	(Finland) Nella Pelkonen	Women	
August 28, 2026	(Sweden); Greta Crafoord	Pairs	

=== Coaching changes ===
Date	Skater(s)	Disc.	From	To	Ref.
July 6, 2026	(Canada); Wesley Chiu	Men	Keegan Murphy & Eileen Murphy	Brian Orser & Tracy Wilson	
August 1, 2026	(China); Wang Yihan	Women	Gao Weijun & Sofia Fedchenko	Gao Weijun & Satoko Miyahara	
August 3, 2026	(Germany); Annika Hocke; Robert Kunkel	Pairs	Ondřej Hotárek, Luca Demattè & Nolan Seegert	Nolan Seegert	
August 10, 2026	(South Korea); Huh Ji-yu	Women	Chi Hyun-jung & Ji Min-ji	Choi Hyung-kyung, Kim Na-hyun & Kim Min-seok	
August 26, 2026	(Individual Neutral Athletes); Adeliia Petrosian	Women	Eteri Tutberidze, Sergei Dudakov & Daniil Gleikhengauz	Inna Goncharenko	
October 19, 2026	(Russia); Kamila Valieva	Women	Svetlana Sokolovskaya	Eteri Tutberidze, Sergei Dudakov & Daniil Gleikhengauz	
November 14, 2026	(Belgium); Nina Pinzarrone	Women	Damon Allen, Tammy Gambill & Logan Giulietti-Schmitt.	Jorik Hendrickx	
November 20, 2026	(Kazakhstan); Mikhail Shaidorov	Men	Alexei Urmanov	TBD	

=== Nationality changes ===
Date	Skater(s)	Disc.	From	To	Notes	Ref.
July 4, 2026	Nathan Bartholomay	Pairs	United States	Canada	Partnering with Charlene Bailey	
July 9, 2026	Marko Jevgeni Gaidajenko	Ice dance	Estonia	Canada	Partnering with Alicia Fabbri	
August 25, 2026	Maksym Spodyriev	Ice dance	Poland	Egypt	Partnering with Sophia Anwy Farajallah	
August 27, 2026	Deanna Stellato-Dudek	Pairs	Canada	United States	Partnering with Danil Siianytsia	
September 4, 2026	Filippo Clerici	Pairs	Finland	Hungary	Partnering with Júlia Láng	
September 5, 2026	Júlía Sylvía Gunnarsdóttir	Pairs	Iceland	Hungary	Partnering with Mozes Jozsef Berei	
October 1, 2026	Luc Economides	Men	France	Romania		
October 28, 2026	Elizabeth Tkachenko	Women	Israel	Germany	Partnering with Michail Savitskiy	

== International competitions ==
Scheduled competitions:

Code key

- S – Senior event
- J – Junior event
- N – Novice event
- M – Men's singles
- W – Women's singles
- P – Pair skating
- D – Ice dance

Color key

- ISU Championships
- Grand Prix or Junior Grand Prix
- Challenger Series
- Other competition

2026
Dates	Event	Type	Level	Disc.	Location	Ref.
July 27–30	Lake Placid Ice Dance International	Other	S/J	D	Lake Placid, New York, United States	
August 1–5	Asian Open Trophy	Other	All	M/W/P	Jakarta, Indonesia	
August 5–9	Cranberry Cup International	Challenger Series	S	M/W	Norwood, Massachusetts, United States	
August 5–9	Cranberry Cup International	Other	J/N	M/W	Norwood, Massachusetts, United States	
August 20–22	JGP China	Junior Grand Prix	J	All	Xi'an, China	
August 27–29	JGP Latvia	Junior Grand Prix	J	All	Riga, Latvia	
September 3–4	Bolero Cup	Other	All	D	Sheffield, England, United Kingdom	
September 3–5	JGP Thailand	Junior Grand Prix	J	M/W/D	Bangkok, Thailand	
September 4–6	Kinoshita Group Cup	Challenger Series	S	All	Tokyo, Japan	
September 10–12	John Nicks Pairs Competition	Challenger Series	S	P	Norwood, Massachusetts, United States	
September 10–12	John Nicks Pairs Competition	Other	J/N	P	Norwood, Massachusetts, United States	
September 11–13	Tallinn Open	Other	S/J	M/W	Tallinn, Estonia	
September 17–19	JGP Turkey	Junior Grand Prix	J	All	Ankara, Turkey	
September 17–20	Lombardia Trophy	Challenger Series	S	M/W/D	Bergamo, Italy	
September 17–20	Lombardia Trophy	Other	S	P	Bergamo, Italy	
September 24–26	JGP Georgia	Junior Grand Prix	J	M/W/D	Batumi, Georgia	
September 24–26	Nebelhorn Trophy	Challenger Series	S	All	Oberstdorf, Germany	
September 24–27	Nepela Memorial	Challenger Series	S	M/W/D	Bratislava, Slovakia	
September 24–27	Nepela Memorial	Other	S	P	Bratislava, Slovakia	
September 26–30	Swan Trophy	Other	All	M/W	Bibra Lake, Australia	
October 1–3	JGP Slovenia	Junior Grand Prix	J	M/W/D	Ljubljana, Slovenia	
October 1–4	Trialeti Trophy	Challenger Series	S	All	Batumi, Georgia	
October 7–11	Denis Ten Memorial Challenge	Challenger Series	S	M/W/D	Astana, Kazakhstan	
October 7–11	Denis Ten Memorial Challenge	Other	J	M/W/D	Astana, Kazakhstan	
October 8–10	JGP Poland	Junior Grand Prix	J	All	Gdańsk, Poland	
October 10–11	Tayside Trophy	Other	S/J	M/W/P	Dundee, Scotland, United Kingdom	
October 15–18	Budapest Trophy	Challenger Series	S	M/W/D	Budapest, Hungary	
October 15–18	Budapest Trophy	Other	S	P	Budapest, Hungary	
October 15–18	Budapest Trophy	Other	J	All	Budapest, Hungary	
October 15–18	Diamond Spin	Other	All	M/W/P	Katowice, Poland	
October 16–18	Jelgava Cup	Other	S/J	M/W	Jelgava, Latvia	
October 22–25	Golden Bear of Zagreb	Other	All	M/W/P	Zagreb, Croatia	
October 23–25	Grand Prix de France	Grand Prix	S	All	Angers, France	
October 23–25	Mezzaluna Cup	Other	All	D	Mentana, Italy	
October 27–30	Gordion Cup	Other	All	M/W/D	Ankara, Turkey	
October 27 – November 1	Crystal Skate of Romania	Other	All	M/W	Bucharest, Romania	
October 29 – November 1	Northern Lights Trophy	Other	All	M/W/P	Reykjavík, Iceland	
October 30 – November 1	Skate Canada International	Grand Prix	S	All	Kelowna, British Columbia, Canada	
October 30 – November 1	Tirnavia Ice Cup	Other	All	M/W	Trnava, Slovakia	
November 3–8	Denkova-Staviski Cup	Other	All	M/W/D	Sofia, Bulgaria	
November 3–8	Ice Challenge	Other	All	All	Graz, Austria	
November 4–8	59th Volvo Open Cup	Other	S/J	M/W	Riga, Latvia	
November 6–8	Cup of China	Grand Prix	S	All	Shenzhen, China	
November 6–8	Pavel Roman Memorial	Other	All	D	Olomouc, Czech Republic	
November 6–11	Iceskatera Open 2026	Other	All	M/W/D	Bydgoszcz, Poland	
November 12–15	NRW Trophy	Other	All	M/W/D	Dortmund, Germany	
November 12–15	Lõunakeskus Trophy	Other	All	M/W	Tartu, Estonia	
November 12–15	Merano Ice Trophy Memorial Martina Barricelli	Other	All	M/W	Merano, Italy	
November 13–15	Skate America	Grand Prix	S	All	Everett, Washington, United States	
November 16–22	Tallinn Trophy	Challenger Series	S	All	Tallinn, Estonia	
November 16–22	Tallinn Trophy	Other	J	All	Tallinn, Estonia	
November 18–22	Cup of Innsbruck	Other	All	M/W/P	Innsbruck, Austria	
November 19–22	Skate Celje	Other	All	M/W	Celje, Slovenia	
November 20–21	Finlandia Trophy	Grand Prix	S	All	Helsinki, Finland	
November 23–29	Mexico Cup	Other	All	M/W	Querétaro, Mexico	
November 24–27	Bosphorus Cup	Other	All	M/W/D	Istanbul, Turkey	
November 25–29	Warsaw Cup	Challenger Series	S	All	Warsaw, Poland	
November 27–29	NHK Trophy	Grand Prix	S	All	Tokyo, Japan	
November 30 – December 6	Santa Claus Cup	Other	All	M/W/D	Budapest, Hungary	
December 2–5	Golden Spin of Zagreb	Challenger Series	S	M/W/D	Zagreb, Croatia	
December 2–5	Golden Spin of Zagreb	Other	S	P	Zagreb, Croatia	
December 7–13	EduSport Trophy	Other	All	M/W/D	Bucharest, Romania	
December 10–12	Grand Prix Final	Grand Prix	S/J	All	Chongqing, China	

2027
Dates	Event	Type	Level	Disc.	Location	Ref.
January 11–13	Robin Cousins Cup	Other	S/J	M/W	Nottingham, England, United Kingdom	
January 12–17	Sofia Trophy	Other	All	M/W/D	Sofia, Bulgaria	
January 12–17	Olympic Hopes - In Memoriam Nicolae Bellu	Other	All	M/W	Bucharest, Romania	
January 13–17	Nordic Championships	Other	All	M/W	Tampere, Finland	
January 14–17	60th Volvo Open Cup	Other	S/J	M/W	Riga, Latvia	
January 15–25	Winter World University Games	Other	S	All	Changchun, China	
January 18–24	EDGE Cup	Other	All	M/W/D	Katowice, Poland	
January 19–24	Bavarian Open	Other	All	All	Oberstdorf, Germany	
January 23–24	Sarajevo Open	Other	All	All	Sarajevo, Bosnia and Herzegovina	
January 27–31	European Championships	Championship	S	All	Lausanne, Switzerland	
January 27–31	Dragon Trophy	Other	All	M/W	Ljubljana, Slovenia	
January 28–31	Silver Skate Winter Cup	Other	S/J	M/W	Kaunas, Lithuania	
February 3–7	CUS Torino Cup	Other	All	D	Turin, Italy	
February 3–7	Skate Helena	Other	All	M/W	Belgrade, Serbia	
February 9–13	Skate Berlin	Other	All	All	Berlin, Germany	
February 9–14	Four Continents Championships	Championship	S	All	Astana, Kazakhstan	
February 10–13	CS Ice Challenge	Challenger Series	S	All	Graz, Austria	
February 11–14	Daugava Open Cup	Other	All	M/W	Riga, Latvia	
February 13–14	Finnish Ice Dance Open	Other	All	D	Helsinki, Finland	
February 14–21	European Youth Olympic Festival	Other	J	M/W	Brașov, Romania	
February 18–21	Challenge Cup	Other	All	All	Tilburg, Netherlands	
February 18–21	Southeast Asian Open Trophy	Other	All	M/W	Manila, Philippines	
February 18–21	Tallink Hotels Cup	Other	S/J	M/W	Tallinn, Estonia	
February 24–28	World Junior Championships	Championship	J	All	Sofia, Bulgaria	
March 2–7	Maria Olszewska Memorial	Other	All	M/W/D	Łódź, Poland	
March 4–7	Sisak Open	Other	All	M/W	Sisak, Croatia	
March 4–7	Sonja Henie Trophy	Other	All	M/W	Oslo, Norway	
March 4–7	Crystal Skate Spring	Other	All	M/W	Tallinn, Estonia	
March 10–14	Baltic Cup	Other	J/N	M/W/D	Gdańsk, Poland	
March 11–14	Denver International	Other	All	M/W/P	Denver, Colorado, United States	
March 12–14	Coupe du Printemps	Other	All	M/W	Kockelscheuer, Luxembourg	
March 17–21	World Championships	Championship	S	All	Tampere, Finland	
March 18–21	European Wulfenia Cup	Other	S/J	M/W	Pontebba, Italy	
March 31 – April 4	Black Sea Ice Cup	Other	S/J	M/W	Kranevo, Bulgaria	
April 1–4	#nextgen Icestars	Other	All	M/W	Graz, Austria	
April 7–11	Triglav Trophy	Other	All	M/W	Jesenice, Slovenia	
April 8–11	World Team Trophy	Championship	S	All	Tokyo, Japan	
April 17–18	Sisak Trophy	Other	All	M/W	Sisak, Croatia	
April 21–25	Southeast Asian Nations Trophy	Other	All	M/W	Jakarta, Indonesia	
May 1–4	Thailand Open Trophy	Other	All	M/W	Bangkok, Thailand	
May 10–13	Tallinn Trophy Kids	Other	N	M/W	Tallinn, Estonia	
May 19–22	Oceania International	Other	All	M/W	TBA	

== International medalists ==
=== Men's singles ===
Championships
Competition	Gold	Silver	Bronze	Ref.
(Switzerland) European Championships				
(Kazakhstan) Four Continents Championships				
(Bulgaria) World Junior Championships				
(Finland) World Championships				

Grand Prix
Competition	Gold	Silver	Bronze	Ref.
Grand Prix de France	(France); Adam Siao Him Fa	(Japan); Kao Miura	(South Korea); Seo Min-kyu	
Skate Canada International	(France); Kevin Aymoz	(Japan); Rio Nakata	(Estonia); Mihhail Selevko	
Cup of China	(Japan); Kao Miura	(Individual Neutral Athletes); Vladislav Dikidzhi	(Individual Neutral Athletes); Evgeni Semenenko	
(United States) Skate America	(United States); Ilia Malinin	(Italy); Daniel Grassl	(Israel); Tamir Kuperman	
(Finland) Finlandia Trophy	(Estonia); Mihhail Selevko	(Sweden); Andreas Nordebäck	(Japan); Kazuki Tomono	
(Japan) NHK Trophy				
(China) Grand Prix Final				

Junior Grand Prix
Competition	Gold	Silver	Bronze	Ref.
JGP China	(Individual Neutral Athletes); Lev Lazarev	(New Zealand); Yanhao Li	(Japan); Daiya Ebihara	
JGP Latvia	(South Korea); Choi Ha-bin	(South Korea); Lee Jae-keun	(Switzerland); Ean Weiler	
JGP Thailand	(Individual Neutral Athletes); Lev Lazarev	(New Zealand); Yanhao Li	(Thailand); Hiro Kaewtathip	
JGP Turkey	(Japan); Daiya Ebihara	(Ukraine); Yehor Kurtsev	(South Korea); Choi Ha-bin	
(Georgia (country)) JGP Georgia	(Switzerland); Ean Weiler	(Japan); Hayato Okazaki	(Japan); Sena Takahashi	
JGP Slovenia	(Thailand); Hiro Kaewtathip	(South Korea); Lee Jae-keun	(Japan); Taiga Nishino	
JGP Poland	(Belgium); Denis Krouglov	(Latvia); Janis Znotins	(Ukraine); Yehor Kurtsev	
(China) Junior Grand Prix Final				

Challenger Series
Competition	Gold	Silver	Bronze	Ref.
(United States) Cranberry Cup International	(Estonia); Aleksandr Selevko	(United States); Daniel Martynov	(Israel); Mark Gorodnitsky	
(Japan) Kinoshita Group Cup	(Individual Neutral Athletes); Vladislav Dikidzhi	(Japan); Shun Sato	(Individual Neutral Athletes); Evgeni Semenenko	
(Italy) Lombardia Trophy	(Estonia); Mihhail Selevko	(Individual Neutral Athletes); Matvei Vetlugin	(France); Corentin Spinar	
(Germany) Nebelhorn Trophy	(Estonia); Aleksandr Selevko	(Germany); Genrikh Gartung	(France); François Pitot	
(Slovakia) Nepela Memorial	(Individual Neutral Athletes); Evgeni Semenenko	(Italy); Daniel Grassl	(Kazakhstan); Mikhail Shaidorov	
(Georgia (country)) Trialeti Trophy	(Georgia (country)); Nika Egadze	(Individual Neutral Athletes); Nikolai Ugozhaev	(Estonia); Mihhail Selevko	
(Kazakhstan) Denis Ten Memorial Challenge	(Individual Neutral Athletes); Vladislav Dikidzhi	(Individual Neutral Athletes); Gleb Lutfullin	(Individual Neutral Athletes); Petr Gumennik	
(Hungary) Budapest Trophy	(Italy); Daniel Grassl	(United States); Patrick Blackwell	(Switzerland); Lukas Britschgi	
(Estonia) Tallinn Trophy	(Italy); Gabriele Frangipani	(Canada); Anthony Paradis	(South Korea); Kim Hyun-gyeom	
(Poland) Warsaw Cup				
(Croatia) Golden Spin of Zagreb				
(Austria) CS Ice Challenge				

Other international competitions
Competition	Gold	Silver	Bronze	Ref.
(Indonesia) Asian Open Trophy	(Japan); Kazuki Tomono	(China); Lu Boren	(Chinese Taipei); Li Yu-hsiang	
(Estonia) Tallinn Open	(Estonia); Mihhail Selevko	(Ukraine); Kyrylo Marsak	(Estonia); Arlet Levandi	
(Australia) Swan Trophy	(New Zealand); Yanhao Li	(United States); Kai Kovar	(Chinese Taipei); Huang Yu-chun	
(United Kingdom) Tayside Trophy	(Mexico); Donovan Carrillo	(Israel); Mark Gorodnitsky	(Switzerland); Ean Weiler	
(Poland) Diamond Spin	(Poland); Kornel Witkowski	(Poland); Jakub Lofek	(France); Ian Vauclin	
(Latvia) Jelgava Cup	(Switzerland); Noah Bodenstein	(Norway); Daniil Valanov	(Spain); Adrian Jimenez de Baldomero	
(Croatia) Golden Bear of Zagreb	(Croatia); Maxim Varakin	(Poland); Vladimir Samoilov	(France); Corentin Spinar	
Crystal Skate of Romania	(Israel); Tamir Kuperman	(Bulgaria); Filip Kaymakchiev	—N/a	
(Iceland) Northern Lights Trophy	(France); Xavier Vauclin	(Finland); Valtter Virtanen	(Switzerland); Nico Steffen	
(Slovakia) Tirnavia Ice Cup	(Italy); Gabriele Frangipani	(Italy); Matteo Nalbone	(Ukraine); Vadym Novikov	
(Bulgaria) Denkova-Staviski Cup	(Individual Neutral Athletes); Daniil Samsonov	(France); Corentin Spinar	(Individual Neutral Athletes); Alex Labovich	
(Austria) Ice Challenge	(Austria); Tobia Oellerer	(United Kingdom); Arin Yorke	(Poland); Anton Skoficz	
(Latvia) 59th Volvo Open Cup	(Estonia); Arlet Levandi	(Sweden); Andreas Nordebäck	(Latvia); Fedirs Kuļišs	
(Poland) Iceskatera Open	(Poland); Matvii Yefymenko	—N/a	—N/a	
(Germany) NRW Trophy	(Slovakia); Lukáš Václavík	(France); Samy Hammi	(Germany); Nikita Starostin	
(Italy) Merano Ice Trophy Memorial Martina Barricelli				
(Austria) Cup of Innsbruck				
(Slovenia) Skate Celje				
Mexico Cup				
(Turkey) Bosphorus Cup				
(Hungary) Santa Claus Cup				
(Romania) EduSport Trophy				
(United Kingdom) Robin Cousins Cup				
(Bulgaria) Sofia Trophy				
(Romania) Olympic Hopes - In Memoriam Nicolae Bellu				
(Finland) Nordics Open				
(Latvia) 60th Volvo Open Cup				
(China) Winter World University Games				
(Poland) EDGE Cup				
(Germany) Bavarian Open				
(Bosnia and Herzegovina) Sarajevo Open				
(Slovenia) Dragon Trophy				
(Lithuania) Silver Skate Winter Cup				
(Serbia) Skate Helena				
(Germany) Skate Berlin				
(Latvia) Daugava Open Cup				
(Philippines) Southeast Asian Trophy				
(Netherlands) Challenge Cup				
(Estonia) Tallink Hotels Cup				
(Poland) Maria Olszewska Memorial				
(Croatia) Sisak Open				
(Norway) Sonja Henie Trophy				
(Estonia) Crystal Skate Spring				
(United States) Denver International				
(Luxembourg) Coupe du Printemps				
(Italy) European Wulfenia Cup				
(Austria) #nextgen Icestars				
(Bulgaria) Black Sea Ice Cup				
(Slovenia) Triglav Trophy				
(Croatia) Sisak Trophy				
(Indonesia) Southeast Asian Nations Trophy				
Thailand Open Trophy				
(Australia) Oceania International				

=== Women’s singles ===
Championships
Competition	Gold	Silver	Bronze	Ref.
(Switzerland) European Championships				
(Kazakhstan) Four Continents Championships				
(Bulgaria) World Junior Championships				
(Finland) World Championships				

Grand Prix
Competition	Gold	Silver	Bronze	Ref.
Grand Prix de France	(Japan) Ami Nakai	(Georgia (country)) Anastasiia Gubanova	(Italy) Lara Naki Gutmann	
Skate Canada International	(Japan) Mao Shimada	(Estonia) Niina Petrõkina	(United States) Isabeau Levito	
Cup of China	(Japan) Mone Chiba	(Individual Neutral Athletes) Alexandra Ignatova	(South Korea) Lee Hae-in	
(United States) Skate America	(Japan) Ami Nakai	(Individual Neutral Athletes) Alexandra Ignatova	(Japan) Rino Matsuike	
(Finland) Finlandia Trophy	(Japan) Mao Shimada	(Estonia) Niina Petrõkina	(United States) Isabeau Levito	
(Japan) NHK Trophy				
(China) Grand Prix Final				

Junior Grand Prix
Competition	Gold	Silver	Bronze	Ref.
JGP China	(Individual Neutral Athletes) Sofia Dzepka	(China) Liu Yuxuan	(China) Shuxian Jin	
JGP Latvia	(Australia) Hana Bath	(Japan) Mei Okada	(China) Wang Yihan	
JGP Thailand	(Individual Neutral Athletes) Sofia Dzepka	(Japan) Sumika Kanazawa	(Canada) Lia Cho	
JGP Turkey	(Japan) Mei Okada	(China) Shuxian Jin	(France) Stefania Gladki	
(Georgia (country)) JGP Georgia	(China) Wang Yihan	(Israel) Sophia Shifrin	(France) Stefania Gladki	
JGP Slovenia	(Australia) Hana Bath	(China) Liu Yuxuan	(Switzerland) Leandra Tzimpoukakis	
JGP Poland	(Japan) Sumika Kanazawa	(Canada) Lia Cho	(Switzerland) Elisabeth Dibbern	
(China) Junior Grand Prix Final				

Challenger Series
Competition	Gold	Silver	Bronze	Ref.
(United States) Cranberry Cup International	(South Korea); Kim Yu-seong	(South Korea); Kim Yu-jae	(United States); Logan Higase-Chen	
(Japan) Kinoshita Group Cup	(Japan) Mao Shimada	(Individual Neutral Athletes) Alexandra Ignatova	(Individual Neutral Athletes) Anna Frolova	
(Italy) Lombardia Trophy	(Estonia) Niina Petrõkina	(South Korea) Shin Ji-a	(Italy) Lara Naki Gutmann	
(Germany) Nebelhorn Trophy	(Norway) Mia Risa Gomez	(Italy) Marina Piredda	(Canada) Fee Ann Landry	
(Slovakia) Nepela Memorial	(South Korea); Kim Yu-seong	(South Korea); Lee Hae-in	(Slovakia); Olivia Lengyelová	
(Georgia (country)) Trialeti Trophy	(Estonia) Niina Petrõkina	(Individual Neutral Athletes) Adeliia Petrosian	(Individual Neutral Athletes) Anna Frolova	
(Kazakhstan) Denis Ten Memorial Challenge	(Individual Neutral Athletes) Alexandra Ignatova	(South Korea) Kim Yu-jae	(Kazakhstan) Sofia Samodelkina	
(Hungary) Budapest Trophy	(Individual Neutral Athletes) Alina Gorbacheva	(Romania) Julia Sauter	(Switzerland) Kimmy Repond	
(Estonia) Tallinn Trophy	(Italy) Lara Naki Gutmann	(Estonia) Maria Eliise Kaljuvere	(Canada) Breken Brezden	
(Poland) Warsaw Cup				
(Croatia) Golden Spin of Zagreb				
(Austria) CS Ice Challenge				

Other international competitions
Competition	Gold	Silver	Bronze	Ref.
(Indonesia) Asian Open Trophy	(Japan); Rinka Watanabe	(Chinese Taipei); Tsai Yu-feng	(Australia); Sienna Kaczmarczyk	
(Estonia) Tallinn Open	(Estonia); Niina Petrõkina	(Italy); Sarina Joos	(Estonia); Marta Helena Prangel	
(Australia) Swan Trophy	(Australia); Sienna Kaczmarczyk	(Hong Kong); Chloe Desiree Leung	(Australia); Hope Rowe	
(United Kingdom) Tayside Trophy	(Austria); Olga Mikutina	(Poland); Ekaterina Kurakova	(Canada); Marie-Maude Pomerleau	
(Poland) Diamond Spin	(South Africa); Gian-Quen Isaacs	(Switzerland); Sayra Bessire	(Poland); Karoline Bialas	
(Latvia) Jelgava Cup	(Switzerland); Eugenia Sekulovski	(Latvia); Anastasija Konga	(Norway); Kaia Kleven	
(Croatia) Golden Bear of Zagreb	(Spain); Ariadna Gupta Espada	(Czech Republic); Katerina Hanusova	(Czech Republic); Barbora Tykalova	
Crystal Skate of Romania	(Poland); Ekaterina Kurakova	(Romania); Julia Sauter	(United Kingdom); Lilian Musgrave	
(Iceland) Northern Lights Trophy	(Switzerland); Livia Kaiser	(Sweden); Olivia Elin Phillips	(Norway); Kaia Kleven	
(Slovakia) Tirnavia Ice Cup	(Austria); Hannah Frank	(Czech Republic); Michaela Vrašťáková	(Ukraine); Yelizaveta Babenko	
(Bulgaria) Denkova-Staviski Cup	(Individual Neutral Athletes); Viktoriia Safonova	(South Africa); Gian-Quen Isaacs	(Bulgaria); Alexandra Feigin	
(Austria) Ice Challenge	(Slovakia); Olívia Lengyelová	(Italy); Sarina Joos	(Norway); Mia Risa Gomez	
(Latvia) 59th Volvo Open Cup	(France); Ève Dubecq	(Estonia); Nataly Langerbaur	(Israel); Elizabet Gervits	
(Poland) Iceskatera Open	(Poland); Ekaterina Kurakova	(Lithuania); Evelina Stavickyte	(Czech Republic); Katerina Hanusova	
(Germany) NRW Trophy	(Italy); Anna Pezzetta	(Switzerland); Eugenia Sekulovski	(United States); Alex Evans	
(Estonia) Lõunakeskus Trophy	(Estonia); Maria Eliise Kaljuvere	(Estonia); Marta Helena Prangel	(Finland); Selma Valitalo	
(Italy) Merano Ice Trophy Memorial Martina Barricelli				
(Austria) Cup of Innsbruck				
(Slovenia) Skate Celje				
Mexico Cup				
(Turkey) Bosphorus Cup				
(Hungary) Santa Claus Cup				
(Romania) EduSport Trophy				
(United Kingdom) Robin Cousins Cup				
(Bulgaria) Sofia Trophy				
(Romania) Olympic Hopes - In Memoriam Nicolae Bellu				
(Finland) Nordics Open				
(Latvia) 60th Volvo Open Cup				
(China) Winter World University Games				
(Poland) EDGE Cup				
(Germany) Bavarian Open				
(Bosnia and Herzegovina) Sarajevo Open				
(Slovenia) Dragon Trophy				
(Lithuania) Silver Skate Winter Cup				
(Serbia) Skate Helena				
(Germany) Skate Berlin				
(Latvia) Daugava Open Cup				
(Philippines) Southeast Asian Trophy				
(Netherlands) Challenge Cup				
(Estonia) Tallink Hotels Cup				
(Poland) Maria Olszewska Memorial				
(Croatia) Sisak Open				
(Norway) Sonja Henie Trophy				
(Estonia) Crystal Skate Spring				
(United States) Denver International				
(Luxembourg) Coupe du Printemps				
(Italy) European Wulfenia Cup				
(Austria) #nextgen Icestars				
(Bulgaria) Black Sea Ice Cup				
(Slovenia) Triglav Trophy				
(Croatia) Sisak Trophy				
(Indonesia) Southeast Asian Nations Trophy				
Thailand Open Trophy				
(Australia) Oceania International				

=== Pairs ===
Championships
Competition	Gold	Silver	Bronze	Ref.
(Switzerland) European Championships				
(Kazakhstan) Four Continents Championships				
(Bulgaria) World Junior Championships				
(Finland) World Championships				

Grand Prix
Competition	Gold	Silver	Bronze	Ref.
Grand Prix de France	(Georgia (country)); Anastasiia Metelkina; Luka Berulava	(Individual Neutral Athletes); Aleksandra Boikova; Dmitrii Kozlovskii	(Germany); Annika Hocke; Robert Kunkel	
Skate Canada International	(Canada); Lia Pereira; Trennt Michaud	(United States); Alisa Efimova; Misha Mitrofanov	(Switzerland); Oxana Vouillamoz; Tom Bouvart	
Cup of China	(Individual Neutral Athletes); Anastasia Mishina; Aleksandr Galliamov	(Georgia (country)); Anastasiia Metelkina; Luka Berulava	(Japan); Yuna Nagaoka; Sumitada Moriguchi	
(United States) Skate America	(Germany); Minerva Fabienne Hase; Nikita Volodin	(United States); Alisa Efimova; Misha Mitrofanov	(United States); Katie McBeath; Balazs Nagy	
(Finland) Finlandia Trophy	(Germany); Annika Hocke; Robert Kunkel	(Canada); Lia Pereira; Trennt Michaud	(United States); Audrey Shin; Spencer Akira Howe	
(Japan) NHK Trophy				
(China) Grand Prix Final				

Junior Grand Prix
Competition	Gold	Silver	Bronze	Ref.
JGP China	(Individual Neutral Athletes); Polina Shesheleva; Egor Karnaukhov	(China); Chen Yuxuan; Dong Yinbo	(China); Wang Chen Ling; Chen Yong Zheng	
JGP Latvia	(China); Chen Yuxuan; Dong Yinbo	(United States); Reagan Moss; Jakub Galbavy	(Czech Republic); Debora Anna Cohen; Lukas Vochozka	
JGP Turkey	(Individual Neutral Athletes); Taisiia Guseva; Daniil Ovchinnikov	(Individual Neutral Athletes); Polina Shesheleva; Egor Karnaukhov	(Spain); Anita Mapelli; Noah Quesada Grau	
JGP Poland	(Spain); Anita Mapelli; Noah Quesada Grau	(Georgia (country)); Zlata Kamalova; Danil Panov	(China); Guo Rui; Zhang Yiwen	
(China) Junior Grand Prix Final				

Challenger Series
Competition	Gold	Silver	Bronze	Ref.
(Japan) Kinoshita Group Cup	(Individual Neutral Athletes); Aleksandra Boikova; Dmitrii Kozlovskii	(Individual Neutral Athletes); Ekaterina Chikmareva; Matvei Ianchenkov	(Individual Neutral Athletes); Anastasia Mukhortova; Dimitry Evgenyev	
(United States) John Nicks International Pairs Competition	(Individual Neutral Athletes); Aleksandra Boikova; Dmitrii Kozlovskii	(United States); Audrey Shin; Spencer Akira Howe	(United States); Katie McBeath; Balázs Nagy	
(Germany) Nebelhorn Trophy	(Canada); Lia Pereira; Trennt Michaud	(United States); Audrey Shin; Spencer Akira Howe	(China); Zhang Jiaxuan; Huang Yihang	
(Georgia (country)) Trialeti Trophy	(Georgia (country)); Anastasiia Metelkina; Luka Berulava	(Individual Neutral Athletes); Anastasia Mishina; Aleksandr Galliamov	(Individual Neutral Athletes); Ekaterina Chikmareva; Matvei Ianchenkov	
(Estonia) Tallinn Trophy	(United States); Linzy Fitzpatrick; Keyton Bearinger	(Canada); Miyu Yunoki; Tristan Taylor	(United States); Reagan Moss; Jakub Galbavy	
(Poland) Warsaw Cup				
(Austria) CS Ice Challenge				

Other international competitions
Competition	Gold	Silver	Bronze	Ref.
(Slovakia) Nepela Memorial	(United States); Olivia Flores; Mark Sadusky	(United Kingdom); Zarah Wood; Flavien Giniaux	—N/a	
(United Kingdom) Tayside Trophy	(Canada); Ava Kemp; Yohnatan Elizarov	(France); Camille Kovalev; Pavel Kovalev	(Czech Republic); Anna Valesi; Martin Bidař	
(Austria) Ice Challenge	(United Kingdom); Zarah Wood; Flavien Giniaux	(Czech Republic); Debora Anna Cohen; Lukas Vochozka	(Italy); Sofia Tridello; Alberto Tommasi	
(Austria) Cup of Innsbruck				
(Croatia) Golden Spin of Zagreb				
(Germany) Bavarian Open				
(Germany) Skate Berlin				
(Netherlands) Challenge Cup				
(United States) Denver International				

=== Ice dance ===
Championships
Competition	Gold	Silver	Bronze	Ref.
(Switzerland) European Championships				
(Kazakhstan) Four Continents Championships				
(Bulgaria) World Junior Championships				
(Finland) World Championships				

Grand Prix
Competition	Gold	Silver	Bronze	Ref.
Grand Prix de France	(France); Laurence Fournier Beaudry; Guillaume Cizeron	(Georgia (country)); Diana Davis; Gleb Smolkin	(United States); Christina Carreira; Anthony Ponomarenko	
Skate Canada International	(United Kingdom); Lilah Fear; Lewis Gibson	(France); Evgeniia Lopareva; Geoffrey Brissaud	(United States); Caroline Green; Michael Parsons	
Cup of China	(United Kingdom); Lilah Fear; Lewis Gibson	(Georgia (country)); Diana Davis; Gleb Smolkin	(Spain); Olivia Smart; Tim Dieck	
(United States) Skate America	(United States); Emilea Zingas; Vadym Kolesnik	(France); Evgeniia Lopareva; Geoffrey Brissaud	(Czech Republic); Kateřina Mrázková; Daniel Mrázek	
(Finland) Finlandia Trophy	(France); Laurence Fournier Beaudry; Guillaume Cizeron	(Finland); Juulia Turkkila; Matthias Versluis	(United States); Oona Brown; Gage Brown	
(Japan) NHK Trophy				
(China) Grand Prix Final				

Junior Grand Prix
Competition	Gold	Silver	Bronze	Ref.
JGP China	(Individual Neutral Athletes); Mariia Fefelova; Artem Valov	(Italy); Zoe Bianchi; Daniel Basile	(Canada); Summer Homick; Nicholas Buelow	
JGP Latvia	(France); Dania Mouaden; Theo Bigot	(United States); Aneta Vaclavikova; William Lissauer	(Germany); Eniko Kobor; Zoard Kobor	
JGP Thailand	(Individual Neutral Athletes); Mariia Fefelova; Artem Valov	(Italy); Zoe Bianchi; Daniel Basile	(France); Lea Hienne; Louis Varescon	
JGP Turkey	(United States); Hana Maria Aboian; Daniil Veselukhin	(France); Dania Mouaden; Theo Bigot	(United States); Xinyu Chen; Gordei Chitipakhovian	
(Georgia (country)) JGP Georgia	(France); Ambre Perrier Gianesini; Samuel Blanc Klaperman	(Germany); Darya Grimm; Grigorii Rodin	(United States); Xinyu Chen; Gordei Chitipakhovian	
JGP Slovenia	(Germany); Darya Grimm; Grigorii Rodin	(France); Ambre Perrier Gianesini; Samuel Blanc Klaperman	(United States); Aneta Vaclavikova; William Lissauer	
JGP Poland	(Italy); Arianna Soldati; Nicholas Tagliabue	(United States); Hana Maria Aboian; Daniil Veselukhin	(Italy); Melissa Cachova; Ivan Morozov	
(China) Junior Grand Prix Final				

Challenger Series
Competition	Gold	Silver	Bronze	Ref.
(Japan) Kinoshita Group Cup	(Georgia (country)); Diana Davis; Gleb Smolkin	(Individual Neutral Athletes); Vasilisa Kaganovskaia; Maxim Nekrasov	(Czech Republic); Natalie Taschlerova; Filip Taschler	
(Italy) Lombardia Trophy	(Czech Republic); Katerina Mrazkova; Daniel Mrazek	(France); Evgeniia Lopareva; Geoffrey Brissaud	(United States); Emily Bratti; Ian Somerville	
(Germany) Nebelhorn Trophy	(United States); Christina Carreira; Anthony Ponomarenko	(Canada); Marie-Jade Lauriault; Romain le Gac	(Australia); Holly Harris; Jason Chan	
(Slovakia) Nepela Memorial	(Spain); Olivia Smart; Tim Dieck	(Finland); Juulia Turkkila; Matthias Versluis	(United States); Oona Brown; Gage Brown	
(Georgia (country)) Trialeti Trophy	(Georgia (country)); Diana Davis; Gleb Smolkin	(Individual Neutral Athletes); Elizaveta Pasechnik; Dario Cirisano	(Hungary); Mariia Ignateva; Danijil Leonyidovics Szemko	
(Kazakhstan) Denis Ten Memorial Challenge	(Finland); Juulia Turkkila; Matthias Versluis	(Individual Neutral Athletes); Vasilisa Kaganovskaia; Maxim Nekrasov	(United States); Caroline Green; Michael Parsons	
(Hungary) Budapest Trophy	(Czech Republic); Natálie Taschlerová; Filip Taschler	(Spain); Olivia Smart; Tim Dieck	(Finland); Yuka Orihara; Juho Pirinen	
(Estonia) Tallinn Trophy	(Australia); Holly Harris; Jason Chan	(Canada); Alicia Fabbri; Marko Jevgeni Gaidajenko	(United States); Amy Cui; Jonathan Rogers	
(Poland) Warsaw Cup				
(Croatia) Golden Spin of Zagreb				
(Austria) CS Ice Challenge				

Other international competitions
Competition	Gold	Silver	Bronze	Ref.
(United States) Lake Placid Ice Dance International	(United States); Amy Cui; Jonathan Rogers	(United States); Eva Pate; Logan Bye	(United States); Leah Neset; Artem Markelov	
(United Kingdom) Bolero Cup	(United Kingdom); Lilah Fear; Lewis Gibson	(United States); Rafaella Koncius; Alexey Shchepetov	(France); Natacha Lagouge; Arnaud Caffa	
(Italy) Mezzaluna Cup	(Finland); Juulia Turkkila; Matthias Versluis	(Italy); Giulia Isabella Paolino; Andrea Tuba	(Italy); Carolina Portesi Peroni; Pietro Papetti	
(Bulgaria) Denkova-Staviski Cup	(Italy); Giulia Isabella Paolino; Andrea Tuba	(Individual Neutral Athletes); Vasilisa Grigoreva; Evgenii Artiushchenko	(Individual Neutral Athletes); Elizaveta Shichina; Pavel Drozd	
(Latvia) 59th Volvo Open Cup	(Ukraine); Iryna Pidgaina; Artem Koval	(Czech Republic); Diane Sznajder; Jáchym Novák	(Austria); Anita Straub; Andreas Straub	
(Poland) Iceskatera Open	(Italy); Carolina Portesi Peroni; Pietro Papetti	(Israel); Shira Ichilov; Mikhail Nosovitskiy	(France); Louise Bordet; Martin Chardain	
(Czech Republic) Pavel Roman Memorial	(Czech Republic); Diane Sznajder; Jáchym Novák	—N/a	—N/a	
(Germany) NRW Trophy	(Germany); Charlise Matthaei; Max Liebers	(China); Ren Junfei; Xing Jianing	(Italy); Carolina Portesi Peroni; Pietro Papetti	
(Turkey) Bosphorus Cup				
(Hungary) Santa Claus Cup				
(Romania) EduSport Trophy				
(Bulgaria) Sofia Trophy				
(Poland) EDGE Cup				
(Germany) Bavarian Open				
(Italy) CUS Torino Cup				
(Germany) Skate Berlin				
(Finland) Finnish Ice Dance Open				
(Netherlands) International Challenge Cup				
(Poland) Maria Olszewska Memorial				

== Records and achievements ==
=== Records ===
Prior to the 2026–27 season, the ISU record scores were as follows:

Records prior to the 2026–27 season
Level	Segment	Discipline											
Level	Segment	Men's singles			Women's singles			Pairs			Ice dance		
Level	Segment	Skater	Score	Event	Skater	Score	Event	Team	Score	Event	Team	Score	Event
Senior	SP / RD	(United States); Nathan Chen	113.97	2022 Winter Olympics	(Russia); Kamila Valieva	87.42	2021 Rostelecom Cup	(China); Sui Wenjing; Han Cong	84.41	2022 Winter Olympics	(United States); Madison Chock; Evan Bates	93.91	2023 World Team Trophy
Senior	FS / FD	(United States); Ilia Malinin	238.24	2025–26 Grand Prix Final	(Russia); Kamila Valieva	185.29	2021 Rostelecom Cup	(Japan); Riku Miura; Ryuichi Kihara	158.13	2026 Winter Olympics	(United States); Madison Chock; Evan Bates	138.41	2023 World Team Trophy
Senior	Combined total	(United States); Nathan Chen	335.30	2019–20 Grand Prix Final	(Russia); Kamila Valieva	272.71	2021 Rostelecom Cup	(China); Sui Wenjing; Han Cong	239.88	2022 Winter Olympics	(United States); Madison Chock; Evan Bates	232.32	2023 World Team Trophy
Junior	SP / RD	(Japan); Rio Nakata	89.51	2026 World Junior Championships	(Russia); Alena Kostornaia	76.32	2018–19 Junior Grand Prix Final	(Russia); Apollinariia Panfilova; Dmitry Rylov	73.71	2020 World Junior Championships	(United States); Leah Neset; Artem Markelov	72.48	2023–24 Junior Grand Prix Final
Junior	FS / FD	(United States); Ilia Malinin	187.12	2022 World Junior Championships	(Russia); Sofia Akateva	157.19	2021 JGP Russia	(Georgia (country)); Anastasiia Metelkina; Luka Berulava	131.63	2023–24 Junior Grand Prix Final	(United States); Avonley Nguyen; Vadym Kolesnik	108.91	2020 World Junior Championships
Junior	Combined total	(United States); Ilia Malinin	276.11	2022 World Junior Championships	(Russia); Sofia Akateva	233.08	2021 JGP Russia	(Georgia (country)); Anastasiia Metelkina; Luka Berulava	202.11	2023–24 Junior Grand Prix Final	(Italy); Noemi Maria Tali; Noah Lafornara	177.50	2025 World Junior Championships

== Season's best scores ==
=== Men's singles ===
As of November 14, 2026.

Top 10 season's best scores in the men's combined total
No.	Skater	Nation	Score	Event
1	Vladislav Dikidzhi	AIN	312.79	2026 CS Denis Ten Memorial
2	Kao Miura	Japan	293.25	2026 Cup of China
3	Evgeni Semenenko	AIN	292.09	2026 CS Nepela Memorial
4	Ilia Malinin	United States	284.31	2026 Skate America
5	Adam Siao Him Fa	France	284.24	2026 Grand Prix de France
6	Daniel Grassl	Italy	278.80	2026 CS Nepela Memorial
7	Gleb Lutfullin	AIN	277.23	2026 CS Denis Ten Memorial
8	Shun Sato	Japan	277.20	2026 Cup of China
9	Mikhail Shaidorov	Kazakhstan	272.75	2026 CS Nepela Memorial
10	Nika Egadze	Georgia	262.65	2026 CS Trialeti Trophy

Top 10 season's best scores in the men's short program
No.	Skater	Nation	Score	Event
1	Vladislav Dikidzhi	AIN	107.31	2026 CS Denis Ten Memorial
2	Kao Miura	Japan	102.90	2026 Cup of China
3	Adam Siao Him Fa	France	102.46	2026 Grand Prix de France
4	Shun Sato	Japan	101.97	2026 Cup of China
5	Evgeni Semenenko	AIN	101.16	2026 CS Nepela Memorial
6	Daniel Grassl	Italy	99.10	2026 CS Nepela Memorial
7	Ilia Malinin	United States	96.74	2026 Skate America
8	Rio Nakata	Japan	96.48	2026 CS Kinoshita Group Cup
9	Mikhail Shaidorov	Kazakhstan	95.98	2026 CS Nepela Memorial
10	Gleb Lutfullin	AIN	95.79	2026 CS Denis Ten Memorial

Top 10 season's best scores in the men's free skating
No.	Skater	Nation	Score	Event
1	Vladislav Dikidzhi	AIN	205.48	2026 CS Denis Ten Memorial
2	Evgeni Semenenko	AIN	190.93	2026 CS Nepela Memorial
3	Kao Miura	Japan	190.35	2026 Cup of China
4	Daniel Grassl	Italy	188.25	2026 Skate America
5	Ilia Malinin	United States	187.57	2026 Skate America
6	Adam Siao Him Fa	France	181.78	2026 Grand Prix de France
7	Gleb Lutfullin	AIN	181.44	2026 CS Denis Ten Memorial
8	Petr Gumennik	AIN	181.13	2026 CS Denis Ten Memorial
9	Seo Min-kyu	South Korea	180.88	2026 CS Kinoshita Group Cup
10	Mikhail Shaidorov	Kazakhstan	176.77	2026 CS Nepela Memorial

=== Women's singles ===
As of November 21, 2026.

Top 10 season's best scores in the women's combined total
No.	Skater	Nation	Score	Event
1	Ami Nakai	Japan	236.81	2026 Skate America
2	Mao Shimada	Japan	235.44	2026 Skate Canada International
3	Alexandra Ignatova	AIN	226.01	2026 CS Denis Ten Memorial
4	Mone Chiba	Japan	224.48	2026 Cup of China
5	Niina Petrõkina	Estonia	221.07	2026 Skate Canada International
6	Sofiia Dzepka	AIN	213.28	2026 JGP China
7	Isabeau Levito	United States	212.22	2026 Skate Canada International
8	Rino Matsuike	Japan	211.63	2026 Skate America
9	Lee Hae-in	South Korea	210.79	2026 Cup of China
10	Saki Miyake	Japan	210.09	2026 Skate Canada International

Top 10 season's best scores in the women's short program
No.	Skater	Nation	Score	Event
1	Ami Nakai	Japan	82.20	2026 Skate America
2	Mao Shimada	Japan	82.11	2026 Skate Canada International
3	Isabeau Levito	United States	78.50	2026 Skate Canada International
4	Alexandra Ignatova	AIN	77.39	2026 CS Denis Ten Memorial
5	Niina Petrõkina	Estonia	77.24	2026 Skate Canada International
6	Yuna Aoki	Japan	76.31	2026 Grand Prix de France
7	Kamilla Neliubova	AIN	76.08	2026 CS Kinoshita Group Cup
7	Mone Chiba	Japan	76.08	2026 Cup of China
9	Kim Yu-jae	South Korea	75.99	2026 CS Denis Ten Memorial
10	Anastasiia Gubanova	Georgia	75.05	2026 Cup of China

Top 10 season's best scores in the women's free skating
No.	Skater	Nation	Score	Event
1	Ami Nakai	Japan	154.61	2026 Skate America
2	Mao Shimada	Japan	153.33	2026 Skate Canada International
3	Alexandra Ignatova	AIN	148.90	2026 Cup of China
4	Mone Chiba	Japan	148.40	2026 Cup of China
5	Niina Petrõkina	Estonia	144.98	2026 Finlandia Trophy
6	Lee Hae-in	South Korea	143.30	2026 Cup of China
7	Kim Yu-seong	South Korea	141.43	2026 CS Nepela Memorial
8	Rino Matsuike	Japan	141.33	2026 Skate America
9	Sofiia Dzepka	AIN	140.54	2026 JGP China
10	Isabeau Levito	United States	140.17	2026 Finlandia Trophy

=== Pairs ===
As of November 21, 2026.

Top 10 season's best scores in the pairs' combined total
No.	Skater	Nation	Score	Event
1	Anastasiia Metelkina; Luka Berulava	Georgia	215.83	2026 CS Trialeti Trophy
2	Anastasia Mishina; Aleksandr Galliamov	AIN	209.84	2026 Cup of China
3	Aleksandra Boikova; Dmitrii Kozlovskii	AIN	203.66	2026 CS Kinoshita Group Cup
4	Ekaterina Chikmareva; Matvei Ianchenkov	AIN	202.55	2026 CS Kinoshita Group Cup
5	Lia Pereira; Trennt Michaud	Canada	202.17	2026 Skate Canada International
6	Minerva Fabienne Hase; Nikita Volodin	Germany	200.79	2026 Skate America
7	Taisiia Guseva; Daniil Ovchinnikov	AIN	196.91	2026 JGP Turkey
8	Annika Hocke; Robert Kunkel	Germany	196.40	2026 Finlandia Trophy
9	Audrey Shin; Spencer Akira Howe	United States	193.18	2026 Finlandia Trophy
10	Alisa Efimova; Misha Mitrofanov	United States	191.90	2026 Skate Canada International

Top 10 season's best scores in the pairs' short program
No.	Skater	Nation	Score	Event
1	Anastasiia Metelkina; Luka Berulava	Georgia	80.01	2026 CS Trialeti Trophy
2	Lia Pereira; Trennt Michaud	Canada	77.06	2026 Skate Canada International
3	Aleksandra Boikova; Dmitrii Kozlovskii	AIN	75.85	2026 Grand Prix de France
4	Anastasia Mishina; Aleksandr Galliamov	AIN	74.69	2026 Cup of China
5	Ekaterina Chikmareva; Matvei Ianchenkov	AIN	74.00	2026 CS Trialeti Trophy
6	Minerva Fabienne Hase; Nikita Volodin	Germany	72.71	2026 Skate America
7	Annika Hocke; Robert Kunkel	Germany	72.63	2026 Finlandia Trophy
8	Alisa Efimova; Misha Mitrofanov	United States	71.85	2026 Skate America
9	Anastasia Mukhortova; Dmitry Evgenyev	AIN	70.81	2026 CS Kinoshita Group Cup
9	Katie McBeath; Balázs Nagy	United States	70.81	2026 Finlandia Trophy

Top 10 season's best scores in the pairs' free skating
No.	Skater	Nation	Score	Event
1	Anastasiia Metelkina; Luka Berulava	Georgia	135.82	2026 CS Trialeti Trophy
2	Anastasia Mishina; Aleksandr Galliamov	AIN	135.15	2026 Cup of China
3	Aleksandra Boikova; Dmitrii Kozlovskii	AIN	131.41	2026 CS Kinoshita Group Cup
4	Ekaterina Chikmareva; Matvei Ianchenkov	AIN	130.25	2026 CS Kinoshita Group Cup
5	Minerva Fabienne Hase; Nikita Volodin	Germany	128.08	2026 Skate America
6	Polina Shesheleva; Egor Karnaukhov	AIN	127.53	2026 JGP Turkey
7	Taisiia Guseva; Daniil Ovchinnikov	AIN	126.43	2026 JGP Turkey
8	Audrey Shin; Spencer Akira Howe	United States	125.92	2026 Finlandia Trophy
9	Lia Pereira; Trennt Michaud	Canada	125.11	2026 Skate Canada International
10	Annika Hocke; Robert Kunkel	Germany	123.77	2026 Finlandia Trophy

=== Ice dance ===
As of November 21, 2026.

Top 10 season's best scores in the ice dance combined total
No.	Team	Nation	Score	Event
1	Laurence Fournier Beaudry; Guillaume Cizeron	France	212.91	2026 Finlandia Trophy
2	Diana Davis; Gleb Smolkin	Georgia	208.67	2026 CS Trialeti Trophy
3	Emilea Zingas; Vadym Kolesnik	United States	201.88	2026 Skate America
4	Lilah Fear; Lewis Gibson	Great Britain	201.17	2026 Skate Canada International
5	Olivia Smart; Tim Dieck	Spain	197.22	2026 CS Nepela Memorial
6	Evgenia Lopareva; Geoffrey Brissaud	France	195.28	2026 Skate America
7	Juulia Turkkila; Matthias Versluis	Finland	194.10	2026 CS Nepela Memorial
8	Kateřina Mrázková; Daniel Mrázek	Czech Republic	190.88	2026 Skate America
9	Oona Brown; Gage Brown	United States	190.81	2026 CS Nepela Memorial
10	Christina Carreira; Anthony Ponomarenko	United States	189.36	2026 Grand Prix de France

Top 10 season's best scores in the rhythm dance
No.	Team	Nation	Score	Event
1	Laurence Fournier Beaudry; Guillaume Cizeron	France	85.78	2026 Finlandia Trophy
2	Diana Davis; Gleb Smolkin	Georgia	85.23	2026 CS Trialeti Trophy
3	Emilea Zingas; Vadym Kolesnik	United States	82.52	2026 Skate America
4	Lilah Fear; Lewis Gibson	Great Britain	81.37	2026 Skate Canada International
5	Evgenia Lopareva; Geoffrey Brissaud	France	79.94	2026 Skate America
6	Olivia Smart; Tim Dieck	Spain	79.42	2026 CS Budapest Trophy
7	Christina Carreira; Anthony Ponomarenko	United States	78.98	2026 CS Nebelhorn Trophy
8	Caroline Green; Michael Parsons	United States	78.64	2026 CS Denis Ten Memorial
9	Juulia Turkkila; Matthias Versluis	Finland	77.58	2026 Finlandia Trophy
10	Natálie Taschlerová; Filip Taschler	Czech Republic	76.65	2026 Finlandia Trophy

Top 10 season's best scores in the free dance
No.	Team	Nation	Score	Event
1	Laurence Fournier Beaudry; Guillaume Cizeron	France	127.13	2026 Finlandia Trophy
2	Diana Davis; Gleb Smolkin	Georgia	123.44	2026 CS Trialeti Trophy
3	Lilah Fear; Lewis Gibson	Great Britain	119.80	2026 Skate Canada International
4	Emilea Zingas; Vadym Kolesnik	United States	119.36	2026 Skate America
5	Olivia Smart; Tim Dieck	Spain	118.05	2026 CS Nepela Memorial
6	Juulia Turkkila; Matthias Versluis	Finland	117.65	2026 CS Nepela Memorial
7	Evgenia Lopareva; Geoffrey Brissaud	France	115.34	2026 Skate America
8	Kateřina Mrázková; Daniel Mrázek	Czech Republic	114.56	2026 Skate America
9	Oona Brown; Gage Brown	United States	114.22	2026 CS Nepela Memorial
10	Vasilisa Kaganovskaia; Maxim Nekrasov	AIN	112.92	2026 CS Denis Ten Memorial

== World standings ==
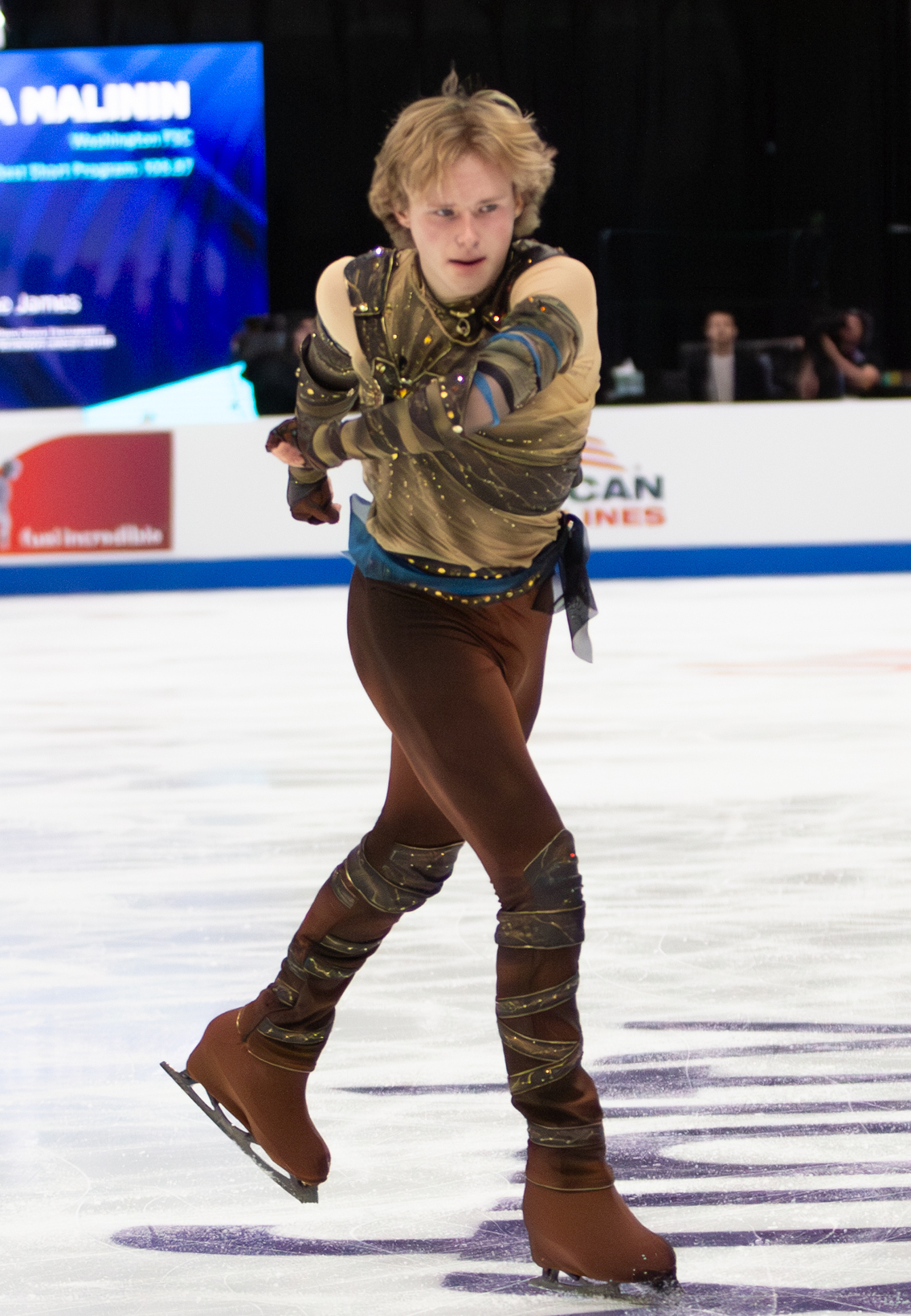
Ilia Malinin of the United States was the highest ranked men's singles skater at the beginning of the 2026–27 season.

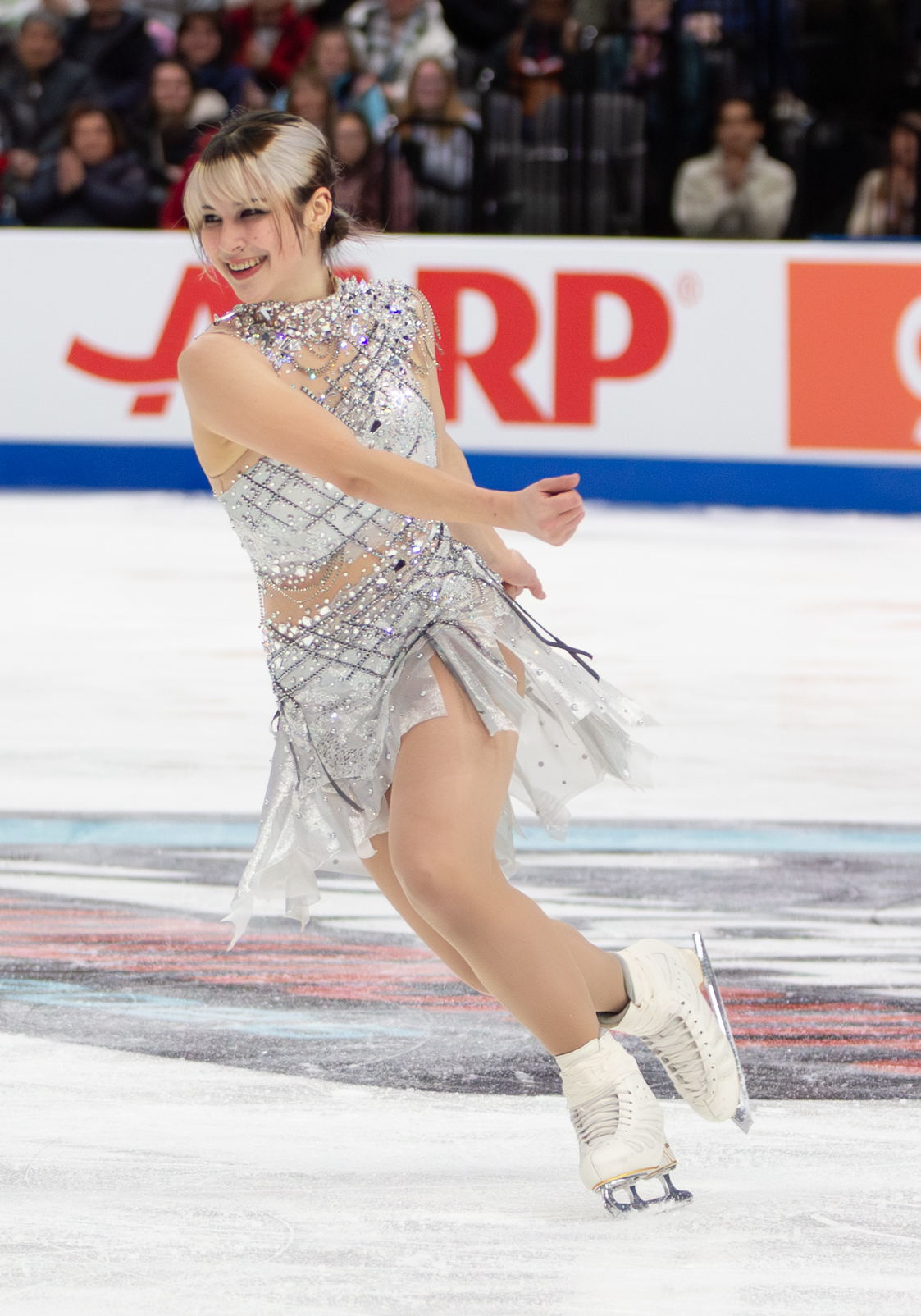
Alysa Liu of the United States was the highest ranked women's singles skater at the beginning of the 2026–27 season.

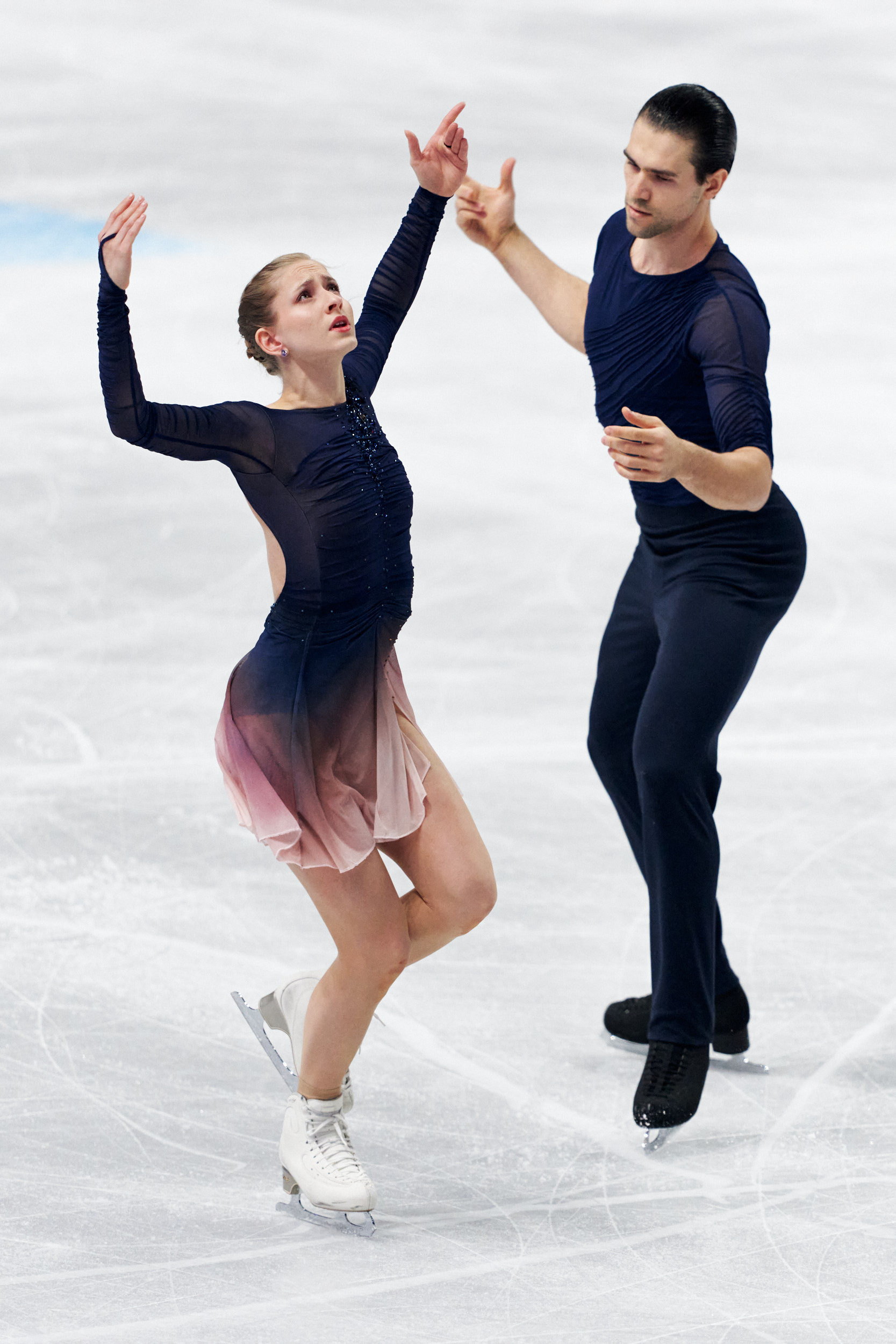
Minerva Fabienne Hase and Nikita Volodin of Germany were the highest ranked pair skaters at the beginning of the 2026–27 season.

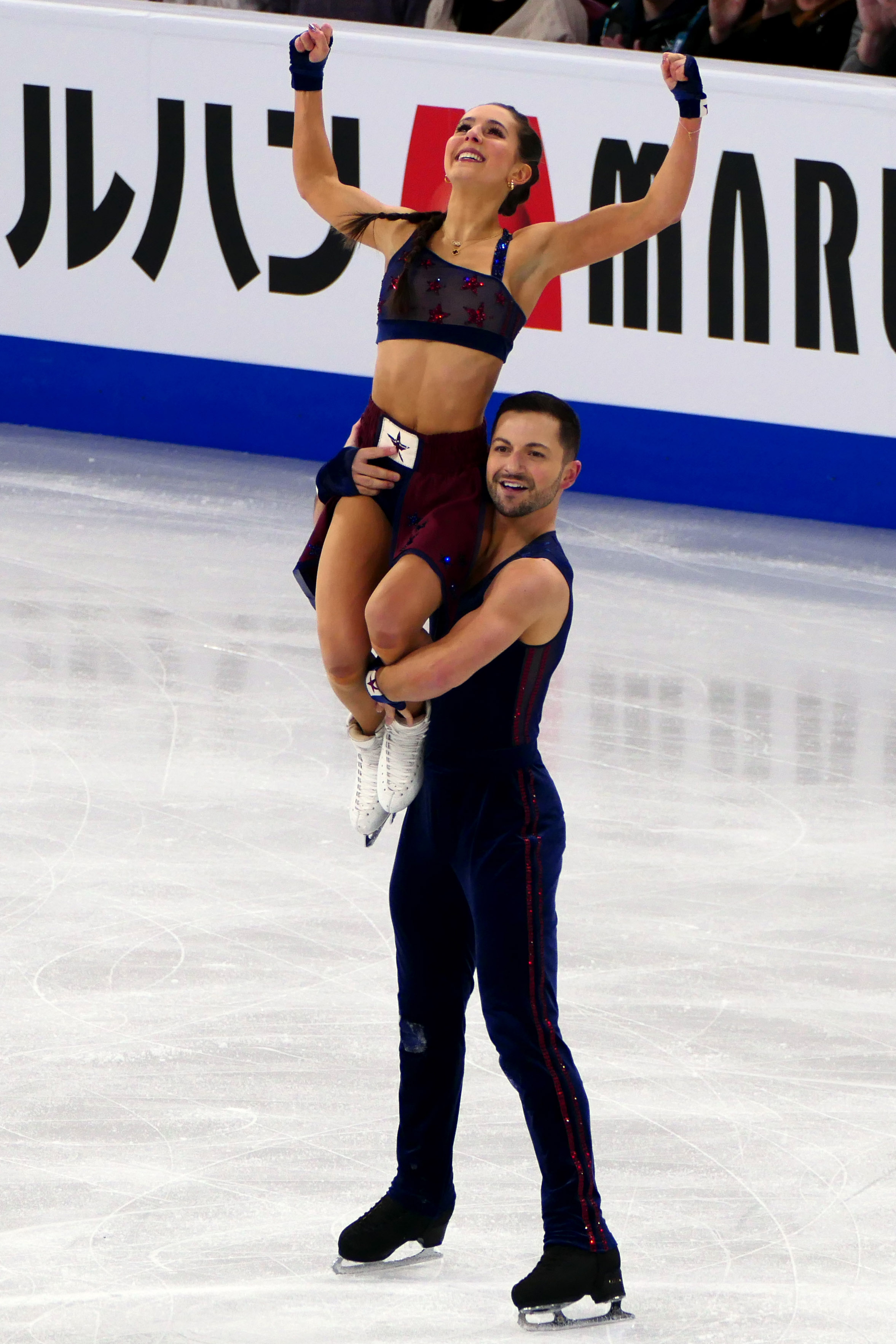
Lilah Fear and Lewis Gibson of Great Britain were the highest ranked ice dancers at the beginning of the 2026–27 season.

=== Men's singles ===
As of November 15, 2026.

No.	Skater	Nation
1	Ilia Malinin	United States
2	Mikhail Shaidorov	Kazakhstan
3	Yuma Kagiyama	Japan
4	Shun Sato	Japan
5	Adam Siao Him Fa	France
6	Daniel Grassl	Italy
7	Kévin Aymoz	France
8	Nika Egadze	Georgia
9	Kao Miura	Japan
10	Aleksandr Selevko	Estonia

=== Women's singles ===
As of November 21, 2026.

No.	Skater	Nation
1	Mone Chiba	Japan
2	Alysa Liu	United States
3	Ami Nakai	Japan
4	Isabeau Levito	United States
5	Amber Glenn	United States
6	Niina Petrõkina	Estonia
7	Anastasiia Gubanova	Georgia
8	Lara Naki Gutmann	Italy
9	Bradie Tennell	United States
10	Sofia Samodelkina	Kazakhstan

=== Pairs ===
As of November 15, 2026.

No.	Team	Nation
1	Minerva Fabienne Hase; Nikita Volodin	Germany
2	Anastasiia Metelkina; Luka Berulava	Georgia
3	Alisa Efimova; Misha Mitrofanov	United States
4	Lia Pereira; Trennt Michaud	Canada
5	Deanna Stellato-Dudek; Maxime Deschamps	Canada
6	Ellie Kam; Daniel O'Shea	United States
7	Maria Pavlova; Alexei Sviatchenko	Hungary
8	Oxana Vouillamoz; Tom Bouvart	Switzerland
9	Yuna Nagaoka; Sumitada Moriguchi	Japan
10	Ava Kemp; Yohnatan Elizarov	Canada

=== Ice dance ===
As of November 21, 2026.

No.	Team	Nation
1	Lilah Fear; Lewis Gibson	Great Britain
2	Madison Chock; Evan Bates	United States
3	Evgenia Lopareva; Geoffrey Brissaud	France
4	Olivia Smart; Tim Dieck	Spain
5	Diana Davis; Gleb Smolkin	Georgia
6	Emilea Zingas; Vadym Kolesnik	United States
7	Piper Gilles; Paul Poirier	Canada
8	Charlène Guignard; Marco Fabbri	Italy
9	Caroline Green; Michael Parsons	United States
10	Christina Carreira; Anthony Ponomarenko	United States
