= Gian-Quen Isaacs =

South African figure skater

Personal information
- Born: 12 December 2004 (age 21) Cape Town
- Home town: Cape Town
- Height: 163 cm (5 ft 4 in)

Figure skating career
- Country: South Africa
- Coach: Megan Allely-Painczyk; Ondrej Hotarek
- Skating club: Western Province FSC
- Began skating: 2012

Medal record
South African Championships
Gold medal – first place	2026 Cape Town	Singles
Gold medal – first place	2025 Cape Town	Singles
Gold medal – first place	2024 Cape Town	Singles
Gold medal – first place	2022 Cape Town	Singles

Gian-Quen Isaacs (born December 12, 2004) is a South African figure skater. She is a four time South African champion (2022, 2024–26), the 2026 Diamond Spin champion and the 2026 Denkova-Staviski Cup silver medalist. She is the first female figure skater from South Africa to win an international competition.

== Personal life ==
Gian-Quen Isaacs was born on December 12, 2004, in Cape Town, South Africa to a single mother, Letitia Isaacs.

== Career ==
=== Early career ===
Isaacs began skating at the age of seven after deciding to practice sport. She initially joined an ice hockey group but was later recommended by the coaching team to try figure skating; “To get into ice hockey they (trainers) said I needed the ice time for it, so I joined one of their clubs. That’s where they advised me that I had the potential to do well on ice, but in figure skating.”

Isaacs made her Junior Grand Prix debut during the 2018–19 season in Kaunas, Lithuania where she placed thirty-first overall. The following season, Isaacs competes at the JGP stages in Latvia and Poland, finishing twenty-sixth and twenty-fourth respectively.

During the 2021–22 season, Isaacs contracted 'Long COVID', she had lung problems prior to contracting the virus, which exacerbated her illness. Isaacs was not allowed to get onto the ice for two months which hindered her training. “Being away from skating, I had to think, ‘Okay, I've never gone more than a week without skating. I really had to re-evaluate and think, ‘Okay, is this something I actually see myself doing? Am I doing it because it's all I've done, and is it because I have to, or is it because I want to?” she said. ‘I found myself asking the hard questions and I'm still here.” She competed twice during the season; placing twentieth at the 2022 Egna Spring Trophy, as well as winning her first senior national title at the 2021–22 South African Championships.

In the 2022–23 season, Isaacs placed twenty sixth at the JGP stage in Latvia.

=== 2023–24 season ===
Isaacs opened her final junior season at the Asian Trophy where she placed tenth overall. She later went onto place twenty-fifth at the JGP stage in Hungary. The following month, she placed eleventh at the Budapest Trophy.

Isaacs made her World Junior debut at the 2024 World Junior Figure Skating Championships in Taipei. She placed thirty-eighth in the short program, unable to advance to the free skate segment.

In March, Isaacs won her second senior national title.

=== 2024–25 season ===
In early September, Isaacs made her senior international debut on the ISU Challenger Series at the 2024 Lombardia Trophy. Earning a new personal best short program score, Isaacs concluded the event in thirteenth place overall. She placed seventeenth at the Budapest Trophy and fifth at the Diamond Spin the following month.

She made her championship debut at the 2025 Four Continents Figure Skating Championships in South Korea. Isaacs finished the competition in eighteenth place. “It's just amazing to be here, actually. Like seeing all these skaters that I've only seen like on my phone. I mean, I walked into the change room earlier and Deanna Stellato was there and I was like, whoa! It’s amazing, such an honor to compete here! I'm still waiting for someone to pinch me, it feels unreal!”

She closed out the season by winning her third national senior title.

=== 2025–26 season ===
Isaacs opened the new season at the 2025 Lombardia Trophy, placing fourteenth overall.

Since Isaacs did not achieve the technical minimum requirements to compete at the 2025 World Championships the prior season, she did not garner the opportunity to try to qualify an Olympic quota for South African women for the upcoming 2026 Winter Olympics. Isaacs was hopeful to be the first South African figure skater in twenty five years to be sent to the Olympic Games. "My eyes are set on qualifying for Milano Cortina 2026," the singles skater said. "And yes, I know it’s not an easy path... but to qualify would mean all the sacrifices and challenges faced were worth it." Hence, Isaacs competed at the 2025 Skate to Milano event in September, a second chance to try and qualify a spot. Skaters in the women's singles discipline had to achieve a top five placement to qualify a quota. Isaacs finished in fifteenth place, unable to qualify for the Games.

In November, she placed seventh at the 2025 Cup of Innsbruck.

In January, Isaacs returned to the Four Continents Championships, this time in Beijing. Isaacs achieved a new personal best total score of 137.05 points and concluded the event in seventeenth place. She finished her season in May, by winning her fourth senior national title.

=== 2026–27 season ===
Isaacs opened the new season in October at the 2026 Diamond Spin. At this event, Isaacs won the event, making her the first South African skater to win an international competition. She later went onto win silver at the 2026 Denkova-Staviski Cup. Additionally, Isaacs achieved her technical minimum required score for the upcoming 2027 World Championships.

== Programs ==
Season	Short program	Free skating	Exhibition
2026–2027	Uccen (DWTS Remix) by Taalbi Brothers choreo. by Ondrej Hotarek	Heart of a King; Raoul and Christine; Surrounded (from "The Man in the Iron Mask") by Nick Glennie-Smith choreo. by Ondrej Hotarek	
2025–2026	Higher by Reinaeiry choreo. by Ondrej Hotarek	Heart of a King; Raoul and Christine; Surrounded (from "The Man in the Iron Mask") by Nick Glennie-Smith choreo. by Ondrej Hotarek	
2024–2025	Higher by Reinaeiry choreo. by Ondrej Hotarek	Horizon of Memories; Afterlight; Horizon of Memories by Eternal Eclipse choreo by Ondrej Hotarek	
2023–2024	El Tango de Roxanne by Jose Feliciano, Ewan McGregor	Horizon of Memories; Afterlight; Horizon of Memories by Eternal Eclipse choreo by Ondrej Hotarek	
