= 2027 Four Continents Figure Skating Championships =

International figure skating competition

2027 Four Continents Championships
- Type: ISU Championship
- Date: 9 – 14 February
- Season: 2026–27
- Location: Almaty, Kazakhstan
- Previous: 2026 Four Continents Championships
- Next: 2028 Four Continents Championships

The 2027 Four Continents Figure Skating Championships are scheduled to take place from 9 to 14 February in Almaty, Kazakhstan. Medals were awarded in men's singles, women's singles, pair skating, and ice dance.

== Background ==
From 1923 to 1971, skaters from Canada and the United States competed at the biennial North American Figure Skating Championships. This allowed Canadian and American skaters the opportunity to compete at a comparable event to the European Figure Skating Championships. At this time, medal contenders at the World Figure Skating Championships and the Winter Olympics came from either Europe or North America. However, by the mid-1970s, skaters from Asia were also successfully competing at major international events. The last North American Championships were held in 1971, so skaters from Europe had the advantage of an International Skating Union (ISU) championship event that was not accessible to skaters outside of Europe. In order to provide equal opportunities for all skaters, the ISU established the Four Continents Figure Skating Championships in 1999. The name referred to the four continents outside of Europe where competitive figure skating took place: Africa, Asia, Australia (Oceania), and North America.

Only those competitors who are "members of a non-European ISU Member" are eligible to compete in the Four Continents Championships. Unlike the European Figure Skating Championships, where member nations are only entitled to enter one competitor or team per discipline, but with requirements that must be met in order to submit additional competitors, the Four Continents Championships allow member nations to enter up to three competitors or teams per discipline. The 2027 Four Continents Championships were originally scheduled to be held from 9 to 14 February in Astana, Kazakhstan. In October 2026, the competition was relocated to Almaty.

== Judging ==
For the 2026–27 season, all of the technical elements in any figure skating performance – such as jumps and spins – were assigned a predetermined base point value and were then scored by a panel of seven or nine judges on a scale from -5 to 5 based on their quality of execution. The judging panel's Grade of Execution (GOE) was determined by calculating the trimmed mean (that is, the average after deleting the highest and lowest scores), and this GOE was added to the base value to come up with the final score for each element. The panel's scores for all elements were added together to generate a total elements score. At the same time, judges evaluated each performance based on three program components – skating skills, presentation, and composition – and assigned a score from .25 to 10 in .25 point increments. The judging panel's final score for each program component was also determined by calculating the trimmed mean. Those scores were then multiplied by the factor shown on the following chart; the results were added together to generate a total program component score.

Program component factoring
Discipline	Short program or Rhythm dance	Free skate or Free dance
Men	1.67	3.33
Women	1.33	2.67
Pairs	1.33	2.67
Ice dance	1.33	2.00

Deductions were applied for certain violations like time infractions, stops and restarts, or falls. The total elements score and total program component score were added together, minus any deductions, to generate a final performance score for each skater or team.

== Works cited ==
- "Special Regulations & Technical Rules – Single & Pair Skating and Ice Dance 2024" (PDF). International Skating Union. Archived (PDF) from the original on 3 June 2025.
