= 2027 World Junior Figure Skating Championships =

Figure skating competition

- Type: ISU Championship
- Date: 24 – 28 February
- Season: 2026–27
- Location: Sofia, Bulgaria
- Venue: Arena 8888
- Previous: 2026 World Junior Championships
- Next: 2028 World Junior Championships

The 2027 World Junior Figure Skating Championships are scheduled for 24 to 28 February at the Arena 8888 in Sofia, Bulgaria. The competition determined the entry quotas for each skating federation at the 2028 World Junior Championships. Medals were awarded in men's singles, women's singles, pair skating, and ice dance.

== Qualification ==
Skaters were eligible for the 2027 World Junior Championships if they turned 13 years of age before 1 July 2026, and if they have not yet turned 19 (singles) or 21 (ice dancers and female pairs skaters) or 23 (male pairs skaters).

Based on the results of the 2026 World Junior Championships, each ISU member nation could field between one and three entries per discipline.

Number of entries per discipline
Spots	Men	Women	Pairs	Ice dance
3	Japan; South Korea; United States	Japan	Canada; China; United States	France; Italy; United States
2	Belgium; Germany; New Zealand	Australia; China; Georgia; Israel; South Korea; Switzerland; United States	France; Italy; Ukraine	Austria; Canada; Czech Republic; Germany; Ukraine
