= 2027 European Figure Skating Championships =

European figure skating competition

- Type: ISU Championship
- Date: 27 – 31 January
- Season: 2026–27
- Location: Lausanne, Switzerland
- Venue: Vaudoise Aréna
- Previous: 2026 European Championships
- Next: 2028 European Championships

The 2027 European Figure Skating Championships are scheduled to be held from 27 to 31 January at the Vaudoise Aréna in Lausanne, Switzerland. Medals will be awarded in men's singles, women's singles, pair skating, and ice dance. The competition also determined the entry quotas for each skating federation to the 2028 European Championships.

== Background ==
The European Figure Skating Championships are an annual figure skating competition sanctioned by the International Skating Union (ISU). They are the oldest competition in figure skating. The first European Championships were held in 1891 in Hamburg, Germany. Only eligible skaters from ISU member countries in Europe are allowed to compete, while skaters from countries outside of Europe instead compete at the Four Continents Figure Skating Championships. The 2027 European Championships will be held from 27 to 31 January at the Vaudoise Aréna in Lausanne, Switzerland.

== Qualification ==
The number of entries from each nation for the 2027 European Championships was based on the results of the 2026 European Championships. These nations were eligible to enter more than one skater or team in the indicated disciplines.

Number of entries per discipline
Spots	Men	Women	Pairs	Ice dance
3	Estonia; Georgia; Italy	Belgium; Italy	Georgia; Germany	France
2	Czech Republic; Israel; Latvia; Slovakia; Switzerland; Ukraine	Estonia; Finland; Georgia; Poland; Switzerland	Czech Republic; France; Great Britain; Hungary; Italy; Poland; Switzerland	Czech Republic; Finland; Georgia; Great Britain; Italy; Lithuania; Spain

== Judging ==
All of the technical elements in any figure skating performance – such as jumps and spins – were assigned a predetermined base point value and then scored by a panel of nine judges on a scale from –5 to 5 based on their quality of execution. The judging panel's Grade of Execution (GOE) was determined by calculating the trimmed mean (the average after discarding the highest and lowest scores), and this GOE was added to the base value to come up with the final score for each element. The panel's scores for all elements were added together to generate a total elements score. At the same time, the judges evaluated each performance based on three program components – skating skills, presentation, and composition – and assigned a score from 0.25 to 10 in 0.25 point increments. The judging panel's final score for each program component was also determined by calculating the trimmed mean. Those scores were then multiplied by the factor shown on the following chart; the results were added together to generate a total program component score.

Program component factoring
Discipline	Short program or Rhythm dance	Free skate or Free dance
Men	1.67	3.33
Women	1.33	2.67
Pairs	1.33	2.67
Ice dance	1.33	2.00

Deductions were applied for certain violations like time infractions, stops and restarts, or falls. The total elements score and total program component score were added together, minus any deductions, to generate a final performance score for each skater or team.

== Works cited ==
- "Special Regulations & Technical Rules – Single & Pair Skating and Ice Dance 2024" (PDF). International Skating Union. Archived (PDF) from the original on 3 June 2025.
