= 2026 Four Continents Figure Skating Championships =

International figure skating competition

2026 Four Continents Championships
- Type: ISU Championship
- Date: 21 – 25 January
- Season: 2025–26
- Location: Beijing, China
- Host: Chinese Skating Association
- Venue: National Indoor Stadium

Champions
- Men's singles: (Japan) Kao Miura
- Women's singles: (Japan) Yuna Aoki
- Pairs: (United States) Alisa Efimova and Misha Mitrofanov
- Ice dance: (United States) Emilea Zingas and Vadym Kolesnik
- Previous: 2025 Four Continents Championships
- Next: 2027 Four Continents Championships

The 2026 Four Continents Figure Skating Championships took place from 21 to 25 January at the National Indoor Stadium in Beijing, China. Medals were awarded in men's singles, women's singles, pair skating, and ice dance.

== Background ==
From 1923 to 1971, skaters from Canada and the United States competed at the biennial North American Figure Skating Championships. This allowed Canadian and American skaters the opportunity to compete at a comparable event to the European Figure Skating Championships. At this time, medal contenders at the World Figure Skating Championships and the Winter Olympics came from either Europe or North America. However, by the mid-1970s, skaters from Asia were also successfully competing at major international events. The last North American Championships were held in 1971, so skaters from Europe had the advantage of an International Skating Union (ISU) championship event that was not accessible to skaters outside of Europe. In order to provide equal opportunities for all skaters, the ISU established the Four Continents Figure Skating Championships in 1999. The name referred to the four continents outside of Europe where competitive figure skating took place: Africa, Asia, Australia (Oceania), and North America.

The 2026 Four Continents Championships were held from 21 to 25 January at the National Indoor Stadium in Beijing, China.

== Changes to preliminary assignments ==
Only those competitors who are "members of a non-European ISU Member" are eligible to compete in the Four Continents Championships. Unlike the European Figure Skating Championships, where member nations are only entitled to enter one competitor or team per discipline, but with requirements that must be met in order to submit additional competitors, the Four Continents Championships allow member nations to enter up to three competitors or teams per discipline. The International Skating Union released a complete list of entrants on 29 December 2025.

Date	Discipline	Withdrew	Added	Ref.
12 January	Women	(South Korea) Kim Chae-yeon	(South Korea) Yun Ah-sun	
13 January	Men	(United States) Jason Brown	(United States) Liam Kapeikis	

== Required performance elements ==
=== Single skating ===
Women competing in single skating first performed their short programs on Thursday, 22 January, while men performed theirs on Saturday, 24 January. Lasting no more than 2 minutes 40 seconds, the short program had to include the following elements:

For men: one double or triple Axel; one triple or quadruple jump; one jump combination consisting of a double jump and a triple jump, two triple jumps, or a quadruple jump and a double jump or triple jump; one flying spin; one camel spin or sit spin with a change of foot; one spin combination with a change of foot; and a step sequence using the full ice surface.

For women: one double or triple Axel; one triple jump; one jump combination consisting of a double jump and a triple jump, or two triple jumps; one flying spin; one layback spin, sideways leaning spin, camel spin, or sit spin without a change of foot; one spin combination with a change of foot; and one step sequence using the full ice surface.

Women performed their free skates on Friday, 23 January, while men performed theirs on Sunday, 25 January. The free skate performance for both men and women could last no more than 4 minutes, and had to include the following: seven jump elements, of which one had to be an Axel-type jump; three spins, of which one had to be a spin combination, one had to be a flying spin, and one had to be a spin with only one position; a step sequence; and a choreographic sequence.

=== Pairs ===
Couples competing in pair skating first performed their short programs on Thursday, 22 January. Lasting no more than 2 minutes 40 seconds, the short program has to include the following elements: one pair lift, one double or triple twist lift, one double or triple throw jump, one double or triple solo jump, one solo spin combination with a change of foot, one death spiral, and a step sequence using the full ice surface.

Couples performed their free skates on Saturday, 24 January. The free skate performance can last no more than 4 minutes, and has to include the following: three pair lifts, of which one has to be a twist lift; two different throw jumps; one solo jump; one jump combination or sequence; one pair spin combination; one death spiral; and a choreographic sequence.

=== Ice dance ===
Couples competing in ice dance performed their rhythm dances on Thursday, 22 January. Lasting no more than 2 minutes 50 seconds, the theme of the rhythm dance this season was "music, dance styles, and feeling of the 1990s". Examples of applicable dance styles and music included, but were not limited to: pop, Latin, house, techno, hip-hop, and grunge. The rhythm dance had to include the following elements: one pattern dance step sequence, one choreographic rhythm sequence, one dance lift, one set of sequential twizzles, and one step sequence.

Couples then performed their free dances on Friday, 23 January. The free dance performance could last no longer than 4 minutes, and had to include the following: three dance lifts, one dance spin, one set of synchronized twizzles, one step sequence in hold, one step sequence while on one skate and not touching, and three choreographic elements.

== Judging ==
For the 2025–26 season, all of the technical elements in any figure skating performance – such as jumps and spins – were assigned a predetermined base point value and were then scored by a panel of seven or nine judges on a scale from -5 to 5 based on their quality of execution. The judging panel's Grade of Execution (GOE) was determined by calculating the trimmed mean (that is, the average after deleting the highest and lowest scores), and this GOE was added to the base value to come up with the final score for each element. The panel's scores for all elements were added together to generate a total elements score. At the same time, judges evaluated each performance based on three program components – skating skills, presentation, and composition – and assigned a score from .25 to 10 in .25 point increments. The judging panel's final score for each program component was also determined by calculating the trimmed mean. Those scores were then multiplied by the factor shown on the following chart; the results were added together to generate a total program component score.

Program component factoring
Discipline	Short program or Rhythm dance	Free skate or Free dance
Men	1.67	3.33
Women	1.33	2.67
Pairs	1.33	2.67
Ice dance	1.33	2.00

Deductions were applied for certain violations like time infractions, stops and restarts, or falls. The total elements score and total program component score were added together, minus any deductions, to generate a final performance score for each skater or team.

== Medal summary ==
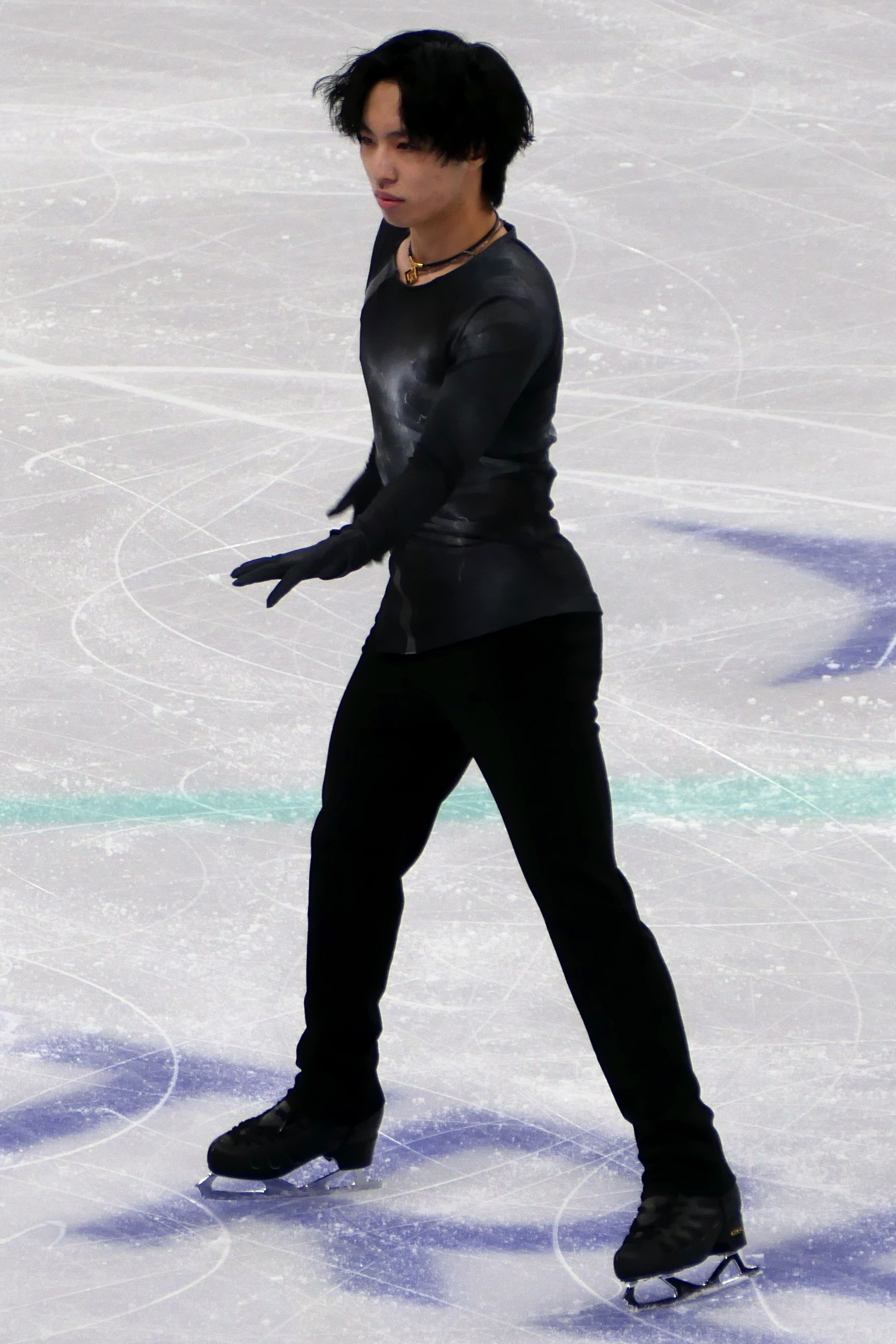
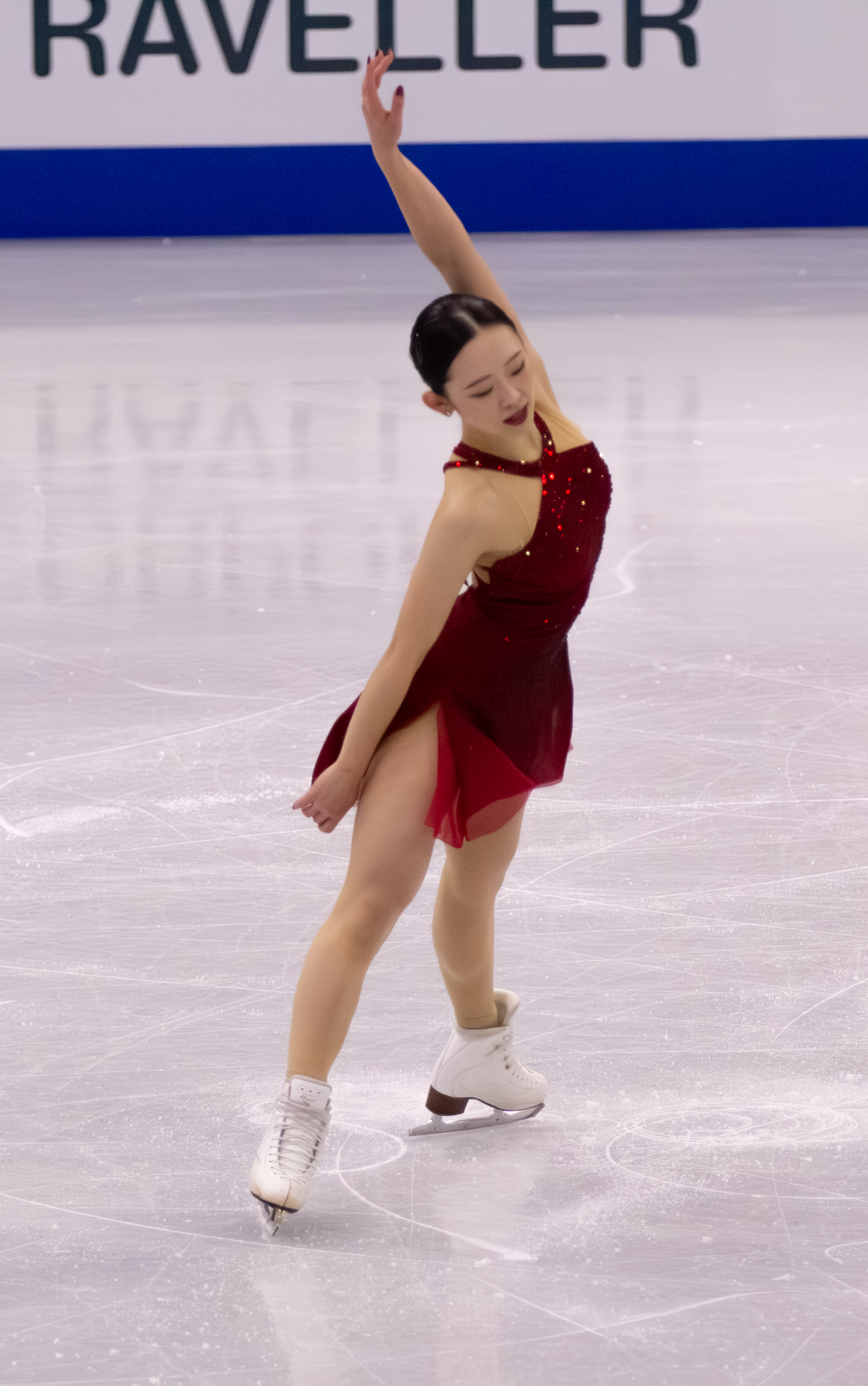
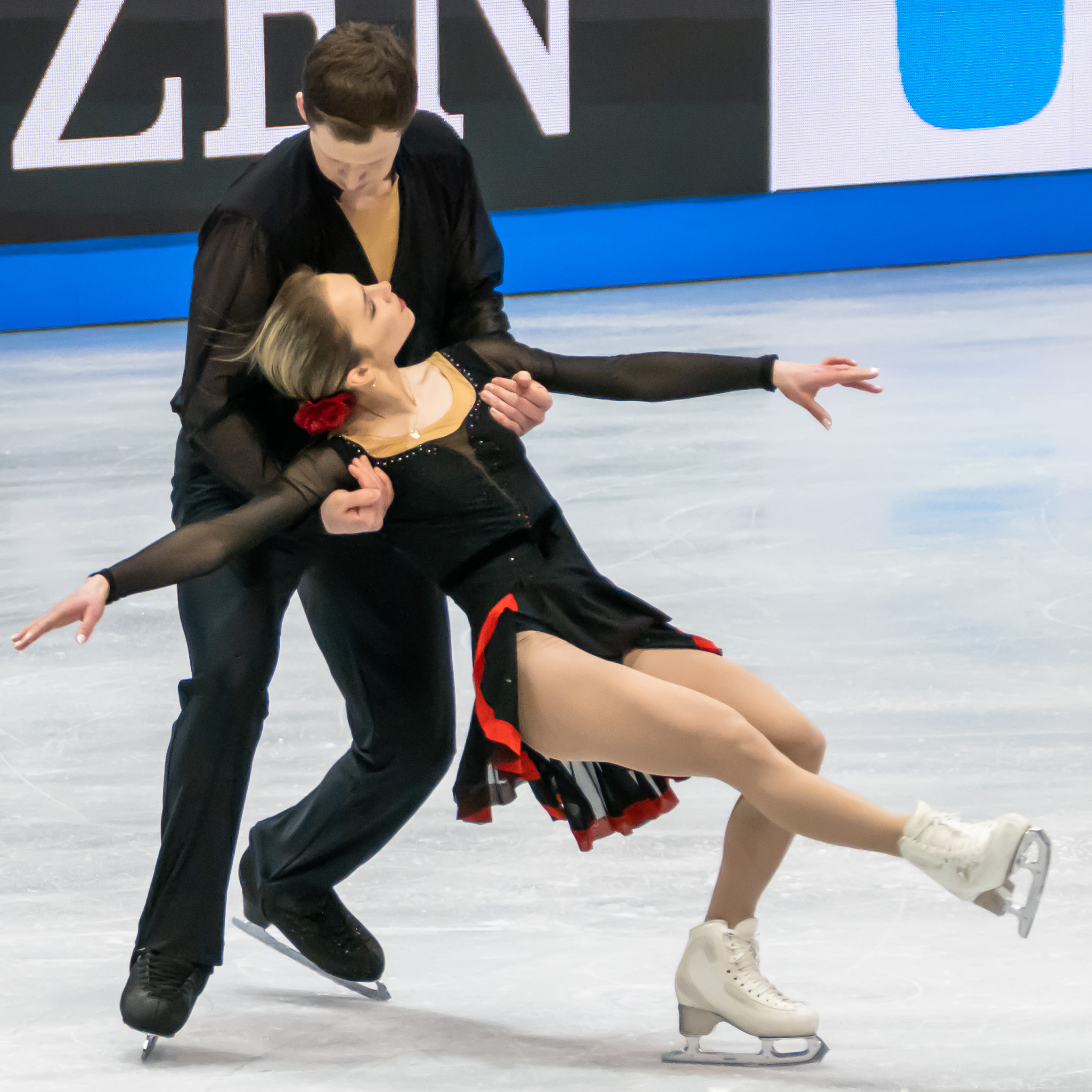
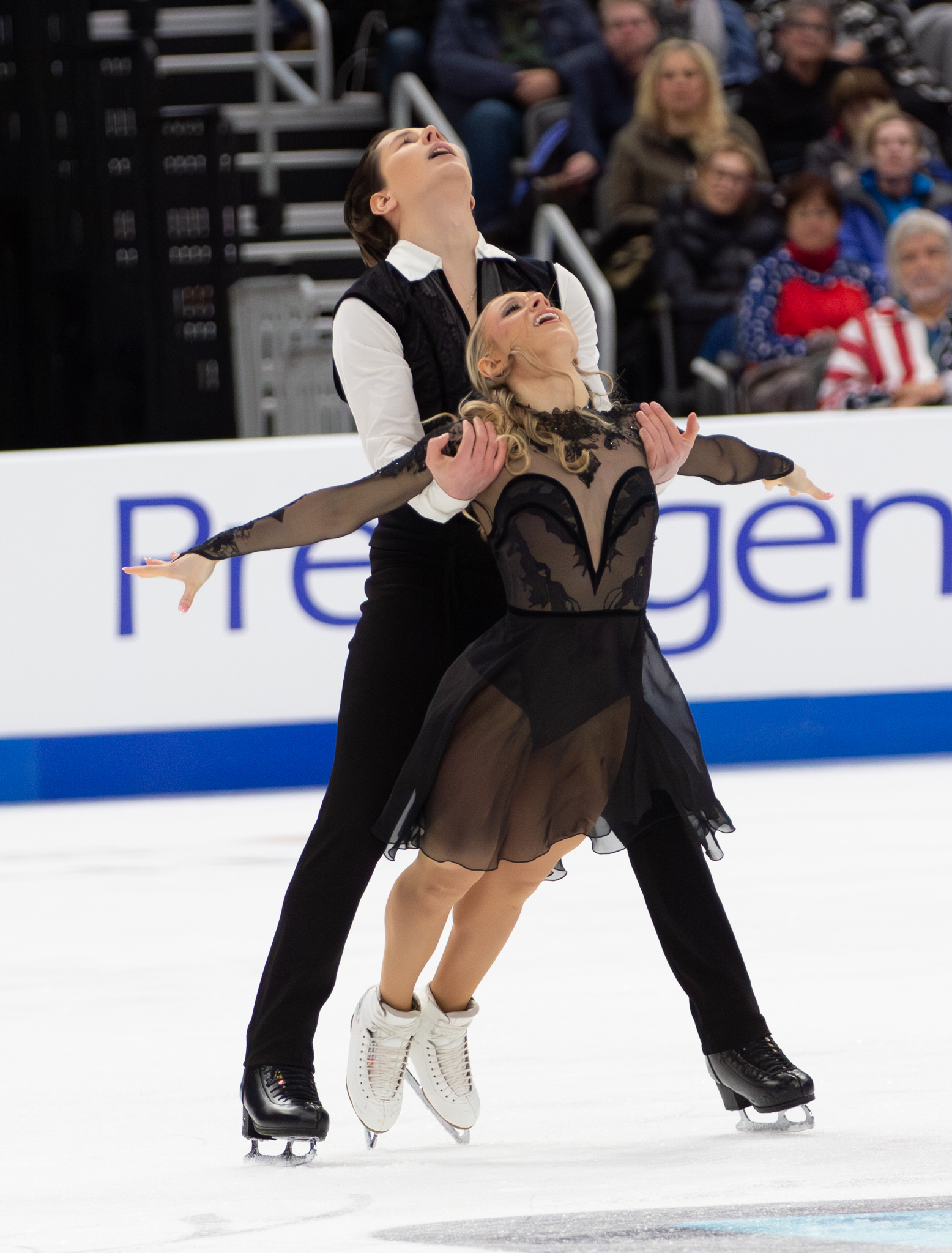
The 2026 Four Continents champions: Kao Miura of Japan (men's singles); Yuna Aoki of Japan (women's singles); Alisa Efimova and Misha Mitrofanov of the United States (pair skating); and Emilea Zingas and Vadym Kolesnik of the United States (ice dance)

=== Medalists ===
Medals awarded to the skaters who achieved the highest overall placements in each discipline:

Discipline	Gold	Silver	Bronze
Men	(Japan); Kao Miura	(South Korea); Cha Jun-hwan	(Japan); Sōta Yamamoto
Women	(Japan); Yuna Aoki	(Japan); Ami Nakai	(Japan); Mone Chiba
Pairs	(United States); Alisa Efimova; Misha Mitrofanov	(China); Sui Wenjing; Han Cong	(Japan); Yuna Nagaoka; Sumitada Moriguchi
Ice dance	(United States); Emilea Zingas; Vadym Kolesnik	(United States); Caroline Green; Michael Parsons	(United States); Oona Brown; Gage Brown

Small medals awarded to the skaters who achieved the highest short program or rhythm dance placements in each discipline:

Discipline	Gold	Silver	Bronze
Men	(Japan); Kao Miura	(Japan); Kazuki Tomono	(Japan); Sōta Yamamoto
Women	(Japan); Ami Nakai	(Japan); Yuna Aoki	(Japan); Mone Chiba
Pairs	(China); Sui Wenjing; Han Cong	(Japan); Yuna Nagaoka; Sumitada Moriguchi	(United States); Alisa Efimova; Misha Mitrofanov
Ice dance	(United States); Emilea Zingas; Vadym Kolesnik	(United States); Caroline Green; Michael Parsons	(United States); Oona Brown; Gage Brown

Small medals awarded to the skaters who achieved the highest free skating or free dance placements in each discipline:

Discipline	Gold	Silver	Bronze
Men	(South Korea); Cha Jun-hwan	(Kazakhstan); Mikhail Shaidorov	(Japan); Sōta Yamamoto
Women	(Japan); Yuna Aoki	(Japan); Ami Nakai	(Japan); Mone Chiba
Pairs	(United States); Alisa Efimova; Misha Mitrofanov	(China); Zhang Jiaxuan; Huang Yihang	(Japan); Yuna Nagaoka; Sumitada Moriguchi
Ice dance	(United States); Emilea Zingas; Vadym Kolesnik	(United States); Oona Brown; Gage Brown	(United States); Caroline Green; Michael Parsons

=== Medals by country ===
Table of medals for overall placement:

Rank	Nation	Gold	Silver	Bronze	Total
1	Japan	2	1	3	6
2	United States	2	1	1	4
3	China	0	1	0	1
3	South Korea	0	1	0	1
Totals (4 entries)		4	4	4	12

== Results ==
=== Men's singles ===
Men's results
Rank	Skater	Nation	Total	SP		FS	
1st place, gold medalist(s)	Kao Miura	Japan	273.73	1	98.59	4	175.14
2nd place, silver medalist(s)	Cha Jun-hwan	South Korea	273.62	6	88.89	1	184.73
3rd place, bronze medalist(s)	Sōta Yamamoto	Japan	270.07	3	94.68	3	175.39
4	Kazuki Tomono	Japan	268.60	2	97.19	5	171.41
5	Mikhail Shaidorov	Kazakhstan	266.20	4	90.55	2	175.65
6	Jin Boyang	China	258.86	5	89.46	6	169.40
7	Tomoki Hiwatashi	United States	240.54	8	80.88	8	159.66
8	Jacob Sanchez	United States	240.25	11	78.57	7	161.68
9	Roman Sadovsky	Canada	233.51	9	79.66	9	153.55
10	Liam Kapeikis	United States	226.75	12	76.72	10	150.03
11	Chen Yudong	China	223.68	10	79.66	13	144.02
12	Wesley Chiu	Canada	220.31	15	73.61	11	146.70
13	Peng Zhiming	China	217.34	13	74.79	14	142.55
14	Aleksa Rakic	Canada	213.18	16	68.83	12	144.35
15	Donovan Carrillo	Mexico	213.05	14	74.00	16	139.05
16	Lee Jae-keun	South Korea	211.22	7	82.25	18	128.97
17	Kim Hyun-gyeom	South Korea	208.92	17	67.50	15	141.42
18	Yu-Hsiang Li	Chinese Taipei	198.27	20	63.33	17	134.94
19	Douglas Gerber	Australia	189.06	18	64.55	19	124.51
20	Dias Jirenbayev	Kazakhstan	185.43	19	63.90	20	121.53
21	Oleg Melnikov	Kazakhstan	164.34	21	58.96	22	105.38
22	Jarvis Ho	Hong Kong	162.23	24	52.46	21	109.77
23	Ze Zeng Fang	Malaysia	149.55	23	54.37	23	95.18
24	Paolo Borromeo	Philippines	136.15	22	54.60	24	81.55
25	Kwang Bom Han	North Korea	52.44	25	52.44	Did not advance to free skate	
26	Chiu Hei Cheung	Hong Kong	46.22	26	46.22	Did not advance to free skate	

=== Women's singles ===
Women's results
Rank	Skater	Nation	Total	SP		FS	
1st place, gold medalist(s)	Yuna Aoki	Japan	217.39	2	71.41	1	145.98
2nd place, silver medalist(s)	Ami Nakai	Japan	215.78	1	73.83	2	141.95
3rd place, bronze medalist(s)	Mone Chiba	Japan	202.23	3	68.07	3	134.16
4	Bradie Tennell	United States	199.37	7	66.16	4	133.21
5	Lee Hae-in	South Korea	192.66	6	67.06	6	125.60
6	Shin Ji-a	South Korea	185.06	14	53.97	5	131.09
7	Gabrielle Daleman	Canada	183.47	4	67.69	10	115.78
8	Sarah Everhardt	United States	182.72	5	67.51	11	115.21
9	Sofia Samodelkina	Kazakhstan	182.51	9	62.29	7	120.22
10	Zhang Ruiyang	China	178.61	11	58.81	8	119.80
11	Fée Ann Landry	Canada	177.18	12	57.92	9	119.26
12	Zhu Yi	China	174.00	10	58.99	12	115.01
13	Sara-Maude Dupuis	Canada	166.95	13	56.59	13	110.36
14	Yun Ah-sun	South Korea	160.74	15	51.71	14	109.03
15	Starr Andrews	United States	160.74	8	65.82	15	94.92
16	An Xiangyi	China	140.66	16	49.77	16	90.89
17	Gian-Quen Isaacs	South Africa	137.05	18	48.48	18	88.57
18	Tara Prasad	India	134.66	20	44.23	17	90.43
19	Tsz Ching Chan	Hong Kong	130.33	17	49.29	19	81.04
20	Andrea Montesinos Cantú	Mexico	127.97	19	48.13	21	79.84
21	Amira Irmatova	Kazakhstan	123.20	21	42.40	20	80.80
22	Petra Lahti	New Zealand	102.48	22	41.83	22	60.65

=== Pairs ===
Pairs results
Rank	Team	Nation	Total	SP		FS	
1st place, gold medalist(s)	Alisa Efimova; Misha Mitrofanov	United States	205.34	3	71.85	1	133.49
2nd place, silver medalist(s)	Sui Wenjing; Han Cong	China	200.99	1	76.02	4	124.97
3rd place, bronze medalist(s)	Yuna Nagaoka; Sumitada Moriguchi	Japan	197.46	2	71.95	3	125.51
4	Zhang Jiaxuan; Huang Yihang	China	196.29	4	69.05	2	127.24
5	Kelly Ann Laurin; Loucas Ethier	Canada	188.27	5	65.68	5	122.59
6	Katie McBeath; Daniil Parkman	United States	181.12	9	57.29	6	121.44
7	Audrey Shin; Balázs Nagy	United States	176.40	6	63.11	7	113.27
8	Ava Kemp; Yohnatan Elizarov	Canada	159.20	10	49.09	8	110.11
9	Ryom Tae-ok; Han Kum-chol	North Korea	158.20	9	55.92	9	102.28
10	Isabella Gamez; Alexander Korovin	Philippines	143.05	11	47.77	10	95.28
11	Anastasia Golubeva; Hektor Giotopoulos Moore	Australia	141.95	8	59.27	11	82.68

=== Ice dance ===
Ice dance results
Rank	Team	Nation	Total	RD		FD	
1st place, gold medalist(s)	Emilea Zingas; Vadym Kolesnik	United States	202.86	1	79.97	1	122.89
2nd place, silver medalist(s)	Caroline Green; Michael Parsons	United States	194.72	2	78.66	3	116.06
3rd place, bronze medalist(s)	Oona Brown; Gage Brown	United States	190.78	3	74.24	2	116.54
4	Alicia Fabbri; Paul Ayer	Canada	183.49	4	73.20	5	110.29
5	Holly Harris; Jason Chan	Australia	177.08	5	68.33	6	108.75
6	Hannah Lim; Ye Quan	South Korea	176.97	7	66.05	4	110.92
7	Utana Yoshida; Masaya Morita	Japan	170.66	6	67.31	7	103.35
8	Lily Hensen; Nathan Lickers	Canada	164.56	9	62.96	8	101.60
9	Wang Shiyue; Liu Xinyu	China	164.34	8	64.41	9	99.93
10	Ren Junfei; Xing Jianing	China	158.67	10	61.55	10	97.12
11	Xiao Zixi; He Linghao	China	154.08	11	61.26	11	92.82
12	Gaukhar Nauryzova; Boyisangur Datiev	Kazakhstan	137.34	12	52.39	14	84.95
13	Jamie Fournier; Everest Zhu	Canada	134.00	15	43.73	12	90.27
14	Natalia Pallu-Neves; Jayin Panesar	Brazil	132.06	13	46.02	13	86.04
15	Harlow Lynella Stanley; Seiji Urano	Mexico	120.42	14	44.96	15	75.46

== Works cited ==
- "Special Regulations & Technical Rules – Single & Pair Skating and Ice Dance 2024" (PDF). International Skating Union. Archived (PDF) from the original on 3 June 2025.
