= 2027 World Figure Skating Championships =

International figure skating competition

- Type: ISU Championship
- Date: 17 – 21 March
- Season: 2026–27
- Location: Tampere, Finland
- Venue: Nokia Arena
- Previous: 2026 World Championships
- Next: 2028 World Championships

The 2027 World Figure Skating Championships are scheduled to be held from 17 to 21 March at the Nokia Arena in Tampere, Finland. Medals will be awarded in men's singles, women's singles, pair skating, and ice dance.

== Background ==
The World Figure Skating Championships are considered the most prestigious event in figure skating. The 2027 World Championships are scheduled to be held from 17 to 21 March at the Nokia Arena in Tampere, Finland.

== Qualification ==
The number of entries from each nation for the 2027 World Championships is based on the results of the 2026 World Championships.

The following nations were eligible to enter more than one skater or team in the indicated disciplines.

Number of entries per discipline
Spots	Men	Women	Pairs	Ice dance
3	France; Japan; United States	Japan; United States	Georgia; Germany	Canada; France; United States
2	Canada; Estonia; Italy; Switzerland	Belgium; Estonia; Georgia; Italy; South Korea	Armenia; Canada; China; Hungary; Japan; Switzerland; United States	Czech Republic; Georgia; Great Britain; Lithuania; Spain

== Judging ==
All of the technical elements in any figure skating performance – such as jumps and spins – are assigned a predetermined base point value and then scored by a panel of nine judges on a scale from −5 to 5 based on their quality of execution. The judging panel's Grade of Execution (GOE) is determined by calculating the trimmed mean (the average after discarding the highest and lowest scores), and this GOE is added to the base value to come up with the final score for each element. The panel's scores for all elements are added together to generate a total elements score. At the same time, judges evaluate each performance based on three program components – skating skills, presentation, and composition – and assign a score from 0.25 to 10 in 0.25 point increments. The judging panel's final score for each program component is also determined by calculating the trimmed mean. Those scores are then multiplied by the factor shown on the following chart; the results are added together to generate a total program component score.

Program component factoring
Discipline	Short program or rhythm dance	Free skate or free dance
Men	1.67	3.33
Women	1.33	2.67
Pairs	1.33	2.67
Ice dance	1.33	2.00

Deductions are applied for certain violations like time infractions, stops and restarts, or falls. The total elements score and total program component score are added together, minus any deductions, to generate a final performance score for each skater or team.

== Works cited ==
- "Special Regulations & Technical Rules – Single & Pair Skating and Ice Dance 2024" (PDF). International Skating Union. Archived (PDF) from the original on 3 June 2025.
