= 2025–26 figure skating season =

Competitive figure skating year, July 1, 2025, to June 30, 2026

- Date: July 1, 2025 – June 30, 2026
- Previous: 2024–25
- Next: 2026–27

The 2025–26 figure skating season began on July 1, 2025, and ended on June 30, 2026. During this season, elite skaters competed at the ISU Championship level at the 2026 European Championships, Four Continents Championships, World Junior Championships, and the World Championships, as well as at the 2026 Winter Olympics. They also competed at elite events such as the ISU Challenger Series, the Grand Prix and Junior Grand Prix series, culminating at the Grand Prix Final.

On December 20, 2024, the International Skating Union (ISU) announced that the Figure Skating Federation of Russia and the Skating Union of Belarus would be permitted to nominate a figure skater or team from each discipline to participate at the ISU Skate to Milano in Beijing, China as a means to qualify for the 2026 Winter Olympics as Individual Neutral Figure Skating Athletes (AINs). These skaters were required to pass a special screening process to assess whether they had displayed any active support for the Russian invasion of Ukraine or any contractual links to Russian or Belarusian military and other national security agencies. It was also announced that all figure skaters and officials from Russia and Belarus would otherwise remain banned from attending all other international competitions. On May 13, 2025, the ISU released the list of skaters that had been granted AIN status. No Russian pair skating and ice dance team nominations were approved by the ISU.

== Season notes ==
=== Age eligibility ===
Skaters are eligible to compete in ISU events at the junior or senior levels according to their age. These rules may not apply to non-ISU events such as national championships.

Level	Date of birth
Junior (singles)	Born between July 1, 2006 & June 30, 2012
Junior (ice dance & females in pairs)	Born between July 1, 2004 & June 30, 2012
Junior (males in pairs)	Born between July 1, 2002 & June 30, 2012
Senior (all disciplines)	Born before July 1, 2008

At the ISU Congress held in Phuket, Thailand, in June 2022, members of the ISU Council accepted a proposal to gradually increase the minimum age limit for senior competition to 17 years old beginning from the 2024–25 season. To avoid forcing skaters who had already competed in the senior category to return to juniors, the age limit remained unchanged during the 2022–23 season, before increasing to 16 years old during the 2023–24 season, and increasing to 17 years old for the 2024–25 season.

== Changes ==
If skaters of different nationalities form a team, the ISU requires that they choose one country to represent. The date provided is the date when the change occurred or, if not available, the date when the change was announced.

=== Partnership changes ===
Date	Skaters	Disc.	Type	Notes	Ref.
July 1, 2025	(Japan); Ayumi Kagotani; Lucas Tsuyoshi Honda	Pairs	Formed		
July 11, 2025	(Japan); Azusa Tanaka; Shingo Nishiyama	Ice dance	Split	Tanaka retired.	
July 11, 2025	(United States); Chelsea Liu; Ryan Bedard	Pairs	Formed		
July 19, 2025	(Germany); Darya Grimm; Grigorii Rodin	Ice dance	Formed	For Germany	
July 22, 2025	(United States); Isabella Flores; Ivan Desyatov	Ice dance	Split		
July 22, 2025	(United States); Isabella Flores; Linus Colmor Jepsen	Ice dance	Formed	For the United States	
July 23, 2025	(Canada); Nadiia Bashynska; Noé Perron	Ice dance	Formed	For Canada	
July 29, 2025	(Canada); Martina Ariano Kent; Charly Laliberté Laurent	Pairs	Split		
July 30, 2025	(United Kingdom); Lydia Smart; Harry Mattick	Pairs	Split		
July 30, 2025	(United Kingdom); Zinia Wood; Harry Mattick	Pairs	Formed		
August 17, 2025	(Georgia (country)); Maria Kazakova; Vladislav Kasinskij	Ice dance	Formed	For Georgia	
September 22, 2025	(Germany); Sara Kishimoto; Michail Savitskiy	Ice dance	Formed	For Germany	
September 24, 2025	(Uzbekistan); Ekaterina Geynish; Dmitrii Chigirev	Pairs	Split	Chibi rev retired	
September 28, 2025	(Japan); Rika Kihira; Shingo Nishiyama	Ice dance	Formed		
October 1, 2025	(United States); Charlene Bailey; Nathan Bartholomay	Pairs	Formed		
October 15, 2025	(Canada); Amanda Urban; Peter Beaumont	Ice dance	Formed		
November 28, 2025	(Uzbekistan); Ekaterina Geynish; Marco Zandron	Pairs	Formed	For Uzbekistan	
December 7, 2025	(Canada); Nina Ouellette; Charly Laliberté Laurent	Pairs	Formed	For Canada	
December 9, 2025	(Sweden); Greta Crafoord; John Crafoord	Pairs	Split	John Crafoord retired.	
December 30, 2025	(Germany); Letizia Roscher; Luis Schuster	Pairs	Split		
January 6, 2026	(Italy); Leia Dozzi; Pietro Papetti	Ice dance	Split		
March 26, 2026	(United States); Audrey Shin; Balázs Nagy	Pairs	Split		
March 31, 2026	(Canada); Alicia Fabbri; Paul Ayer	Ice dance	Split		
April 1, 2026	(Canada); Lily Hensen; Nathan Lickers	Ice dance	Split		
April 5, 2026	(United Kingdom); Anastasia Vaipan-Law; Luke Digby	Pairs	Split	Digby retired. Vaipan-Law retired on July 10, 2026.	
April 13, 2026	(United States); Olivia Flores; Luke Wang	Pairs	Split		
April 19, 2026	(Poland); Ioulia Chtchetinina; Michał Woźniak	Pairs	Split	Chtchetinina retired.	
April 20, 2026	(South Korea); Hannah Lim; Ye Quan	Ice dance	Split		
April 21, 2026	(Canada); Fiona Bombardier; Benjamin Mimar	Pairs	Split		
April 27, 2026	(Canada); Kelly Ann Laurin; Loucas Éthier	Pairs	Split		
May 4, 2026	(Italy); Rebecca Ghilardi; Filippo Ambrosini	Pairs	Split	Ghilardi retired.	
May 7, 2026	(United States); Katie McBeath; Daniil Parkman	Pairs	Split		
May 10, 2026	(Canada); Marjorie Lajoie; Zachary Lagha	Ice dance	Split		
May 11, 2026	(United States); Starr Andrews; Daniil Parkman	Pairs	Formed		
May 12, 2026	(Canada); Fiona Bombardier; Loucas Éthier	Pairs	Formed		
May 18, 2026	(Australia); Anastasiia Golubeva; Hektor Giotopoulos Moore	Pairs	Split	Giotopoulos Moore chose to take a break from competitive skating.	
May 21, 2026	(Japan); Marin Honda; Shoma Uno	Ice dance	Formed		
May 22, 2026	(Italy); Sara Conti; Niccolò Macii	Pairs	Split	Macii retired.	
May 23, 2026	(Italy); Milania Väänänen; Filippo Ambrosini	Pairs	Formed	For Italy	
May 31, 2026	(Iceland); Júlía Sylvía Gunnarsdóttir; Manuel Piazza	Pairs	Split		
June 1, 2026	(Canada); Marjorie Lajoie; Jean-Luc Baker	Ice dance	Formed	For Canada	
June 2, 2026	(United States); Katie McBeath; Balázs Nagy	Pairs	Formed		
June 4, 2026	(Italy); Carolina Portesi Peroni; Pietro Papetti	Ice dance	Formed		
June 10, 2026	(United States); Emily Chan; Spencer Akira Howe	Pairs	Split		
June 13, 2026	(United States); Audrey Shin; Spencer Akira Howe	Pairs	Formed		
June 15, 2026	(United Kingdom); Zarah Wood; Flavien Giniaux	Pairs	Formed	For Great Britain	
June 16, 2026	(Japan); Rikako Fukase; Atsuhiko Tamura	Ice dance	Formed	For Japan	
June 17, 2026	(Canada); Alicia Fabbri; Marko Jevgeni Gaidajenko	Ice dance	Formed	For Canada, announced on July 10, 2026	
June 17, 2026	(Canada); Sandrine Gauthier; Paul Ayer	Ice dance	Formed		
June 19, 2026	(Canada); Hannah Lim; Zachary Lagha	Ice dance	Formed	For Canada	
June 20, 2026	(Cyprus); Angelina Kudryavtseva; Ilia Karankevich	Ice dance	Split		
June 20, 2026	(Canada); Deanna Stellato-Dudek; Maxime Deschamps	Pairs	Split	Deschamps retired on July 7, 2026.	
June 24, 2026	(Lithuania); Paulina Ramanauskaitė; Deividas Kizala	Ice dance	Split	Ramanauskaitė retired.	
June 25, 2026	(France); Lori-Ann Matte; Noël-Antoine Pierre	Pairs	Split		
June 25, 2026	(Canada); Eliana Secunda; Thierry Ferland	Pairs	Split		
June 25, 2026	(Canada); Lori-Ann Matte; Thierry Ferland	Pairs	Formed	For Canada	
June 30, 2026	(United States); Olivia Flores; Mark Sadusky	Pairs	Formed		

=== Retirements ===
Date	Skater(s)	Disc.	Ref.
July 11, 2025	(Japan); Azusa Tanaka	Ice dance	
July 15, 2025	(United States); Yaroslav Paniot	Men	
August 1, 2025	(Czech Republic); Petr Kotlařík	Men	
August 6, 2025	(Israel); Elizabeth Tkachenko; Alexei Kiliakov	Ice dance	
November 18, 2025	(Estonia); Eva-Lotta Kiibus	Women	
November 24, 2025	(Russia); Elizaveta Tuktamysheva	Women	
December 9, 2025	(Sweden); John Crafoord	Pairs	
December 16, 2025	(Germany); Kai Jagoda	Men	
December 20, 2025	(Japan); Yuto Kishina	Men	
December 22, 2025	(Turkey); Burak Demirboğa	Men	
January 8, 2026	(United States); Ava Marie Ziegler	Women	
January 13, 2026	(South Korea); Lee Si-hyeong	Men	
January 18, 2026	(Croatia); Jari Kessler	Men	
January 25, 2026	(United States); Tomoki Hiwatashi	Men	
February 16, 2026	(China); Sui Wenjing; Han Cong	Pairs	
February 28, 2026	(Japan); Mai Mihara	Women	
March 9, 2026	(Japan); Wakaba Higuchi	Women	
March 14, 2026	(Republic of Ireland); Carolane Soucisse; Shane Firus	Ice dance	
March 25, 2026	(United Kingdom); Kristen Spours	Women	
March 27, 2026	(Japan); Kaori Sakamoto	Women	
March 29, 2026	(Austria); Maurizio Zandron	Men	
March 31, 2026	(Japan); Hana Yoshida	Women	
April 2, 2026	(Finland); Linnea Ceder	Women	
April 5, 2026	(United Kingdom); Luke Digby	Pairs	
April 15, 2026	(Sweden); Josefin Taljegård	Women	
April 16, 2026	(Japan); Riku Miura; Ryuichi Kihara	Pairs	
April 19, 2026	(Poland); Ioulia Chtchetinina	Pairs	
April 28, 2026	(France); Marie Dupayage; Thomas Nabais	Ice dance	
May 4, 2026	(Italy); Rebecca Ghilardi	Pairs	
May 22, 2026	(Italy); Niccolò Macii	Pairs	
May 22, 2026	(Azerbaijan); Vladimir Litvintsev	Men	
June 24, 2026	(Lithuania); Paulina Ramanauskaitė	Ice dance	
June 24, 2026	(Belgium); Loena Hendrickx	Women	

=== Coaching changes ===
Date	Skater(s)	Disc.	From	To	Ref.
July 1, 2025	(Japan); Rena Uezono	Women	Mihoko Higuchi	Sonoko Nakano	
July 17, 2025	(South Korea); Shin Ji-a	Women	Brian Orser & Chi Hyun-jung	Chi Hyun-jung	
July 18, 2025	(South Korea); Lee Jae-keun	Men	Choi Hyung-kyung, Kim Na-hyun & Kim Min-seok	Chi Hyun-jung & Kim Jin-seo	
July 19, 2025	(Germany); Darya Grimm	Ice dance	Matteo Zanni, Barbora Řezníčková, Katharina Müller, Maurizio Margaglio & Neil Brown	Matteo Zanni, Barbora Řezníčková & Katharina Müller	
July 23, 2025	(Mexico); Andrea Montesinos Cantú	Women	Jozef Sabovčík	Jonathan Mills & Michael Gillman	
July 26, 2025	(Japan); Utana Yoshida; Masaya Morita	Ice dance	Cathy Reed & Rie Arikawa	Cathy Reed, Scott Moir, Madison Hubbell & Adrián Díaz	
July 27, 2025	(Lithuania); Jogailė Aglinskytė	Women	Dmitrij Kozlov	Kirill Khaliavin & Jūlija Tepliha	
July 27, 2025	(Lithuania); Meda Variakojytė	Women	Dmitrij Kozlov	Kirill Khaliavin & Jūlija Tepliha	
July 27, 2025	(Czech Republic); Eliška Březinová	Women	Rudolf Březina, Jozef Sabovčík & Michal Březina	Rafael Arutyunyan & Michal Březina	
July 27, 2025	(United States); Maxim Naumov	Men	Vadim Naumov & Evgenia Shishkova	Vladimir Petrenko & Benoît Richaud	
July 27, 2025	(Estonia); Aleksandr Selevko	Men	Irina Kononova & Katerina Kalenda	Alexei Letov, Olga Ganicheva, Irina Kononova & Rafael Arutyunyan	
July 28, 2025	(United States); Lucas Broussard	Men	Darin Hosier & Corrie Martin	Brian Orser & Tracy Wilson	
July 28, 2025	(South Korea); Minsol Kwon	Women	Chi Hyun-jung & Kim Jin-seo	Lee Barkell, Jeffrey Buttle & Jessica Wyant	
July 31, 2025	(Japan); Yuna Nagaoka; Sumitada Moriguchi	Pairs	Bruno Marcotte, Brian Shales, Mie Hamada, Cathy Reed, Satsuki Muramoto & Hiroaki Sato	Dmitri Savin, Fedor Klimov, Sofia Evdokimova, Mie Hamada, Cathy Reed, Satsuki Muramoto & Hiroaki Sato	
July 31, 2025	(Kazakhstan); Sofia Samodelkina	Women	Elmira Turganova	Rafael Arutyunyan	
August 1, 2025	(United States); Sonja Hilmer	Women	Tammy Gambill, Eddie Shipstad & Sandy Straub	Damon Allen & Eddie Shipstad	
August 24, 2025	(South Korea); Kim Chae-yeon	Women	Choi Hyung-kyung, Kim Na-hyun & Kim Min-seok	Choi Hyung-kyung, Lee Barkell, Kim Na-hyun & Jeffrey Buttle	
August 25, 2025	(Canada); Marie-Jade Lauriault; Romain Le Gac	Ice dance	Patrice Lauzon, Marie-France Dubreuil, Romain Haguenauer, Pascal Denis, Josée Piché & Benjamin Brisebois	Scott Moir, Madison Hubbell, Adrián Díaz, Patrice Lauzon, Marie-France Dubreuil, Romain Haguenauer, Pascal Denis, Josée Piché & Benjamin Brisebois	
September 2, 2025	(Switzerland); Gina Zehnder; Beda Leon Sieber	Ice dance	Cornelia Leroy & Alisa Besseghier	Alisa Besseghier & Lucie Myslivečková	
September 4, 2025	(Ukraine); Ivan Khobta	Pairs	Filip Zalevski	Drew Meekins, Natalia Mishkutenok & Filip Zalevski	
September 4, 2025	(Austria); Olga Mikutina	Women	Elena Romanova, Galit Chait & Evgeni Krasnopolski	Elena Romanova	
September 7, 2025	(Lithuania); Jogailė Aglinskytė	Women	Kirill Khaliavin & Jūlija Tepliha	Rosanna Murante & Tiziana Rosaspina	
September 14, 2025	(Canada); Nadiia Bashynska	Ice dance	Carol Lane, Jon Lane, Juris Razgulajevs & Marc-André Servant	Olivier Schoenfelder, Marien de la Asuncion, Muriel Zazoui, Scott Moir, Madison Hubbell & Adrián Díaz	
September 14, 2025	(Canada); Noé Perron	Ice dance	Olivier Schoenfelder, Marien de la Asuncion & Muriel Zazoui	Olivier Schoenfelder, Marien de la Asuncion, Muriel Zazoui, Scott Moir, Madison Hubbell & Adrián Díaz	
September 18, 2025	(China); Wang Shiyue; Liu Xinyu	Ice dance	Patrice Lauzon, Marie-France Dubreuil, Romain Haguenauer, Pascal Denis & Huang Guiyu	Patrice Lauzon, Pascal Denis, Huang Guiyu & Song Linshu	
October 1, 2025	(Russia); Kamila Valieva	Women	Eteri Tutberidze, Sergei Dudakov, Daniil Gleikhengauz & Georgi Pokhilyuk	Svetlana Sokolovskaya	
October 1, 2025	(South Korea); You Young	Women	Shin Hea-sook	Tammy Gambill & Choi Ji-eun	
October 11, 2025	(China); Jin Boyang	Men	Brian Orser, Tracy Wilson & Xu Zhaoxiao	Xu Zhaoxiao	
October 12, 2025	(Italy); Corey Circelli	Men	Brian Orser & Olga Romanova	Olga Romanova	
October 18, 2025	(Latvia); Deniss Vasiļjevs	Men	Stéphane Lambiel & Angelo Dolfini	Deniss Vasiļjevs	
October 25, 2025	(China); Zhu Yi	Women	Tong Jian	Fang Dan	
November 15, 2025	(United States); Jason Brown	Men	Tracy Wilson & Brian Orser	Tracy Wilson	
December 10, 2025	(Canada); Gabrielle Daleman	Women	Lee Barkell	Michael Hopfes	
December 11, 2025	(Japan); Rika Kihira	Ice dance	Brian Orser, Tracy Wilson, Paige Aistrop & Mie Hamada	Romain Haguenauer, Marie-France Dubreuil & Patrice Lauzon	
December 15, 2025	(United States); Isabella Flores	Ice dance	Elena Dostatni & Leifur Gislason	Muriel Zazoui, Marien de la Asuncion, Emi Hirai & Olivier Schoenfelder	
January 8, 2026	(United States); Elyce Lin-Gracey	Women	Tammy Gambill, Drew Meekins & Damon Allen	Drew Meekins, Sandy Straub & Damon Allen	
January 10, 2026	(Latvia); Deniss Vasiļjevs	Men	Deniss Vasiļjevs	Stéphane Lambiel & Angelo Dolfini	
January 10, 2026	(Australia); Hana Bath	Women	Taijin Hiraike & Yukako Sugita	Kensuke Nakaniwa, Makoto Nakata, Momoe Nagumo, Aya Tanoue & Niina Takeno	
January 15, 2026	(Lithuania); Meda Variakojytė	Women	Kirill Khaliavin & Jūlija Tepliha	Raimo Reinsalu & Olga Kovalkova	
January 20, 2026	(Russia); Alexandra Trusova	Women	Evgeni Plushenko	Eteri Tutberidze, Sergei Dudakov & Daniil Gleikhengauz	
February 15, 2026	(Japan); Rinka Watanabe	Women	Kensuke Nakaniwa, Makoto Nakata, Momoe Naguma, Aya Tanoue & Niina Takeno	Yusuke Hayashi	
February 20, 2026	(Individual Neutral Athletes); Viktoriia Safonova	Women	Oksana Matveeva	Oleg Vasiliev	
March 2, 2026	(Sweden); Andreas Nordebäck	Men	Mélanie Joseph & Christina Batian	Kevin Jasko & Tatiana Magnusson	
March 23, 2026	(Italy); Victoria Manni; Carlo Röthlisberger	Ice dance	Luca Lanotte	Barbara Fusar Poli & Charlie White	
March 24, 2026	(Armenia); Semen Daniliants	Men	Alexander Volkov & Martine Dagenais	Alexei Vasilevsky & Yulia Lavrenchuk	
April 15, 2026	(Estonia); Mihhail Selevko	Men	Irina Kononova & Rafael Arutyunyan	Svetlana Varnavskaja	
May 1, 2026	(United States); Sophie Joline von Felten	Women	Boyko Aleksiev, Denis Petukhov & Melissa Gregory	Vladimir Petrenko & Elena Petrenko	
May 5, 2026	(United States); Isabella Flores; Linus Colmor Jepsen	Ice dance	Muriel Zazoui, Marien de la Asuncion, Emi Hirai & Olivier Schoenfelder	Scott Moir, Madison Hubbell, Adrián Díaz & Cara Moir	
May 9, 2026	(Japan); Yuma Kagiyama	Men	Masakazu Kagiyama & Carolina Kostner	Masakazu Kagiyama	
May 11, 2026	(United States); Starr Andrews	Pairs	Derrick Delmore	Jenni Meno, Todd Sand, Brandon Frazier & Christine Binder	
May 12, 2026	(Canada); Fiona Bombardier	Pairs	Andrew Evans, Julie Marcotte & Josée Picard	Stéphanie Valois, Yvan Desjardins & Annie Barabé	
May 22, 2026	(Russia); Kseniia Sinitsyna	Women	Svetlana Panova & Tatiana Moiseeva	Evgeni Plushenko	
May 23, 2026	(Italy); Filippo Ambrosini	Pairs	Daniel Aggiano	Barbara Luoni	
May 23, 2026	(United States); Balázs Nagy	Pairs	Bruno Marcotte & Meagan Duhamel	Jenni Meno, Todd Sand, Brandon Frazier & Christine Binder	
June 5, 2026	(Australia); Haruna Murakami	Women	Mie Hamada, Hiroaki Sato & Satsuki Muramoto	Utako Nagamitsu & Yusuke Hayashi	
June 8, 2026	(Russia); Makar Ignatov	Men	Evgeni Plushenko	Eteri Tutberidze, Sergei Dudakov & Daniil Gleikhengauz	
June 11, 2026	(Switzerland); Kimmy Repond	Women	Jérômie Repond & Michael Huth	Luca Demattè	
June 13, 2026	(United States); Audrey Shin	Pairs	Bruno Marcotte & Meagan Duhamel	Alexei Letov & Olga Ganicheva	
June 16, 2026	(United States); Chelsea Liu; Ryan Bedard	Pairs	Jenni Meno, Brandon Frazier, Christine Fowler-Binder & Chris Pottenger	Bruno Marcotte, Russ Scott, Chris Pottenger & Anthony Evans	
June 25, 2026	(Belgium); Nina Pinzarrone	Women	Ans Bocklandt	Damon Allen, Tammy Gambill & Logan Giulietti-Schmitt	

=== Nationality changes ===
Date	Skater(s)	Disc.	From	To	Notes	Ref.
September 14, 2025	Noé Perron	Ice dance	France	Canada	Partnering with Nadiia Bashynska	
October 25, 2025	Minsol Kwon	Women	South Korea	Canada		
November 28, 2025	Marco Zandron	Pairs	Spain	Uzbekistan	Partnering with Ekaterina Geynish	
April 22, 2026	Haruna Murakami	Women	Japan	Australia		
April 27, 2026	Aleksandra Golovkina-Dolinskė	Women	Lithuania	Great Britain		
May 21, 2026	Veronika Zhilina	Women	Russia	Azerbaijan		
May 23, 2026	Milania Väänänen	Pairs	Finland	Italy	Partnering with Filippo Ambrosini	
June 1, 2026	Jean-Luc Baker	Ice dance	United States	Canada	Partnering with Marjorie Lajoie	
June 3, 2026	Luc Economides	Men	France	Romania		
June 15, 2026	Flavien Giniaux	Pairs	France	Great Britain	Partnering with Zarah Wood	
June 17, 2026	Rikako Fukase	Ice dance	Canada	Japan	Partnering with Atsuhiko Tamura	
June 19, 2026	Hannah Lim	Ice dance	South Korea	Canada	Partnering with Zachary Lagha	
June 25, 2026	Lori-Ann Matte	Pairs	France	Canada	Partnering with Thierry Ferland	

== International competitions ==
Scheduled competitions:

Code key

- S – Senior event
- J – Junior event
- N – Novice event
- M – Men's singles
- W – Women's singles
- P – Pair skating
- D – Ice dance

Color key

- Winter Olympics
- ISU Championships
- Grand Prix or Junior Grand Prix
- Challenger Series
- Other competition

2025
Dates	Event	Type	Level	Disc.	Location	Ref.
July 27–31	Lake Placid Ice Dance International	Other	All	D	Lake Placid, New York, United States	
August 1–4	Asian Open Trophy	Other	All	M/W/P	Manila, Philippines	
August 7–10	Cranberry Cup International	Challenger Series	S	M/W	Norwood, Massachusetts, United States	
August 7–10	Cranberry Cup International	Other	J/N	M/W	Norwood, Massachusetts, United States	
August 16–17	International ICE Dance Dordrecht	Other	All	D	Dordrecht, Netherlands	
August 20–23	JGP Latvia	Junior Grand Prix	J	All	Riga, Latvia	
August 21–22	Robin Cousins Cup	Other	S/J	M/W	Sheffield, England, United Kingdom	
August 21–22	Robin Cousins Cup	Other	J	P	Sheffield, England, United Kingdom	
August 27–30	JGP Turkey	Junior Grand Prix	J	All	Ankara, Turkey	
September 2–3	John Nicks International Pairs Competition	Challenger Series	S	P	New York City, New York, United States	
September 3–6	JGP Italy	Junior Grand Prix	J	M/W/D	Varese, Italy	
September 5–6	Bolero Cup	Other	All	D	Sheffield, England, United Kingdom	
September 5–7	Kinoshita Group Cup	Challenger Series	S	All	Osaka, Japan	
September 9–13	JGP Thailand	Junior Grand Prix	J	All	Bangkok, Thailand	
September 11–14	Lombardia Trophy	Challenger Series	S	M/W/D	Bergamo, Italy	
September 11–14	Lombardia Trophy	Other	S	P	Bergamo, Italy	
September 17–21	Skate to Milano	Other	S	All	Beijing, China	
September 24–27	JGP Azerbaijan	Junior Grand Prix	J	M/W/D	Baku, Azerbaijan	
September 25–27	Nepela Memorial	Challenger Series	S	M/W/D	Bratislava, Slovakia	
September 25–27	Nebelhorn Trophy	Challenger Series	S	All	Oberstdorf, Germany	
September 25–28	Crystal Skate Open	Other	S/J	M/W	Tallinn, Estonia	
September 27 – October 1	Swan Trophy	Other	All	M/W	Perth, Australia	
October 1–4	Denis Ten Memorial Challenge	Challenger Series	S	M/W/D	Almaty, Kazakhstan	
October 1–4	JGP Poland	Junior Grand Prix	J	All	Gdansk, Poland	
October 1–5	Trophée Métropole Nice Côte d'Azur	Other	S/J	All	Nice, France	
October 8–11	JGP United Arab Emirates	Junior Grand Prix	J	M/W/D	Abu Dhabi, United Arab Emirates	
October 8–11	Trialeti Trophy	Challenger Series	S	All	Tbilisi, Georgia	
October 10–12	Budapest Trophy	Other	S/J	M/W/D	Budapest, Hungary	
October 10–12	Budapest Trophy	Other	J	P	Budapest, Hungary	
October 10–12	Jelgava Cup	Other	S/J	M/W	Jelgava, Latvia	
October 11–12	Tayside Trophy	Other	S/J	M/W	Dundee, Scotland, United Kingdom	
October 15–19	Lõunakeskus Trophy	Other	All	M/W	Tartu, Estonia	
October 15–19	Mezzaluna Cup	Other	All	D	Mentana, Italy	
October 16–19	Diamond Spin	Other	All	M/W/P	Katowice, Poland	
October 17–19	Grand Prix de France	Grand Prix	S	All	Angers, France	
October 20–25	Gordion Cup	Other	All	M/W/D	Ankara, Turkey	
October 23–26	Swiss Open	Other	All	M/W/D	Lausanne, Switzerland	
October 23–26	Golden Bear of Zagreb	Other	All	M/W/P	Zagreb, Croatia	
October 24–26	Cup of China	Grand Prix	S	All	Chongqing, China	
October 30 – November 2	Tirnavia Ice Cup	Other	All	M/W	Trnava, Slovakia	
October 30 – November 2	Tirnavia Ice Cup	Other	J	P	Trnava, Slovakia	
October 30 – November 2	Northern Lights Trophy	Other	All	M/W/P	Reykjavík, Iceland	
October 31 – November 2	Skate Canada International	Grand Prix	S	All	Saskatoon, Saskatchewan, Canada	
November 4–9	Denkova-Staviski Cup	Other	All	M/W/D	Sofia, Bulgaria	
November 5–9	56th Volvo Open Cup	Other	S/J	M/W	Riga, Latvia	
November 5–9	Ice Challenge	Other	All	All	Graz, Austria	
November 7–9	NHK Trophy	Grand Prix	S	All	Kadoma, Osaka, Japan	
November 13–16	Cup of Innsbruck	Other	All	All	Innsbruck, Austria	
November 13–16	NRW Trophy	Other	All	All	Dortmund, Germany	
November 13–16	Skate Celje	Other	All	M/W	Celje, Slovenia	
November 14–16	Pavel Roman Memorial	Other	All	D	Olomouc, Czech Republic	
November 14–16	Skate America	Grand Prix	S	All	Lake Placid, New York, United States	
November 19–23	Warsaw Cup	Challenger Series	S	M/W/D	Warsaw, Poland	
November 19–23	Warsaw Cup	Other	S	P	Warsaw, Poland	
November 21–23	Amber Cup	Other	All	M/W	Riga, Latvia	
November 21–23	Finlandia Trophy	Grand Prix	S	All	Helsinki, Finland	
November 24–30	Bosphorus Cup	Other	All	M/W/D	Istanbul, Turkey	
November 25–30	Tallinn Trophy	Challenger Series	S	M/W/D	Tallinn, Estonia	
November 25–30	Tallinn Trophy	Other	J/N	M/W/D	Tallinn, Estonia	
November 26–30	Santa Claus Cup	Other	All	M/W/D	Budapest, Hungary	
December 3–6	Golden Spin of Zagreb	Challenger Series	S	All	Zagreb, Croatia	
December 4–7	Grand Prix Final	Grand Prix	S/J	All	Nagoya, Japan	
December 11–13	Southeast Asian Games	Other	S	M/W	Bangkok, Thailand	

2026
Dates	Event	Type	Level	Disc.	Location	Ref.
January 6–11	Sofia Trophy	Other	All	M/W/D	Sofia, Bulgaria	
January 13–18	European Championships	Championship	S	All	Sheffield, England, United Kingdom	
January 14–18	Crystal Skate of Romania	Other	S/J	M/W	Bucharest, Romania	
January 21–25	Four Continents Championships	Championship	S	All	Beijing, China	
January 21–25	57th Volvo Open Cup	Other	S/J	M/W	Riga, Latvia	
January 22–25	International Challenge Cup	Other	All	All	Tilburg, Netherlands	
January 22–25	Merano Ice Trophy	Other	All	M/W	Merano, Italy	
January 27 – February 1	Bavarian Open	Other	All	All	Oberstdorf, Germany	
January 27 – February 1	EDGE Cup	Other	All	M/W/D	Katowice, Poland	
January 28 – February 1	Nordics Open	Other	All	M/W	Copenhagen, Denmark	
January 29 – February 1	Silver Skate Winter Cup	Other	S/J	M/W	Kaunas, Lithuania	
February 5–8	Dragon Trophy & Tivoli Cup	Other	All	M/W	Ljubljana, Slovenia	
February 5–8	Skate Fehervar	Other	S/J	M/W	Székesfehérvár, Hungary	
February 6–22	Winter Olympics	Olympics	S	All	Milan and Cortina d'Ampezzo, Italy	
February 14–15	Finnish Ice Dance Open	Other	S	D	Helsinki, Finland	
February 18–22	Skate Berlin	Other	S	M/W/D	Berlin, Germany	
February 18–22	Skate Berlin	Other	J/N	All	Berlin, Germany	
February 19–22	Tallink Hotels Cup	Other	S/J	M/W	Tallinn, Estonia	
February 24 – March 1	Maria Olszewska Memorial	Other	All	M/W/D	Łódź, Poland	
February 24 – March 1	Maria Olszewska Memorial	Other	J	P	Łódź, Poland	
February 25 – March 1	Bellu Memorial	Other	All	M/W	Bucharest, Romania	
March 3–8	World Junior Championships	Championship	J	All	Tallinn, Estonia	
March 5–8	Sonja Henie Trophy	Other	All	M/W	Oslo, Norway	
March 11–14	Denver International	Other	All	M/W	Denver, Colorado, United States	
March 11–14	Denver International	Other	J/N	P	Denver, Colorado, United States	
March 12–15	Daugava Open Cup	Other	S/J	M/W	Riga, Latvia	
March 13–15	Coupe du Printemps	Other	All	M/W	Kockelscheuer, Luxembourg	
March 19–22	European Wulfenia Cup	Other	S	W	Pontebba, Italy	
March 19–22	European Wulfenia Cup	Other	J	M/W	Pontebba, Italy	
March 20–22	Crystal Skate Spring	Other	All	M/W	Tallinn, Estonia	
March 24–29	World Championships	Championship	S	All	Prague, Czech Republic	
March 26–29	#nextgen Icestars	Other	All	M/W	Graz, Austria	
April 1–5	Black Sea Ice Cup	Other	All	M/W	Kranevo, Bulgaria	
April 4–6	Rooster Cup Lakes Trophy	Other	N	M/W	Meudon, France	
April 8–12	Triglav Trophy and Narcisa Cup	Other	All	M/W	Jesenice, Slovenia	
May 1–4	Thailand Open Trophy	Other	All	M/W	Bangkok, Thailand	
May 19–21	Oceania International	Other	All	W	Auckland, New Zealand	
May 19–21	Oceania International	Other	J/N	M	Auckland, New Zealand	

=== Postponed ===
2026
Dates	Event	Type	Level	Disc.	Location	Ref.
February 5–8	Skate Helena	Other	All	M/W	Belgrade, Serbia	

=== Cancelled ===
2025–26
Dates	Event	Type	Location	Ref.
September 30 – October 4	Gulf Cup	Other	Kocaeli, Turkey	
November 19–23	Open d'Andorra	Other	Canillo, Andorra	
November 27–29	Asean Trophy	Other	Kuala Lumpur, Malaysia	
December 8–14	EduSport Trophy	Other	Bucharest, Romania	
December 15–21	Ephesus Cup	Other	İzmir, Turkey	
January 22–25	Union Trophy	Other	Abu Dhabi, United Arab Emirates	

== International medalists ==
=== Men's singles ===
Olympics
Competition	Gold	Silver	Bronze	Ref.
(Italy) Winter Olympics	(Kazakhstan) Mikhail Shaidorov	(Japan) Yuma Kagiyama	(Japan) Shun Sato	

Championships
Competition	Gold	Silver	Bronze	Ref.
(United Kingdom) European Championships	(Georgia (country)) Nika Egadze	(Italy) Matteo Rizzo	(Czech Republic) Georgii Reshtenko	
(China) Four Continents Championships	(Japan) Kao Miura	(South Korea) Cha Jun-hwan	(Japan) Sōta Yamamoto	
(Estonia) World Junior Championships	(Japan) Rio Nakata	(South Korea) Seo Min-kyu	(Japan) Taiga Nishino	
(Czech Republic) World Championships	(United States) Ilia Malinin	(Japan) Yuma Kagiyama	(Japan) Shun Sato	

Grand Prix
Competition	Gold	Silver	Bronze	Ref.
Grand Prix de France	(United States) Ilia Malinin	(France) Adam Siao Him Fa	(Georgia (country)) Nika Egadze	
Cup of China	(Japan) Shun Sato	(Italy) Daniel Grassl	(Kazakhstan) Mikhail Shaidorov	
Skate Canada International	(United States) Ilia Malinin	(Estonia) Aleksandr Selevko	(Japan) Kao Miura	
(Japan) NHK Trophy	(Japan) Yuma Kagiyama	(Japan) Shun Sato	(Switzerland) Lukas Britschgi	
(United States) Skate America	(France) Kévin Aymoz	(Kazakhstan) Mikhail Shaidorov	(Japan) Kazuki Tomono	
(Finland) Finlandia Trophy	(Japan) Yuma Kagiyama	(France) Adam Siao Him Fa	(Canada) Stephen Gogolev	
(Japan) Grand Prix Final	(United States) Ilia Malinin	(Japan) Yuma Kagiyama	(Japan) Shun Sato	

Junior Grand Prix
Competition	Gold	Silver	Bronze	Ref.
JGP Latvia	(Japan) Rio Nakata	(Canada) Grayson Long	(Germany) Genrikh Gartung	
JGP Turkey	(South Korea) Seo Min-kyu	(Japan) Sena Takahashi	(United States) Lucius Kazanecki	
JGP Italy	(Japan) Taiga Nishino	(South Korea) Choi Ha-bin	(Japan) Shun Uemura	
JGP Thailand	(Japan) Rio Nakata	(United States) Patrick Blackwell	(New Zealand) Yanhao Li	
JGP Azerbaijan	(South Korea) Seo Min-kyu	(Belgium) Denis Krouglov	(United States) Caleb Farrington	
JGP Poland	(South Korea) Choi Ha-bin	(Japan) Taiga Nishino	(Germany) Genrikh Gartung	
JGP United Arab Emirates	(United States) Lucius Kazanecki	(Belgium) Denis Krouglov	(Japan) Sena Takahashi	
(Japan) Junior Grand Prix Final	(South Korea) Seo Min-kyu	(Japan) Rio Nakata	(United States) Lucius Kazanecki	

Challenger Series
Competition	Gold	Silver	Bronze	Ref.
(United States) Cranberry Cup International	(Canada) Roman Sadovsky	(Estonia) Aleksandr Selevko	(Canada) Stephen Gogolev	
(Japan) Kinoshita Group Cup	(South Korea) Cha Jun-hwan	(Japan) Kazuki Tomono	(United States) Tomoki Hiwatashi	
(Italy) Lombardia Trophy	(United States) Ilia Malinin	(Japan) Yuma Kagiyama	(Italy) Nikolaj Memola	
(Germany) Nebelhorn Trophy	(Canada) Stephen Gogolev	(United States) Andrew Torgashev	(Switzerland) Lukas Britschgi	
(Slovakia) Nepela Memorial	(France) Kévin Aymoz	(Italy) Matteo Rizzo	(Italy) Daniel Grassl	
(Kazakhstan) Denis Ten Memorial Challenge	(Kazakhstan) Mikhail Shaidorov	(Georgia (country)) Nika Egadze	(United States) Jason Brown	
(Georgia (country)) Trialeti Trophy	(Georgia (country)) Nika Egadze	(United States) Jason Brown	(United States) Tomoki Hiwatashi	
(Poland) Warsaw Cup	(Poland) Vladimir Samoilov	(Switzerland) Lukas Britschgi	(France) Samy Hammi	
(Estonia) Tallinn Trophy	(Estonia) Aleksandr Selevko	(Italy) Matteo Rizzo	(Estonia) Arlet Levandi	
(Croatia) Golden Spin of Zagreb	(France) Kévin Aymoz	(Estonia) Arlet Levandi	(France) Luc Economides	

Other international competitions
Competition	Gold	Silver	Bronze	Ref.
(Philippines) Asian Open Trophy	(South Korea) Kim Hyun-gyeom	(Chinese Taipei) Li Yu-Hsiang	(North Korea) Han Kwang-bom	
(United Kingdom) Robin Cousins Cup	(Austria) Maurizio Zandron	(United States) Michael Xie	(United States) Samuel Mindra	
(China) Skate to Milano	(Individual Neutral Athletes) Petr Gumennik	(South Korea) Kim Hyun-gyeom	(Mexico) Donovan Carrillo	
(Estonia) Crystal Skate Open	(Estonia) Arlet Levandi	(Switzerland) Ean Weiler	(Switzerland) Georgii Pavlov	
(France) Trophée Métropole Nice Côte d'Azur	(France) Adam Siao Him Fa	(France) Samy Hammi	(Monaco) Davide Lewton Brain	
(Hungary) Budapest Trophy	(France) Landry Le May	(Switzerland) Georgii Pavlov	(Germany) Arthur Wolfgang Mai	
(Latvia) Jelgava Cup	(Latvia) Fedirs Kuļišs	(Latvia) Kirills Korkacs	(Spain) Adrian Jimenez de Baldomero	
(United Kingdom) Tayside Trophy	(Croatia) Jari Kessler	(Austria) Maurizio Zandron	(United States) Michael Xie	
(Estonia) Lõunakeskus Trophy	(Estonia) Arlet Levandi	(Finland) Arttu Juusola	(France) Ian Vauclin	
(Poland) Diamond Spin	(Poland) Kornel Witkowski	(Germany) Genrikh Gartung	(Poland) Jakub Lofek	
(Turkey) Gordion Cup	(France) Samy Hammi	(France) Xan Rols	No other competitors	
(Switzerland) Swiss Open	(Italy) Matteo Rizzo	(Italy) Corey Circelli	(Monaco) Davide Lewton Brain	
(Croatia) Golden Bear of Zagreb	(Croatia) Jari Kessler	(Czech Republic) Filip Ščerba	(Czech Republic) Tadeáš Václavík	
(Slovakia) Tirnavia Ice Cup	(France) Ian Vauclin	(Ukraine) Vadym Novikov	(Slovakia) Jozef Curma	
(Bulgaria) Denkova-Staviski Cup	(Israel) Tamir Kuperman	(Turkey) Alp Eren Özkan	(Czech Republic) Tadeas Vaclavik	
(Latvia) 56th Volvo Open Cup	(Estonia) Arlet Levandi	(Ukraine) Kyrylo Marsak	(Latvia) Fedirs Kuļišs	
(Austria) Ice Challenge	(United States) Maxim Naumov	(United States) Jacob Sanchez	(Canada) Grayson Long	
(Austria) Cup of Innsbruck	(Monaco) Davide Lewton Brain	(Austria) Maurizio Zandron	(Poland) Jakub Lofek	
(Germany) NRW Trophy	(France) Samy Hammi	(Spain) Tomàs-Llorenç Guarino Sabaté	(Germany) Nikita Starostin	
(Slovenia) Skate Celje	(Austria) Maksym Petrychenko	(Slovakia) Jozef Curma	No other competitors	
(Turkey) Bosphorus Cup	(Turkey) Alp Eren Özkan	(Kazakhstan) Nikita Krivosheyev	(Czech Republic) Tadeas Vaclavik	
(Hungary) Santa Claus Cup	(Chinese Taipei) Li Yu-Hsiang	(Germany) Arthur Wolfgang Mai	(Slovenia) David Sedej	
(Thailand) Southeast Asian Games	(Malaysia) Fang Ze Zeng	(Thailand) Aaron Kulvatunyou	(Philippines) Paolo Borromeo	
(Bulgaria) Sofia Trophy	(Italy) Corey Circelli	(Chinese Taipei) Li Yu-Hsiang	(Bulgaria) Alexander Zlatkov	
(Latvia) 57th Volvo Open Cup	(Estonia) Arlet Levandi	(Latvia) Fedirs Kuļišs	(Finland) Valtter Virtanen	
(Italy) Merano Ice Trophy	(Ukraine) Kyrylo Marsak	(Italy) Corey Circelli	(France) Corentin Spinar	
(Germany) Bavarian Open	(Czech Republic) Georgii Reshtenko	(Switzerland) Ean Weiler	(Poland) Kornel Witkowski	
(Poland) EDGE Cup	(Poland) Matvii Yefymenko	(Switzerland) Aurelian Chervet	(Slovakia) Jozef Curma	
(Norway) Nordic Championships	(Sweden) Hugo Bostedt	(Finland) Arttu Juusola	No other competitors	
(Lithuania) Silver Skate Winter Cup	(Latvia) Fedirs Kuļišs	(Latvia) Kirills Korkacs	(Ukraine) Sergey Sokolov	
(Slovenia) Dragon Trophy and Tivoli Cup	(Slovenia) David Sedej	(Bulgaria) Larry Loupolover	(Republic of Ireland) Dillon Judge	
(Germany) Skate Berlin	(United States) Daniel Martynov	(Israel) Tamir Kuperman	(Israel) Lev Vinokur	
(Estonia) Tallink Hotels Cup	(Estonia) Arlet Levandi	(Croatia) Jari Kessler	(Monaco) Davide Lewton Brain	
(Poland) Maria Olszewska Memorial	(Sweden) Andreas Nordebäck	(Poland) Kornel Witkowski	(Austria) Maurizio Zandron	
(Romania) Bellu Memorial	(France) François Pitot	(France) Luc Economides	(Italy) Matteo Nalbone	
(Norway) Sonja Henie Trophy	(Estonia) Arlet Levandi	(France) Samy Hammi	(Sweden) Andreas Nordebäck	
(United States) Denver International	(United Kingdom) Lucas Fitterer	(United Kingdom) Ken Fitterer	No other competitors	
(Latvia) Daugava Open Cup	(Spain) Andre Zapata	(Latvia) Fedirs Kuļišs	(Spain) Pablo Garcia	
(Luxembourg) Coupe du Printemps	(United States) Daniel Martynov	(Japan) Kazuki Tomono	(Japan) Nozomu Yoshioka	
(Estonia) Crystal Skate Spring	(Estonia) Arlet Levandi	(Latvia) Nikolajs Krivoseja	(Bulgaria) Larry Loupolover	
(Austria) #nextgen Icestars	(Spain) Daniel Rouco Morcillo	(Spain) Iker Oyarzabal Albás	(Austria) Anton Skoficz	
(Bulgaria) Black Sea Ice Cup	(Spain) Euken Alberdi	(Bulgaria) Filip Kaimakchiev	(Bulgaria) Larry Loupolover	
(Slovenia) Triglav Trophy and Narcisa Cup	(Italy) Matteo Nalbone	(Slovenia) David Sedej	(United Kingdom) Arin Yorke	
Thailand Open Trophy	(Malaysia) Fang Ze Zeng	(Australia) Douglas Gerber	(Hong Kong) Lap Kan Lincoln Yuen	

=== Women’s singles ===
Olympics
Competition	Gold	Silver	Bronze	Ref.
(Italy) Winter Olympics	(United States) Alysa Liu	(Japan) Kaori Sakamoto	(Japan) Ami Nakai	

Championships
Competition	Gold	Silver	Bronze	Ref.
(United Kingdom) European Championships	(Estonia) Niina Petrõkina	(Belgium) Loena Hendrickx	(Italy) Lara Naki Gutmann	
(China) Four Continents Championships	(Japan) Yuna Aoki	(Japan) Ami Nakai	(Japan) Mone Chiba	
(Estonia) World Junior Championships	(Japan) Mao Shimada	(Australia) Hana Bath	(Japan) Mayuko Oka	
(Czech Republic) World Championships	(Japan) Kaori Sakamoto	(Japan) Mone Chiba	(Belgium) Nina Pinzarrone	

Grand Prix
Competition	Gold	Silver	Bronze	Ref.
Grand Prix de France	(Japan) Ami Nakai	(Japan) Kaori Sakamoto	(Japan) Rion Sumiyoshi	
Cup of China	(United States) Amber Glenn	(United States) Alysa Liu	(Japan) Rinka Watanabe	
Skate Canada International	(Japan) Mone Chiba	(United States) Isabeau Levito	(Japan) Ami Nakai	
(Japan) NHK Trophy	(Japan) Kaori Sakamoto	(Kazakhstan) Sofia Samodelkina	(Belgium) Loena Hendrickx	
(United States) Skate America	(United States) Alysa Liu	(Japan) Rinka Watanabe	(Georgia (country)) Anastasiia Gubanova	
(Finland) Finlandia Trophy	(Japan) Mone Chiba	(United States) Amber Glenn	(Japan) Rino Matsuike	
(Japan) Grand Prix Final	(United States) Alysa Liu	(Japan) Ami Nakai	(Japan) Kaori Sakamoto	

Junior Grand Prix
Competition	Gold	Silver	Bronze	Ref.
JGP Latvia	(Japan) Mei Okada	(South Korea) Huh Ji-yu	(Switzerland) Elisabeth Dibbern	
JGP Turkey	(Japan) Mayuko Oka	(South Korea) Kim Yu-jae	(United States) Sophie Joline von Felten	
JGP Italy	(Japan) Sumika Kanazawa	(South Korea) Youn Seo-jin	(China) Wang Yihan	
JGP Thailand	(Japan) Mao Shimada	(Japan) Mei Okada	(South Korea) Hwang Jeong-yul	
JGP Azerbaijan	(South Korea) Kim Yu-seong	(Japan) Mayuko Oka	(Israel) Sophia Shifrin	
JGP Poland	(South Korea) Kim Yu-jae	(Slovakia) Alica Lengyelova	(United States) Sophie Joline von Felten	
JGP United Arab Emirates	(Japan) Mao Shimada	(Australia) Hana Bath	(Israel) Sophia Shifrin	
(Japan) Junior Grand Prix Final	(Japan) Mao Shimada	(South Korea) Kim Yu-seong	(Japan) Mei Okada	

Challenger Series
Competition	Gold	Silver	Bronze	Ref.
(United States) Cranberry Cup International	(United States) Isabeau Levito	(Kazakhstan) Sofia Samodelkina	(South Korea) Shin Ji-a	
(Japan) Kinoshita Group Cup	(Japan) Mone Chiba	(Japan) Kaori Sakamoto	(Japan) Saki Miyake	
(Italy) Lombardia Trophy	(Japan) Rion Sumiyoshi	(Japan) Ami Nakai	(United States) Sarah Everhardt	
(Germany) Nebelhorn Trophy	(United States) Amber Glenn	(Japan) Mone Chiba	(South Korea) Shin Ji-a	
(Slovakia) Nepela Memorial	(Italy) Lara Naki Gutmann	(Italy) Anna Pezzetta	(Italy) Sarina Joos	
(Kazakhstan) Denis Ten Memorial Challenge	(South Korea) Lee Hae-in	(South Korea) Yun Ah-sun	(Canada) Madeline Schizas	
(Georgia (country)) Trialeti Trophy	(Georgia (country)) Anastasiia Gubanova	(Israel) Mariia Seniuk	(South Korea) Lee Hae-in	
(Poland) Warsaw Cup	(Canada) Sara-Maude Dupuis	(Italy) Marina Piredda	(Norway) Mia Risa Gomez	
(Estonia) Tallinn Trophy	(Finland) Olivia Lisko	(United States) Sarah Everhardt	(United States) Alina Bonillo	
(Croatia) Golden Spin of Zagreb	(United States) Bradie Tennell	(Finland) Iida Karhunen	(Kazakhstan) Sofia Samodelkina	

Other international competitions
Competition	Gold	Silver	Bronze	Ref.
(Philippines) Asian Open Trophy	(China) Zhang Ruiyang	(China) Zhu Yi	(China) Xu Wandi	
(United Kingdom) Robin Cousins Cup	(Italy) Sarina Joos	(Cyprus) Stefania Yakovleva	(United States) Alex Evans	
(China) Skate to Milano	(Individual Neutral Athletes) Adeliia Petrosian	(Georgia (country)) Anastasiia Gubanova	(Belgium) Loena Hendrickx	
(Estonia) Crystal Skate Open	(Finland) Linnea Ceder	(Estonia) Kristina Lisovskaja	(Philippines) Cathryn Limketkai	
(Australia) Swan Trophy	(Australia) Tia Hochmann	(Indonesia) Michelle Edgina Axille	(Philippines) Skye Frances Patenia	
(France) Trophée Métropole Nice Côte d'Azur	(France) Léa Serna	(Switzerland) Sara Franzi	(Bulgaria) Alexandra Feigin	
(Hungary) Budapest Trophy	(Poland) Ekaterina Kurakova	(Moldova) Anastasia Gracheva	(Norway) Mia Risa Gomez	
(Latvia) Jelgava Cup	(Ukraine) Taisiia Spesivtseva	(Finland) Heidi Moisio	(Latvia) Emilija Ozola	
(United Kingdom) Tayside Trophy	(United States) Alina Bonillo	(United States) Alexa Gasparotto	(United Kingdom) Nina Povey	
(Estonia) Lõunakeskus Trophy	(Austria) Olga Mikutina	(Estonia) Kristina Lisovskaja	(Finland) Minja Peltonen	
(Poland) Diamond Spin	(Italy) Sarina Joos	(Lithuania) Jogailė Aglinskytė	(Czech Republic) Eliška Březinová	
(Turkey) Gordion Cup	(Cyprus) Stefania Yakovleva	(Belgium) Jade Hovine	(Turkey) Salma Agamova	
(Croatia) Golden Bear of Zagreb	(Slovenia) Julija Lovrenčič	(Italy) Ginevra Lavinia Negrello	(Spain) Ariadna Gupta Espada	
(Switzerland) Swiss Open	(Austria) Olga Mikutina	(Finland) Olivia Lisko	(France) Léa Serna	
(Iceland) Northern Lights Trophy	(Sweden) Lovisa Aav	(Poland) Marietta Atkins	No other competitors	
(Slovakia) Tirnavia Ice Cup	(France) Lorine Schild	(France) Eve Dubecq	(United Kingdom) Nina Povey	
(Bulgaria) Denkova-Staviski Cup	(Spain) Ariadna Gupta Espada	(Bulgaria) Alexandra Feigin	(Italy) Elena Agostinelli	
(Austria) Ice Challenge	(Canada) Gabrielle Daleman	(Canada) Kaiya Ruiter	(Austria) Olga Mikutina	
(Latvia) 56th Volvo Open Cup	(Finland) Iida Karhunen	(Sweden) Josefin Taljegård	(Lithuania) Meda Variakojytė	
(Austria) Cup of Innsbruck	(Norway) Mia Risa Gomez	(Austria) Olga Mikutina	(Czech Republic) Barbora Vrankova	
(Germany) NRW Trophy	(Netherlands) Niki Wories	(Czech Republic) Eliška Březinová	(United Kingdom) Nina Povey	
(Slovenia) Skate Celje	(Slovenia) Julija Lovrencic	(Czech Republic) Michaela Vrastakova	(India) Tara Prasad	
(Latvia) Amber Cup	(Estonia) Karoliine Raudsepp	(Latvia) Ksenija Heimane	(Latvia) Angelīna Kučvaļska	
(Turkey) Bosphorus Cup	(Azerbaijan) Nargiz Süleymanova	(India) Tara Prasad	(Slovenia) Julija Lovrenčič	
(Hungary) Santa Claus Cup	(Mexico) Andrea Montesinos Cantú	(United States) Kendall Erne	(Switzerland) Sara Franzi	
(Hungary) Skate Fehervar	(Romania) Julia Sauter	(Switzerland) Chiara Schoell	(Serbia) Antonina Dubinina	
(Thailand) Southeast Asian Games	(Thailand) Phattaratida Kaneshige	(Philippines) Maxine Marie Bautista	(Thailand) Pimmpida Lerdpraiwan	
(Bulgaria) Sofia Trophy	(Czech Republic) Barbora Vrankova	(Finland) Olivia Lisko	(Switzerland) Sara Franzi	
Crystal Skate of Romania	(Finland) Olivia Lisko	(Israel) Mariia Dmitrieva	(Poland) Marietta Atkins	
(Latvia) 57th Volvo Open Cup	(Estonia) Nataly Langerbaur	(Lithuania) Meda Variakojytė	(Israel) Elizabet Gervits	
(Netherlands) International Challenge Cup	(Netherlands) Niki Wories	(Germany) Sarah Marie Pesch	(Netherlands) Jolanda Vos	
(Italy) Merano Ice Trophy	(Italy) Marina Piredda	(Azerbaijan) Nargiz Süleymanova	(Czech Republic) Barbora Vrankova	
(Germany) Bavarian Open	(United States) Alina Bonillo	(Czech Republic) Eliška Březinová	(Germany) Sarah Marie Pesch	
(Poland) EDGE Cup	(Slovakia) Vanesa Šelmeková	(United Kingdom) Nina Povey	(Lithuania) Jogailė Aglinskytė	
(Norway) Nordics Open	(Finland) Iida Karhunen	(Norway) Mia Risa Gomez	(Finland) Olivia Lisko	
(Lithuania) Silver Skate Winter Cup	(Estonia) Kristina Lisovskaja	(India) Tara Prasad	(Latvia) Nikola Fomchenkova	
(Slovenia) Dragon Trophy and Tivoli Cup	(Czech Republic) Michaela Vrašťáková	(Austria) Flora Marie Schaller	(Denmark) Anna-Flora Colmor Jepsen	
(Germany) Skate Berlin	(Italy) Marina Piredda	(Slovakia) Vanesa Šelmeková	(Finland) Oona Ounasvuori	
(Estonia) Tallink Hotels Cup	(Finland) Olivia Lisko	(Estonia) Nataly Langerbaur	(Sweden) Josefin Taljegård	
(Poland) Maria Olszewska Memorial	(Estonia) Kristina Lisovskaja	(Latvia) Nikola Fomchenkova	(Germany) Julia Grabowski	
(Romania) Bellu Memorial	(Israel) Elizabet Gervits	(Turkey) Salma Agamova	(Poland) Marietta Atkins	
(Norway) Sonja Henie Trophy	(Finland) Olivia Lisko	(Norway) Mia Risa Gomez	(Estonia) Olesja Leonova	
(United States) Denver International	(Czech Republic) Eliška Březinová	(Mexico) Gloria Angélica Carrasco Carcaño	(Ecuador) Dominique Oña	
(Latvia) Daugava Open Cup	(Estonia) Kristina Lisovskaja	(Latvia) Nikola Fomchenkova	(Poland) Marietta Atkins	
(Luxembourg) Coupe du Printemps	(Japan) Mana Kawabe	(Japan) Rinka Watanabe	(Italy) Marina Piredda	
(Italy) European Wulfenia Cup	(Italy) Ginevra Lavinia Negrello	(Italy) Gioia Fiori	(Switzerland) Sara Franzi	
(Estonia) Crystal Skate Spring	(Estonia) Kristina Lisovskaja	(Estonia) Olesja Leonova	(Georgia (country)) Ekaterine Iazadzhi	
(Austria) #nextgen Icestars	(Austria) Flora Schaller	(Spain) Lucia Ruiz Manzano	No other competitors	
(Bulgaria) Black Sea Ice Cup	(United Kingdom) Genevieve Somerville	(Slovakia) Ana Šćepanović	(Greece) Elisavet Voulgari	
(Slovenia) Triglav Trophy and Narcisa Cup	(Italy) Ginevra Lavinia Negrello	(Italy) Gioia Fiori	(Serbia) Mariia Kryzhova	
Thailand Open Trophy	(Hong Kong) Chloe Desiree Leung	(Thailand) Nutcha Doltanakarn	(Kazakhstan) Nuriya Suleimen	
(New Zealand) Oceania International	(Sweden) Josefin Taljegård	(Greece) Dimitra Korri	(Philippines) Skye Frances Patenia	

=== Pairs ===
Olympics
Competition	Gold	Silver	Bronze	Ref.
(Italy) Winter Olympics	(Japan); Riku Miura; Ryuichi Kihara	(Georgia (country)); Anastasiia Metelkina; Luka Berulava	(Germany); Minerva Fabienne Hase; Nikita Volodin	

Championships
Competition	Gold	Silver	Bronze	Ref.
(United Kingdom) European Championships	(Georgia (country)); Anastasiia Metelkina; Luka Berulava	(Germany); Minerva Fabienne Hase; Nikita Volodin	(Hungary); Maria Pavlova; Alexei Sviatchenko	
(China) Four Continents Championships	(United States); Alisa Efimova; Misha Mitrofanov	(China); Sui Wenjing; Han Cong	(Japan); Yuna Nagaoka; Sumitada Moriguchi	
(Estonia) World Junior Championships	(Canada); Ava Kemp; Yohnatan Elizarov	(Canada); Jazmine Desrochers; Kieran Thrasher	(Ukraine); Hannah Herrera; Ivan Khobta	
(Czech Republic) World Championships	(Germany); Minerva Fabienne Hase; Nikita Volodin	(Georgia (country)); Anastasiia Metelkina; Luka Berulava	(Canada); Lia Pereira; Trennt Michaud	

Grand Prix
Competition	Gold	Silver	Bronze	Ref.
Grand Prix de France	(Japan); Riku Miura; Ryuichi Kihara	(Canada); Deanna Stellato-Dudek; Maxime Deschamps	(Hungary); Maria Pavlova; Alexei Sviatchenko	
Cup of China	(Georgia (country)); Anastasiia Metelkina; Luka Berulava	(Italy); Sara Conti; Niccolò Macii	(China); Sui Wenjing; Han Cong	
Skate Canada International	(Canada); Deanna Stellato-Dudek; Maxime Deschamps	(Germany); Minerva Fabienne Hase; Nikita Volodin	(United States); Ellie Kam; Daniel O'Shea	
(Japan) NHK Trophy	(Italy); Sara Conti; Niccolò Macii	(Hungary); Maria Pavlova; Alexei Sviatchenko	(China); Sui Wenjing; Han Cong	
(United States) Skate America	(Japan); Riku Miura; Ryuichi Kihara	(Georgia (country)); Anastasiia Metelkina; Luka Berulava	(Canada); Kelly Ann Laurin; Loucas Éthier	
(Finland) Finlandia Trophy	(Germany); Minerva Fabienne Hase; Nikita Volodin	(United States); Alisa Efimova; Misha Mitrofanov	(United States); Ellie Kam; Daniel O'Shea	
(Japan) Grand Prix Final	(Japan); Riku Miura; Ryuichi Kihara	(Italy); Sara Conti; Niccolò Macii	(Germany); Minerva Fabienne Hase; Nikita Volodin	

Junior Grand Prix
Competition	Gold	Silver	Bronze	Ref.
JGP Latvia	(Canada); Ava Kemp; Yohnatan Elizarov	(China); Zhang Xuanqi; Feng Wenqiang	(United States); Naomi Williams; Lachlan Lewer	
JGP Turkey	(Canada); Ava Kemp; Yohnatan Elizarov	(China); Guo Rui; Zhang Yiwen	(Canada); Julia Quattrocchi; Étienne Lacasse	
JGP Thailand	(China); Guo Rui; Zhang Yiwen	(Canada); Jazmine Desrochers; Kieran Thrasher	(United States); Sofia Jarmoc; Luke Witkowski	
JGP Poland	(China); Zhang Xuanqi; Feng Wenqiang	(Canada); Jazmine Desrochers; Kieran Thrasher	(China); Chen Yuxuan; Dong Yinbo	
(Japan) Junior Grand Prix Final	(China); Guo Rui; Zhang Yiwen	(China); Zhang Xuanqi; Feng Wenqiang	(Canada); Ava Kemp; Yohnatan Elizarov	

Challenger Series
Competition	Gold	Silver	Bronze	Ref.
(United States) John Nicks International Pairs Competition	(Canada); Deanna Stellato-Dudek; Maxime Deschamps	(United States); Alisa Efimova; Misha Mitrofanov	(United States); Katie McBeath; Daniil Parkman	
(Japan) Kinoshita Group Cup	(Japan); Riku Miura; Ryuichi Kihara	(Georgia (country)); Anastasiia Metelkina; Luka Berulava	(Japan); Yuna Nagaoka; Sumitada Moriguchi	
(Germany) Nebelhorn Trophy	(Germany); Minerva Fabienne Hase; Nikita Volodin	(Japan); Riku Miura; Ryuichi Kihara	(United States); Alisa Efimova; Misha Mitrofanov	
(Georgia (country)) Trialeti Trophy	(Georgia (country)); Anastasiia Metelkina; Luka Berulava	(Germany); Minerva Fabienne Hase; Nikita Volodin	(United States); Emily Chan; Spencer Akira Howe	
(Croatia) Golden Spin of Zagreb	(United States); Audrey Shin; Balázs Nagy	(United States); Valentina Plazas; Maximiliano Fernandez	(Switzerland); Oxana Vouillamoz; Tom Bouvart	

Other international competitions
Competition	Gold	Silver	Bronze	Ref.
(Philippines) Asian Open Trophy	(China); Zhang Jiaxuan; Huang Yihang	(North Korea); Ryom Tae-ok; Han Kum-chol	(Philippines); Isabella Gamez; Aleksandr Korovin	
(Italy) Lombardia Trophy	(Italy); Sara Conti; Niccolò Macii	(Italy); Rebecca Ghilardi; Filippo Ambrosini	(Czech Republic); Anna Valesi; Martin Bidař	
(China) Skate to Milano	(China); Zhang Jiaxuan; Huang Yihang	(Armenia); Karina Akopova; Nikita Rakhmanin	(Japan); Yuna Nagaoka; Sumitada Moriguchi	
(United Kingdom) Tayside Trophy	(Italy); Sara Conti; Niccolò Macii	(Czech Republic); Anna Valesi; Martin Bidař	(United States); Chelsea Liu; Ryan Bedard	
(Poland) Diamond Spin	(Iceland); Júlía Sylvía Gunnarsdóttir; Manuel Piazza	(South Africa); Julia Mauder; Johannes Wilkinson	No other competitors	
(Switzerland) Swiss Open	(Switzerland); Oxana Vouillamoz; Tom Bouvart	(Italy); Irma Caldara; Riccardo Maglio	(France); Louise Ehrhard; Matthis Pellegris	
(Austria) Ice Challenge	(United States); Chelsea Liu; Ryan Bedard	(United States); Audrey Shin; Balázs Nagy	(Canada); Ava Kemp; Yohnatan Elizarov	
(Austria) Cup of Innsbruck	(Czech Republic); Anna Valesi; Martin Bidař	(Austria); Gabriella Izzo; Luc Maierhofer	(Iceland); Júlía Sylvía Gunnarsdóttir; Manuel Piazza	
(Poland) Warsaw Cup	(Canada); Deanna Stellato-Dudek; Maxime Deschamps	(United Kingdom); Anastasia Vaipan-Law; Luke Digby	(United States); Katie McBeath; Daniil Parkman	
(Germany) Bavarian Open	(France); Megan Wessenberg; Denys Strekalin	(Austria); Sophia Schaller; Livio Mayr	No other competitors	

=== Ice dance ===
Olympics
Competition	Gold	Silver	Bronze	Ref.
(Italy) Winter Olympics	(France); Laurence Fournier Beaudry; Guillaume Cizeron	(United States); Madison Chock; Evan Bates	(Canada); Piper Gilles; Paul Poirier	

Championships
Competition	Gold	Silver	Bronze	Ref.
(United Kingdom) European Championships	(France); Laurence Fournier Beaudry; Guillaume Cizeron	(Italy); Charlène Guignard; Marco Fabbri	(United Kingdom); Lilah Fear; Lewis Gibson	
(China) Four Continents Championships	(United States); Emilea Zingas; Vadym Kolesnik	(United States); Caroline Green; Michael Parsons	(United States); Oona Brown; Gage Brown	
(Estonia) World Junior Championships	(United States); Hana Maria Aboian; Daniil Veselukhin	(France); Ambre Perrier Gianesini; Samuel Blanc Klaperman	(Ukraine); Iryna Pidgaina; Artem Koval	
(Czech Republic) World Championships	(France); Laurence Fournier Beaudry; Guillaume Cizeron	(Canada); Piper Gilles; Paul Poirier	(United States); Emilea Zingas; Vadym Kolesnik	

Grand Prix
Competition	Gold	Silver	Bronze	Ref.
Grand Prix de France	(France); Laurence Fournier Beaudry; Guillaume Cizeron	(United Kingdom); Lilah Fear; Lewis Gibson	(Lithuania); Allison Reed; Saulius Ambrulevičius	
Cup of China	(United States); Madison Chock; Evan Bates	(United States); Emilea Zingas; Vadym Kolesnik	(France); Evgeniia Lopareva; Geoffrey Brissaud	
Skate Canada International	(Canada); Piper Gilles; Paul Poirier	(Lithuania); Allison Reed; Saulius Ambrulevičius	(Canada); Marjorie Lajoie; Zachary Lagha	
(Japan) NHK Trophy	(United Kingdom); Lilah Fear; Lewis Gibson	(Italy); Charlène Guignard; Marco Fabbri	(United States); Caroline Green; Michael Parsons	
(United States) Skate America	(United States); Madison Chock; Evan Bates	(Canada); Marjorie Lajoie; Zachary Lagha	(France); Evgeniia Lopareva; Geoffrey Brissaud	
(Finland) Finlandia Trophy	(France); Laurence Fournier Beaudry; Guillaume Cizeron	(Canada); Piper Gilles; Paul Poirier	(United States); Emilea Zingas; Vadym Kolesnik	
(Japan) Grand Prix Final	(United States); Madison Chock; Evan Bates	(France); Laurence Fournier Beaudry; Guillaume Cizeron	(United Kingdom); Lilah Fear; Lewis Gibson	

Junior Grand Prix
Competition	Gold	Silver	Bronze	Ref.
JGP Latvia	(Canada); Layla Veillon; Alexander Brandys	(France); Dania Mouaden; Theo Bigot	(United States); Jasmine Robertson; Chase Rohner	
JGP Turkey	(Ukraine); Iryna Pidgaina; Artem Koval	(Canada); Charlie Anderson; Cayden Dawson	(France); Lea Hienne; Louis Varescon	
JGP Italy	(United States); Jasmine Robertson; Chase Rohner	(France); Ambre Perrier Gianesini; Samuel Blanc Klaperman	(Canada); Summer Homick; Nicholas Buelow	
JGP Thailand	(United States); Hana Maria Aboian; Daniil Veselukhin	(Canada); Charlie Anderson; Cayden Dawson	(France); Lea Hienne; Louis Varescon	
JGP Azerbaijan	(France); Ambre Perrier Gianesini; Samuel Blanc Klaperman	(Italy); Zoe Bianchi; Daniel Basile	(Canada); Summer Homick; Nicholas Buelow	
JGP Poland	(Ukraine); Iryna Pidgaina; Artem Koval	(Canada); Layla Veillon; Alexander Brandys	(Italy); Larianna Soldati; Nicholas Tagliabue	
JGP United Arab Emirates	(United States); Hana Maria Aboian; Daniil Veselukhin	(France); Dania Mouaden; Theo Bigot	(Italy); Zoe Bianchi; Daniel Basile	
(Japan) Junior Grand Prix Final	(United States); Hana Maria Aboian; Daniil Veselukhin	(France); Ambre Perrier Gianesini; Samuel Blanc Klaperman	(Ukraine); Iryna Pidgaina; Artem Koval	

Challenger Series
Competition	Gold	Silver	Bronze	Ref.
(Japan) Kinoshita Group Cup	(Canada); Marie-Jade Lauriault; Romain le Gac	(United States); Emilea Zingas; Vadym Kolesnik	(United States); Leah Neset; Artem Markelov	
(Italy) Lombardia Trophy	(United States); Eva Pate; Logan Bye	(Czech Republic); Kateřina Mrázková; Daniel Mrázek	(United States); Katarina Wolfkostin; Dimitry Tsarevski	
(Germany) Nebelhorn Trophy	(United Kingdom); Lilah Fear; Lewis Gibson	(United States); Christina Carreira; Anthony Ponomarenko	(Canada); Marie-Jade Lauriault; Romain Le Gac	
(Slovakia) Nepela Memorial	(Spain); Olivia Smart; Tim Dieck	(Czech Republic); Natálie Taschlerová; Filip Taschler	(United States); Caroline Green; Michael Parsons	
(Kazakhstan) Denis Ten Memorial Challenge	(Georgia (country)); Diana Davis; Gleb Smolkin	(United States); Oona Brown; Gage Brown	(Sweden); Milla Ruud Reitan; Nikolaj Majorov	
(Georgia (country)) Trialeti Trophy	(Georgia (country)); Diana Davis; Gleb Smolkin	(Australia); Holly Harris; Jason Chan	(France); Loïcia Demougeot; Théo le Mercier	
(Poland) Warsaw Cup	(France); Evgeniia Lopareva; Geoffrey Brissaud	(South Korea); Hannah Lim; Ye Quan	(United States); Caroline Green; Michael Parsons	
(Estonia) Tallinn Trophy	(Spain); Olivia Smart; Tim Dieck	(Germany); Jennifer Janse van Rensburg; Benjamin Steffan	(Czech Republic); Natálie Taschlerová; Filip Taschler	
(Croatia) Golden Spin of Zagreb	(Italy); Charlène Guignard; Marco Fabbri	(France); Loïcia Demougeot; Théo le Mercier	(Czech Republic); Kateřina Mrázková; Daniel Mrázek	

Other international competitions
Competition	Gold	Silver	Bronze	Ref.
(United States) Lake Placid Ice Dance International	(United States); Oona Brown; Gage Brown	(Canada); Marie-Jade Lauriault; Romain Le Gac	(South Korea); Hannah Lim; Ye Quan	
(Netherlands) International ICE Dance Dordrecht	(Spain); Sofía Val; Asaf Kazimov	(Republic of Ireland); Carolane Soucisse; Shane Firus	(Italy); Victoria Manni; Carlo Röthlisberger	
(United Kingdom) Bolero Cup	(United Kingdom); Lilah Fear; Lewis Gibson	(Lithuania); Allison Reed; Saulius Ambrulevičius	(Australia); Holly Harris; Jason Chan	
(China) Skate to Milano	(Lithuania); Allison Reed; Saulius Ambrulevičius	(Australia); Holly Harris; Jason Chan	(Spain); Sofía Val; Asaf Kazimov	
(France) Trophée Métropole Nice Côte d'Azur	(Czech Republic); Natálie Taschlerová; Filip Taschler	(United Kingdom); Phebe Bekker; James Hernandez	(Italy); Carlotta Argentieri; Francesco Riva	
(Hungary) Budapest Trophy	(Canada); Marjorie Lajoie; Zachary Lagha	(Hungary); Mariia Ignateva; Danijil Szemko	(Italy); Giulia Isabella Paolino; Andrea Tuba	
(Italy) Mezzaluna Cup	(Finland); Yuka Orihara; Juho Pirinen	(Italy); Giulia Isabella Paolino; Andrea Tuba	(United States); Amy Cui; Jonathan Rogers	
(Switzerland) Swiss Open	(France); Marie Dupayage; Thomas Nabais	(Italy); Victoria Manni; Carlo Röthlisberger	(Switzerland); Arianna Sassi; Luca Morini	
(Bulgaria) Denkova-Staviski Cup	(Italy); Victoria Manni; Carlo Röthlisberger	(Ukraine); Zoe Larson; Andrii Kapran	(China); Ren Junfei; Xing Jianing	
(Austria) Ice Challenge	(United States); Eva Pate; Logan Bye	(Canada); Jamie Fournier; Everest Zhu	(Italy); Leia Dozzi; Pietro Papetti	
(Germany) NRW Trophy	(Germany); Charise Matthaei; Max Liebers	(Italy); Giulia Isabella Paolino; Andrea Tuba	(Hungary); Mariia Ignateva; Danijil Szemko	
(Czech Republic) Pavel Roman Memorial	(France); Marie Dupayage; Thomas Nabais	No other competitors		
(Turkey) Bosphorus Cup	(Cyprus); Angelina Kudryavtseva; Ilia Karankevich	(Ukraine); Mariia Pinchuk; Mykyta Pogorielov	(Georgia (country)); Maria Kazakova; Vladislav Kasinskij	
(Hungary) Santa Claus Cup	(United States); Emily Bratti; Ian Somerville	(Hungary); Mariia Ignateva; Danijil Szemko	(United States); Elliana Peal; Ethan Peal	
(Bulgaria) Sofia Trophy	(Spain); Sofía Val; Asaf Kazimov	(Ukraine); Mariia Pinchuk; Mykyta Pogorielov	(Azerbaijan); Samantha Ritter; Daniel Brykalov	
(Netherlands) International Challenge Cup	(France); Loïcia Demougeot; Théo le Mercier	(France); Marie Dupayage; Thomas Nabais	(France); Célina Fradji; Jean-Hans Fourneaux	
(Germany) Bavarian Open	(Sweden); Milla Ruud Reitan; Nikolaj Majorov	(United States); Elliana Peal; Ethan Peal	(Italy); Giulia Isabella Paolino; Andrea Tuba	
(Poland) EDGE Cup	(France); Natacha Lagouge; Arnaud Caffa	(Ukraine); Zoe Larson; Andrii Kapran	(Georgia (country)); Maria Kazakova; Vladislav Kasinskij	
(Germany) Skate Berlin	(Germany); Charise Matthaei; Max Liebers	(Israel); Shira Ichilov; Mikhail Nosovitskiy	(Italy); Giulia Isabella Paolino; Andrea Tuba	
(Poland) Maria Olszewska Memorial	(Switzerland); Gina Zehnder; Beda Leon Sieber	(Poland); Sofiia Dovhal; Wiktor Kulesza	(Poland); Olexandra Borysova; Aaron Freeman	

== Records and achievements ==
=== Records ===
Prior to the 2025–26 season, the ISU record scores were as follows:

Records prior to the 2025–26 season
Level	Segment	Discipline											
Level	Segment	Men's singles			Women's singles			Pairs			Ice dance		
Level	Segment	Skater	Score	Event	Skater	Score	Event	Team	Score	Event	Team	Score	Event
Senior	SP / RD	(United States); Nathan Chen	113.97	2022 Winter Olympics	(Russia); Kamila Valieva	87.42	2021 Rostelecom Cup	(China); Sui Wenjing; Han Cong	84.41	2022 Winter Olympics	(United States); Madison Chock; Evan Bates	93.91	2023 World Team Trophy
Senior	FS / FD	(United States); Ilia Malinin	227.79	2024 World Championships	(Russia); Kamila Valieva	185.29	2021 Rostelecom Cup	(Russia); Anastasia Mishina; Aleksandr Galliamov	157.46	2022 European Championships	(United States); Madison Chock; Evan Bates	138.41	2023 World Team Trophy
Senior	Combined total	(United States); Nathan Chen	335.30	2019–20 Grand Prix Final	(Russia); Kamila Valieva	272.71	2021 Rostelecom Cup	(China); Sui Wenjing; Han Cong	239.88	2022 Winter Olympics	(United States); Madison Chock; Evan Bates	232.32	2023 World Team Trophy
Junior	SP / RD	(United States); Ilia Malinin	88.99	2022 World Junior Championships	(Russia); Alena Kostornaia	76.32	2018–19 Junior Grand Prix Final	(Russia); Apollinariia Panfilova; Dmitry Rylov	73.71	2020 World Junior Championships	(United States); Leah Neset; Artem Markelov	72.48	2023–24 Junior Grand Prix Final
Junior	FS / FD	(United States); Ilia Malinin	187.12	2022 World Junior Championships	(Russia); Sofia Akateva	157.19	2021 JGP Russia	(Georgia (country)); Anastasiia Metelkina; Luka Berulava	131.63	2023–24 Junior Grand Prix Final	(United States); Avonley Nguyen; Vadym Kolesnik	108.91	2020 World Junior Championships
Junior	Combined total	(United States); Ilia Malinin	276.11	2022 World Junior Championships	(Russia); Sofia Akateva	233.08	2021 JGP Russia	(Georgia (country)); Anastasiia Metelkina; Luka Berulava	202.11	2023–24 Junior Grand Prix Final	(Italy); Noemi Maria Tali; Noah Lafornara	177.50	2025 World Junior Championships

The following new ISU best scores were set during this season:

New records set during the 2025–26 season
Disc.	Segment	Skater(s)	Score	Event	Date	Ref.
Men	Free skating	(United States); Ilia Malinin	228.97	2025 Skate Canada International	November 2, 2025	
Men	Free skating	(United States); Ilia Malinin	238.24	2025–26 Grand Prix Final	December 6, 2025	
Pairs	Free skating	(Japan); Riku Miura; Ryuichi Kihara	158.13	2026 Winter Olympics	February 16, 2026	
Junior men	Short program	(Japan); Rio Nakata	89.51	2026 World Junior Championships	March 4, 2026	

== Season's best scores ==
=== Men's singles ===
As of March 28, 2026.

Top 10 season's best scores in the men's combined total
No.	Skater	Nation	Score	Event
1	Ilia Malinin	United States	333.81	2025 Skate Canada International
2	Yuma Kagiyama	Japan	306.67	2026 World Championships
3	Shun Sato	Japan	292.08	2025–26 Grand Prix Final
4	Mikhail Shaidorov	Kazakhstan	291.58	2026 Winter Olympics
5	Daniel Grassl	Italy	288.72	2025–26 Grand Prix Final
6	Stephen Gogolev	Canada	281.04	2026 World Championships
7	Adam Siao Him Fa	France	280.95	2025 Grand Prix de France
8	Cha Jun-hwan	South Korea	273.92	2026 Winter Olympics
9	Kao Miura	Japan	273.73	2026 Four Continents Championships
10	Nika Egadze	Georgia	273.00	2026 European Championships

Top 10 season's best scores in the men's short program
No.	Skater	Nation	Score	Event
1	Ilia Malinin	United States	111.29	2026 World Championships
2	Yuma Kagiyama	Japan	108.77	2025–26 Grand Prix Final
3	Adam Siao Him Fa	France	102.55	2026 Winter Olympics
4	Kao Miura	Japan	98.59	2026 Four Continents Championships
5	Shun Sato	Japan	98.06	2025–26 Grand Prix Final
6	Kazuki Tomono	Japan	97.19	2026 Four Continents Championships
7	Aleksandr Selevko	Estonia	96.49	2026 World Championships
8	Nika Egadze	Georgia	95.67	2025 Grand Prix de France
9	Mikhail Shaidorov	Kazakhstan	95.01	2025 CS Denis Ten Memorial
10	Sōta Yamamoto	Japan	94.68	2026 Four Continents Championships

Top 10 season's best scores in the men's free skating
No.	Skater	Nation	Score	Event
1	Ilia Malinin	United States	238.24	2025–26 Grand Prix Final
2	Yuma Kagiyama	Japan	212.87	2026 World Championships
3	Mikhail Shaidorov	Kazakhstan	198.64	2026 Winter Olympics
4	Adam Siao Him Fa	France	196.08	2025 Grand Prix de France
5	Shun Sato	Japan	194.86	2026 Winter Olympics (team)
6	Daniel Grassl	Italy	194.72	2025–26 Grand Prix Final
7	Stephen Gogolev	Canada	186.66	2026 World Championships
8	Cha Jun-hwan	South Korea	184.73	2026 Four Continents
9	Petr Gumennik	Individual Neutral Athletes	184.49	2026 Winter Olympics
10	Kévin Aymoz	France	184.39	2026 World Championships

=== Women's singles ===
As of March 27, 2026.

Top 10 season's best scores in the women's combined total
No.	Skater	Nation	Score	Event
1	Kaori Sakamoto	Japan	238.28	2026 World Championships
2	Mone Chiba	Japan	228.47	2026 World Championships
3	Ami Nakai	Japan	227.08	2025 Grand Prix de France
4	Alysa Liu	United States	226.79	2026 Winter Olympics
5	Mao Shimada	Japan	218.13	2025–26 Junior Grand Prix Final
6	Yuna Aoki	Japan	217.39	2026 Four Continents Championships
7	Niina Petrõkina	Estonia	216.14	2026 European Championships
8	Rion Sumiyoshi	Japan	216.06	2025 Grand Prix de France
9	Nina Pinzarrone	Belgium	215.20	2026 World Championships
10	Amber Glenn	United States	214.91	2026 Winter Olympics

Top 10 season's best scores in the women's short program
No.	Skater	Nation	Score	Event
1	Kaori Sakamoto	Japan	79.31	2026 World Championships
2	Ami Nakai	Japan	78.71	2026 Winter Olympics
3	Mone Chiba	Japan	78.45	2026 World Championships
4	Alysa Liu	United States	76.59	2026 Winter Olympics
5	Amber Glenn	United States	75.72	2025 Finlandia Trophy
6	Shin Ji-a	South Korea	74.47	2025 CS Nebelhorn Trophy
7	Rinka Watanabe	Japan	74.35	2025 Skate America
8	Mao Shimada	Japan	73.45	2025–26 Junior Grand Prix Final
9	Isabeau Levito	United States	73.37	2025 Grand Prix de France
10	Adeliia Petrosian	Individual Neutral Athletes	72.89	2026 Winter Olympics

Top 10 season's best scores in the women's free skating
No.	Skater	Nation	Score	Event
1	Kaori Sakamoto	Japan	158.97	2026 World Championships
2	Alysa Liu	United States	150.20	2026 Winter Olympics
3	Mone Chiba	Japan	150.02	2026 World Championships
4	Ami Nakai	Japan	149.08	2025 Grand Prix de France
5	Amber Glenn	United States	147.52	2026 Winter Olympics
6	Yuna Aoki	Japan	145.98	2026 Four Continents Championships
7	Niina Petrõkina	Estonia	145.53	2026 European Championships
8	Rion Sumiyoshi	Japan	145.03	2025 Grand Prix de France
9	Mao Shimada	Japan	144.68	2025–26 Junior Grand Prix Final
10	Nina Pinzarrone	Belgium	143.38	2026 World Championships

=== Pairs ===
As of March 26, 2026.

Top 10 season's best scores in the pairs' combined total
No.	Team	Nation	Score	Event
1	Riku Miura; Ryuichi Kihara	Japan	231.24	2026 Winter Olympics
2	Minerva Fabienne Hase; Nikita Volodin	Germany	228.33	2026 World Championships
3	Anastasiia Metelkina; Luka Berulava	Georgia	225.20	2025 CS Trialeti Trophy
4	Sara Conti; Niccolò Macii	Italy	223.28	2025–26 Grand Prix Final
5	Lia Pereira; Trennt Michaud	Canada	216.09	2026 World Championships
6	Maria Pavlova; Alexei Sviatchenko	Hungary	215.26	2026 Winter Olympics
7	Deanna Stellato-Dudek; Maxime Deschamps	Canada	213.40	2025 Skate Canada International
8	Yuna Nagaoka; Sumitada Moriguchi	Japan	209.13	2026 World Championships
9	Sui Wenjing; Han Cong	China	208.64	2026 Winter Olympics
10	Alisa Efimova; Misha Mitrofanov	United States	205.49	2025 Finlandia Trophy

Top 10 season's best scores in the pairs' short program
No.	Team	Nation	Score	Event
1	Riku Miura; Ryuichi Kihara	Japan	82.84	2026 Winter Olympics (team)
2	Minerva Fabienne Hase; Nikita Volodin	Germany	80.01	2026 Winter Olympics
3	Anastasiia Metelkina; Luka Berulava	Georgia	79.45	2026 World Championships
4	Sara Conti; Niccolò Macii	Italy	77.22	2025–26 Grand Prix Final
5	Sui Wenjing; Han Cong	China	76.02	2026 Four Continents Championships
6	Lia Pereira; Trennt Michaud	Canada	75.52	2026 World Championships
7	Deanna Stellato-Dudek; Maxime Deschamps	Canada	74.26	2025 Grand Prix de France
8	Maria Pavlova; Alexei Sviatchenko	Hungary	73.87	2026 Winter Olympics
9	Yuna Nagaoka; Sumitada Moriguchi	Japan	71.95	2026 Four Continents Championships
10	Ellie Kam; Daniel O'Shea	United States	71.87	2026 Winter Olympics

Top 10 season's best scores in the pairs' free skating
No.	Team	Nation	Score	Event
1	Riku Miura; Ryuichi Kihara	Japan	158.13	2026 Winter Olympics
2	Minerva Fabienne Hase; Nikita Volodin	Germany	149.57	2025–26 Grand Prix Final
3	Anastasiia Metelkina; Luka Berulava	Georgia	148.07	2025 CS Trialeti Trophy
4	Sara Conti; Niccolò Macii	Italy	146.06	2025–26 Grand Prix Final
5	Maria Pavlova; Alexei Sviatchenko	Hungary	141.39	2026 Winter Olympics
6	Lia Pereira; Trennt Michaud	Canada	140.57	2026 World Championships
7	Deanna Stellato-Dudek; Maxime Deschamps	Canada	140.37	2025 Skate Canada International
8	Yuna Nagaoka; Sumitada Moriguchi	Japan	139.48	2026 World Championships
9	Sui Wenjing; Han Cong	China	135.98	2026 Winter Olympics
10	Ellie Kam; Daniel O'Shea	United States	135.36	2026 Winter Olympics (team)

=== Ice dance ===
As of March 28, 2026.

Top 10 season's best scores in the ice dance combined total
No.	Team	Nation	Score	Event
1	Laurence Fournier Beaudry; Guillaume Cizeron	France	230.81	2026 World Championships
2	Madison Chock; Evan Bates	United States	224.39	2026 Winter Olympics
3	Piper Gilles; Paul Poirier	Canada	217.74	2026 Winter Olympics
4	Charlène Guignard; Marco Fabbri	Italy	210.34	2026 European Championships
5	Lilah Fear; Lewis Gibson	Great Britain	210.24	2025 Grand Prix de France
6	Emilea Zingas; Vadym Kolesnik	United States	209.20	2026 World Championships
7	Olivia Smart; Tim Dieck	Spain	206.37	2026 World Championships
8	Evgeniia Lopareva; Geoffrey Brissaud	France	204.72	2026 European Championships
9	Allison Reed; Saulius Ambrulevičius	Lithuania	204.66	2026 Winter Olympics
10	Diana Davis; Gleb Smolkin	Georgia	203.39	2025 CS Trialeti Trophy

Top 10 season's best scores in the rhythm dance
No.	Team	Nation	Score	Event
1	Laurence Fournier Beaudry; Guillaume Cizeron	France	92.74	2026 World Championships
2	Madison Chock; Evan Bates	United States	91.06	2026 Winter Olympics (team)
3	Lilah Fear; Lewis Gibson	Great Britain	86.85	2026 Winter Olympics (team)
4	Piper Gilles; Paul Poirier	Canada	86.45	2026 World Championships
5	Charlène Guignard; Marco Fabbri	Italy	84.48	2026 European Championships
6	Emilea Zingas; Vadym Kolesnik	United States	84.21	2026 World Championships
7	Allison Reed; Saulius Ambrulevičius	Lithuania	83.08	2026 European Championships
8	Evgeniia Lopareva; Geoffrey Brissaud	France	83.07	2026 World Championships
9	Olivia Smart; Tim Dieck	Spain	81.06	2026 World Championships
10	Christina Carreira; Anthony Ponomarenko	United States	80.89	2026 World Championships

Top 10 season's best scores in the free dance
No.	Team	Nation	Score	Event
1	Laurence Fournier Beaudry; Guillaume Cizeron	France	138.07	2026 World Championships
2	Madison Chock; Evan Bates	United States	134.67	2026 Winter Olympics
3	Piper Gilles; Paul Poirier	Canada	131.56	2026 Winter Olympics
4	Lilah Fear; Lewis Gibson	Great Britain	126.26	2025–26 Grand Prix Final
5	Charlène Guignard; Marco Fabbri	Italy	125.86	2026 European Championships
6	Olivia Smart; Tim Dieck	Spain	125.31	2026 World Championships
7	Emilea Zingas; Vadym Kolesnik	United States	124.99	2026 World Championships
8	Diana Davis; Gleb Smolkin	Georgia	123.04	2025 CS Trialeti Trophy
9	Evgeniia Lopareva; Geoffrey Brissaud	France	122.34	2026 European Championships
10	Allison Reed; Saulius Ambrulevičius	Lithuania	121.71	2026 Winter Olympics

== World standings ==
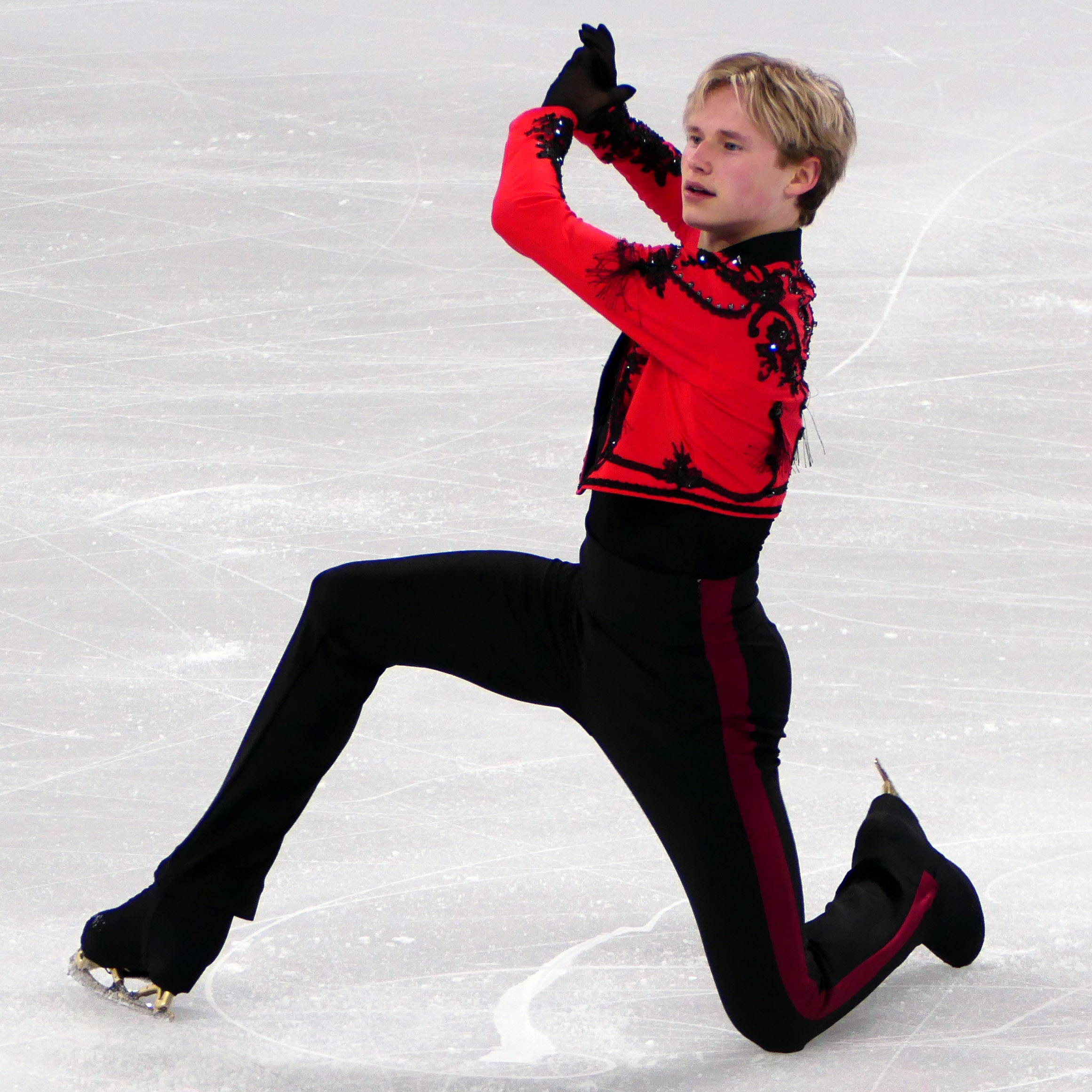
Ilia Malinin of the United States was the highest ranked men's singles skater at the beginning of the 2025–26 season.

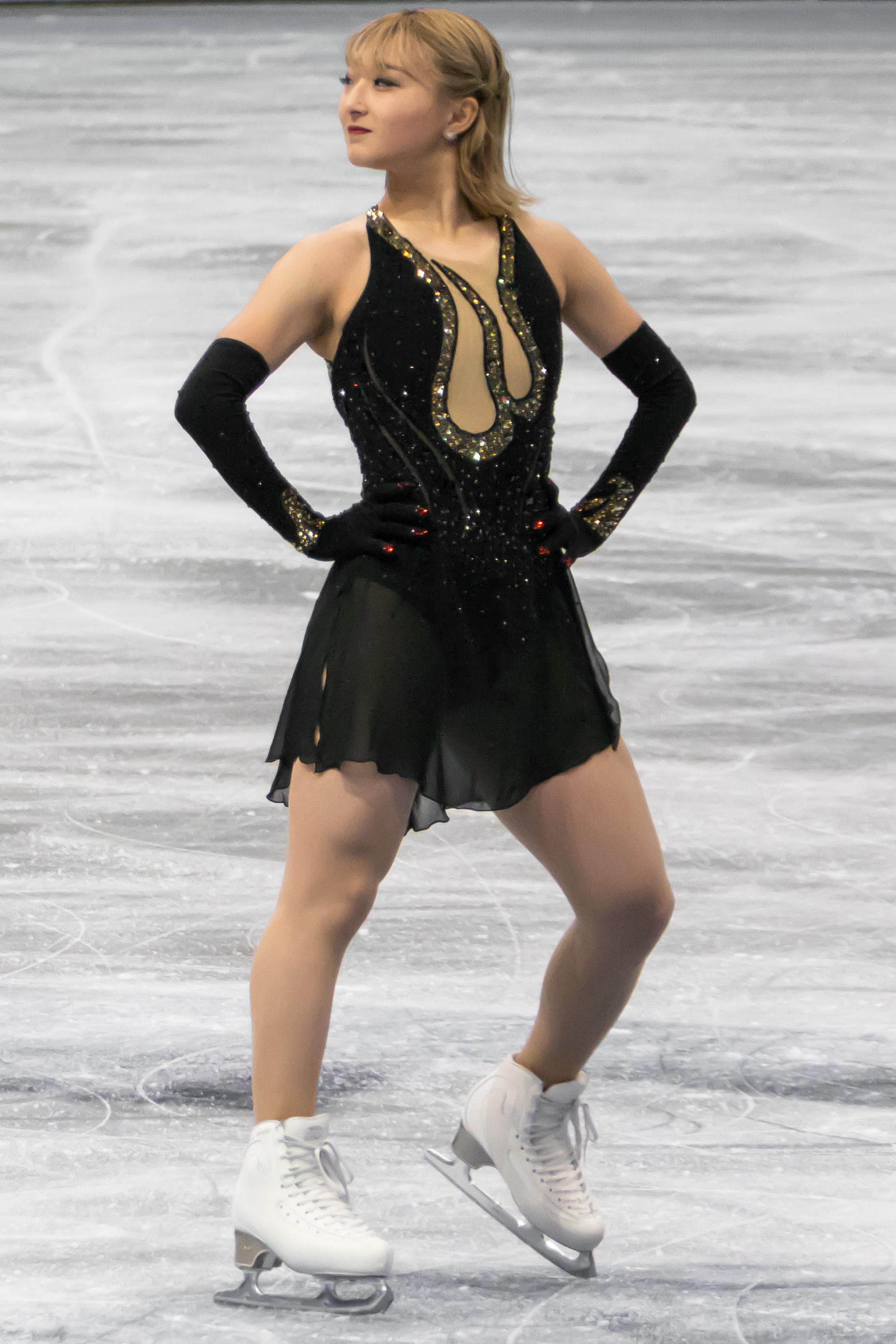
Kaori Sakamoto of Japan was the highest ranked women's singles skater at the beginning of the 2025–26 season.

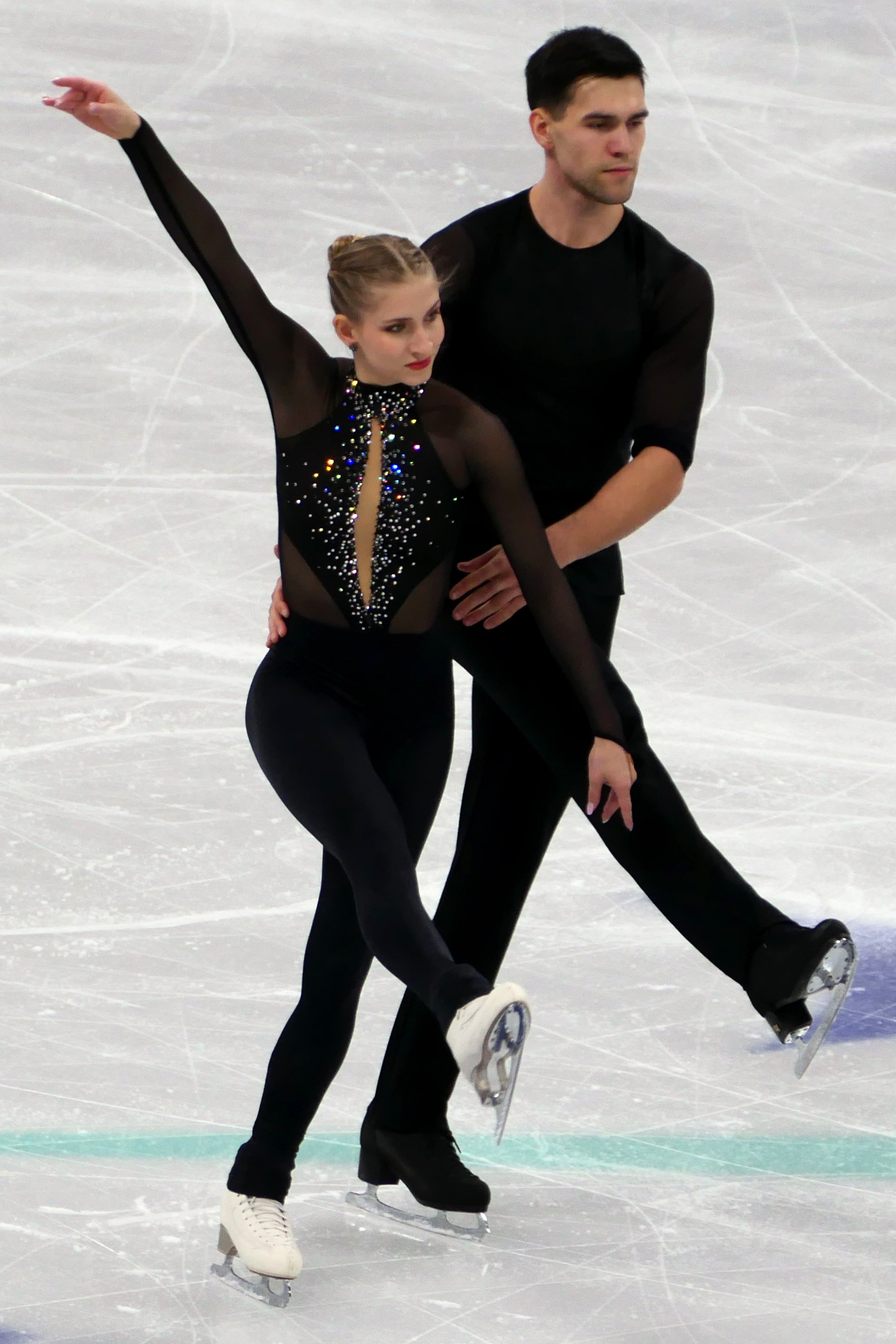
Minerva Fabienne Hase and Nikita Volodin of Germany were the highest ranked pair skaters at the beginning of the 2025–26 season.

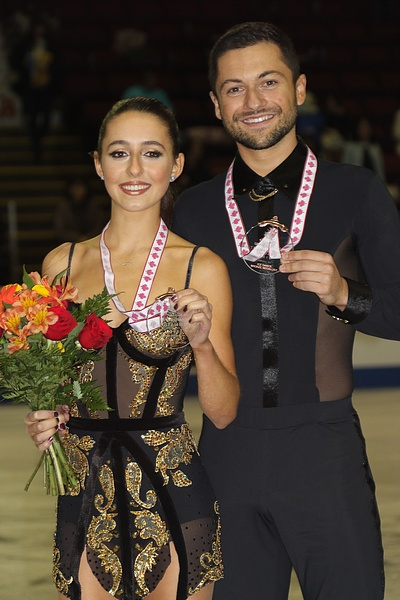
Lilah Fear and Lewis Gibson of Great Britain were the highest ranked ice dancers at the beginning of the 2025–26 season.

=== Men's singles ===
As of March 28, 2026.

No.	Skater	Nation
1	Ilia Malinin	United States
2	Yuma Kagiyama	Japan
3	Mikhail Shaidorov	Kazakhstan
4	Shun Sato	Japan
5	Adam Siao Him Fa	France
6	Kévin Aymoz	France
7	Nika Egadze	Georgia
8	Daniel Grassl	Italy
9	Lukas Britschgi	Switzerland
10	Kao Miura	Japan

=== Women's singles ===
As of March 27, 2026.

No.	Skater	Nation
1	Kaori Sakamoto	Japan
2	Mone Chiba	Japan
3	Alysa Liu	United States
4	Amber Glenn	United States
5	Isabeau Levito	United States
6	Nina Pinzarrone	Belgium
7	Bradie Tennell	United States
8	Lara Naki Gutmann	Italy
9	Anastasiia Gubanova	Georgia
10	Kim Chae-yeon	South Korea

=== Pairs ===
As of March 26, 2026.

No.	Team	Nation
1	Minerva Fabienne Hase; Nikita Volodin	Germany
2	Riku Miura; Ryuichi Kihara	Japan
3	Anastasiia Metelkina; Luka Berulava	Georgia
4	Sara Conti; Niccolò Macii	Italy
5	Deanna Stellato-Dudek; Maxime Deschamps	Canada
6	Alisa Efimova; Misha Mitrofanov	United States
7	Maria Pavlova; Alexei Sviatchenko	Hungary
8	Ellie Kam; Daniel O'Shea	United States
9	Rebecca Ghilardi; Filippo Ambrosini	Italy
10	Lia Pereira; Trennt Michaud	Canada

=== Ice dance ===
As of March 28, 2026.

No.	Team	Nation
1	Lilah Fear; Lewis Gibson	Great Britain
2	Madison Chock; Evan Bates	United States
3	Charlène Guignard; Marco Fabbri	Italy
4	Piper Gilles; Paul Poirier	Canada
5	Evgenia Lopareva; Geoffrey Brissaud	France
6	Emilea Zingas; Vadym Kolesnik	United States
7	Olivia Smart; Tim Dieck	Spain
8	Allison Reed; Saulius Ambrulevičius	Lithuania
9	Christina Carreira; Anthony Ponomarenko	United States
10	Caroline Green; Michael Parsons	United States
