= Alina Bonillo =

American figure skater

- Bonillo at the 2026 U.S. Championships

Personal information
- Born: March 16, 2007 (age 19) Chicago, Illinois, U.S.
- Height: 5 ft 1 in (1.55 m)

Figure skating career
- Country: United States
- Discipline: Women's singles
- Coach: Benoit Richaud; Jeremy Allen
- Skating club: DuPage FSC
- Began skating: 2010

Alina Bonillo (born March 16, 2007) is an American figure skater. She is the 2026 Bavarian Open champion, the 2025 Tayside Trophy Champion, and the 2025 Tallinn Trophy bronze medalist.

== Personal life ==
Alina Bonillo was born on March 16, 2007, in Chicago, Illinois. She is the daughter of Larissa Zamotina, a Russian former competitive figure skater who competed for the Soviet Union.

== Career ==
=== Early career ===
Bonillo made her first junior international appearance at the 2024 Cranberry Cup, where she finished in 14th place. Bonillo won the bronze medal at the 2024 Midwestern Sectional Figure Skating Championships, and later placed thirteenth at the 2024 U.S. Junior Championships.

=== 2025–2026 season: Senior international debut ===
Bonillo opened her season by winning the gold medal at the 2025 Tayside Trophy. She later won the bronze medal at the 2026 Tallinn Trophy. She was twelfth at the 2026 U.S. Championships. Bonillo concluded her season by winning gold at the Bavarian Open.

=== 2026-27 season: Grand Prix Debut ===
Bonillo began the season by placing 12th at the 2026 Budapest Trophy. She finished 12th overall at the 2026 Cup of China.

== Programs ==
Competition programs by season
Season	Short program	Free skate program
2024-25	"Lacrymosa": Performed by Evanescence	Medley: 1. "Houdini’s Dream"; 2. "Lotus Flower"; Composed by Balázs Havasi
2025-26	Medley: 1. "I Need a Hero"; 2. "Woman Down"; Performed by Beth Hart; Choreo. by Benoît Richaud	"The Secret History": Composed by Kerry Muzzey; Choreo. by Benoît Richaud
2026-27	Medley: 1. "Savage Daughter"; Performed by Ekaterina Shelehova; 2. "Makeba"; Performed by Jain; Choreo. by Leonid Sviridenko	"The Secret History"

== Competitive highlights ==
Competition placements at senior level
Season	2024–25	2025–26	2026–27
U.S. Championships	15th	12th	
GP Cup of China			12th
CS Budapest Trophy			12th
CS Tallinn Trophy		3rd	
Bavarian Open		1st	
Maria Olszewska Memorial	6th		
Tayside Trophy		1st	

Competition placements at junior level
Season	2023–24	2024–25
U.S. Championships	13th	
Cranberry Cup		14th

== Detailed results ==
ISU personal best scores in the +5/-5 GOE System
Segment	Type	Score	Event
Total	TSS	183.59	2025 Tallinn Trophy
Short program	TSS	61.10	2025 Tallinn Trophy
Short program	TES	32.31	2025 Tallinn Trophy
Short program	PCS	28.79	2025 Tallinn Trophy
Free skating	TSS	122.49	2025 Tallinn Trophy
Free skating	TES	64.28	2025 Tallinn Trophy
Free skating	PCS	58.21	2025 Tallinn Trophy

=== Senior level ===
Results in the 2024–25 season
Date	Event	SP		FS		Total	
Date	Event	P	Score	P	Score	P	Score
Jan 20–26, 2025	(United States) 2025 U.S. Championships	13	56.42	16	87.86	15	144.28
Mar 4–9, 2025	(Poland) 2025 Maria Olszewska Memorial	7	51.56	6	98.91	6	150.47

Results in the 2025–26 season
Date	Event	SP		FS		Total	
Date	Event	P	Score	P	Score	P	Score
Oct 11–12, 2025	(United Kingdom) 2025 Tayside Trophy	1	60.23	1	117.64	1	177.87
Nov 25–30, 2025	(Estonia) 2025 CS Tallinn Trophy	4	61.10	2	122.49	3	183.59
Jan 4–11, 2026	(United States) 2026 U.S. Championships	11	58.94	14	101.05	12	159.99
Jan 27 – Feb 1, 2026	(Germany) 2026 Bavarian Open	2	51.00	1	100.67	1	151.67

Results in the 2026–27 season
Date	Event	SP		FS		Total	
Date	Event	P	Score	P	Score	P	Score
Oct 16–18, 2026	(Hungary) 2026 CS Budapest Trophy	10	57.94	15	101.85	12	159.79
Nov 6–8, 2026	2026 Cup of China	10	59.30	12	91.02	12	150.32

=== Junior level ===
Results in the 2023–24 season
Date	Event	SP		FS		Total	
Date	Event	P	Score	P	Score	P	Score
Jan 22–28, 2024	(United States) 2024 U.S. Championships (Junior)	10	52.66	14	84.86	13	137.52

Results in the 2024–25 season
Date	Event	SP		FS		Total	
Date	Event	P	Score	P	Score	P	Score
Aug 8–11, 2024	(United States) 2024 Cranberry Cup International	16	38.46	13	80.57	14	119.03
