= Benoît Richaud =

French figure skater (born 1988)

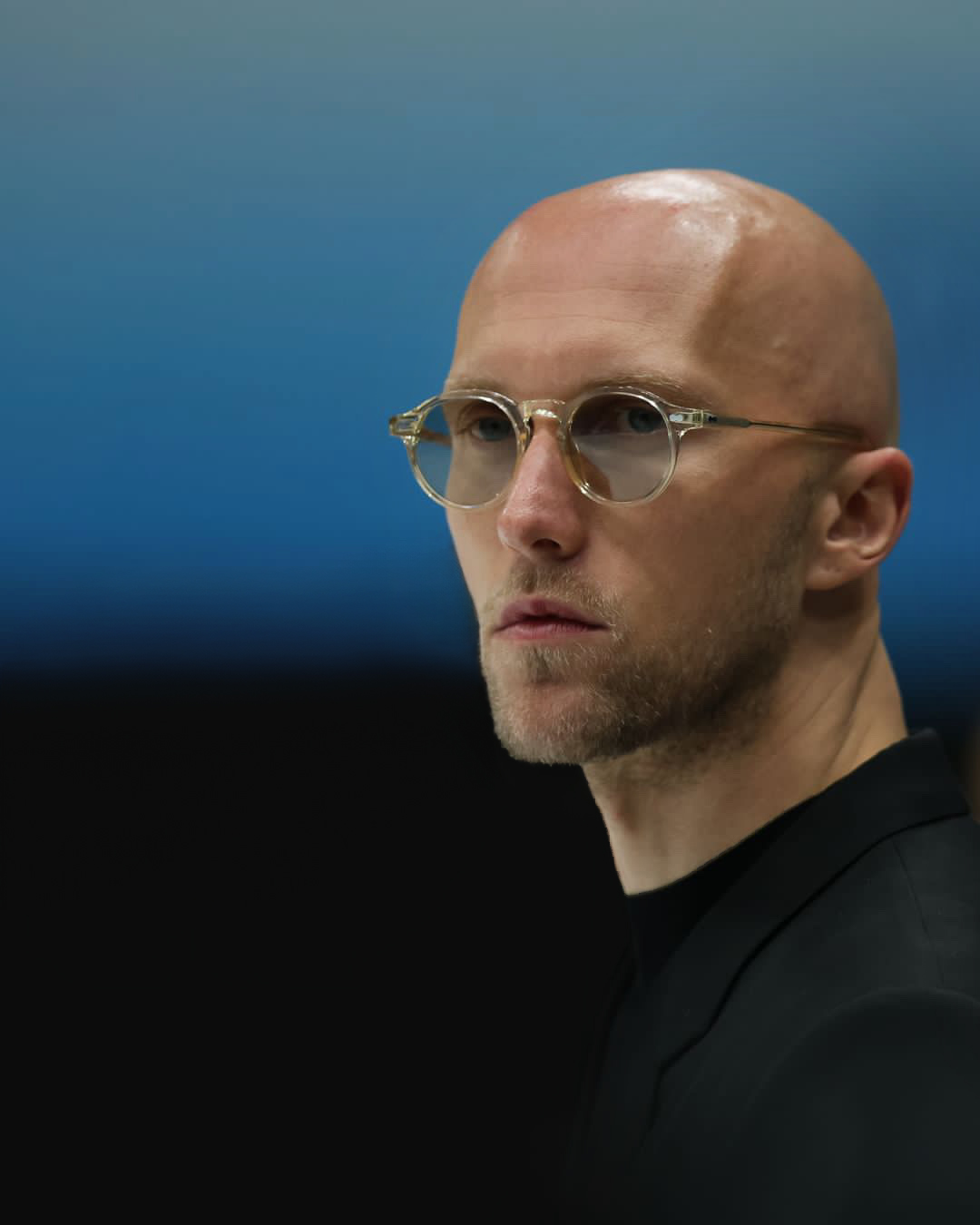
- Richaud in 2024

Personal information
- Born: 16 January 1988 (age 38) Avignon, France
- Home town: Avignon, France
- Height: 1.83 m (6 ft 0 in)

Figure skating career
- Country: France
- Discipline: Ice dance
- Skating club: CSG Lyon
Medal record
French Championships
Bronze medal – third place	2009 Colmar	Ice dance

Benoît Richaud (born 16 January 1988) is a French figure skating coach, choreographer and former competitive ice dancer. He has competed at three World Junior Championships, placing as high as seventh.

== Competitive career ==
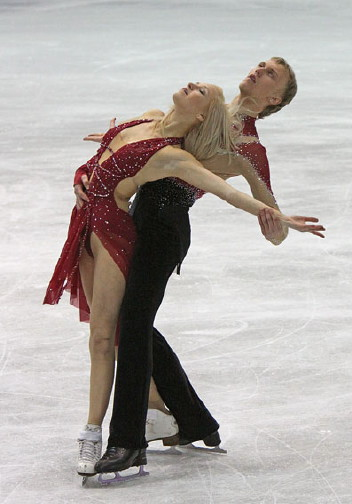
Findlay/Richaud at the 2009 World Junior Championships

Richaud was a former student of Boucher-Zazoui (a school in Lyon). He competed for France throughout his career. His first ice dancing partner was Scarlett Rouzet.

From 2005 to 2007, he skated with Élodie Brouiller. They competed at two World Junior Championships, placing 13th in 2006 and 7th in 2007. Brouiller/Richaud won two medals on the ISU Junior Grand Prix series and qualified for the JGP Final in 2006. They ended their partnership in 2007.

Subsequently, Richaud partnered with Canada's Terra Findlay in November 2007. During the 2008–2009 season, they placed 10th at the World Junior Championships. Their partnership concluded at the end of the season.

== Post-competitive career ==
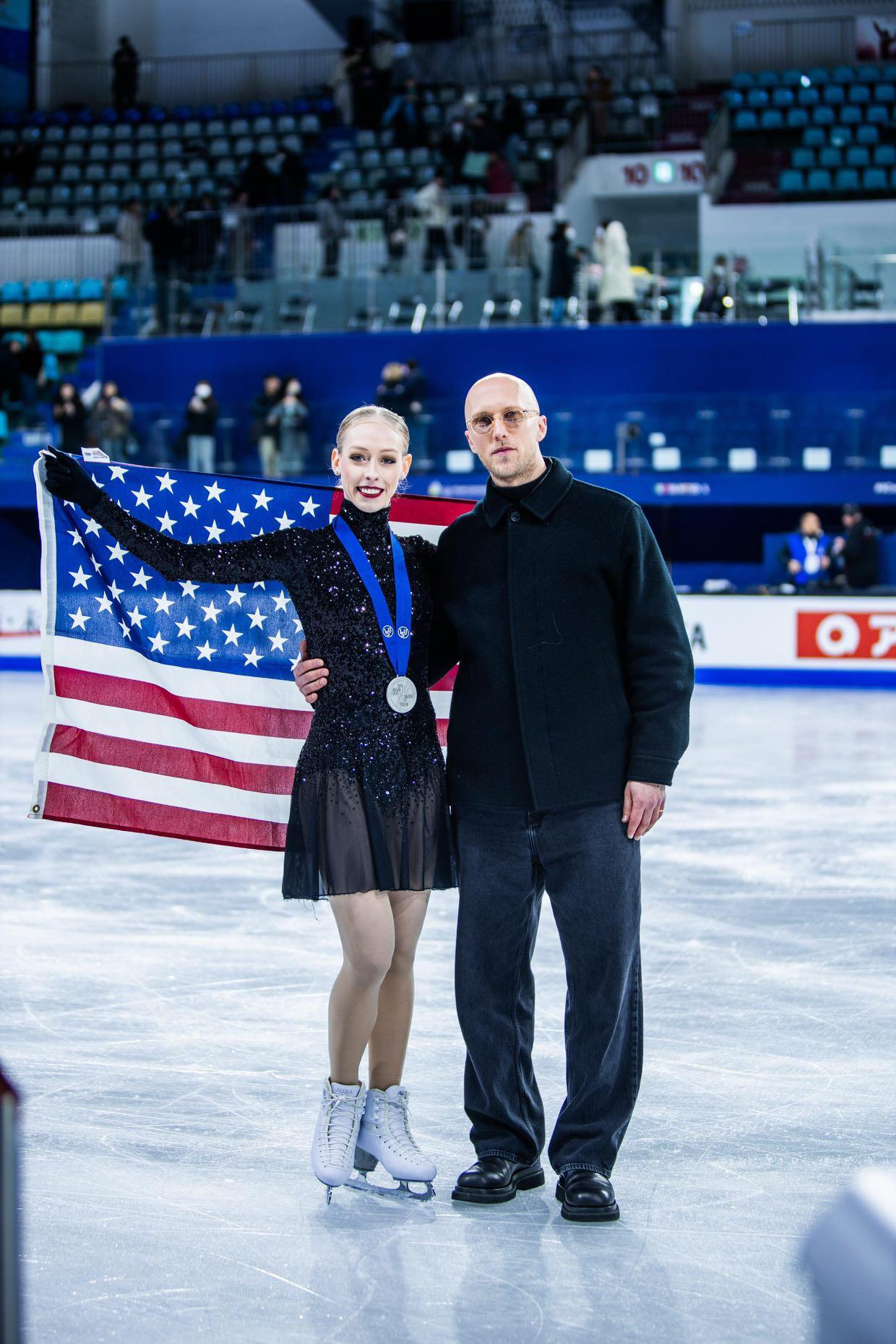
Richaud & Bradie Tennell at the 2025 Four Continents Figure Skating Championships

Following his retirement from competitive figure skating, Richaud has been working as a coach and choreographer in Nice. In an interview in February 2024, he talked about how he assisted his students during competitions. He was nominated for and won the "Best Figure Skating Choreographer" at the 2024 ISU Skating awards. He was also nominated in 2025. In 2026, he was nominated again and won his second ISU Skating Award as "Best Figure Skating Choreographer".

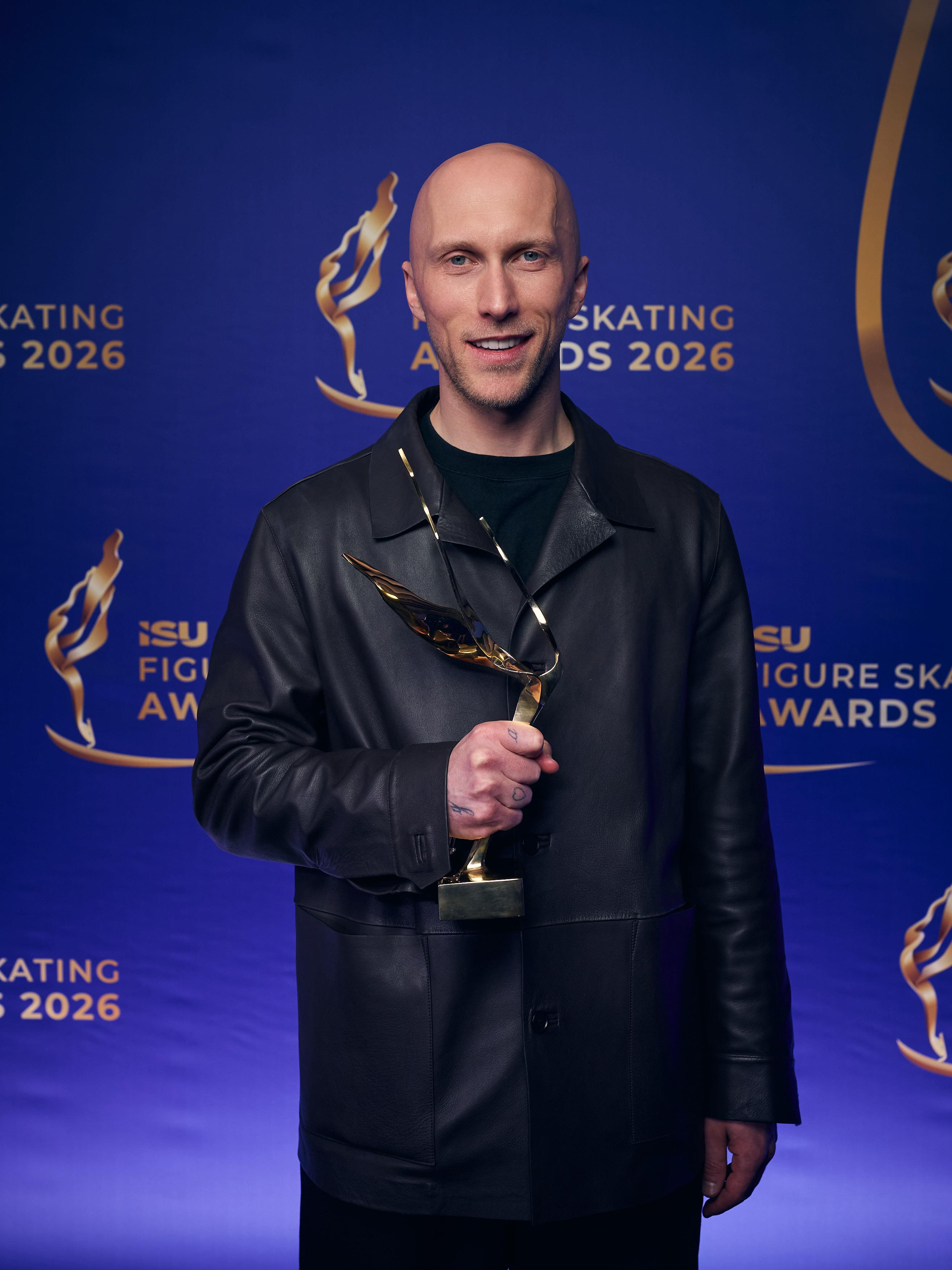
Richaud at the 2026 ISU Figure Skating Awards

During each summer, he works with high level international and Olympic skaters during Richaud's self-founded Peak Ice Camps, creating and improving upon his programs for the skaters for major competitions, including the Olympic Games. He stated that his work is as a choreographer is individualised and that there is "no formula", and varies depending on each skater he works with.

As a coach, his students have included:

- (China) An Xiangyi
- (United States) Alina Bonillo
- (Georgia (country)) Nika Egadze
- (Bulgaria) Alexandra Feigin
- (Canada) Stephen Gogolev
- (United States) Maxim Naumov
- (France) Adam Siao Him Fa
- (United States) Bradie Tennell

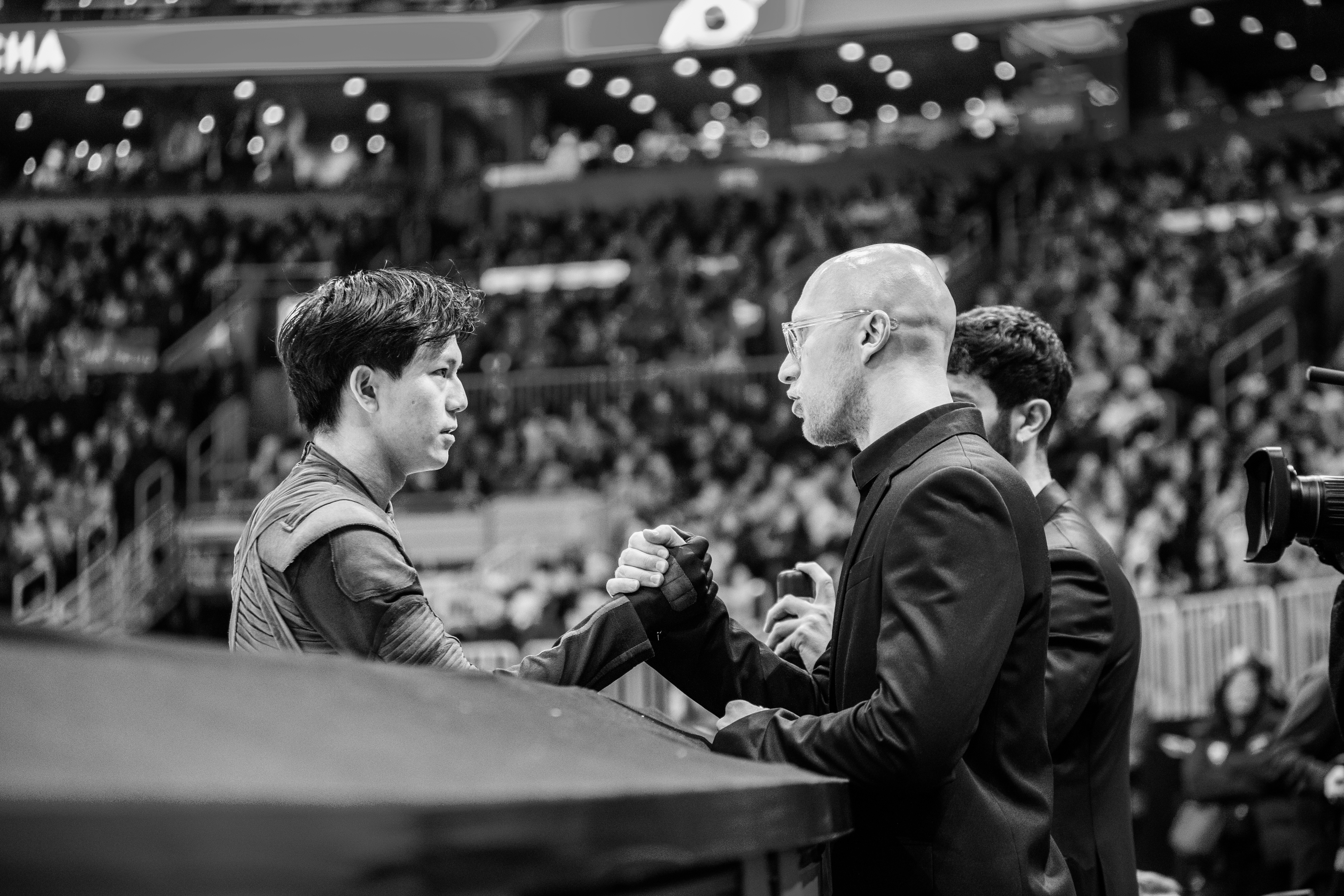
Richaud (right) with Adam Siao Him Fa (left), at the 2025 World Championships

Skaters he has choreographed for include:

- (United States) Jeremy Abbott
- (China) An Xiangyi
- (Switzerland) Olivia Bacsa
- (Turkey) Güzide Irmak Bayır
- (France) Chafik Besseghier
- (United States) Alina Bonillo
- (Switzerland) Anastasia Brandenburg
- (Czech Republic) Eliška Březinová
- (Czech Republic) Michal Březina
- (Mexico) Donovan Carrillo
- (China) Chen Yuxuan/Dong Yinbo
- (Switzerland) Ioulia Chtchetinina/Noah Scherer
- (Georgia (country)) Diana Davis/Gleb Smolkin
- (France) Loïcia Demougeot/Théo Le Mercier
- (Hungary) Polina Dzsumanyijazova
- (Georgia (country)) Nika Egadze
- (Bulgaria) Alexandra Feigin
- (United States) Kate Finster/Balázs Nagy
- (Italy) Gabriele Frangipani
- (France) Julie Froetscher
- (Germany) Genrikh Gartung
- (Canada) Stephen Gogolev
- (Lithuania) Aleksandra Golovkina
- (Switzerland) Anthea Gradinaru
- (Italy) Daniel Grassl
- (Germany) Minerva Fabienne Hase/Nikita Volodin
- (Monaco) Davide Lewton Brain
- (Spain) Tomàs-Llorenç Guarino Sabaté
- (Japan) Wakaba Higuchi
- (Japan) Moa Iwano
- (China) Jin Boyang
- (Finland) Janna Jyrkinen
- (Switzerland) Livia Kaiser
- (Croatia) Jari Kessler
- (Japan) Rika Kihira
- (Estonia) Eva-Lotta Kiibus
- (United States) Jessica Calalang/Brian Johnson
- (United States) Gabriella Izzo
- (South Korea) Kim Chae-Yeon
- (South Korea) Kim Hyun-gyeom
- (Cyprus) Marilena Kitromilis
- (United States) Alexa Knierim/Chris Knierim
- (Latvia) Angelīna Kučvaļska
- (Poland) Ekaterina Kurakova
- (South Korea) Lee Hae-in
- (Estonia) Arlet Levandi
- (United States) Isabeau Levito
- (Russia) Alla Loboda/Pavel Drozd
- (Austria) Luc Maierhofer
- (France) Maïa Mazzara
- (France) Maé-Bérénice Méité
- (Georgia (country)) Anastasiia Metelkina / Luka Berulava
- (Japan) Mai Mihara
- (Japan) Kao Miura
- (Japan) Satoko Miyahara
- (Mexico) Andrea Montesinos Cantú
- (Russia) Sofia Muravieva
- (Hungary) Lucie Mysliveckova/Lukas Csolley
- (United States) Maxim Naumov
- (Sweden) Andreas Nordebäck
- (Japan) Nobunari Oda
- (Turkey) Başar Oktar
- (Finland) Oona Ounasvuori
- (Hungary) Maria Pavlova/Alexei Sviatchenko
- (Belgium) Nina Pinzarrone
- (France) François Pitot
- (Poland) Justyna Plutowska/Jérémie Flemin
- (Canada) Aleksa Rakic
- (Belgium) Lilou Remeysen
- (Switzerland) Naoki Rossi
- (Japan) Kaori Sakamoto
- (Japan) Shun Sato
- (Germany) Aljona Savchenko/Bruno Massot
- (Israel) Mariia Seniuk
- (France) Adam Siao Him Fa
- (France) Lorine Schild
- (Poland) Noelle Streuli
- (Finland) Makar Suntsev
- (Japan) Daisuke Takahashi
- (Kazakhstan) Denis Ten
- (United States) Bradie Tennell
- (United States) Lindsay Thorngren
- (Hungary) Ivett Tóth
- (Russia) Alexandra Trusova
- (Russia) Elizaveta Tuktamysheva
- (Russia) Kamila Valieva
- (Netherlands) Lindsay van Zundert
- (Latvia) Deniss Vasiljevs
- (China) Wang Yihan
- (Japan) Sōta Yamamoto
- (Japan) Hana Yoshida
- (China) Yu Xiaoyu/Zhang Hao
- (China) Zhang He
- (China) Zhang Jiaxuan/Huang Yihang
- (China) Zhang Ruiyang
- (China) Zhu Yi
- (United States) Emilea Zingas/Vadym Kolesnik

=== 2026 Winter Olympics ===
At the 2026 Winter Olympics, Richaud, described by the Associated Press as "the busiest coach/choreographer of the Milan Cortina Winter Olympics", garnered media attention for coaching 16 skaters of 13 nationalities and switching team jackets for each of the skaters he supported. At those Olympics, he was the coach of Stephen Gogolev of Canada and Nika Egadze of Georgia, among others.

== Results ==
JGP: ISU Junior Grand Prix

=== With Findlay ===
International
Event	2008–09
European Championships	19th
International: Junior
World Junior Championships	10th
JGP Belarus	3rd
JGP France	4th
National
French Championships	3rd

=== With Brouiller ===
International
Event	2005–06	2006–07
World Junior Championships	13th	7th
JGP Final		7th
JGP Estonia	5th	
JGP France		3rd
JGP Japan	4th	
JGP Mexico		2nd
National
French Championships	1st J	2nd J
Masters	2nd J	2nd J
J. = Junior level
