= Lou Terreaux =

French ice dancer (born 2002)

Personal information
- Born: 14 April 2002 (age 24) Belfort, France
- Height: 1.70 m (5 ft 7 in)

Figure skating career
- Country: France
- Discipline: Ice dance
- Partner: Noé Perron (2016–25)
- Coach: Olivier Schoenfelder; Marien de la Asuncion; Muriel Zazoui
- Skating club: Villard de Lans SC
- Began skating: 2007

Lou Terreaux (born 14 April 2002) is a French ice dancer. With former partner, Noé Perron, she is the 2022 Bavarian Open and Bosphorus Cup bronze medalist. The two represented France at the 2020 World Junior Championships.

== Career ==
=== Early years ===
Terreaux began learning to skate in 2007. She teamed up with Noé Perron by 2016. Early in their career, the two were coached by Eric Le Mercier and were members of ASM Belfort.

Terreaux/Perron debuted on the ISU Junior Grand Prix (JGP) series in August–September 2018, placing eighth in Linz, Austria. They trained in Villard-de-Lans, coached by Karine Arribert-Narce, Violetta Zakhlyupana, and Vladimir Pastukhov.

Terreaux/Perron retained the same coaches for the 2019–20 season. They had two JGP assignments, placing sixth in France and eighth in Russia. Silver medalists at the French Junior Championships, they were named in France's team to the 2020 World Junior Championships in Tallinn. The two finished fifteenth overall in Estonia after placing fifteenth in both segments.

=== Senior career ===
==== 2021–22 season ====
Terreaux/Perron made their senior international debut in October 2021, at the 2021 Master's de Patinage and 2021 Trophée Métropole Nice Côte d'Azur, where they finished sixth and eighth, respectively. Going on to compete on the 2021–22 ISU Challenger Series, the duo finished sixth at the 2021 CS Denis Ten Memorial Challenge. They would subsequently finish fifth at the 2021 Open d'Andorra.

In December, the team finished sixth at the 2022 French Championships. They would then finish the season by winning bronze at the Bavarian Open in Oberstdorf, Germany.

==== 2022–23 season ====
Terreaux/Perron started the season by finishing sixth at the 2022 CS Nebelhorn Trophy before subsequently finishing fifth at the 2022 Master's de Patinage. Continuing to compete on the 2022–23 ISU Challenger Series, they placed eleventh at the 2022 CS Budapest Trophy and fourth at the 2022 CS Ice Challenge. They would then win bronze at the 2022 Bosphorus Cup.

In December, Terreaux/Perron won bronze at the 2023 French Championships. They would then close off the season with fourth-place finishes at the 2023 Bavarian Open and the 2023 Egna Dance Trophy.

==== 2023–24 season ====
Beginning the season at the 2023 CS Nebelhorn Trophy, Terreaux/Perron would finish the event in twelfth place. They would then go on to place fourth at the 2023 Master's de Patinage and eighth at the 2023 CS Warsaw Cup.

After a fourth-place finish at the 2024 French Championships, Terreaux/Perron would finish the season by winning silver at the 2024 Ephesus Cup and bronze at the 2024 Bavarian Open.

==== 2024–25 season ====
Terreaux/Perron started the season by finishing eighth at the 2024 CS Lombardia Trophy. They would subsequently place fifth at the 2024 Master's de Patinage.

== Programs ==
=== With Perron ===
Season	Rhythm dance	Free dance
2024–2025	Time of the Season by The Zombies; Fever; A Little Less Conversation by Elvis Presley choreo. by Marien de la Asuncion, Olivier Schoenfelder	Piano Concerto No. 3 in C-Sharp Minor, Op. 55: II. Larghetto by Ferdinand Ries; Requiem in D Minor, K. 626: VIII. Lacrimosa by Wolfgang Amadeus Mozart choreo. by Marien de la Asuncion, Olivier Schoenfelder
2022–2023	Rhumba: Chan Chan by Buena Vista Social Club; Salsa: Chan Chan by Salsa loco de Cuba; Samba: Hip Hip Chin Chin by Club des Belugas choreo. by Olivier Schoenfelder, Marien de la Asuncion, Muriel Zazoui	I'm a Man by Black Strobe; Is This Desire by PJ Harvey; Wish by Anna Calvi choreo. by Olivier Schoenfelder, Marien de la Asuncion, Muriel Zazoui
2019–2020	Foxtrot: My Girl; Swing: Hey Joe choreo. by Karine Arribert-Narce	Ódinn by Skáld; God's Whisper by Raury; Decimator by Two Steps from Hell choreo. by Karine Arribert-Narce
2018–2019	Tango: Au suivant by Siri Vik; Tango: Ma chanson des vieux amants performed by Novafonic Orchestra choreo. by Karine Arribert-Narce	Dance of the Sugar; Porz Goret by Yann Tiersen; Dance of the Sugar choreo. by Karine Arribert-Narce

== Competitive highlights ==
CS: Challenger Series; JGP: Junior Grand Prix

=== With Perron ===
International
Event	16–17	17–18	18–19	19–20	20–21	21–22	22–23	23–24	24–25
CS Budapest							11th		
CS Denis Ten						6th		WD	
CS Golden Spin									WD
CS Ice Challenge							4th		
CS Lombardia Trophy									8th
CS Nebelhorn							6th	12th	
CS Tallinn Trophy									10th
CS Warsaw Cup								8th	
Bavarian Open						3rd	4th	3rd	
Bosphorus Cup							3rd		
Egna Trophy							4th		7th
Ephesus Cup								2nd	
Ice Challenge									5th
Open d'Andorra						5th			
Trophée Métropole Nice						8th			
Winter University Games									2nd
International: Junior
Junior Worlds				15th					
JGP Austria			8th						
JGP France				6th					
JGP Russia				8th					
Bavarian Open		5th							
Bosphorus Cup				10th					
Egna Trophy			8th		4th				
Ice Star				5th					
Pavel Roman			WD						
Santa Claus Cup		11th							
Toruń Cup			11th	6th					
Volvo Open Cup				6th					
National
French Champ.	8th J	6th J	5th J	2nd J	3rd J	6th	3rd	4th	
Masters	9th J	5th J	3rd J	3rd J	3rd J	6th	5th		5th

== Detailed results ==
=== Ice dance with Noé Perron ===
ISU personal best scores in the +5/-5 GOE System
Segment	Type	Score	Event
Total	TSS	159.28	2024 CS Tallinn Trophy
Rhythm dance	TSS	66.18	2022 CS Nebelhorn Trophy
Rhythm dance	TES	38.57	2022 CS Nebelhorn Trophy
Rhythm dance	PCS	27.86	2024 CS Tallinn Trophy
Free dance	TSS	97.24	2024 CS Tallinn Trophy
Free dance	TES	55.34	2024 CS Tallinn Trophy
Free dance	PCS	42.90	2024 CS Tallinn Trophy

Results in the 2024–25 season
Date	Event	RD		FD		Total	
Date	Event	P	Score	P	Score	P	Score
Sep 13–15, 2024	(Italy) 2024 CS Lombardia Trophy	8	61.77	8	94.16	8	155.93
Sep 26–28, 2024	(France) 2024 Master's de Patinage	5	63.51	5	93.96	5	157.47
Nov 5–10, 2024	(Austria) 2024 Ice Challenge	5	62.38	4	99.79	5	162.17
Nov 12–17, 2024	(Estonia) 2024 CS Tallinn Trophy	11	62.04	10	97.24	10	159.28
Dec 4–7, 2024	(Croatia) 2024 CS Golden Spin of Zagreb	11	58.13	—N/a	—N/a	–	WD
Jan 16–18, 2025	(Italy) 2025 Winter University Games	3	65.17	2	103.43	2	168.60
