= Noé Perron =

French-Canadian ice dancer (born 2000)

Personal information
- Born: 18 November 2000 (age 25) Belfort, France
- Height: 1.79 m (5 ft 10 1/2 in)

Figure skating career
- Country: Canada (since 2025); France (until 2025)
- Partner: Nadiia Bashynska (since 2025); Lou Terreaux (2016–25)
- Coach: Olivier Schoenfelder; Marien de la Asuncion; Muriel Zazoui; Scott Moir; Madison Hubbell; Adrián Díaz
- Skating club: IAM London
- Began skating: 2005

Noé Perron (born 18 November 2000) is a French ice dancer. With former partner, Lou Terreaux, he is the 2022 Bavarian Open and Bosphorus Cup bronze medalist. The two represented France at the 2020 World Junior Championships.

== Career ==
Noé Perron began learning to skate in 2005.

=== Ice dance with Terreaux for France ===
As a young ice dancer, he skated with Clémence Vitti and Clara Ekici. He teamed up with Lou Terreaux by 2016. Early in their career, the two were coached by Eric Le Mercier.

Terreaux/Perron debuted on the ISU Junior Grand Prix (JGP) series in August–September 2018, placing eighth in Linz, Austria. They trained in Villard-de-Lans, coached by Karine Arribert-Narce, Violetta Zakhlyupana, and Vladimir Pastukhov.

Terreaux/Perron retained the same coaches for the 2019–20 season. They had two JGP assignments, placing sixth in France and eighth in Russia. Silver medalists at the French Junior Championships, they were named in France's team to the 2020 World Junior Championships in Tallinn. The two finished fifteenth overall in Estonia after placing fifteenth in both segments.

==== 2021–22 season ====
Terreaux/Perron made their senior international debut in October 2021, at the 2021 Master's de Patinage and 2021 Trophée Métropole Nice Côte d'Azur, where they finished sixth and eighth, respectively. Going on to compete on the 2021–22 ISU Challenger Series, the duo finished sixth at the 2021 CS Denis Ten Memorial Challenge. They would subsequently finish fifth at the 2021 Open d'Andorra.

In December, the team finished sixth at the 2022 French Championships. They would then finish the season by winning bronze at the Bavarian Open in Oberstdorf, Germany.

==== 2022–23 season ====
Terreaux/Perron started the season by finishing sixth at the 2022 CS Nebelhorn Trophy before subsequently finishing fifth at the 2022 Master's de Patinage. Continuing to compete on the 2022–23 ISU Challenger Series, they placed eleventh at the 2022 CS Budapest Trophy and fourth at the 2022 CS Ice Challenge. They would then win bronze at the 2022 Bosphorus Cup.

In December, Terreaux/Perron won bronze at the 2023 French Championships. They would then close off the season with fourth-place finishes at the 2023 Bavarian Open and the 2023 Egna Dance Trophy.

==== 2023–24 season ====
Beginning the season at the 2023 CS Nebelhorn Trophy, Terreaux/Perron would finish the event in twelfth place. They would then go on to place fourth at the 2023 Master's de Patinage and eighth at the 2023 CS Warsaw Cup.

After a fourth-place finish at the 2024 French Championships, Terreaux/Perron would finish the season by winning silver at the 2024 Ephesus Cup and bronze at the 2024 Bavarian Open.

==== 2024–25 season ====
Terreaux/Perron started the season by finishing eighth at the 2024 CS Lombardia Trophy. They would subsequently place fifth at the 2024 Master's de Patinage.

On May 6, 2025, Terreaux/Perron announced the end of their partnership via Instagram.

=== Ice dance with Nadiia Bashynska for Canada ===
==== 2025–26 season ====
In May 2025, Perron was contacted by Ukrainian-Canadian ice dancer, Nadiia Bashynska, asking whether he would be interested in having a try-out with her to which he agreed. Following this, the pair decided to team-up and represent Canada. It was subsequently announced that they would split their time between training under Perron's longtime coaches, Olivier Schoenfelder, Marien de la Asuncion, and Muriel Zazoui as well as in Ontario under Scott Moir, Madison Hubbell, and Adrián Díaz.

Bashynka/Perron opened their season with an eighth-place finish at the 2025 Skate Canada Challenge. They subsequently went on to finish tenth at the 2026 Canadian Championships.

== Programs ==
=== Ice dance with Nadiia Bashynska ===
Season	Rhythm dance	Free dance
2025–2026	Come As You Are; Smells Like Teen Spirit; Stay Away by Nirvana choreo. by Olivier Schoenfelder	Heart of Glass (Crabtree Remix) by Blondie & Philip Glass; Escape! (from The Hours) by Michael Riesman & Philip Glass choreo. by Marien de la Asuncion

=== Ice dance with Lou Terreaux ===
Season	Rhythm dance	Free dance
2024–2025	Time of the Season by The Zombies; Fever; A Little Less Conversation by Elvis Presley choreo. by Marien de la Asuncion, Olivier Schoenfelder	Piano Concerto No. 3 in C-Sharp Minor, Op. 55: II. Larghetto by Ferdinand Ries; Requiem in D Minor, K. 626: VIII. Lacrimosa by Wolfgang Amadeus Mozart choreo. by Marien de la Asuncion, Olivier Schoenfelder
2022–2023	Rhumba: Chan Chan by Buena Vista Social Club; Salsa: Chan Chan by Salsa loco de Cuba; Samba: Hip Hip Chin Chin by Club des Belugas choreo. by Olivier Schoenfelder, Marien de la Asuncion, Muriel Zazoui	I'm a Man by Black Strobe; Is This Desire by PJ Harvey; Wish by Anna Calvi choreo. by Olivier Schoenfelder, Marien de la Asuncion, Muriel Zazoui
2019–2020	Foxtrot: My Girl; Swing: Hey Joe choreo. by Karine Arribert-Narce	Ódinn by Skáld; God's Whisper by Raury; Decimator by Two Steps from Hell choreo. by Karine Arribert-Narce
2018–2019	Tango: Au suivant by Siri Vik; Tango: Ma chanson des vieux amants performed by Novafonic Orchestra choreo. by Karine Arribert-Narce	Dance of the Sugar; Porz Goret by Yann Tiersen; Dance of the Sugar choreo. by Karine Arribert-Narce

== Competitive highlights ==
- JGP – Event of the ISU Junior Grand Prix Series
- CS – Event of the ISU Challenger Series
- TBD – Assigned
- WD – Withdraw

=== Ice dance with Nadiia Bashynska ===
Competition placements at senior level
Season	2025–26	2026–27
Canadian Championships	10th	
CS Trialeti Trophy		7th
Skate Canada Challenge	8th	

=== Ice dance with Lou Terreaux ===
International
Event	16–17	17–18	18–19	19–20	20–21	21–22	22–23	23–24	24–25
CS Budapest							11th		
CS Denis Ten						6th			
CS Golden Spin of Zagreb									WD
CS Ice Challenge							4th		
CS Lombardia Trophy									8th
CS Nebelhorn							6th	12th	
CS Tallinn Trophy									10th
CS Warsaw Cup								8th	
Bavarian Open						3rd	4th	3rd	
Bosphorus Cup							3rd		
Egna Trophy							4th		7th
Ephesus Cup								2nd	
Ice Challenge									5th
Open d'Andorra						5th			
Trophée Métropole Nice						8th			
Winter University Games									2nd
International: Junior
Junior Worlds				15th					
JGP Austria			8th						
JGP France				6th					
JGP Russia				8th					
Bavarian Open		5th							
Bosphorus Cup				10th					
Egna Trophy			8th		4th				
Ice Star				5th					
Pavel Roman			WD						
Santa Claus Cup		11th							
Toruń Cup			11th	6th					
Volvo Open Cup				6th					
National
French Champ.	8th J	6th J	5th J	2nd J	3rd J	6th	3rd	4th	
Masters	9th J	5th J	3rd J	3rd J	3rd J	6th	5th	4th	5th

== Detailed results ==
=== Ice dance with Nadiia Bashynska ===
Results in the 2026–27 season
Date	Event	SP		FS		Total	
Date	Event	P	Score	P	Score	P	Score
Oct 1–4, 2026	(Georgia (country)) 2026 CS Trialeti Trophy	8	62.28	3	98.27	7	160.55

Results in the 2025–26 season
Date	Event	SP		FS		Total	
Date	Event	P	Score	P	Score	P	Score
Nov 27–29, 2025	2025 Skate Canada Challenge	7	61.06	9	88.95	8	150.01
Jan 5–11, 2026	(Canada) 2026 Canadian Championships	10	60.46	10	99.87	10	160.33

=== Ice dance with Lou Terreaux ===
ISU personal best scores in the +5/-5 GOE System
Segment	Type	Score	Event
Total	TSS	159.28	2024 CS Tallinn Trophy
Rhythm dance	TSS	66.18	2022 CS Nebelhorn Trophy
Rhythm dance	TES	38.57	2022 CS Nebelhorn Trophy
Rhythm dance	PCS	27.86	2024 CS Tallinn Trophy
Free dance	TSS	97.24	2024 CS Tallinn Trophy
Free dance	TES	55.34	2024 CS Tallinn Trophy
Free dance	PCS	42.90	2024 CS Tallinn Trophy

Results in the 2024–25 season
Date	Event	RD		FD		Total	
Date	Event	P	Score	P	Score	P	Score
Sep 13–15, 2024	(Italy) 2024 CS Lombardia Trophy	8	61.77	8	94.16	8	155.93
Sep 26–28, 2024	(France) 2024 Master's de Patinage	5	63.51	5	93.96	5	157.47
Nov 5–10, 2024	(Austria) 2024 Ice Challenge	5	62.38	4	99.79	5	162.17
Nov 12–17, 2024	(Estonia) 2024 CS Tallinn Trophy	11	62.04	10	97.24	10	159.28
Dec 4–7, 2024	(Croatia) 2024 CS Golden Spin of Zagreb	11	58.13	—N/a	—N/a	–	WD
Jan 16–18, 2025	(Italy) 2025 Winter University Games	3	65.17	2	103.43	2	168.60
