= Anna Pezzetta =

Italian figure skater (born 2007)

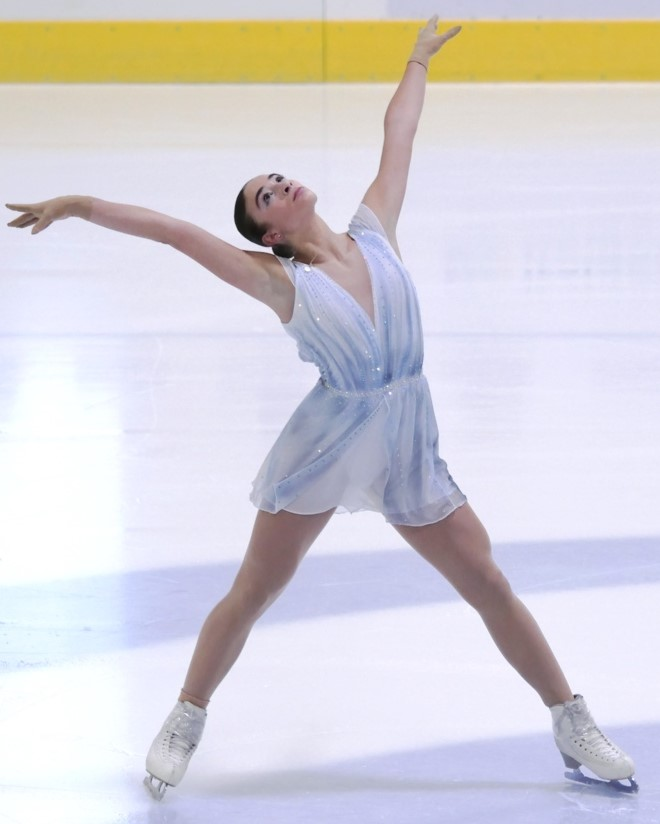
- Anna Pezzetta at the 2022 Lombardia Trophy

Personal information
- Born: 6 March 2007 (age 19) Bolzano, Italy
- Height: 1.59 m (5 ft 2 1/2 in)

Figure skating career
- Country: Italy
- Discipline: Women's singles
- Coach: Alisa Mikonsaari; Angelina Turenko
- Skating club: IceLab
- Began skating: 2012

Medal record
Italian Championships
Gold medal – first place	2025 Varese	Singles
Silver medal – second place	2022 Turin	Singles
Bronze medal – third place	2023 Brunico	Singles
Bronze medal – third place	2024 Pinerolo	Singles
World Team Trophy
Bronze medal – third place	2025 Tokyo	Team

Anna Pezzetta (born 6 March 2007) is an Italian figure skater. She is the 2025 Italian national champion and a four-time Challenger Series medalist (two golds, two silvers).

On the junior level, Pezzetta is the 2021 Italian junior national champion and competed at three World Junior Championships (2022, 2023, 2025).

== Personal life ==
Pezzetta was born on 6 March 2007 in Bolzano, Italy.

== Career ==
=== Early career ===
Pezzetta began figure skating in 2012. Her accomplishments as a novice skater include a gold medal at the 2019 Egna Spring Trophy and at the 2019 Eiscup Innsbruck.

=== 2020–21 season: Junior debut ===
Pezzetta made her debut at the 2021 Italian Junior Championships, winning the gold medal. She would then go on to win a silver medal at the 2021 Egna Spring Trophy as a junior.

=== 2021–22 season ===
Pezzetta began her season by winning a silver medal at the 2021 NRW Trophy. Debuting as a senior skater at the 2022 Italian Championships, Pezzetta won the silver medal behind Lara Naki Gutmann. She would then go on to win silver at the 2022 Bavarian Open, gold at the 2022 Merano Cup, bronze at the 2022 International Challenge Cup, and gold at the 2022 Egna Spring Trophy.

Competing at the 2022 World Junior Championships in Tallinn, Estonia, Pezzetta placed twenty-fourth in the short program, qualifying for the free skate segment. She then went on to perform a solid free skate, placing ninth in that segment of the competition and moving up to thirteenth-place overall.

=== 2022–23 season: Senior international debut ===
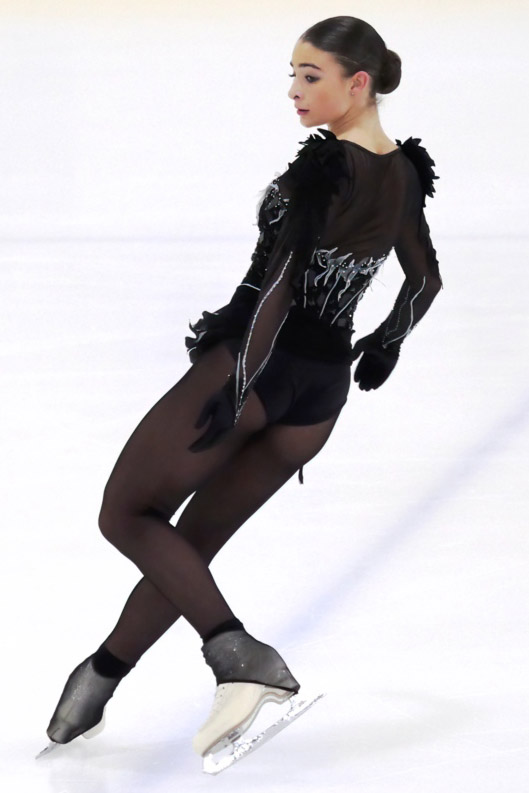
Pezzetta during her free skate at the 2022 CS Lombardia Trophy

Pezzetta began her season as a senior at the 2022 CS Lombardia Trophy, finishing twelfth. Debuting on the Junior Grand Prix series, Pezzetta placed fourteenth at the 2022 JGP Poland I and thirteenth at the 2022 JGP Italy. She then went on to win the gold medal at the 2022 CS Ice Challenge.

At the 2023 Italian Championships, Pezzetta won the bronze medal behind Lara Naki Gutmann and Ginevra Negrello. She then participated at the 2023 European Youth Olympic Festival, where she won the silver medal behind Iida Karhunen of Finland.

At the 2023 World Junior Championships in Calgary, Alberta, Pezzetta placed twenty-seventh in the short program after stepping out of a planned triple lutz and popping a planned triple loop into a single. As a result of this placement, Pezzetta failed to qualify for the free skate segment of the competition. Pezzetta then joined Team Italy at the 2023 World Team Trophy, where she was ninth in the short program and eleventh in the free skate. Team Italy finished fourth overall.

=== 2023–24 season ===
Pezzetta made one appearance on the Junior Grand Prix, coming eleventh at the 2023 JGP Hungary. She went on to compete on the senior level, placing sixth at the 2023 CS Finlandia Trophy and fourth at the 2023 Cup of Nice. Pezzetta subsequently won her second medal on the ISU Challenger Series, a silver at the 2023 CS Warsaw Cup. She also competed at the 2023 CS Golden Spin of Zagreb, where she placed sixth.

At the 2024 Italian Championships, Pezzetta won the short program but placed fourth in the free skate, dropping down to third place overall. She then closed the season with an eighth-place finish at the 2024 Challenge Cup.

=== 2024–25 season: First national title ===
Pezzetta began the season by finishing fifth at the 2024 CS Lombardia Trophy. Going on to compete on the 2024–25 ISU Junior Grand Prix circuit, Pezzetta finished fourth at 2024 JGP Poland and fifth at 2024 JGP Slovenia.

In November, Pezzetta competed on the senior level at the 2024 Ice Challenge, where she won the gold medal. She would then go on to finish fifth at the 2024 CS Warsaw Cup that same month. At the 2025 Italian Championships, Pezzetta placed second in the short program but won the free skate, allowing her to capture the gold medal overall. She won the event by almost fourteen points.

In January, Pezzetta debuted at the European Championships. She placed sixth in the short program and finished in fifth place overall following a fourth-place free skate. “I'm very happy,” said Pezzetta after the free skate. “It was my goal to actually just participate in this event. Today, I really felt the nerves and made some mistakes, but I'm actually very proud of myself for not giving up and for keeping the fight going. It was a very good experience for me, something I gained a lot from.”

The following month, Pezzetta competed at the 2025 World Junior Championships in Debrecen, Hungary, where she placed thirteenth.

Selected to compete for Team Italy at the 2025 World Team Trophy, Pezzetta placed ninth in the short program and eleventh in the free skate segments. Team Italy would go on to win the bronze medal overall.

=== 2025–26 season ===
Pezzetta opened the season by competing on the 2025–26 ISU Challenger Series, winning silver at the 2025 CS Nepela Memorial and finishing fourth at the 2025 CS Trialeti Trophy. She then went on to debut on the Grand Prix circuit, placing eighth at the 2025 Cup of China and at the 2025 NHK Trophy. Pezzetta subsequently followed up these results by finishing seventh at the 2025 CS Warsaw Cup.

In December, she finished fourth at the 2026 Italian Championships. The following month, Pezzetta competed at the 2026 European Championships in Sheffield, England, United Kingdom. She placed third in the short program, winning a small ISU bronze medal, but only thirteenth in the free skate, dropping to eighth place overall.

=== 2026–27 season ===
Pezzetta opened her season at the 2026 CS Budapest Trophy, finishing thirteenth with 159.31 points. She subsequently competed at the 2026 Skate Canada International, where she placed twelfth overall with 152.80 points.

In November, Pezzetta won the women's event at the NRW Trophy in Dortmund, rising from fourth after the short program to first overall with 171.23 points, more than eleven points ahead of silver medalist Eugenia Sekulovski. The following week, she competed at the 2026 Finlandia Trophy, placing tenth in the short program and seventh in the free skate. She finished ninth overall with a season-best total of 176.65 points.

== Programs ==
Season	Short program	Free skating	Exhibition
2026–2027	Malagueña by Ernesto Lecuona	Black Swan; Night of Terror; Stumbled Beginnings...; Perfection by Clint Mansell choreo. by Adam Solya	
2025–2026	Exercises in Free Love by Freddie Mercury, Montserrat Caballé, & Michael Moran choreo. by Adam Solya	Black Swan; Night of Terror; Stumbled Beginnings...; Perfection by Clint Mansell choreo. by Adam Solya	
2024–2025	The Firebird Suite; Round of the Princesses (Corovod); Infernal Dance of King Kastchei; Finale by Igor Stravinsky choreo. by Adam Solya	Avatar; You Don't Dream in Cryo. ....; Becoming One of "The People", Becoming One with Neytiri; I See You by James Horner performed by Leona Lewis choreo. by Luca Lanotte	I Like It by Cardi B, Bad Bunny, & J Balvin
2023–2024	Fly; Experience by Ludovico Einaudi choreo. by Massimo Scali	The Four Seasons: Winter by Antonio Vivaldi; Crying Violin by Ayako Ishikawa choreo. by Massimo Scali	
2022–2023	Fly; Experience by Ludovico Einaudi choreo. by Massimo Scali	The Four Seasons: Winter by Antonio Vivaldi; Crying Violin by Ayako Ishikawa choreo. by Massimo Scali	
2021–2022	Asturias performed by Na Yoon-sun	Dead Silence by Charlie Clouser; Mephisto's Lullaby by Yair Albeg Wein and Or Kribos; O Fortuna by Carl Orff	

== Competitive highlights ==
- GP – Event of the ISU Grand Prix Series
- CS – Event of the ISU Challenger Series
- JGP – Event of the ISU Junior Grand Prix Series
- TBD – Assigned
- WD – Withdrew from competition
- Medals at team events are awarded for the team results only. Individual placements at team events are listed in parentheses.

Competition placements at senior level
Season	2021–22	2022–23	2023–24	2024–25	2025–26	2026–27
European Championships				5th	8th	
Italian Championships	2nd	3rd	3rd	1st	4th	
World Team Trophy		4th (11th)		3rd (11th)		
GP Cup of China					8th	
GP Finland						9th
GP NHK Trophy					8th	
GP Skate Canada						12th
CS Finlandia Trophy			6th			
CS Golden Spin of Zagreb			6th			
CS Ice Challenge		1st		1st		
CS Lombardia Trophy		12th		5th		
CS Nepela Memorial					2nd	
CS Trialeti Trophy					4th	
CS Warsaw Cup			2nd	5th	7th	
CS Budapest Trophy						13th
Trophée Métropole Nice			4th			
Challenge Cup			8th			
NRW Trophy						1st

Competition placements at junior level
Season	2020–21	2021–22	2022–23	2023–24	2024–25
World Junior Championships		13th	27th		13th
Italian Championships	1st				
JGP Hungary				11th	
JGP Italy			13th		
JGP Poland			14th		4th
JGP Slovenia					5th
Bavarian Open		2nd			
Challenge Cup		3rd			
Egna Spring Trophy	2nd	1st			
European Youth Olympic Festival			2nd		
Merano Cup		1st			
NRW Trophy		2nd			
Open d'Andorra		WD			

== Detailed results ==
ISU personal best scores in the +5/-5 GOE System
Segment	Type	Score	Event
Total	**TSS**	**192.97**	2025 CS Nepela Memorial
Short program	**TSS**	**67.14**	2024 JGP Slovenia
Short program	TES	38.98	2024 JGP Slovenia
Short program	PCS	30.66	2025 CS Trialeti Trophy
Free skating	**TSS**	**126.19**	2025 CS Nepela Memorial
Free skating	TES	64.51	2025 CS Nepela Memorial
Free skating	PCS	61.68	2025 CS Nepela Memorial

=== Senior level ===
Results in the 2026–27 season
Date	Event	SP		FS		Total	
Date	Event	P	Score	P	Score	P	Score
Oct 15-18, 2026	(Hungary) 2026 CS Budapest Trophy	15	56.10	13	103.21	13	159.31
Oct 30 - Nov 1, 2026	2026 Skate Canada International	12	54.84	12	97.96	12	152.80
Nov 12-15, 2026	(Germany) 2026 NRW Trophy	4	53.54	1	117.69	1	171.23
Nov 20–22, 2026	(Finland) 2026 Finlandia Trophy	10	57.71	7	118.94	9	176.65

Results in the 2025-26 season
Date	Event	SP		FS		Total	
Date	Event	P	Score	P	Score	P	Score
Sep 25–27, 2025	(Slovakia) 2025 CS Nepela Memorial	2	66.78	2	126.19	2	192.97
Oct 8–11, 2025	(Georgia (country)) 2025 CS Trialeti Trophy	2	64.32	7	113.81	4	178.13
Oct 24–26, 2025	2025 Cup of China	9	61.89	8	116.45	8	178.34
Nov 7-9, 2025	(Japan) 2025 NHK Trophy	7	61.35	9	112.40	8	173.75
Nov 19–23, 2025	(Poland) 2025 CS Warsaw Cup	3	59.56	11	95.87	7	155.43
Dec 17–20, 2025	(Italy) 2026 Italian Championships	3	62.90	5	102.93	4	165.83
Jan 13–18, 2026	(United Kingdom) 2026 European Championships	3	64.85	13	112.29	8	177.14

**2024–25 season**
Date	Event	SP	FS	Total
April 17–20, 2025	2025 World Team Trophy	9; 62.25	11; 98.41	3T/11P; 160.66
December 19–21, 2024	2025 Italian Championships	2; 60.37	1; 134.46	1; 194.83
November 20–24, 2024	2024 CS Warsaw Cup	3; 57.96	7; 109.42	5; 167.38
November 5–10, 2024	2024 Ice Challenge	1; 54.14	1; 115.30	1; 169.44
September 13–15, 2024	2024 CS Lombardia Trophy	4; 64.11	6; 105.28	5; 169.39
**2023–24 season**
Date	Event	SP	FS	Total
February 22–25, 2024	2024 Challenge Cup	5; 55.12	8; 95.21	8; 150.33
December 22–23, 2023	2024 Italian Championships	1; 66.42	4; 115.17	2; 181.59
December 6–9, 2023	2023 CS Golden Spin of Zagreb	8; 52.32	2; 106.92	6; 159.24
November 16–19, 2023	2023 CS Warsaw Cup	6; 61.25	2; 118.33	2; 179.58
October 18–22, 2023	2023 Trophée Métropole Nice Côte d'Azur	6; 48.67	2; 104.35	4; 153.02
October 4–8, 2023	2023 CS Finlandia Trophy	5; 60.18	8; 103.14	6; 163.32
2022–23 season
Date	Event	SP	FS	Total
April 13–16, 2023	2023 World Team Trophy	9; 56.13	11; 106.30	4T/11P; 162.43
December 15–18, 2022	2023 Italian Championships	3; 59.19	4; 105.99	3; 165.18
November 9–13, 2022	2022 CS Ice Challenge	3; 60.05	3; 114.44	1; 174.49
September 16–19, 2022	2022 CS Lombardia Trophy	6; 56.71	14; 77.84	12; 134.55
2021–22 season
Date	Event	SP	FS	Total
December 4–5, 2021	2022 Italian Championships	2; 60.63	2; 116.84	2; 177.47

=== Junior level ===
Current personal best scores are highlighted in bold.

**2024–25 season**
Date	Event	SP	FS	Total
February 25–March 2, 2025	2025 World Junior Championships	12; 60.01	13; 114.58	13; 174.59
October 2–5, 2024	2024 JGP Slovenia	3; 67.14	6; 112.62	5; 179.76
September 25–28, 2024	2024 JGP Poland	4; 64.78	7; 104.43	4; 169.21
**2023–24 season**
Date	Event	SP	FS	Total
September 20–23, 2023	2023 JGP Hungary	3; 61.12	14; 94.72	11; 155.84
2022–23 season
Date	Event	SP	FS	Total
February 27–March 5, 2023	2023 World Junior Championships	27; 47.47	–	27; 47.47
January 25–27, 2023	2023 European Youth Olympic Festival	2; 56.28	2; 111.68	2; 167.96
October 12–15, 2022	2022 JGP Italy	14; 51.30	14; 92.79	13; 144.09
September 28–October 1, 2022	2022 JGP Poland I	16; 51.08	13; 94.23	14; 145.31
2021–22 season
Date	Event	SP	FS	Total
April 13–17, 2022	2022 World Junior Championships	24; 51.75	9; 109.13	13; 160.88
April 7–10, 2022	2022 Egna Spring Trophy	1; 55.11	1; 117.85	1; 172.96
February 24–27, 2022	2022 International Challenge Cup	2; 58.02	6; 97.02	3; 155.04
February 5–6, 2022	2022 Merano Cup	1; 63.34	1; 93.72	1; 157.06
January 18–23, 2022	2022 Bavarian Open	6; 45.32	4; 104.94	2; 150.26
November 4–7, 2021	2021 NRW Trophy	1; 56.78	2; 89.86	2; 146.64
2020–21 season
Date	Event	SP	FS	Total
April 29–May 2, 2021	2021 Egna Spring Trophy	1; 57.29	2; 92.52	2; 149.81
April 9–11, 2021	2021 Italian Junior Championships	1; 60.20	1; 99.84	1; 160.04
