= 2023 CS Warsaw Cup =

Figure skating competition

- Type: ISU Challenger Series
- Date: November 15 – 17
- Season: 2023–24
- Location: Warsaw, Poland
- Host: Polish Figure Skating Association
- Venue: Arena COS Torwar

Champions
- Men's singles: (Switzerland) Lukas Britschgi
- Women's singles: (Poland) Ekaterina Kurakova
- Ice dance: (France) Evgenia Lopareva / Geoffrey Brissaud
- Previous: 2022 CS Warsaw Cup
- Next: 2024 CS Warsaw Cup
- Previous CS: 2023 CS Denis Ten Memorial Challenge
- Next CS: 2023 CS Golden Spin of Zagreb

The 2023 CS Warsaw Cup was held on November 15–17, 2023, in Warsaw, Poland. It was part of the 2023–24 ISU Challenger Series. Medals were awarded in men's singles, women's singles, and ice dance.

== Entries ==
The International Skating Union published the full list of entries on October 23, 2023.

Country	Men	Women	Ice dance
Argentina		Sophia Natalie Dayan	
Australia			Holly Harris / Jason Chan
Austria	Maurizio Zandron		
Belgium			Olivia Josephine Shilling / Léo Baeten
Czech Republic	Filip Ščerba	Barbora Vránková	
Estonia		Gerli Liinamäe	
Finland	Arttu Juusola; Valtter Virtanen	Linnea Ceder; Olivia Lisko; Emmi Peltonen	
France	Samy Hammi; François Pitot; Xan Rols	Maïa Mazzara; Léa Serna	Marie Dupayage / Thomas Nabais; Evgenia Lopareva / Geoffrey Brissaud; Lou Terreaux / Noé Perron
Germany	Kai Jagoda	Kristina Isaev	
Great Britain	Edward Appleby	Nina Povey	Layla Karnes / Liam Carr
Hungary		Regina Schermann; Dária Zsirnov	Lucy Hancock / Ilias Fourati
India		Tara Prasad	
Israel	Mark Gorodnitsky; Lev Vinokur	Elizabet Gervits	Shira Ichilov / Dmitriy Kravchenko; Mariia Nosovitskaya / Mikhail Nosovitskiy
Italy		Anna Pezzetta	Victoria Manni / Carlo Röthlisberger
Kazakhstan	Dias Jirenbayev		
Latvia		Anastasija Konga	
Lithuania		Aleksandra Golovkina	
Netherlands			Hanna Jakucs / Alessio Galli; Chelsea Verhaegh / Sherim van Geffen
Poland	Kornel Witkowski; Miłosz Witkowski; Matvii Yefymenko	Karolina Białas; Ekaterina Kurakova; Julija Polniuk; Agnieszka Rejment; Laura Szczęsna	Olexandra Borysova / Aaron Freeman; Sofiia Dovhal / Wiktor Kulesza; Olivia Oliver / Filip Bojanowski; Anastasia Polibina / Pavel Golovishnikov
Portugal	David Gouveia		
Slovakia	Adam Hagara	Ema Doboszová; Vanesa Šelmeková	Mária Sofia Pucherová / Nikita Lysak; Anna Šimová / Kirill Aksenov
South Korea			Hannah Lim / Ye Quan
Spain	Pablo García		
Sweden	Gabriel Folkesson		
Switzerland	Noah Bodenstein; Lukas Britschgi	Sara Franzi; Livia Kaiser; Alexia Paganini	
Ukraine	Andrii Kokura; Kyrylo Marsak	Mariia Andriichuk; Yelizaveta Babenko; Tatiana Firsova	Mariia Holubtsova / Kyryl Bielobrov; Zoe Larson / Andrii Kapran
United States	Jason Brown; Daniel Martynov	Elyce Lin-Gracey	

== Changes to preliminary assignments ==
Date	Discipline	Withdrew	Added	Notes	Ref.
November 1	Women	(France) Maé-Bérénice Méité	—N/a	—N/a	
November 1	Women	(Latvia) Angelīna Kučvaļska	(Latvia) Anastasija Konga	—N/a	
November 1	Ice dance	(Germany) Charise Matthaei & Max Liebers	—N/a	—N/a	
November 10	Men	(Philippines) Edrian Paul Celestino	—N/a	—N/a	
November 10	Men	(Switzerland) Naoki Rossi	—N/a	—N/a	
November 10	Women	(Estonia) Eva-Lotta Kiibus	—N/a	—N/a	
November 10	Women	(Israel) Mariia Seniuk	—N/a	—N/a	
November 13	Men	(Poland) Vladimir Samoilov	—N/a	—N/a	
November 13	Women	(South Korea) Ji Seo-yeon	—N/a	—N/a	
November 14	Men	(Ukraine) Ivan Shmuratko	—N/a	Now attending the 2023 Grand Prix of Espoo	
November 16	Men	(Canada) Roman Sadovsky	—N/a	Lost luggage	
November 16	Men	(Germany) Denis Gurdzhi	—N/a	—N/a	
November 16	Women	(United Kingdom) Kristen Spours	—N/a	—N/a	

== Results ==
=== Men's singles ===
Rank	Skater	Nation	Total points	SP		FS	
1st place, gold medalist(s)	Lukas Britschgi	Switzerland	246.22	1	91.51	3	154.71
2nd place, silver medalist(s)	Mark Gorodnitsky	Israel	243.29	2	82.06	1	161.23
3rd place, bronze medalist(s)	Jason Brown	United States	236.75	4	78.48	2	158.27
4	François Pitot	France	211.36	3	78.55	7	132.81
5	Maurizio Zandron	Austria	207.59	7	70.25	5	137.34
6	Samy Hammi	France	207.42	8	70.23	6	137.19
7	Gabriel Folkesson	Sweden	205.79	5	78.44	13	127.35
8	Adam Hagara	Slovakia	205.53	12	66.90	4	138.63
9	Edward Appleby	Great Britain	202.68	6	71.21	8	131.47
10	Valtter Virtanen	Finland	200.55	9	69.17	9	131.38
11	Daniel Martynov	United States	197.36	10	68.32	11	129.04
12	Xan Rols	France	197.04	11	68.14	12	128.90
13	Kai Jagoda	Germany	194.33	13	64.90	10	129.43
14	Kornel Witkowski	Poland	187.51	14	64.51	14	123.00
15	Kyrylo Marsak	Ukraine	184.15	15	62.79	16	121.36
16	Dias Jirenbayev	Kazakhstan	180.18	16	60.22	17	119.96
17	Matvii Yefymenko	Poland	179.09	17	59.59	18	119.50
18	Lev Vinokur	Israel	170.85	24	49.20	15	121.65
19	Pablo García	Spain	163.62	19	57.87	20	105.75
20	Andrii Kokura	Ukraine	162.33	22	55.04	19	107.29
21	Arttu Juusola	Finland	159.51	18	58.24	22	101.27
22	Miłosz Witkowski	Poland	159.00	20	55.24	21	103.76
23	Filip Ščerba	Czech Republic	147.87	21	55.05	23	92.82
24	Noah Bodenstein	Switzerland	145.06	23	53.01	24	92.05
25	David Gouveia	Portugal	117.47	25	43.04	25	74.43

=== Women's singles ===
Rank	Skater	Nation	Total points	SP		FS	
1st place, gold medalist(s)	Ekaterina Kurakova	Poland	181.71	6	57.45	1	124.26
2nd place, silver medalist(s)	Anna Pezzetta	Italy	179.58	2	61.25	2	118.33
3rd place, bronze medalist(s)	Elyce Lin-Gracey	United States	177.50	4	59.85	3	117.65
4	Léa Serna	France	174.59	5	58.23	4	116.36
5	Livia Kaiser	Switzerland	173.20	1	65.21	5	107.99
6	Sara Franzi	Switzerland	164.65	7	56.72	6	107.93
7	Aleksandra Golovkina	Lithuania	158.67	12	53.11	7	105.56
8	Emmi Peltonen	Finland	157.50	3	60.06	11	97.44
9	Nina Povey	Great Britain	153.79	10	53.51	8	100.28
10	Kristina Isaev	Germany	153.02	9	53.85	9	99.17
11	Olivia Lisko	Finland	149.21	8	53.89	13	95.32
12	Vanesa Šelmeková	Slovakia	148.43	11	53.34	14	95.09
13	Alexia Paganini	Switzerland	147.44	14	51.44	12	96.00
14	Laura Szczęsna	Poland	144.48	22	46.17	10	98.31
15	Anastasija Konga	Latvia	140.87	15	50.63	15	90.24
16	Karolina Białas	Poland	136.67	20	47.52	16	89.15
17	Linnea Ceder	Finland	135.48	16	50.63	18	84.85
18	Barbora Vránková	Czech Republic	133.45	13	51.74	21	81.71
19	Ema Doboszová	Slovakia	131.32	21	46.71	19	84.61
20	Mariia Andriichuk	Ukraine	130.92	25	43.91	17	87.01
21	Tatiana Firsova	Ukraine	130.47	18	49.70	23	80.77
22	Dária Zsirnov	Hungary	127.32	23	46.09	22	81.23
23	Elizabet Gervits	Israel	126.57	17	50.08	28	76.49
24	Gerli Liinamäe	Estonia	126.11	26	42.85	20	83.26
25	Yelizaveta Babenko	Ukraine	125.79	24	45.56	25	80.23
26	Julija Polniuk	Poland	125.77	19	48.09	27	77.68
27	Maïa Mazzara	France	122.47	28	42.11	24	80.36
28	Regina Schermann	Hungary	120.33	29	40.83	26	79.50
29	Agnieszka Rejment	Poland	102.40	31	32.73	29	69.67
30	Sophia Natalie Dayan	Argentina	97.28	30	36.91	30	60.37
WD	Tara Prasad	India	withdrew	27	42.31	withdrew from competition	

=== Ice dance ===
Rank	Team	Nation	Total points	RD		FD	
1st place, gold medalist(s)	Evgenia Lopareva / Geoffrey Brissaud	France	196.56	1	77.94	1	118.62
2nd place, silver medalist(s)	Hannah Lim / Ye Quan	South Korea	187.10	2	73.76	2	113.34
3rd place, bronze medalist(s)	Marie Dupayage / Thomas Nabais	France	179.05	3	72.18	3	106.87
4	Victoria Manni / Carlo Röthlisberger	Italy	168.23	4	64.89	5	103.34
5	Mariia Holubtsova / Kyryl Bielobrov	Ukraine	167.67	5	63.78	4	103.89
6	Mariia Nosovitskaya / Mikhail Nosovitskiy	Israel	164.08	6	62.83	6	101.25
7	Anna Šimová / Kirill Aksenov	Slovakia	157.73	9	61.68	7	96.05
8	Lou Terreaux / Noé Perron	France	155.92	10	60.62	8	95.30
9	Zoe Larson / Andrii Kapran	Ukraine	151.21	8	61.69	12	89.52
10	Layla Karnes / Liam Carr	Great Britain	149.97	11	60.23	11	89.74
11	Shira Ichilov / Dmitriy Kravchenko	Israel	149.09	15	55.63	9	93.46
12	Sofiia Dovhal / Wiktor Kulesza	Poland	147.83	14	56.01	10	91.82
13	Mária Sofia Pucherová / Nikita Lysak	Slovakia	146.45	7	61.77	15	84.68
14	Olivia Oliver / Filip Bojanowski	Poland	146.11	13	57.83	13	88.28
15	Holly Harris / Jason Chan	Australia	143.25	12	60.22	17	83.03
16	Lucy Hancock / Ilias Fourati	Hungary	140.75	17	54.20	14	86.55
17	Olivia Josephine Shilling / Léo Baeten	Belgium	138.72	16	54.75	16	83.97
18	Hanna Jakucs / Alessio Galli	Netherlands	135.84	18	53.91	18	81.93
19	Olexandra Borysova / Aaron Freeman	Poland	124.47	20	46.56	20	77.91
20	Chelsea Verhaegh / Sherim van Geffen	Netherlands	122.88	21	44.79	19	78.09
WD	Anastasia Polibina / Pavel Golovishnikov	Poland	withdrew	19	48.85	withdrew from competition	
