= 2022 CS Nebelhorn Trophy =

- Type: ISU Challenger Series
- Date: September 21 – 24
- Season: 2022–23
- Location: Oberstdorf, Germany
- Host: Deutsche Eislauf Union
- Venue: Eissportzentrum Oberstdorf

Champions
- Men's singles: (Canada) Keegan Messing
- Women's singles: (Belgium) Loena Hendrickx
- Pairs: (Canada) Deanna Stellato-Dudek / Maxime Deschamps
- Ice dance: (United Kingdom) Lilah Fear / Lewis Gibson
- Previous: 2021 CS Nebelhorn Trophy
- Next: 2023 CS Nebelhorn Trophy
- Previous CS: 2022 CS Lombardia Trophy
- Next CS: 2022 CS Nepela Memorial

The 2022 CS Nebelhorn Trophy was held on September 21–24, 2022, in Oberstdorf, Germany. It was the third event of the 2022–23 ISU Challenger Series. Medals were awarded in men's singles, women's singles, pair skating, and ice dance.

== Entries ==
The International Skating Union published the list of entries on August 29, 2022.

Country	Men	Women	Pairs	Ice dance
Australia				Holly Harris / Jason Chan
Austria		Olga Mikutina; Stefanie Pesendorfer		
Belgium		Loena Hendrickx		
Canada	Keegan Messing; Roman Sadovsky	Madeline Schizas	Deanna Stellato-Dudek / Maxime Deschamps	Molly Lanaghan / Dmitre Razgulajevs; Carolane Soucisse / Shane Firus
Chile		Yae-Mia Neira		
Chinese Taipei		Ting Tzu-Han		
Croatia	Jari Kessler			
Czech Republic			Jelizaveta Žuková / Martin Bidař	
Estonia	Mihhail Selevko	Eva-Lotta Kiibus; Niina Petrõkina		
Finland	Makar Suntsev; Valtter Virtanen	Linnea Ceder		
France			Camille Kovalev / Pavel Kovalev; Océane Piegad / Denys Strekalin	Marie Dupayge / Thomas Nabais; Lou Terreaux / Noé Perron
Georgia			Anastasiia Metelkina / Daniil Parkman	
Germany	Nikita Starostin	Kristina Isaev	Alisa Efimova / Ruben Blommaert; Annika Hocke / Robert Kunkel	Charise Matthaei / Max Liebers
Great Britain				Lilah Fear / Lewis Gibson
Italy			Sara Conti / Niccolò Macii; Anna Valesi / Manuel Piazza	Elisabetta Leccardi / Mattia Dalla Torre
Japan	Kazuki Tomono		Miyu Yunoki / Shoya Ichihashi	
Lithuania				Allison Reed / Saulius Ambrulevičius
Netherlands		Lindsay van Zundert	Nika Osipova / Dmitry Epstein	
Poland	Kornel Witkowski			
South Korea	Cha Young-hyun; Lee Si-hyeong	Wi Seo-yeong; Yun Ah-sun		
Spain	Tomàs-Llorenç Guarino Sabaté			
Switzerland		Livia Kaiser		
Turkey	Başar Oktar; Burak Demirboğa			
Ukraine	Andrii Kokura; Ivan Shmuratko	Anastasia Gozhva	Sofiia Holichenko / Artem Darenskyi	Mariia Holubtsova / Kyryl Bielobrov
United States	Liam Kapeikis	Starr Andrews; Gracie Gold		Molly Cesanek / Yehor Yehorov; Lorraine McNamara / Anton Spiridonov

=== Changes to preliminary assignments ===
Date	Discipline	Withdrew	Added	Notes	Ref.
September 1	Pairs	(United States) Anastasiia Smirnova / Danylo Siianytsia	—		
September 5	Pairs	(United States) Katie McBeath / Nathan Bartholomay	—		
September 6	Ice dance	(Czech Republic) Natálie Taschlerová / Filip Taschler	—		
September 8	Ice dance	(Germany) Jennifer Janse van Rensburg / Benjamin Steffan	—	Injury (Janse van Rensburg)	
September 8	Women	(Switzerland) Alexia Paganini	—		
September 8	Pairs	(France) Coline Keriven / Tom Bouvart	—		
September 21	Men	(France) Corentin Spinar	—		
September 21	Men	(Italy) Matteo Nalbone	—		
September 21	Ice dance	(Germany) Lara Luft / Maximilian Pfisterer	—	Illness (Pfisterer)	

== Results ==
=== Men's singles ===
Rank	Skater	Nation	Total points	SP		FS	
1st place, gold medalist(s)	Keegan Messing	Canada	245.74	3	74.85	1	170.89
2nd place, silver medalist(s)	Lee Si-hyeong	South Korea	235.71	2	86.78	2	148.93
3rd place, bronze medalist(s)	Roman Sadovsky	Canada	222.74	1	89.57	5	133.17
4	Kazuki Tomono	Japan	210.77	11	64.97	3	145.80
5	Tomàs-Llorenç Guarino Sabaté	Spain	209.34	5	71.10	4	138.24
6	Jari Kessler	Croatia	197.99	4	72.97	7	125.02
7	Ivan Shmuratko	Ukraine	194.90	6	69.89	8	125.01
8	Liam Kapeikis	United States	191.72	8	67.48	9	124.24
9	Nikita Starostin	Germany	184.96	12	61.91	10	123.05
10	Cha Young-hyun	South Korea	183.09	14	53.94	6	129.15
11	Mihhail Selevko	Estonia	183.09	9	67.28	11	115.81
12	Valtter Virtanen	Finland	178.28	7	69.34	13	108.94
13	Makar Suntsev	Finland	176.09	13	60.43	12	115.66
14	Kornel Witkowski	Poland	162.86	10	66.33	15	96.53
15	Andrii Kokura	Ukraine	156.84	15	53.59	14	103.25

=== Women's singles ===
Rank	Skater	Nation	Total points	SP		FS	
1st place, gold medalist(s)	Loena Hendrickx	Belgium	208.05	1	76.19	2	131.86
2nd place, silver medalist(s)	Wi Seo-yeong	South Korea	193.25	3	61.31	1	131.94
3rd place, bronze medalist(s)	Eva-Lotta Kiibus	Estonia	165.21	10	50.94	3	114.27
4	Ting Tzu-Han	Chinese Taipei	162.42	11	49.92	4	112.50
5	Madeline Schizas	Canada	160.71	2	64.99	10	95.72
6	Starr Andrews	United States	156.60	7	53.31	6	103.29
7	Olga Mikutina	Austria	155.53	4	58.31	9	97.22
8	Stefanie Pesendorfer	Austria	154.31	9	52.78	7	101.53
9	Lindsay van Zundert	Netherlands	154.31	8	53.11	8	101.20
10	Linnea Ceder	Finland	152.81	5	57.43	11	95.38
11	Niina Petrõkina	Estonia	152.00	13	47.34	5	104.66
12	Gracie Gold	United States	138.89	15	45.08	12	93.81
13	Anastasia Gozhva	Ukraine	129.31	16	37.67	13	91.64
14	Livia Kaiser	Switzerland	128.34	14	47.21	14	81.13
15	Yae-Mia Neira	Chile	104.93	17	36.39	15	68.54
WD	Yun Ah-sun	South Korea	withdrew	6	56.94	withdrew from competition	
WD	Kristina Isaev	Germany	withdrew	12	49.73	withdrew from competition	

=== Pairs ===
Rank	Team	Nation	Total points	SP		FS	
1st place, gold medalist(s)	Deanna Stellato-Dudek / Maxime Deschamps	Canada	192.74	2	68.08	1	124.66
2nd place, silver medalist(s)	Alisa Efimova / Ruben Blommaert	Germany	186.17	3	67.05	2	119.12
3rd place, bronze medalist(s)	Annika Hocke / Robert Kunkel	Germany	184.47	1	69.13	3	115.34
4	Sara Conti / Niccolò Macii	Italy	177.87	4	64.85	4	113.02
5	Anastasiia Metelkina / Daniil Parkman	Georgia	165.44	5	62.15	5	103.29
6	Camille Kovalev / Pavel Kovalev	France	157.36	6	54.56	6	102.80
7	Anna Valesi / Manuel Piazza	Italy	150.96	8	52.07	7	98.89
8	Jelizaveta Žuková / Martin Bidař	Czech Republic	147.32	9	49.67	8	97.65
9	Nika Osipova / Dmitry Epstein	Netherlands	146.06	7	52.09	9	93.97
10	Miyu Yunoki / Shoya Ichihashi	Japan	140.46	11	48.09	10	92.37
11	Océane Piegad / Denys Strekalin	France	138.36	10	48.43	11	89.93
12	Sofiia Holichenko / Artem Darenskyi	Ukraine	124.86	12	44.07	12	80.79

=== Ice dance ===
Rank	Team	Nation	Total points	RD		FD	
1st place, gold medalist(s)	Lilah Fear / Lewis Gibson	Great Britain	206.60	1	85.50	1	120.80
2nd place, silver medalist(s)	Allison Reed / Saulius Ambrulevičius	Lithuania	185.41	2	78.98	2	106.43
3rd place, bronze medalist(s)	Carolane Soucisse / Shane Firus	Canada	176.35	3	73.23	3	103.12
4	Molly Lanaghan / Dmitre Razgulajevs	Canada	167.00	6	65.23	4	101.77
5	Lorraine McNamara / Anton Spiridonov	United States	166.05	4	69.64	5	96.41
6	Lou Terreaux / Noé Perron	France	153.66	5	66.18	9	87.48
7	Holly Harris / Jason Chan	Australia	152.66	7	62.04	8	90.62
8	Mariia Holubtsova / Kyryl Bielobrov	Ukraine	150.57	9	57.74	6	92.83
9	Elisabetta Leccardi / Mattia Dalla Torre	Italy	145.52	11	53.19	7	92.33
10	Molly Cesanek / Yehor Yehorov	United States	138.87	8	61.81	11	77.06
11	Charise Matthaei / Max Liebers	Germany	136.02	10	55.50	10	80.52
