= Raffaele Francesco Zich =

Italian figure skater

Personal information
- Born: 23 June 2006 (age 20) Hanoi, Vietnam
- Home town: Turin, Italy
- Height: 1.71 m (5 ft 7 1/2 in)

Figure skating career
- Country: Italy
- Discipline: Men's singles
- Coach: Stéphane Lambiel; Angelo Dolfini
- Skating club: Ice Club Torino
- Began skating: 2009

Raffaele Francesco Zich (born 23 June 2006) is an Italian figure skater. He is the 2022 JGP Poland I bronze medalist and 2022 European Youth Olympic silver medalist.

== Personal life ==
Zich was born 23 June 2006 in Hanoi, Vietnam, and resides in Turin, Italy. His grandfather, Rodolfo Zich, is the former rector of the Polytechnic University of Turin.

== Career ==
=== Early years ===
Zich began learning to skate in 2009. He became interested in the sport after accompanying his sister, Eleonora, to the ice rink. During his early years, he was coached by Claudia Masoero before eventually going on to train under Renata Lazzaroni and Edoardo De Bernadis at Ice Club Torino. He competed for two seasons in the advanced novice category, winning the Italian novice men's title in March 2018.

His junior international debut came in October 2019 at the 2019–20 ISU Junior Grand Prix event in Egna, Italy, where he twenty-first.

The COVID-19 pandemic led to the cancellation of many international events in the 2020–21 season. In April 2021, Zich won the Italian junior national title.

=== 2021–22 season ===
Zich competed in both the junior and senior ranks, making his senior international debut in October at the 2022 Trophée Métropole Nice Côte d'Azur. He finished fourth in the senior category in December at the 2022 Italian Championships.

He was assigned to the 2022 World Junior Championships, which took place in April in Tallinn, Estonia. He was ranked fifteenth in the short and thirteenth in the free skate and finished fifteenth overall.

=== 2022–23 season ===
In October, Zich competed at consecutive 2022–23 ISU Junior Grand Prix events in Gdańsk, Poland. He won bronze at his first assignment and placed thirteenth the following week. Going on to compete on the 2022–23 ISU Challenger Series, Zich placed eleventh at the 2022 CS Ice Challenge and fifteenth at the 2022 CS Warsaw Cup.

In December, Zich placed sixth at the 2023 Italian Championships. He subsequently won the silver medal at the 2023 Sofia Trophy. Selected to compete at the 2023 World Junior Championships in Calgary, Alberta, Canada, Zich finished the event in twenty-second place.

=== 2023–24 season ===
Zich started the season by winning gold on the junior level at the 2023 Latvia Trophy. He then went on to place fourth at the 2024 Italian Championships.

Selected to compete at the 2024 Winter Youth Olympics in Gangneung, South Korea, Zich finished the event in sixth place. Two weeks following that event, Zich won the silver medal on the junior level at the 2024 Tallink Hotels Cup. He then finished the season by placing twenty-ninth at the 2024 World Junior Championships in Taipei, Taiwan.

=== 2024–25 season ===
Zich began the season by 2024 JGP Slovenia, where he finished in tenth place. Going on to compete at the 2024 CS Tallinn Trophy, Zich placed thirteenth at that event. The following month, he finished sixth at the 2025 Italian Championships. Selected to compete at the

In late January, it was announced that Zich had left longtime coaches Renata Lazzaroni and Edoardo De Bernadis to train under Stéphane Lambiel and Angelo Dolfini in Champéry, Switzerland. That same month, he competed at the 2025 Winter World University Games in Turin, Italy, where he placed thirteenth. He subsequently won the bronze medal at the 2025 Bavarian Open.

Selected to compete at the 2025 World Junior Championships in Debrecen, Hungary, Zich placed twenty-first.

=== 2025–26 season ===
Although assigned to compete at the 2025 CS Denis Ten Memorial Challenge, Zich withdrew from the event on the day of the short program.

=== 2026–27 season ===
Zich opened the new season placing 16th at the 2026 Kinoshita Group Cup.

== Programs ==
Season	Short program	Free skating	Exhibition
2024–25	Anybody Seen My Baby?; Living in a Ghost Town by The Rolling Stones choreo. by Edoardo De Bernardis	Clouds, The Mind of the (Re)Wind by Ezio Bosso choreo. by Stéphane Lambiel; The Silence of the Lambs (Main Title) (from The Silence of the Lambs) by Howard Shore & Munich Symphony Orchestra; Bad Moon Rising by Mourning Ritual ft. Peter Dreimanis; Dear Clarice (from Hannibal) by Anthony Hopkins & Hans Zimmer; Apéritif (from Hannibal) by Brian Reitzell choreo. by Edoardo De Bernardis	
2023–24	Autumn Moon by Eternal Eclipse	The Silence of the Lambs (Main Title) (from The Silence of the Lambs) by Howard Shore & Munich Symphony Orchestra; Bad Moon Rising by Mourning Ritual ft. Peter Dreimanis; Dear Clarice (from Hannibal) by Anthony Hopkins & Hans Zimmer; Apéritif (from Hannibal) by Brian Reitzell choreo. by Edoardo De Bernardis	
2022–23	Autumn Moon by Eternal Eclipse	Deceit and Betrayal by Audiomachine; Summer 2 by Max Richter, Daniel Hope choreo. by Edoardo De Bernardis; Swing Shift by Ahn Trio	New Girl by FINNEAS; Good News by Apashe choreo. by Edoardo De Bernardis
2021–22	Piano Concerto Trailerized by Michael Afanasyev choreo. by Edoardo De Bernardis	So Close by Ólafur Arnalds; I Found by Amber Run; Land Of All by Woodkid choreo. by Edoardo De Bernardis	
2019–20	I Feel Like I'm Drowning by Two Feet choreo. by Alessandro Piccoli, Luca Mantovani	Grand Guignol by Bajofondo; Assassin's Tango (from Mr. & Mrs. Smith) by John Powell choreo. by Alessandro Piccoli, Luca Mantovani	

== Competitive highlights ==
- JGP – Event of the ISU Junior Grand Prix Series
- CS – Event of the ISU Challenger Series
- TBD – Assigned
- WD – Withdrew from competition

Competition placements at senior level
Season	2021–22	2022–23	2023–24	2024–25	2025–26	2026–27
Italian Championships	4th	6th	4th	6th	4th	
CS Denis Ten Memorial					WD	
CS Golden Spin of Zagreb	21st					
CS Ice Challenge	19th	11th				
CS Tallinn Trophy				13th		
CS Warsaw Cup	18th	15th				
CS Kinoshita Group Cup						16th
CS Trialeti Trophy						8th
Sofia Trophy		2nd				
Tallink Hotels Cup					4th	
Trophée Métropole Nice	13th					
Winter University Games				13th		
Coupe du Printemps					6th	
Daugava Open Cup				2nd		

Competition placements at junior level
Season	2019–20	2020–21	2021–22	2022–23	2023–24	2024–25
Winter Youth Olympics					6th	
World Junior Championships			15th	22nd	29th	21st
Italian Championships	6th	1st				
JGP Italy	21st					
JGP Poland I				3rd		
JGP Poland II				13th		
JGP Slovenia			14th			10th
Challenge Cup	7th					
Egna Trophy		3rd				
European Youth Olympic Festival			2nd			
Golden Bear of Zagreb	6th					
Latvia Trophy					1st	
NRW Trophy			2nd			
Skate Celje	2nd					
Sofia Trophy	6th					
Tallink Hotels Cup					2nd	

== Detailed results ==
ISU personal best scores in the +5/-5 GOE System
Segment	Type	Score	Event
Total	TSS	200.73	2022 JGP Poland I
Short program	TSS	70.02	2022 JGP Poland I
Short program	TES	36.11	2022 JGP Poland I
Short program	PCS	34.91	2022 JGP Poland I
Free skating	TSS	131.53	2022 CS Ice Challenge
Free skating	TES	63.66	2022 CS Warsaw Cup
Free skating	PCS	72.10	2022 JGP Poland I

=== Senior level ===
Results in the 2021–22 season
Date	Event	SP		FS		Total	
Date	Event	P	Score	P	Score	P	Score
Oct 20–24, 2021	(France) 2021 Trophée Métropole Nice Côte d'Azur	11	58.25	15	100.17	13	158.42
Nov 11–14, 2021	2021 CS Cup of Austria	17	64.69	19	118.35	19	183.04
Nov 17–20, 2021	(Poland) 2021 CS Warsaw Cup	23	61.96	16	127.57	18	189.53
Dec 4–5, 2021	(Italy) 2022 Italian Championships	4	63.72	4	134.23	4	197.95
Dec 7–11, 2021	(Croatia) 2021 CS Golden Spin of Zagreb	19	64.21	22	120.97	21	185.18

Results in the 2022–23 season
Date	Event	SP		FS		Total	
Date	Event	P	Score	P	Score	P	Score
Nov 9–13, 2022	(Austria) 2022 CS Ice Challenge	10	61.90	10	131.53	11	193.43
Nov 17–20, 2022	(Poland) 2022 CS Warsaw Cup	18	62.20	13	128.43	15	190.63
Dec 15–18, 2022	(Italy) 2023 Italian Championships	6	62.92	6	104.68	6	167.60
Feb 3–7, 2023	(Bulgaria) 2023 Sofia Trophy	1	71.36	2	125.60	2	196.96

Results in the 2023–24 season
Date	Event	SP		FS		Total	
Date	Event	P	Score	P	Score	P	Score
Dec 22–23, 2023	(Italy) 2024 Italian Championships	4	67.39	4	128.21	4	195.60

Results in the 2024-25 season
Date	Event	SP		FS		Total	
Date	Event	P	Score	P	Score	P	Score
Nov 11-17, 2024	(Estonia) 2024 CS Tallinn Trophy	12	64.73	13	124.69	13	189.42
Dec 19–21, 2024	(Italy) 2025 Italian Championships	6	73.62	6	120.32	6	193.94
Jan 16–18, 2025	(Italy) 2025 Winter World University Games	9	69.66	12	129.50	13	199.16
Mar 14-16, 2025	(Latvia) 2025 Daugava Open Cup	1	71.92	2	115.62	2	187.54

Results in the 2025-26 season
Date	Event	SP		FS		Total	
Date	Event	P	Score	P	Score	P	Score
Dec 17-20, 2025	(Italy) 2026 Italian Championships	4	65.61	4	127.98	4	193.59
Feb 19-22, 2026	(Estonia) 2026 Tallink Hotels Cup	5	60.01	5	109.23	4	169.24
Mar 13–15, 2026	(Luxembourg) 2026 Coupe du Printemps	6	57.91	6	109.33	6	167.24

Results in the 2026–27 season
Date	Event	SP		FS		Total	
Date	Event	P	Score	P	Score	P	Score
Sept 4–6, 2026	(Japan) 2026 Kinoshita Group Cup	16	55.73	16	96.43	16	152.16
Oct 1–4, 2026	(Georgia (country)) 2026 CS Trialeti Trophy	7	69.79	9	106.03	8	175.82

=== Junior level ===
Results in the 2019–20 season
Date	Event	SP		FS		Total	
Date	Event	P	Score	P	Score	P	Score
Oct 2–5, 2019	2019 JGP Italy	21	45.56	21	82.99	21	128.55
Oct 24–27, 2019	(Croatia) 2019 Golden Bear of Zagreb	4	46.55	6	61.96	6	108.51
Nov 22–24, 2019	(Slovenia) 2019 Skate Celje	1	48.67	3	89.71	2	138.38
Dec 12–15, 2019	(Italy) 2020 Italian Championships (Junior)	5	47.55	6	81.17	6	128.72
Feb 12–18, 2020	(Bulgaria) 2020 Sofia Trophy	5	50.87	6	88.59	6	139.46
Feb 20–23, 2020	(Netherlands) 2020 International Challenge Cup	7	53.22	7	96.92	7	150.14

Results in the 2020–21 season
Date	Event	SP		FS		Total	
Date	Event	P	Score	P	Score	P	Score
Apr 9–11, 2021	(Italy) 2021 Italian Championships (Junior)	2	54.21	1	123.27	1	177.48
Apr 29 – May 2, 2021	(Italy) 2021 Egna Spring Trophy	2	63.66	3	111.30	3	174.96

Results in the 2021–22 season
Date	Event	SP		FS		Total	
Date	Event	P	Score	P	Score	P	Score
Sep 22–25, 2021	2021 JGP Slovenia	15	46.16	11	87.36	14	133.52
Nov 4–7, 2021	(Germany) 2021 NRW Trophy	2	56.91	2	104.92	2	161.83
Mar 20–25, 2022	(Finland) 2022 European Youth Olympic Festival	2	69.08	3	118.75	2	187.83
Apr 13–17, 2022	(Estonia) 2022 World Junior Championships	15	65.19	13	130.15	15	195.34

Results in the 2022–23 season
Date	Event	SP		FS		Total	
Date	Event	P	Score	P	Score	P	Score
Sep 28 – Oct 1, 2022	2022 JGP Poland I	3	70.02	5	130.71	3	200.73
Oct 5–8, 2022	2022 JGP Poland II	18	51.85	6	119.37	13	171.22
Feb 27 – Mar 5, 2023	(Canada) 2023 World Junior Championships	18	62.48	22	102.71	22	165.19

Results in the 2023–24 season
Date	Event	SP		FS		Total	
Date	Event	P	Score	P	Score	P	Score
Dec 8–10, 2023	2023 Latvia Trophy	1	71.57	1	125.16	1	196.73
Jan 27 – Feb 1, 2024	(South Korea) 2024 Winter Youth Olympics	6	66.05	7	123.79	6	189.84
Feb 15–18, 2024	(Estonia) 2024 Tallink Hotels Cup	1	77.59	2	133.79	2	211.38
Feb 26 – Mar 3, 2024	(Taiwan) 2024 World Junior Championships	29	59.48	—N/a	—N/a	29	59.48

Results in the 2024-25 season
Date	Event	SP		FS		Total	
Date	Event	P	Score	P	Score	P	Score
Oct 2-5, 2024	2024 JGP Slovenia	11	64.67	9	125.02	10	189.69
Feb 25 – Mar 2, 2025	(Hungary) 2025 World Junior Championships	13	69.53	23	97.46	21	166.99
