= 2022 CS Ice Challenge =

Figure skating competition

2022 CS Icechallenge
- Type: ISU Challenger Series
- Date: November 9 – 13
- Season: 2022–23
- Location: Graz, Austria
- Host: Skate Austria
- Venue: Merkur Eisstadion

Champions
- Men's singles: (United States) Liam Kapeikis
- Women's singles: (Italy) Anna Pezzetta
- Ice dance: (United States) Emily Bratti / Ian Somerville
- Previous: 2021 CS Cup of Austria
- Previous CS: 2022 CS Denis Ten Memorial Challenge
- Next CS: 2022 CS Warsaw Cup

The 2022 CS Ice Challenge was held on November 9–13, 2022, in Graz, Austria. It was the eighth event of the 2022–23 ISU Challenger Series. Medals were awarded in men's singles, women's singles, and ice dance.

== Entries ==
The International Skating Union published the list of entries on October 19, 2022.

Country	Men	Women	Ice dance
Austria	Luc Maierhofer; Maurizio Zandron	Stefanie Pesendorfer; Emily Saari	
Canada		Sara-Maude Dupuis; Justine Miclette; Kaiya Ruiter	Lily Hensen / Nathan Lickers
Chile		Yae-Mia Neira	
Croatia	Charles Henry Katanović	Hana Cvijanović	
Czech Republic		Barbora Vránková	
Estonia		Nataly Langerbaur	
Finland		Jenni Saarinen	
France	Landry Le May; François Pitot; Ian Vauclin	Lorine Schild	Natacha Lagouge / Arnaud Caffa; Elise Montaner / Linus Colmor Jepsen; Lou Terreaux / Noé Perron
Germany	Nikita Starostin; Louis Weissert		
Great Britain		Kristen Spours	
Hong Kong		Cheuk Ka Kahlen Cheung; Hiu Yau Chow	
Hungary	Mózes József Berei	Júlia Láng; Katinka Anna Zsembery	
Italy	Matteo Nalbone; Raffaele Francesco Zich	Anna Pezzetta; Marina Piredda	Leia Dozzi / Pietro Papetti
Kazakhstan			Gaukhar Nauryzova / Boyisangur Datiev
Monaco	Davide Lewton Brain		
Mongolia		Maral-Erdene Gansukh	
Netherlands			Hanna Jakucs / Alessio Galli; Chelsea Verhaegh / Sherim van Geffen
New Zealand			Charlotte Lafond-Fournier / Richard Kang-in Kam
Norway		Frida Turiddotter Berge; Linnea Kilsand	
Philippines	Edrian Paul Celestino		
Poland		Karolina Białas	
South Korea	Cha Young-hyun	Choi Da-bin; Kim Min-chae; Yun Ah-sun	
Slovenia	David Sedej		
Spain	Euken Alberdi; Pablo Garcia; Tomàs-Llorenç Guarino Sabaté		
Sweden	Nikolaj Majorov; Andreas Nordebäck	Emelie Ling	
Switzerland	Naoki Rossi; Nurullah Sahaka	Livia Kaiser; Kimmy Repond	
United States	William Annis; Liam Kapeikis	Gracie Gold; Clare Seo	Emily Bratti / Ian Somerville; Molly Cesanek / Yehor Yehorov

=== Changes to preliminary assignments ===
Date	Discipline	Withdrew	Added	Ref.
October 20	Men	—	(Hong Kong) Heung Lai Zhao	
October 25	Men	(Hong Kong) Heung Lai Zhao	—	
October 25	Men	(Hong Kong) Kwun Hung Leung	—	
October 25	Ice dance	—	(United States) Emily Bratti / Ian Somerville	
October 26	Men	(France) Corentin Spinar	(France) François Pitot	
October 26	Women	(Slovakia) Alexandra Michaela Filcová	—	
November 2	Ice dance	(Hungary) Lucy Hancock / Ilias Fourati	—	
November 2	Ice dance	(Hungary) Mariia Ignateva / Danijil Szemko	—	
November 8	Women	(Finland) Linnea Ceder	—	
November 8	Women	(Hungary) Regina Schermann	—	
November 8	Women	(Sweden) Josefin Taljegård	—	
November 8	Ice dance	(Australia) Holly Harris / Jason Chan	—	
November 8	Ice dance	(Italy) Elisabetta Leccardi / Mattia Dalla Torre	—	
November 9	Men	(Hungary) Aleksandr Vlasenko	—	
November 9	Women	(Croatia) Dora Hus	—	

== Results ==
=== Men's singles ===
Rank	Skater	Nation	Total points	SP		FS	
1st place, gold medalist(s)	Liam Kapeikis	United States	223.02	1	76.46	2	146.56
2nd place, silver medalist(s)	Andreas Nordebäck	Sweden	218.25	2	75.24	4	143.01
3rd place, bronze medalist(s)	Nikita Starostin	Germany	217.04	4	71.96	3	145.08
4	Tomàs-Llorenç Guarino Sabaté	Spain	216.05	3	74.19	5	141.86
5	François Pitot	France	212.25	15	59.05	1	153.20
6	Davide Lewton Brain	Monaco	203.16	5	70.31	7	132.85
7	Naoki Rossi	Switzerland	197.59	6	69.02	11	128.57
8	Nikolaj Majorov	Sweden	197.53	7	65.72	9	131.81
9	Maurizio Zandron	Austria	197.32	8	65.25	8	132.07
10	Cha Young-hyun	South Korea	196.01	14	59.27	6	136.74
11	Raffaele Francesco Zich	Italy	193.43	10	61.90	10	131.53
12	Luc Maierhofer	Austria	184.01	12	61.34	12	122.67
13	Landry Le May	France	178.76	9	62.98	14	115.78
14	Nurullah Sahaka	Switzerland	176.79	11	61.60	15	115.19
15	Pablo Garcia	Spain	173.88	17	56.22	13	117.66
16	Edrian Paul Celestino	Philippines	171.91	13	60.02	17	111.89
17	Ian Vauclin	France	164.92	16	56.54	18	108.38
18	William Annis	United States	162.39	21	48.63	16	113.76
19	Euken Alberdi	Spain	146.15	19	50.01	20	96.14
20	David Sedej	Slovenia	142.95	23	44.68	19	98.27
21	Charles Henry Katanović	Croatia	141.66	22	47.92	21	93.74
22	Mózes József Berei	Hungary	138.93	18	54.61	22	84.32
23	Louis Weissert	Germany	130.31	20	48.72	23	81.59
WD	Matteo Nalbone	Italy	withdrew from competition				

=== Women's singles ===
Rank	Skater	Nation	Total points	SP		FS	
1st place, gold medalist(s)	Anna Pezzetta	Italy	174.49	3	60.05	3	114.44
2nd place, silver medalist(s)	Kaiya Ruiter	Canada	172.42	6	55.36	1	117.06
3rd place, bronze medalist(s)	Kimmy Repond	Switzerland	169.35	9	53.22	2	116.13
4	Lorine Schild	France	168.30	5	57.05	5	111.25
5	Justine Miclette	Canada	167.87	2	60.86	6	107.01
6	Yun Ah-sun	South Korea	163.82	1	61.83	9	101.99
7	Livia Kaiser	Switzerland	161.59	4	58.25	7	103.34
8	Clare Seo	United States	158.49	16	46.73	4	111.76
9	Gracie Gold	United States	154.22	7	55.00	12	99.22
10	Stefanie Pesendorfer	Austria	154.00	8	53.92	11	100.08
11	Sara-Maude Dupuis	Canada	154.00	13	50.49	8	103.28
12	Jenni Saarinen	Finland	153.28	11	51.60	10	101.68
13	Kristen Spours	Great Britain	147.78	14	49.81	13	97.97
14	Nataly Langerbaur	Estonia	143.77	12	51.19	14	92.58
15	Emily Saari	Austria	138.98	15	48.89	15	90.99
16	Emelie Ling	Sweden	135.62	18	45.77	17	89.85
17	Júlia Láng	Hungary	134.17	20	44.25	16	89.92
18	Choi Da-bin	South Korea	132.66	19	44.78	18	87.88
19	Kim Min-chae	South Korea	130.28	10	52.45	23	77.83
20	Barbora Vránková	Czech Republic	130.02	21	43.41	19	86.61
21	Linnea Kilsand	Norway	128.43	17	46.02	20	82.41
22	Katinka Anna Zsembery	Hungary	121.85	22	43.32	21	78.53
23	Cheuk Ka Kahlen Cheung	Hong Kong	120.36	23	42.10	22	78.26
24	Karolina Białas	Poland	113.57	24	38.03	24	75.54
25	Hiu Yau Chow	Hong Kong	104.91	26	36.06	26	68.85
26	Hana Cvijanović	Croatia	104.26	25	36.74	27	67.52
27	Frida Turiddotter Berge	Norway	103.10	28	29.78	25	73.32
28	Yae-Mia Neira	Chile	94.12	27	32.93	28	61.19
29	Maral-Erdene Gansukh	Mongolia	74.51	29	24.97	29	49.54
WD	Marina Piredda	Italy	withdrew from competition				

=== Ice dance ===
Rank	Team	Nation	Total points	RD		FD	
1st place, gold medalist(s)	Emily Bratti / Ian Somerville	United States	179.07	1	71.61	1	107.46
2nd place, silver medalist(s)	Natacha Lagouge / Arnaud Caffa	France	160.43	3	61.44	2	98.99
3rd place, bronze medalist(s)	Lily Hensen / Nathan Lickers	Canada	155.30	2	63.73	5	91.57
4	Lou Terreaux / Noé Perron	France	154.48	4	61.10	4	93.38
5	Molly Cesanek / Yehor Yehorov	United States	153.03	5	58.43	3	94.60
6	Leia Dozzi / Pietro Papetti	Italy	149.28	6	58.42	6	90.86
7	Charlotte Lafond-Fournier / Richard Kang-in Kam	New Zealand	141.08	7	53.16	7	87.92
8	Elise Montaner / Linus Colmor Jepsen	France	133.43	8	53.04	8	80.39
9	Hanna Jakucs / Alessio Galli	Netherlands	125.67	9	50.39	9	75.28
10	Chelsea Verhaegh / Sherim van Geffen	Netherlands	120.04	10	48.36	10	71.68
11	Gaukhar Nauryzova / Boyisangur Datiev	Kazakhstan	114.56	11	46.35	11	68.21
