= Figure skating at the 2025 Winter World University Games =

Figure skating competition

Figure skating at the Torino 2025 FISU World University Games
- Figure skating pictogram
- Venue: Palavela
- Dates: January 16–18, 2025
- Competitors: 88 from 28 nations

Figure skating at the 2025 Winter World University Games was held on January 16–18 at the Palavela in Turin, Italy. Medals were awarded in men's singles, women's singles and ice dance.

== Regulations ==
Skaters who were born between 1 January 2000 and 31 December 2007 are eligible to compete at the Winter World University Games if they are registered as proceeding towards a degree or diploma at a university or similar institute, or obtained their academic degree or diploma in the year preceding the event.

In ice dance, only one partner must be a citizen of the country for which they are competing. Each nation may send a maximum of three entries per discipline.

== Medalists ==
Discipline	Gold	Silver	Bronze
Men	Yuma Kagiyama; Japan	Daniel Grassl; Italy	Cha Jun-hwan; South Korea
Women	Rion Sumiyoshi; Japan	Mone Chiba; Japan	Sofia Samodelkina; Kazakhstan
Ice dance	Spain; Sofía Val; Asaf Kazimov	France; Lou Terreaux; Noé Perron	Italy; Giulia Isabella Paolino; Andrea Tuba

== Entries ==
Nations began announcing their entries in December 2024. The International University Sports Federation announced the official roster of entries on 11 January 2025.

Entries
Country	Men	Women	Ice dance
Argentina	—N/a	Michelle Dicicco	—N/a
Armenia	Fedor Chitipakhovian	—N/a	Kristina Dobroserdova; Alessandro Pellegrini
Brazil	Arthur Alcorte	—N/a	
Croatia	—N/a	Hana Cvijanović	—N/a
Czech Republic	Filip Ščerba	Michaela Vrašťáková	—N/a
Estonia	Arlet Levandi	Nataly Langerbaur	—N/a
Estonia	Jegor Martšenko	Kristina Lisovskaja	—N/a
Finland	Makar Suntsev	Janna Jyrkinen	—N/a
France	Samy Hammi	Clémence Mayindu	Eva Bernard; Amédeo Bonetto
France	Xavier Vauclin	—N/a	Lou Terreaux; Noé Perron
Hong Kong	Cheung Chiu Hei	Cheuk Ka Kahlen Cheung	—N/a
Hong Kong	Heung Lai Jarke Zhao	Chow Hiu Yau	—N/a
Hungary	Aleksandr Vlasenko	Regina Schermann	Emese Csiszér; Mark Shapiro
Italy	Corey Circelli	Lara Naki Gutmann	Carlotta Argentieri; Francesco Riva
Italy	Daniel Grassl	Marina Piredda	Giulia Isabella Paolino; Andrea Tuba
Italy	Raffaele Francesco Zich	Ginevra Lavinia Negrello	—N/a
Japan	Yuma Kagiyama	Mone Chiba	—N/a
Japan	Shun Sato	Rion Sumiyoshi	—N/a
Japan	Sōta Yamamoto	Hana Yoshida	—N/a
Kazakhstan	Dias Jirenbayev	Sofia Samodelkina	—N/a
Kazakhstan	Nikita Krivosheyev	—N/a	—N/a
Kazakhstan	Mikhail Shaidorov	—N/a	—N/a
Latvia	—N/a	Anastasija Konga	—N/a
Lithuania	—N/a	Jogailė Aglinskytė	—N/a
Malaysia	Ze Zeng Fang	—N/a	
Mexico	—N/a	Andrea Montesinos Cantú	—N/a
Mongolia	—N/a	Misheel Otgonbaatar	—N/a
Netherlands	—N/a	Roos Van Der Pas	—N/a
Norway	—N/a	Linnea Kilsand	—N/a
Norway	—N/a	Kaia Kleven	—N/a
Philippines	—N/a	Skye Chua	—N/a
Poland	Jakub Lofek	Karolina Białas	Sofia Dovhal; Wiktor Kulesza
Poland	—N/a	Laura Szczęsna	—N/a
Slovenia	David Sedej	—N/a	
South Korea	Cha Jun-hwan	Choi Da-bin	—N/a
South Korea	Cha Young-hyun	Wi Seo-yeong	—N/a
South Korea	Lee Si-hyeong	—N/a	—N/a
Spain	Euken Alberdi Martínez	Celia Vandhana Garnacho	Philomène Sabourin; Raúl Bermejo
Spain	Iker Oyarzábal Albas	Nuria Rodriguez Serrano	Sofía Val; Asaf Kazimov
Sweden	Jonathan Egyptson	Lovisa Aav	Emma Kivioja; Erik Pellnor
Sweden	Gabriel Folkesson	—N/a	—N/a
Turkey	Başar Oktar	Ceren Karaş	—N/a
Ukraine	Kyrylo Marsak	Anastasia Gozhva	Mariia Pinchuk; Mykyta Pogorielov

=== Changes to preliminary assignments ===
Discipline	Withdrew		Added		Notes	Ref.
Discipline	Date	Skater(s)	Date	Skater(s)	Notes	Ref.
Men	January 7	(Japan); Kao Miura	January 7	(Japan); Sōta Yamamoto	Injury	
Women	January 10	(South Korea); Kim Ye-lim	—N/a			
Men	January 13	(Austria); Anton Skoficz	—N/a			
Men	January 16	(Germany); Kai Jagoda	—N/a			

== Results ==
=== Men's singles ===
Men's results
Rank	Skater	Nation	Total	SP		FS	
1st place, gold medalist(s)	Yuma Kagiyama	Japan	289.04	1	106.82	3	182.22
2nd place, silver medalist(s)	Daniel Grassl	Italy	280.56	3	93.82	1	186.74
3rd place, bronze medalist(s)	Cha Jun-hwan	South Korea	264.94	5	82.40	2	182.54
4	Mikhail Shaidorov	Kazakhstan	260.15	4	91.79	4	168.36
5	Shun Sato	Japan	248.50	2	96.30	6	152.20
6	Sōta Yamamoto	Japan	242.23	6	78.81	5	163.42
7	Corey Circelli	Italy	211.16	8	70.48	7	140.68
8	Samy Hammi	France	209.86	10	69.30	8	140.56
9	Lee Si-hyeong	South Korea	203.10	7	73.60	13	129.50
10	Arlet Levandi	Estonia	202.41	15	63.29	9	139.12
11	Aleksandr Vlasenko	Hungary	202.41	12	68.87	10	133.54
12	Cha Young-hyun	South Korea	201.34	11	69.24	11	132.10
13	Raffaele Francesco Zich	Italy	199.16	9	69.66	12	129.50
14	Dias Jirenbayev	Kazakhstan	186.09	17	62.28	14	123.81
15	Euken Alberdi	Spain	183.35	13	64.25	15	119.10
16	Makar Suntsev	Finland	178.72	19	61.20	16	117.52
17	Nikita Krivosheyev	Kazakhstan	176.72	16	62.36	18	114.00
18	David Sedej	Slovenia	175.74	18	61.85	19	113.89
19	Xavier Vauclin	France	173.64	20	59.82	20	113.82
20	Filip Ščerba	Czech Republic	169.96	24	55.77	17	114.19
21	Gabriel Folkesson	Sweden	169.37	14	64.24	21	105.13
22	Cheung Chiu Hei	Hong Kong	163.82	21	59.55	22	104.27
23	Jegor Martšenko	Estonia	154.58	23	55.88	23	98.70
24	Başar Oktar	Turkey	128.58	22	56.44	24	72.14
25	Kyrylo Marsak	Ukraine	55.58	25	55.58	Did not advance to free skate	
26	Fedor Chitipakhovian	Armenia	55.42	26	55.42	Did not advance to free skate	
27	Jakub Lofek	Poland	54.44	27	54.44	Did not advance to free skate	
28	Ze Zeng Fang	Malaysia	54.14	28	54.14	Did not advance to free skate	
29	Jonathan Egyptson	Sweden	52.21	29	52.21	Did not advance to free skate	
30	Iker Oyarzábal Albas	Spain	51.10	30	51.10	Did not advance to free skate	
31	Zhao Heung Lai Jarke	Hong Kong	50.54	31	50.54	Did not advance to free skate	
32	Arthur Alcorte	Brazil	42.63	32	42.63	Did not advance to free skate	

=== Women's singles ===
Women's results
Rank	Skater	Nation	Total	SP		FS	
1st place, gold medalist(s)	Rion Sumiyoshi	Japan	204.29	3	65.89	1	138.40
2nd place, silver medalist(s)	Mone Chiba	Japan	203.85	1	72.00	2	131.85
3rd place, bronze medalist(s)	Sofia Samodelkina	Kazakhstan	190.96	2	66.43	4	124.53
4	Hana Yoshida	Japan	187.43	5	60.48	3	126.95
5	Lara Naki Gutmann	Italy	169.25	4	61.31	7	107.94
6	Janna Jyrkinen	Finland	163.33	6	55.07	6	108.26
7	Ginevra Lavinia Negrello	Italy	158.10	7	53.27	8	104.83
8	Marina Piredda	Italy	154.46	24	40.31	5	114.15
9	Anastasija Konga	Latvia	150.60	14	47.95	9	102.65
10	Linnea Kilsand	Norway	147.84	8	52.97	12	94.87
11	Choi Da-bin	South Korea	147.31	13	48.82	10	98.49
12	Wi Seo-yeong	South Korea	147.11	12	50.10	11	97.01
13	Laura Szczęsna	Poland	143.78	10	51.33	14	92.45
14	Kristina Lisovskaja	Estonia	142.29	9	51.59	17	90.70
15	Karolina Białas	Poland	140.55	16	47.11	13	93.44
16	Nataly Langerbaur	Estonia	137.60	17	46.35	15	91.25
17	Lovisa Aav	Sweden	135.32	15	47.68	19	87.64
18	Michaela Vrašťáková	Czech Republic	134.42	18	44.18	18	90.24
19	Anastasia Gozhva	Ukraine	134.37	19	43.52	16	90.85
20	Jogailė Aglinskytė	Lithuania	132.78	11	50.40	21	82.38
21	Regina Schermann	Hungary	126.10	20	42.06	20	84.04
22	Nuria Rodriguez Serrano	Spain	116.59	22	41.83	22	74.76
23	Hana Cvijanović	Croatia	108.73	23	40.32	23	68.41
24	Kaia Kleven	Norway	103.99	21	41.95	24	62.04
25	Andrea Montesinos Cantú	Mexico	38.07	25	38.07	Did not advance to free skate	
26	Cheung Cheuk Ka Kahlen	Hong Kong	36.48	26	36.48	Did not advance to free skate	
27	Clémence Mayindu	France	35.05	27	35.05	Did not advance to free skate	
28	Roos Van Der Pas	Netherlands	34.93	28	34.93	Did not advance to free skate	
29	Celia Vandhana Garnacho	Spain	34.05	29	34.05	Did not advance to free skate	
30	Ceren Karaş	Turkey	33.99	30	33.99	Did not advance to free skate	
31	Chow Hiu Yau	Hong Kong	31.71	31	31.71	Did not advance to free skate	
32	Skye Chua	Philippines	26.69	32	26.69	Did not advance to free skate	
33	Michelle Di Cicco	Argentina	23.75	33	23.75	Did not advance to free skate	
34	Misheel Otgonbaatar	Mongolia	18.91	34	18.91	Did not advance to free skate	

=== Ice dance ===
Ice dance results
Rank	Team	Nation	Total	RD		FD	
1st place, gold medalist(s)	Sofía Val; Asaf Kazimov	Spain	172.77	1	66.42	1	106.35
2nd place, silver medalist(s)	Lou Terreaux; Noé Perron	France	168.60	3	65.17	2	103.43
3rd place, bronze medalist(s)	Giulia Isabella Paolino; Andrea Tuba	Italy	166.85	2	65.84	3	101.01
4	Mariia Pinchuk; Mykyta Pogorielov	Ukraine	155.52	4	61.39	4	94.13
5	Carlotte Argentieri; Francesco Riva	Italy	148.51	5	55.41	5	93.10
6	Emese Csiszér; Mark Shapiro	Hungary	138.64	6	54.20	7	84.44
7	Philomène Sabourin; Raúl Bermejo	Spain	137.47	8	52.62	6	84.85
8	Eva Bernard; Amédeo Bonetto	France	135.74	10	51.55	8	84.19
9	Emma Kivioja; Erik Pellnor	Sweden	130.32	9	52.24	10	78.08
10	Kristina Dobroserdova; Alessandro Pellegrini	Armenia	129.56	11	51.28	9	78.28
11	Sofia Dovhal; Wiktor Kulesza	Poland	126.93	7	52.65	11	74.28
