= 2024 CS Tallinn Trophy =

International figure skating competition

- Type: ISU Challenger Series
- Date: November 12 – 17
- Season: 2024–25
- Location: Tallinn, Estonia
- Host: Estonian Skating Union
- Venue: Tondiraba Ice Hall

Champions
- Men's singles: (United States) Jacob Sanchez
- Women's singles: (Belgium) Nina Pinzarrone
- Ice dance: (France) Evgeniia Lopareva and Geoffrey Brissaud
- Previous CS: 2024 CS Nepela Memorial
- Next CS: 2024 CS Warsaw Cup

The 2024 CS Tallinn Trophy was held on November 12–17, 2024, in Tallinn, Estonia, as a part of the 2024–25 ISU Challenger Series. Medals were awarded in men's singles, women's singles, and ice dance.

== Entries ==
The International Skating Union published the list of entries on October 14, 2024.

Country	Men	Women	Ice dance
Australia	Douglas Gerber	—N/a	Holly Harris; Jason Chan
Belgium	—N/a	Jade Hovine	—N/a
Belgium	—N/a	Nina Pinzarrone	—N/a
Canada	Roman Sadovsky	Sara-Maude Dupuis	Alicia Fabbri; Paul Ayer
Canada	—N/a		Lily Hensen; Nathan Lickers
Cyprus	—N/a	Marilena Kitromilis	—N/a
Czech Republic	—N/a		Kateřina Mrázková; Daniel Mrázek
Estonia	Arlet Levandi	Martaliis Kuslap	—N/a
Estonia	Mihhail Selevko	Nataly Langerbaur	—N/a
Estonia	—N/a	Olesja Leonova	—N/a
Estonia	—N/a	Karoliine Raudsepp	—N/a
Finland	Arttu Juusola	Linnea Ceder	—N/a
Finland	Matias Lindfors	Oona Ounasvuori	—N/a
Finland	—N/a	Selma Valitalo	—N/a
France	Samy Hammi	Léa Serna	Evgeniia Lopareva; Geoffrey Brissaud
France	—N/a		Lou Terreaux; Noé Perron
Germany	Kai Jagoda	—N/a	Karla Maria Karl; Kai Hoferichter
Germany	Nikita Starostin	—N/a	—N/a
Hungary	Aleksandr Vlasenko	—N/a	
Ireland	—N/a		Carolane Soucisse; Shane Firus
Italy	Corey Circelli	Sarina Joos	Victoria Manni; Carlo Röthlisberger
Italy	Raffaele Francesco Zich	—N/a	
Kazakhstan	—N/a	Sofia Samodelkina	—N/a
Latvia	—N/a	Anastasija Konga	—N/a
Latvia	—N/a	Emilija Ozola	—N/a
Latvia	—N/a	Sofja Stepčenko	—N/a
Lithuania	Daniel Korabelnik	Meda Variakojyte	Paulina Ramanauskaitė; Deividas Kizala
Norway	—N/a	Linnea Kilsand	—N/a
Norway	—N/a	Mia Risa Gomez	—N/a
Poland	Kornel Witkowski	—N/a	Sofiia Dovhal; Wiktor Kulesza
Spain	Euken Alberdi	—N/a	Sofía Val; Asaf Kazimov
Spain	Tomàs-Llorenç Guarino Sabaté	—N/a	—N/a
Spain	Iker Oyarzabal Albas	—N/a	—N/a
Sweden	Casper Johansson	Lovisa Aav	—N/a
Sweden	Andreas Nordebäck	Josefin Brovall	—N/a
Sweden	—N/a	Josefin Taljegård	—N/a
Ukraine	Kyrylo Marsak	—N/a	
Ukraine	Ivan Shmuratko	—N/a	
United States	Jimmy Ma	—N/a	Emily Bratti; Ian Somerville
United States	Daniel Martynov	—N/a	Katarina Wolfkostin; Dimitry Tsarevski
United States	Jacob Sanchez	—N/a	—N/a

=== Changes to preliminary assignments ===
Date	Discipline	Withdrew	Added	Ref.
October 22	Ice dance	—N/a	(Australia); Holly Harris; Jason Chan	
November 8	Men	(United Kingdom); Edward Appleby	—N/a	
November 8	Men	(Italy); Nikolaj Memola	—N/a	
November 8	Men	(Kazakhstan); Rakhat Bralin	—N/a	
November 8	Men	(Lithuania); Daniels Kockers	—N/a	
November 8	Men	(Sweden); Gabriel Folkesson	—N/a	
November 8	Men	(Ukraine); Sergey Sokolov	—N/a	
November 8	Women	(Australia); Maria Chernyshova	—N/a	
November 8	Women	(United Kingdom); Nina Povey	—N/a	
November 8	Women	(India); Tara Prasad	—N/a	
November 8	Ice dance	(Cyprus); Angelina Kudryavtseva; Ilia Karankevich	—N/a	

== Results ==
=== Men's singles ===
Men's results
Rank	Skater	Nation	Total points	SP		FS	
1st place, gold medalist(s)	Jacob Sanchez	United States	225.60	2	76.63	1	148.97
2nd place, silver medalist(s)	Daniel Martynov	United States	212.73	4	75.61	6	137.12
3rd place, bronze medalist(s)	Roman Sadovsky	Canada	212.15	9	68.70	3	143.45
4	Nikita Starostin	Germany	211.21	10	67.43	2	143.78
5	Arlet Levandi	Estonia	210.82	6	71.13	5	139.69
6	Jimmy Ma	United States	209.71	11	66.27	4	143.44
7	Ivan Shmuratko	Ukraine	206.24	3	76.57	10	129.67
8	Andreas Nordebäck	Sweden	204.47	5	73.63	9	130.84
9	Mihhail Selevko	Estonia	202.74	1	76.78	11	125.96
10	Tomàs-Llorenç Guarino Sabaté	Spain	202.55	7	69.64	7	132.91
11	Kornel Witkowski	Poland	190.72	8	69.61	14	121.11
12	Samy Hammi	France	189.45	13	64.52	12	124.93
13	Raffaele Zich	Italy	189.42	12	64.73	13	124.69
14	Corey Circelli	Italy	185.89	20	53.86	8	132.03
15	Kyrylo Marsak	Ukraine	184.76	14	64.28	15	120.48
16	Casper Johansson	Sweden	179.46	16	63.95	17	115.51
17	Matias Lindfors	Finland	173.47	19	54.62	16	118.85
18	Kai Jagoda	Germany	170.05	17	59.95	19	110.10
19	Aleksandr Vlasenko	Hungary	169.15	15	64.05	20	105.10
20	Arttu Juusola	Finland	167.53	18	55.16	18	112.37
21	Iker Oyarzabal Albas	Spain	146.76	23	41.94	21	104.82
22	Douglas Gerber	Australia	145.85	21	50.22	22	95.63
23	Euken Alberdi	Spain	135.04	22	45.28	24	89.76
24	Daniel Korabelnik	Lithuania	133.57	24	40.36	23	93.21

=== Women's singles ===
Women's results
Rank	Skater	Nation	Total points	SP		FS	
1st place, gold medalist(s)	Nina Pinzarrone	Belgium	192.48	1	65.43	1	127.05
2nd place, silver medalist(s)	Sofia Samodelkina	Kazakhstan	173.25	3	53.98	2	119.27
3rd place, bronze medalist(s)	Sara-Maude Dupuis	Canada	163.58	2	55.04	4	108.54
4	Linnea Ceder	Finland	163.41	4	52.49	3	109.92
5	Jade Hovine	Belgium	149.52	11	45.35	5	104.17
6	Kristina Lisovskaja	Estonia	148.41	10	46.58	6	101.83
7	Léa Serna	France	147.09	7	50.73	7	96.36
8	Oona Ounasvuori	Finland	142.24	5	53.40	10	88.84
9	Sofja Stepčenko	Latvia	135.47	16	42.34	8	93.13
10	Selma Valitalo	Finland	135.08	14	44.90	9	90.18
11	Nataly Langerbaur	Estonia	134.21	6	51.98	15	82.23
12	Josefin Taljegård	Sweden	133.81	13	45.03	11	88.78
13	Meda Variakojyte	Lithuania	132.30	9	49.61	14	82.69
14	Anastasija Konga	Latvia	130.89	12	45.15	12	85.74
15	Emilija Ozola	Latvia	122.02	15	42.67	17	79.35
16	Lovisa Aav	Sweden	121.44	18	39.88	16	81.56
17	Marilena Kitromilis	Cyprus	121.00	8	49.72	19	71.28
18	Mia Risa Gomez	Norway	119.72	19	35.20	13	84.52
19	Josefin Brovall	Sweden	113.44	17	40.05	18	73.39
20	Linnea Kilsand	Norway	104.94	20	34.99	20	69.95
21	Martaliis Kuslap	Estonia	97.57	21	32.75	21	64.82
22	Karoliine Raudsepp	Estonia	85.58	22	30.68	22	54.90
23	Olesja Leonova	Estonia	80.26	23	27.16	23	53.10

=== Ice dance ===
Ice dance results
Rank	Team	Nation	Total points	RD		FD	
1st place, gold medalist(s)	Evgeniia Lopareva; Geoffrey Brissaud	France	198.91	1	78.93	1	119.98
2nd place, silver medalist(s)	Emily Bratti; Ian Somerville	United States	190.86	2	75.37	2	115.49
3rd place, bronze medalist(s)	Kateřina Mrázková; Daniel Mrázek	Czech Republic	188.84	3	75.15	3	113.69
4	Alicia Fabbri; Paul Ayer	Canada	185.05	4	75.05	4	110.00
5	Holly Harris; Jason Chan	Australia	179.53	5	70.84	5	108.69
6	Sofía Val; Asaf Kazimov	Spain	170.50	8	66.67	6	103.83
7	Carolane Soucisse; Shane Firus	Ireland	168.53	9	66.26	7	102.27
8	Victoria Manni; Carlo Röthlisberger	Italy	168.48	7	67.45	8	101.03
9	Lily Hensen; Nathan Lickers	Canada	165.40	10	65.85	9	99.55
10	Lou Terreaux; Noé Perron	France	159.28	11	62.04	10	97.24
11	Paulina Ramanauskaitė; Deividas Kizala	Lithuania	151.66	12	60.02	11	91.64
12	Karla Maria Karl; Kai Hoferichter	Germany	144.78	13	59.13	13	85.65
13	Sofiia Dovhal; Wiktor Kulesza	Poland	142.38	14	53.67	12	88.71
WD	Katarina Wolfkostin; Dimitry Tsarevski	United States	withdrew	6	69.28	withdrew from competition	
