= Livia Kaiser =

Swiss figure skater (born 2004)

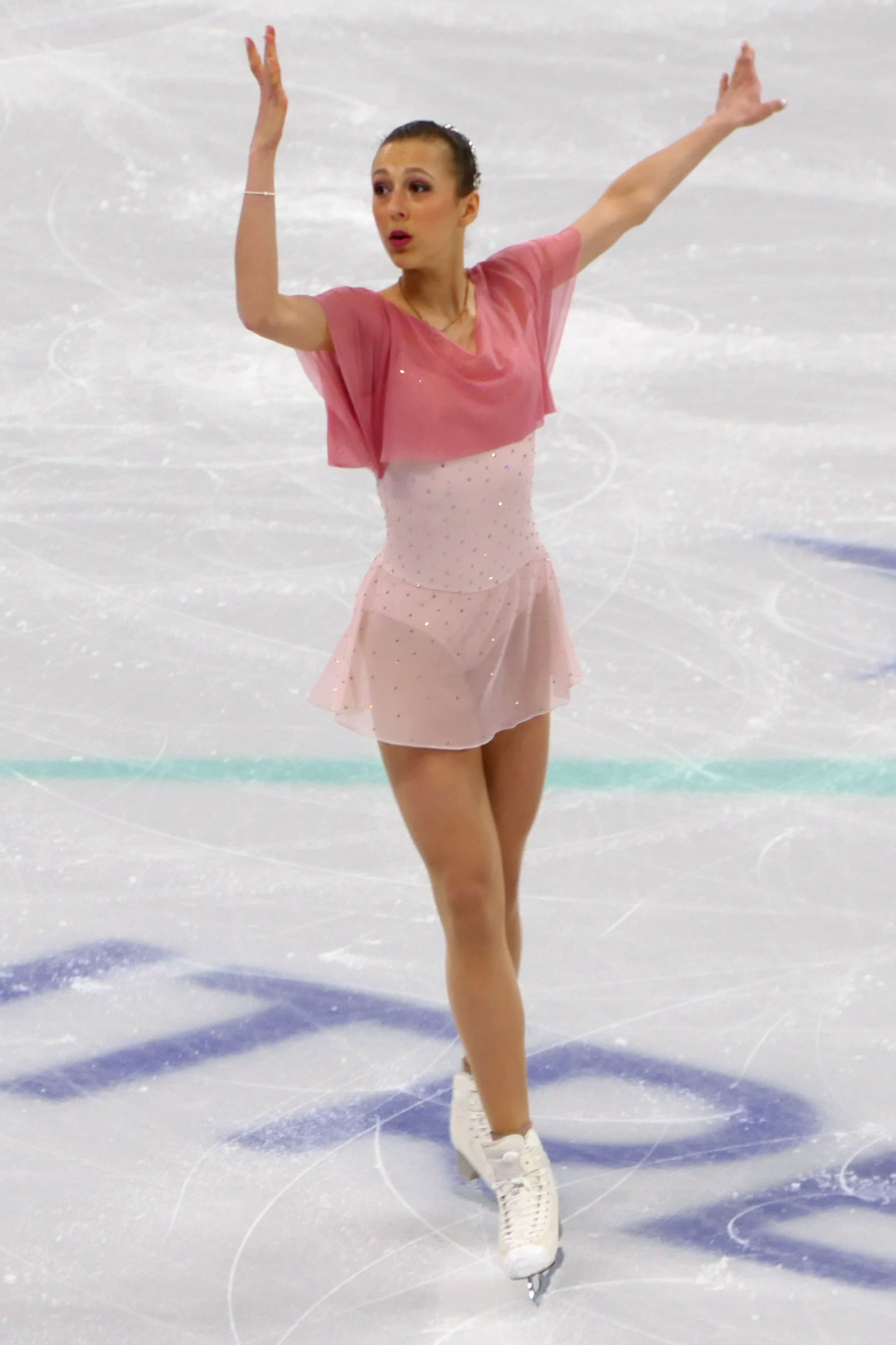
- Kaiser at the 2024 World Championships

Personal information
- Born: 2 October 2004 (age 22) Frauenfeld, Switzerland
- Home town: Amlikon, Switzerland
- Height: 1.69 m (5 ft 7 in)

Figure skating career
- Country: Switzerland
- Discipline: Women's singles
- Coach: Linda Van Troyen; Sindra Kriisa
- Skating club: Duebendorf Skating Club
- Began skating: 2011

Medal record
Swiss Championships
Gold medal – first place	2023 Chur	Singles
Silver medal – second place	2025 Geneva	Singles
Silver medal – second place	2026 Lugano	Singles
Bronze medal – third place	2022 Lucerne	Singles
Bronze medal – third place	2024 Küsnacht	Singles

Livia Kaiser (born 2 October 2004) is a Swiss figure skater. She is the 2023 Swiss national champion, a two-time Swiss national bronze medalist, and the 2021 Volvo Open Cup silver medalist. Kaiser has represented Switzerland at the European Championships three times, finishing as high as fourth in 2024.

Kaiser represented Switzerland at the 2026 Winter Olympics.

== Personal life ==
Kaiser was born on 2 October 2004 in Frauenfeld, Switzerland. She aspires to become either a veterinarian or a figure skating coach.

== Career ==
=== Early years ===
Kaiser became inspired to take up figure skating at age seven after watching countrywoman Sarah Meier win the 2011 European Championships.

In the 2021–22 season, Kaiser reached the Swiss national podium for the first time as bronze medalist, and won silver medals internationally at the junior level at the Trophée Métropole Nice and the senior level at the Volvo Open Cup. She made her first appearance on the Challenger series at the 2021 CS Finlandia Trophy, coming nineteenth.

=== 2022–23 season: Senior National title ===
Kaiser was assigned to make her debut on the Junior Grand Prix, placing thirteenth at the 2022 JGP France and twentieth at the 2022 JGP Italy. She made three appearances on the Challenger circuit, finishing fourtheenth at the Nebelhorn Trophy, seventh at the Ice Challenge, and sixth at the 2022 CS Warsaw Cup.

At the 2023 Swiss Championships, Kaiser won the gold medal for the first time. She finished the season by making her European Championship debut at the 2023 edition, where she placed eighteenth.

=== 2023–24 season: Top 10 at European and World Championships ===
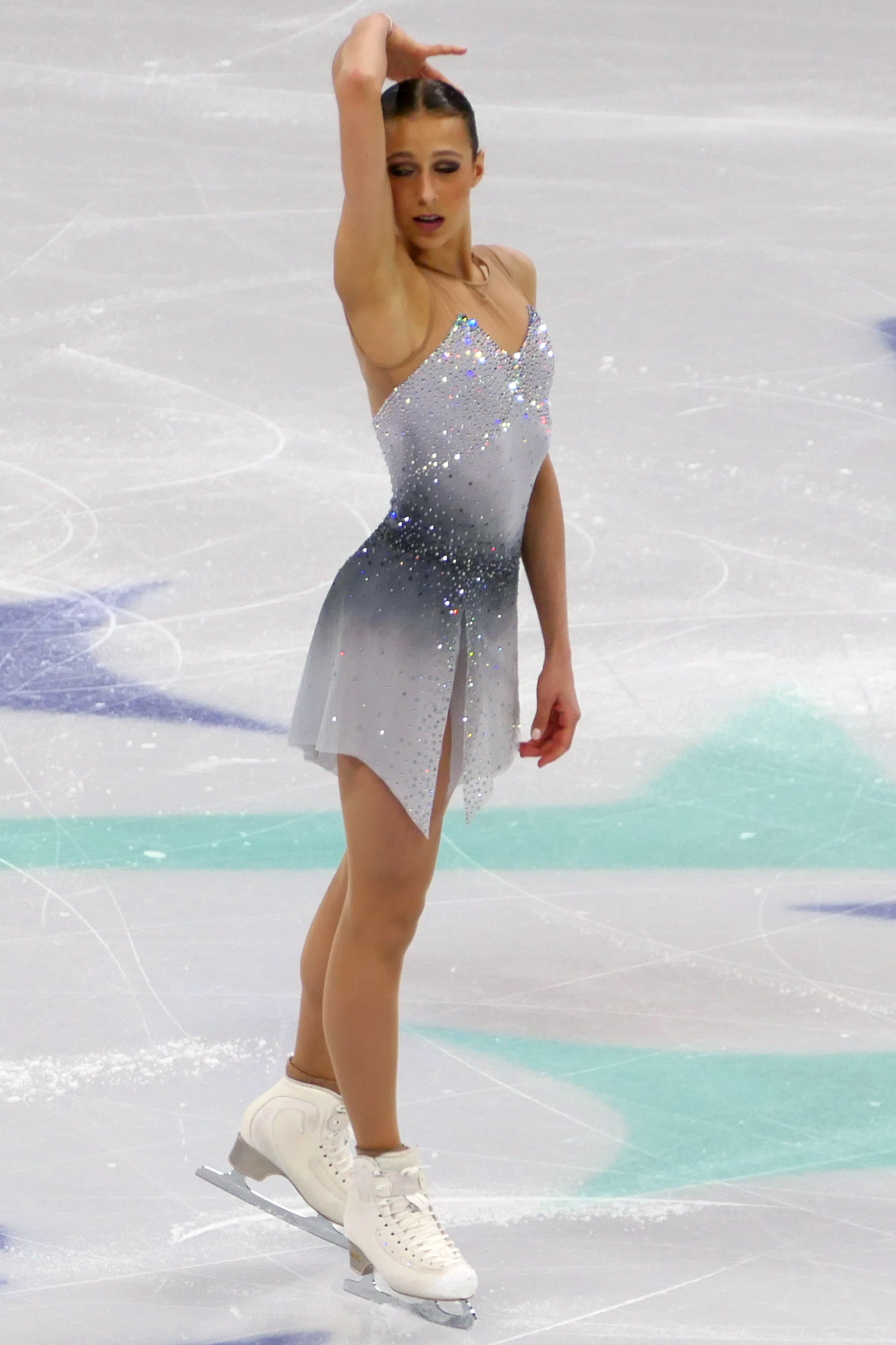
Kaiser during her free skate at the 2024 World Championships

Kaiser began the season with three Challenger assignments, coming fourth at both the Nebelhorn and Budapest Trophies and fifth at the 2023 CS Warsaw Cup. She won her second bronze medal at the Swiss Championships.

Appearing at the 2024 European Championships in Kaunas, Kaiser set new personal best results in both segments and overall and finished fourth at the competition, 7.57 points back of bronze medalist Nina Pinzarrone of Belgium. Of the result, Kaiser remarked "I still could do a little bit better but honestly, I am super pleased." Her new free skate program that she adopted for the second half of the season included music from The Hunger Games: The Ballad of Songbirds & Snakes, and drew praise from the film's star, Rachel Zegler.

In the leadup to the 2024 World Championships, Kaiser won gold at the 2024 Bavarian Open. At the World Championships, she came in ninth, and said she was "very happy I could finish my season with another good competition."

=== 2024–25 season: Grand Prix debut ===
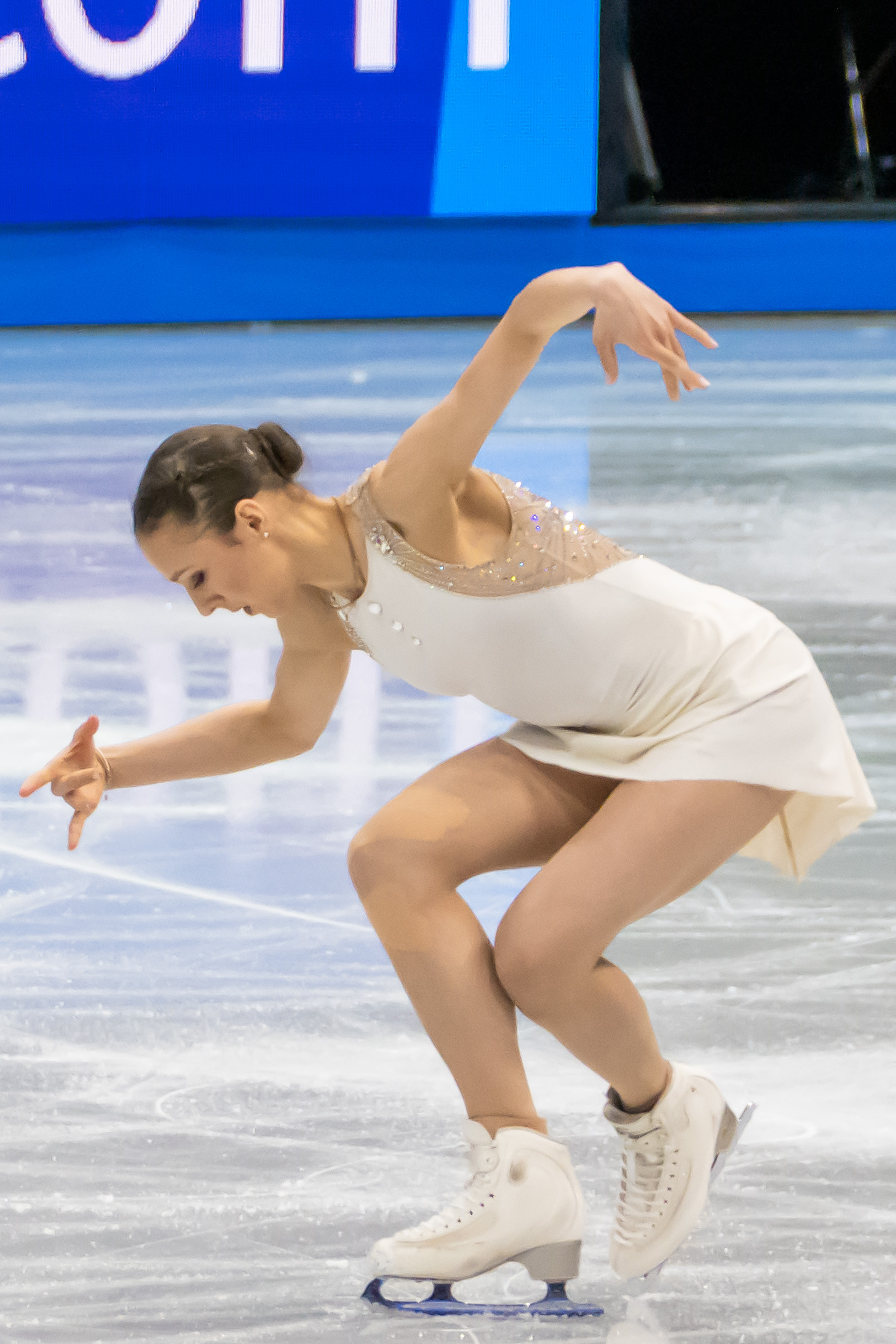
Kaiser during her free skate at the 2025 World Championships

Kaiser started the season by finishing fifth at the 2024 CS Nebelhorn Trophy. One month later, she debuted on the 2024–25 Grand Prix circuit, finishing eighth at 2024 Skate America and ninth at the 2024 Grand Prix de France. She would then go on to compete on the 2024–25 ISU Challenger Series, finishing sixth at the 2024 CS Warsaw Cup and seventh at the 2024 CS Golden Spin of Zagreb.

In mid-December, Kaiser won the silver medal at the 2025 Swiss Championships behind Kimmy Repond. She was assigned to compete at the 2025 European Championships; however, she withdrew after sustaining a two-centimeter deep cut on her calf from her training partner's blade only two days before she was set to leave for the event. It was soon determined that her wound had caused muscle damage as well as the formation of a fist-sized hematoma that required surgical removal.

Shortly before the 2025 World Championships in March, Kaiser resumed training. At the event, she placed twenty-third in the short program and remained in twenty-third after the free skate. Her placement, in addition to Kimmy Repond's twelfth-place finish won Switzerland two quotas for women's singles skating at the 2026 Winter Olympics.

=== 2025–26 season: Milano Cortina Olympics ===
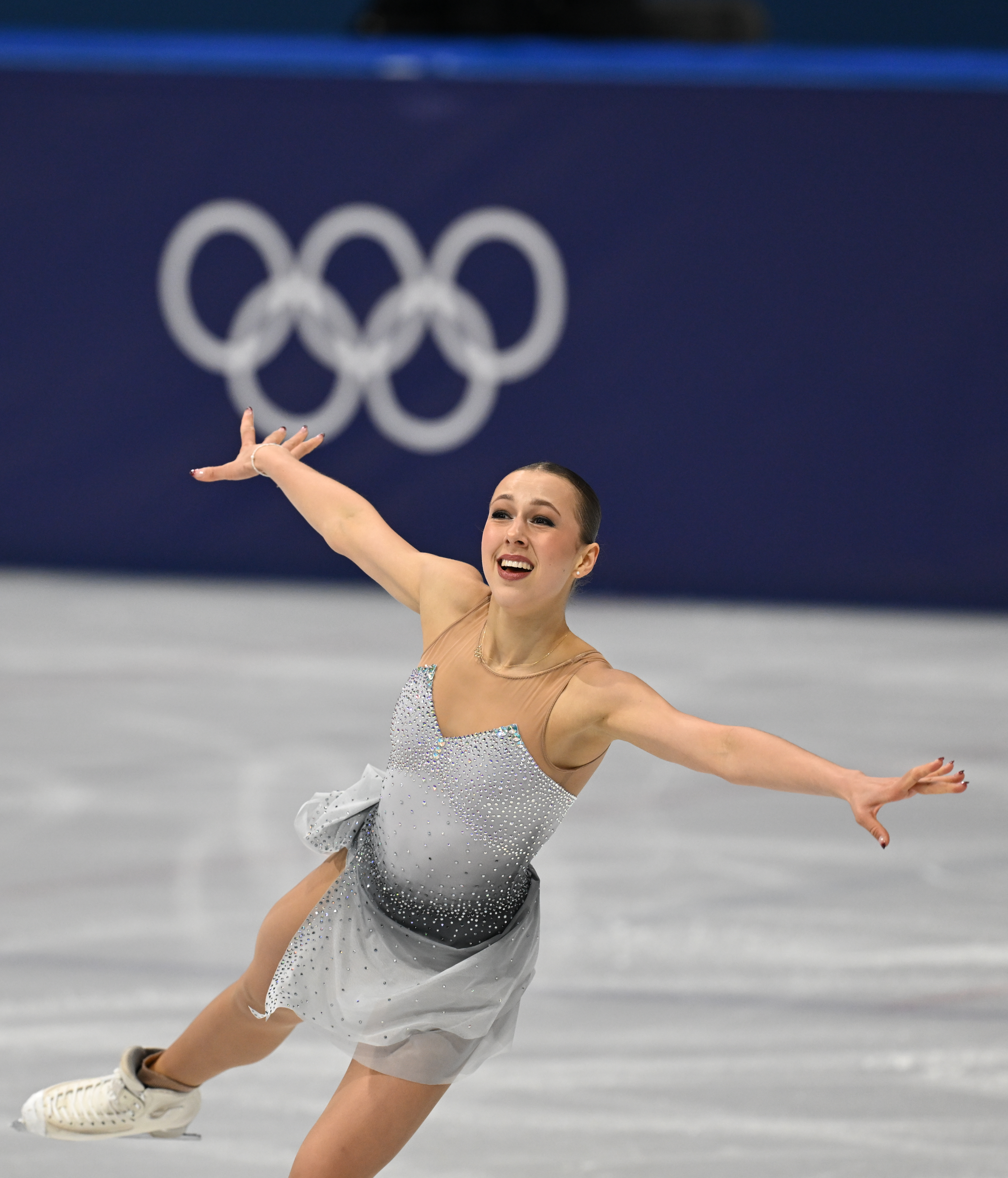
Kaiser performing at the 2026 Winter Olympics

Despite Kaiser still not being fully recovered from her injury the previous season, she still opted to compete in attempt to ensure her spot on the Swiss Olympic team. She opened her season by competing at the 2025 CS Nebelhorn Trophy but withdrew following the short program. She then went on to compete on the 2025–26 Grand Prix series, finishing twelfth at the 2025 Grand Prix de France and at the 2025 NHK Trophy. Between the two events, she placed sixth at the 2025 Swiss Open.

Following a fourteenth-place finish at the 2025 CS Tallinn Trophy, Kaiser won the silver medal at the 2026 Swiss Championships behind Leandra Tzimpoukakis. One month later, Kaiser placed seventeenth at the 2026 European Championships in Sheffield, England, United Kingdom. Following the event, she was named to the 2026 Winter Olympic team.

In February, Kaiser competed at the 2026 Winter Olympics. She placed twenty-third in the short program, qualifying for the free skate segment. Two days later, Kaiser placed twentieth in the free skate to finish in twenty-first place overall. "The Olympic Games here were simply an incredible time, an incredible experience," she said following her free skate. "I was here for the entire two weeks, partly training outside, but I experienced the whole two weeks here... I really enjoyed both programs. Of course, today in the free skate there was a little less pressure than in the short program, but I also really enjoyed the short program and simply had a good time."

A month following the Olympics, she competed at the 2026 World Championships in Prague, Czech Republic, finishing in twenty-first place overall after placing twenty-second in both the short program and free skate segments. "I have mixed feelings," Kaiser said in an interview after her free skate. "I am definitely happy that I was able to skate here again. I tried to fight for every element and still enjoy it. But for now, I am relieved that a bit of a break is coming. The whole season was just not easy mentally and psychologically."

== Programs ==
Season	Short program	Free skating	Exhibition
2026–2027	Lighthouse by Patrick Watson choreo. by Artem Fedorchenko		
2025–2026	I Will Always Love You by Whitney Houston & David Foster choreo. by Shae-Lynn Bourne	Lucy Gray (from The Ballad of Songbirds & Snakes) by William Wordsworth performed by Rachel Zegler; Lion Theme (from Lion) by Dustin O'Halloran & Hauschka; Run With Your Heart by Dream Cave choreo. by Benoît Richaud; Infinity Cycle by Cicely Parnas & Spearfisher; Attacca by Spearfisher & Brianna Tam choreo. by Shae-Lynn Bourne	
2024–2025	Me and the Devil by Soap&Skin choreo. by Shin Yea-ji	Prélude à l'après-midi d'un faune by Claude Debussy choreo. by Shin Yea-ji	
2023–2024	The World to Come by Fredrika Stahl choreo. by Benoît Richaud	Lucy Gray (from The Ballad of Songbirds & Snakes) by William Wordsworth performed by Rachel Zegler; Lion Theme (from Lion) by Dustin O'Halloran & Hauschka; Run With Your Heart by Dream Cave choreo. by Benoît Richaud; Impromptu No. 2 for Piano and Orchestra; Concerto Grosso in C Minor + End Credits; Andante Moderato – End Credits; Succession – Main Title Theme (from Succession) by Nicholas Britell choreo. by Benoît Richaud	Lost Without You by Freya Ridings choreo. by Benoît Richaud
2022–2023	Lost Without You by Freya Ridings choreo. by Benoît Richaud	Impromptu No. 2 for Piano and Orchestra; Concerto Grosso in C Minor + End Credits; Andante Moderato – End Credits; Succession – Main Title Theme (from Succession) by Nicholas Britell choreo. by Benoît Richaud	
2021–2022	Lost Without You by Freya Ridings choreo. by Benoît Richaud	No Way Out; Lovers – Flower Garden (from House of Flying Daggers) by Shigeru Umebayashi; Ronin by Peter Roo, Uyanga Bold choreo. by Benoît Richaud	

== Competitive highlights ==
- GP – Event of the ISU Grand Prix Series
- JGP – Event of the ISU Junior Grand Prix Series
- CS – Event of the ISU Challenger Series
- TBD – Assigned
- WD – Withdrew from competition

Competition placements at senior level
Season	2021–22	2022–23	2023–24	2024–25	2025–26	2026–27
Winter Olympics					21st	
World Championships			9th	23rd	21st	
European Championships		18th	4th		17th	
Swiss Championships	3rd	1st	3rd	2nd	2nd	
GP France				9th	12th	
GP NHK Trophy					12th	
GP Skate America				8th		
CS Budapest Trophy			4th			9th
CS Finlandia Trophy	19th					
CS Golden Spin of Zagreb				7th		
CS Ice Challenge		7th				
CS Nebelhorn Trophy		14th	4th	5th	WD	
CS Tallinn Trophy					14th	6th
CS Warsaw Cup		6th	5th	6th		
Bavarian Open			1st			
Northern Lights Trophy						1st
Swiss Open			5th		6th	
Volvo Open Cup	2nd					

Competition placements at junior level
Season	2019–20	2021–22	2022–23
World Junior Championships			21st
Swiss Championships	8th		
JGP France			13th
JGP Italy			20th
Dragon Trophy		6th	
Prague Ice Cup	3rd		
Santa Claus Cup	8th	WD	4th
Trophée Métropole Nice		2nd	

== Detailed results ==
ISU personal best scores in the +5/-5 GOE System
Segment	Type	Score	Event
Total	TSS	194.72	2024 European Championships
Short program	TSS	66.31	2024 European Championships
Short program	TES	37.42	2024 European Championships
Short program	PCS	29.74	2024 CS Nebelhorn Trophy
Free skating	TSS	128.41	2024 European Championships
Free skating	TES	68.70	2024 CS Nebelhorn Trophy
Free skating	PCS	59.89	2024 European Championships

=== Senior level ===
Results in the 2021-22 season
Date	Event	SP		FS		Total	
Date	Event	P	Score	P	Score	P	Score
Oct 7–10, 2021	(Finland) 2021 CS Finlandia Trophy	20	49.52	19	94.62	19	144.14
Nov 3-7, 2021	(Latvia) 2021 Volvo Open Cup	2	56.35	2	113.02	2	169.37
Nov 27–28, 2021	(Switzerland) 2022 Swiss Championships	2	60.45	3	104.00	3	164.45

Results in the 2022-23 season
Date	Event	SP		FS		Total	
Date	Event	P	Score	P	Score	P	Score
Sep 21–24, 2022	(Germany) 2022 CS Nebelhorn Trophy	14	47.21	14	81.13	14	128.34
Nov 9–13, 2022	(Austria) 2022 CS Ice Challenge	4	58.25	7	103.34	7	161.59
Dec 15–17, 2023	(Switzerland) 2024 Swiss Championships	1	60.46	2	115.47	1	175.93
Jan 10–14, 2024	(Lithuania) 2024 European Championships	9	60.25	20	90.95	18	151.20

Results in the 2023-24 season
Date	Event	SP		FS		Total	
Date	Event	P	Score	P	Score	P	Score
Sep 20–23, 2023	(Germany) 2023 CS Nebelhorn Trophy	6	57.72	4	111.75	4	169.47
Oct 13–15, 2023	(Hungary) 2023 CS Budapest Trophy	3	62.77	6	107.62	4	170.39
Oct 26-29, 2023	(Switzerland) 2023 Swiss Open	1	63.61	8	73.94	5	137.55
Nov 16–19, 2023	(Poland) 2023 CS Warsaw Cup	1	65.21	5	107.99	5	173.20
Dec 15–17, 2023	(Switzerland) 2024 Swiss Championships	5	46.90	3	111.17	3	158.07
Jan 8–14, 2024	(Lithuania) 2024 European Championships	4	66.31	4	128.41	4	194.72
Mar 18–24, 2024	(Canada) 2024 World Championships	10	64.05	9	123.19	9	187.24

Results in the 2024-25 season
Date	Event	SP		FS		Total	
Date	Event	P	Score	P	Score	P	Score
Sep 18–21, 2024	(Germany) 2024 Nebelhorn Trophy	3	62.87	4	128.37	5	191.24
Oct 18–20, 2024	(United States) 2024 Skate America	8	58.72	8	118.95	8	177.67
Nov 1–3, 2024	2024 Grand Prix de France	8	58.35	9	109.92	9	168.27
Nov 20–24, 2024	(Poland) 2024 CS Warsaw Cup	5	56.98	5	109.91	6	166.89
Dec 5–7, 2024	(Croatia) 2024 CS Golden Spin of Zagreb	15	45.35	5	115.95	7	161.30
Dec 13–15, 2024	(Switzerland) 2025 Swiss Championships	2	54.83	2	115.05	2	169.98
Mar 25–30, 2025	(United States) 2025 World Championships	23	53.68	23	93.22	23	146.90

Results in the 2025–26 season
Date	Event	SP		FS		Total	
Date	Event	P	Score	P	Score	P	Score
Sep 25–27, 2025	(Germany) 2025 CS Nebelhorn Trophy	13	43.82	–	–	–	WD
Oct 17–19, 2025	2025 Grand Prix de France	12	42.30	11	92.53	12	134.83
Oct 23–26, 2025	(Switzerland) 2025 Swiss Open	4	57.36	6	87.25	6	144.61
Nov 7–9, 2025	(Japan) 2025 NHK Trophy	12	47.95	12	86.26	12	134.21
Nov 25–30, 2025	(Estonia) 2025 CS Tallinn Trophy	10	50.80	14	86.58	14	137.38
Dec 19–21, 2025	(Switzerland) 2026 Swiss Championships	3	55.60	2	115.68	2	171.28
Jan 13–18, 2026	(United Kingdom) 2026 European Championships	9	57.02	19	97.02	17	154.04
Feb 17–19, 2026	(Italy) 2026 Winter Olympics	23	55.69	20	115.83	21	171.52
Mar 24–29, 2026	(Czech Republic) 2026 World Championships	22	54.91	22	104.67	21	159.58

Results in the 2026–27 season
Date	Event	SP		FS		Total	
Date	Event	P	Score	P	Score	P	Score
Oct 29 – Nov 1, 2026	(Iceland) 2026 Northern Lights Trophy	1	52.99	3	90.14	1	143.16
Oct 15–18, 2026	(Hungary) 2026 CS Budapest Trophy	7	61.35	11	106.72	9	168.07
Nov 16–22, 2026	(Estonia) 2026 CS Tallinn Trophy	3	63.87	8	110.23	6	174.10

=== Junior level ===
2022–23 season
Date	Event	SP	FS	Total
27 February–5 March 2023	2023 World Junior Championships	18; 52.71	23; 78.24	22; 130.95
28 November–4 December 2022	2022 Santa Claus Cup	24; 39.60	2; 108.49	4; 148.09
12–15 October 2022	2022 JGP Italy	21; 44.78	16; 90.09	20; 134.87
24–27 August 2022	2022 JGP France	16; 44.13	13; 88.06	13; 132.19
2021–22 season
Date	Event	SP	FS	Total
10–13 February 2022	2022 Dragon Trophy	7; 45.79	6; 88.85	6; 134.64
6–12 December 2021	2021 Santa Claus Cup	8; 51.78	WD	WD
6–12 December 2021	2021 Cup of Nice	2; 49.87	2; 101.62	2; 151.49
2019–20 season
Date	Event	SP	FS	Total
7–8 December 2019	2020 Swiss Championships	4; 44.58	9; 64.84	8; 109.42
2–8 December 2019	2019 Santa Claus Cup	6; 41.26	9; 70.91	8; 112.17
8–10 November 2019	2019 Prague Ice Cup	9; 42.34	2; 90.42	3; 132.76
