= Emi Hirai =

Japanese ice dancer

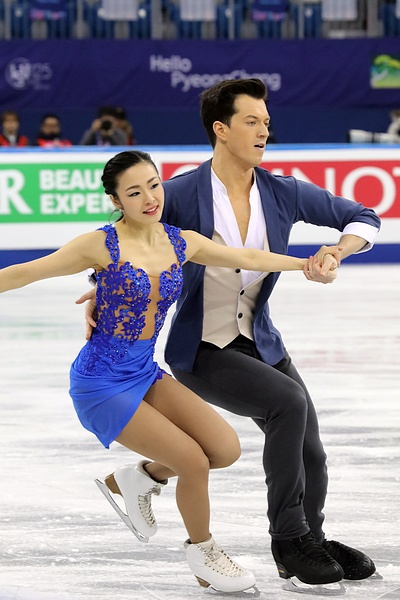
- Hirai and de la Asuncion at the 2017 Four Continents Championships

Personal information
- Native name: 平井 絵己
- Born: October 14, 1986 (age 40) Kurashiki, Okayama, Japan
- Height: 1.55 m (5 ft 1 in)

Figure skating career
- Country: Japan
- Partner: Taiyo Mizutani; Ayato Yuzawa; Marien de la Asuncion
- Coach: Muriel Zazoui, Olivier Schoenfelder, Rie Arikawa, Diana Ribas, Romain Haguenauer
- Skating club: Osaka SC; Training in Lyon, France
- Began skating: 1995
- Retired: May 8, 2017

Emi Hirai (Japanese: 平井 絵己; born October 14, 1986) is a Japanese former ice dancer. With skating partner Marien de la Asuncion, she is a six-time Japanese national silver medalist and competed at four Four Continents Championships. She now works as a coach in France and Japan.

== Personal life ==
Hirai was born on October 14, 1986, in Kurashiki, Okayama, Japan. She is a graduate of Kansai University.

She married her ice dance partner Marien de la Asuncion on May 22, 2021.

== Career ==
Hirai began skating in 1995 on Children's Day. During her first time skating, she fell and another skater ran over her hand, causing a hairline fracture. After she healed, her father took her back to the rink, not wanting her to develop a fear of sports. A year later, at age nine, she began training competitively. She initially trained as a single skater. In 2004, her last year at the junior level, she placed 12th at the Japan Junior Championships.

She had initially intended to retire after graduating from university, but an official suggested she try ice dance. She switched to ice dance in 2008, during her last year at university. Hirai competed at the 2008 West Japan sectional championships in both single skating and ice dance; she qualified to the national championships in dance but not single skating.

Following a partnership with Ayato Yuzawa in the 2008–09 season, she competed with Taiyo Mizutani in 2009–10 and 2010–11. In the summer of 2010, they trained in Lyon with Muriel Boucher-Zazoui. However, Mizutani was injured, and the pair returned to Japan for treatment. After the national championships, the pair split, and Hirai returned to Lyon, where she trained alone for six months.

Hirai teamed up with French ice dancer Marien de la Asuncion in 2011, though they had a considerable height difference of 24 centimetres (9.4 in) and a language barrier (de la Asuncion had better English skills; Hirai spoke no French at the time) that caused communication difficulties. de la Asuncion agreed to compete for Japan, and Hirai began to study French to improve their communication.

They took the silver medal at the 2011–12 Japan Championships; they went on to win a total of six consecutive silver medals at the national championships. The next year, they made their international debut at the 2012 Nebelhorn Trophy, where they placed 14th. In February, they were 11th at the 2013 Four Continents Championships.

Hirai and de la Asuncion placed 8th at the 2014 NHK Trophy. Later that season, they had their best placement at the Four Continents Championships, where they finished 8th as well.

Hirai and de la Asuncion performing a lift at the 2016 Four Continents Championships

Before the 2015 NHK Trophy, de la Asuncion took a hard blow to his lower back and was unable to walk due to severe bruising. He decided to skate anyway, using painkillers, and the pair placed 8th out of 8 teams. The next year, the pair placed 9th at the 2016 NHK Trophy.

Their last competition was the 2017 Four Continents Championships, where they finished in 12th. Feeling satisfied with their careers, they mutually decided to retire, which they announced in May.

== Post-competitive career ==
Hirai coaches ice dance in Lyon with de la Asuncion for half the year, and she coaches single skating in Japan for the other half of the year.

== Programs ==
With de la Asuncion

Season	Short dance	Free dance	Exhibition
2016–17	Blues: I Just Want to Love by Etta James; Swing: Puttin' On the Ritz by Irving Berlin	Kiss; Purple Rain; U Got the Look by Prince	I Just Want to Love by Etta James; Puttin' On the Ritz by Irving Berlin
2015–16	Waltz: Il Terzo Fuochista by Tiziana Tosca Donati; Polka: Everything Is Illuminated (from "Odessa" soundtrack); Waltz: Il Terzo Fuochista by Tiziana Tosca Donati	Fantasy on Puccini's Turandot by Vanessa-Mae; Nessun dorma performed by Luciano Pavarotti; Fantasy on Puccini's Turandot by Vanessa-Mae	
2014–15	Garcia Lorca; Farrucas by Pepe Romero	Peter Gunn Theme; Riot in Cell Block Number 9; Shake a Tail Feather by The Blues Brothers	
2013–14	Quickstep: Love Bug by Rick Guard; Slow fox: Creep; Quickstep: Love Bug by Rick Guard	James Bond music: Skyfall by Thomas Newman; Breadcrumbs; Silhouette; GoldenEye by Éric Serra; James Bond Theme	
2012–13	Polka: Feuerfest, op. 269 by Josef Strauss; Waltz: The Blue Danube, op 314 by Johann Strauss II; March: Radetzky March by Johann Strauss I	Solace by Vanessa-Mae; Tango de los exilados by Walter Taieb, Vanessa-Mae	

== Competitive highlights ==
GP: Grand Prix; CS: Challenger Series; JGP: Junior Grand Prix

=== With de la Asuncion ===
International
Event	11–12	12–13	13–14	14–15	15–16	16–17
Four Continents		11th	11th	8th	12th	12th
GP NHK Trophy				8th	8th	9th
CS Finlandia						9th
CS Golden Spin					4th	
Cup of Nice				6th		
Golden Spin			9th			
Ice Challenge			10th			
Nebelhorn Trophy		14th				
Toruń Cup					5th	
Trophy of Lyon		7th				
National
Japan Champ.	2nd	2nd	2nd	2nd	2nd	2nd
TBD = Assigned; WD = Withdrew

=== With Yuzawa and Mizutani ===
International
Event	2008–09 (with Yuzawa)	2009–10 (with Mizutani)	2010–11 (with Mizutani)
Winter Universiade	16th		
Mont Blanc Trophy		11th	
National
Japan Championships	3rd	2nd	2nd

=== Women's Singles ===
National
Event	01–02	02–03	03–04	04–05	05–06	06–07	07–08
Japan Champ.					15th	14th	14th
Japan Junior	18th	14th	17th	12th			
