= Nathan Lickers =

Canadian ice dancer

Personal information
- Native name: Honigo̱hasá:sdoh (Seneca)
- Born: 1 July 2001 (age 25) Six Nations of the Grand River, Ontario, Canada
- Home town: Six Nations of the Grand River
- Height: 1.82 m (5 ft 11 1/2 in)

Figure skating career
- Country: Canada
- Discipline: Ice dance
- Partner: Lily Hensen
- Coach: Adrián Díaz; Scott Moir; Cara Moir; Sheri Moir; Justin Trojek; Madison Hubbell
- Skating club: Ilderton Skating Club

Nathan Lickers (Seneca: Honigo̱hasá:sdoh; born 1 July 2001) is a Canadian ice dancer. With his skating partner, Lily Hensen, he is the 2022 CS Ice Challenge bronze medalist.

== Personal life ==
Lickers was born on 1 July 2001 in Six Nations of the Grand River, Ontario, Canada. He is Haudenosaunee Seneca, Wolf clan.

== Career ==
Lickers began learning how to skate when he was seven years old. He transitioned from single skating to ice dance at a young age and teamed up with his former skating partner, Lily Hensen, in January 2012.

== Programs ==
=== Ice dance with Lily Hensen ===
Season	Rhythm dance	Free dance
2025–2026	La Bomba by Azul Azul; María; Livin' la Vida Loca by Ricky Martin choreo. by Scott Moir, Madison Hubbell, Cara Moir	Blues for Klook by Eddy Louiss choreo. by Scott Moir, Madison Hubbell, Cara Moir
2024–2025	Slippery When Wet; Brick House by the Commodores	
2023–2024	Whip It by Devo; The Safety Dance by Men Without Hats; Total Eclipse of the Heart by Bonnie Tyler; It Takes Two by Rob Base & DJ E-Z Rock choreo. by Adrián Díaz, Cara Moir	Oquiton; Pomok naka Poktoinskwes by Jeremy Dutcher; Honor Song by Jeremy Dutcher and Yo-Yo Ma choreo. by Adrián Díaz, Cara Moir
2022–2023		Work Song; Movement by Hozier choreo. by Sheri Moir
2021–2022	Real Life; Blinding Lights by The Weeknd choreo. by Scott Moir, Sheri Moir	

== Competitive highlights ==
=== Ice dance with Lily Hensen ===
- CS – Event of the ISU Challenger Series
- TBD – Assigned
- WD – Withdrew from competition

Competition placements at senior level
Season	2021–22	2022–23	2023–24	2024–25	2025–26
Four Continents					8th
Canadian Championships	9th	7th	4th	5th	6th
CS Denis Ten Memorial				11th	
CS Finlandia Trophy			8th		
CS Ice Challenge		3rd			
CS Kinoshita Group Cup					7th
CS Nebelhorn Trophy					6th
CS Tallinn Trophy				9th	
Lake Placid Ice Dance		7th	10th	12th	7th
Skate Canada Challenge	4th	2nd	6th	1st	2nd

Competition placements at junior level
Season	2019–20
Canadian Championships	6th

== Detailed results ==
ISU personal best scores in the +5/-5 GOE System
Segment	Type	Score	Event
Total	TSS	165.40	2024 CS Tallinn Trophy
Rhythm dance	TSS	65.85	2024 CS Tallinn Trophy
Rhythm dance	TES	37.12	2024 CS Tallinn Trophy
Rhythm dance	PCS	29.14	2025 CS Kinoshita Group Cup
Free dance	TSS	101.60	2026 Four Continents Championships
Free dance	TES	58.24	2026 Four Continents Championships
Free dance	PCS	43.50	2024 CS Tallinn Trophy

=== Ice dance with Lily Hensen ===
Results in the 2025–26 season
Date	Event	RD		FD		Total	
Date	Event	P	Score	P	Score	P	Score
Sep 25–27, 2025	(Germany) 2025 CS Nebelhorn Trophy	6	58.22	6	96.02	6	154.24
Sep 5–7, 2025	(Japan) 2025 CS Kinoshita Group Cup	7	60.29	7	93.74	7	154.03
July 29–31, 2025	(United States) 2025 Lake Placid Ice Dance International	6	66.25	8	97.79	7	164.04
Nov 27–29, 2025	2025 Skate Canada Challenge	2	68.61	2	110.44	2	179.05
Jan 5–11, 2026	(Canada) 2026 Canadian Championships	8	66.93	5	107.92	6	174.85
Jan 21-25, 2026	(China) 2026 Four Continents Championships	9	62.96	8	101.60	8	164.56
