= Marien de la Asuncion =

French ice dancer

Marien de La Asuncion
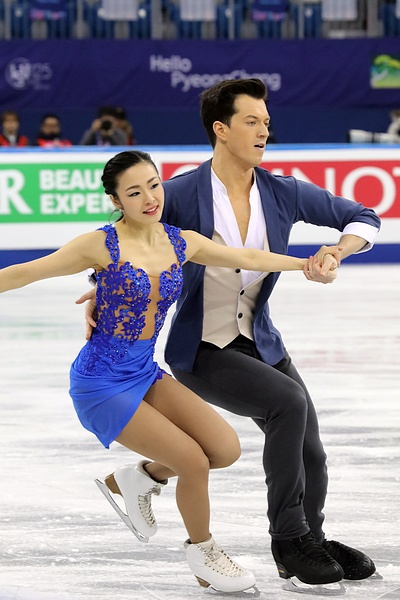

Personal information
- Born: February 6, 1989 (age 37) Lyon, France
- Height: 1.79 m (5 ft 10 1/2 in)

Figure skating career
- Country: Japan
- Partner: Emi Hirai
- Coach: Muriel Zazoui, Olivier Schoenfelder, Rie Arikawa, Diana Ribas
- Skating club: Osaka SC
- Began skating: 2001
- Retired: May 8, 2017

Marien de La Asuncion (born 6 February 1989) is a French retired ice dancer who competed for Japan with skating partner Emi Hirai. Together, they are four-time Japanese national silver medalists and have competed at four Four Continents Championships.

== Career ==
De La Asuncion began skating in 2001. Following a partnership with Rowan Musson in the 2007–08 season, he competed with Chloé Ibanez in 2008–09 and 2009–10.

In 2011, de La Asuncion teamed up with Emi Hirai to compete for Japan. They took the silver medal at the 2011–12 Japan Championships. Making their international debut, they placed 14th at the 2012 Nebelhorn Trophy and 11th at the 2013 Four Continents Championships.

Hirai and de La Asuncion have appeared at two Grand Prix events, placing 8th at the 2014 NHK Trophy and 2015 NHK Trophy.

Hirai and de la Asuncion announced their retirement on May 8, 2017, on de la Asuncion's Twitter page.

== Programs ==
With Hirai

Season	Short dance	Free dance	Exhibition
2016–17	Blues: I Just Want to Love by Etta James; Swing: Puttin' On the Ritz by Irving Berlin	Kiss; Purple Rain; U Got the Look by Prince	I Just Want to Love by Etta James; Puttin' On the Ritz by Irving Berlin
2015–16	Waltz: Il Terzo Fuochista by Tiziana Tosca Donati; Polka: Everything Is Illuminated (from "Odessa" soundtrack); Waltz: Il Terzo Fuochista by Tiziana Tosca Donati	Fantasy on Puccini's Turandot by Vanessa-Mae; Nessun dorma performed by Luciano Pavarotti; Fantasy on Puccini's Turandot by Vanessa-Mae	
2014–15	Garcia Lorca; Farrucas by Pepe Romero	Peter Gunn Theme; Riot in Cell Block Number 9; Shake a Tail Feather by The Blues Brothers	
2013–14	Quickstep: Love Bug by Rick Guard; Slow fox: Creep; Quickstep: Love Bug by Rick Guard	James Bond music: Skyfall by Thomas Newman; Breadcrumbs; Silhouette; GoldenEye by Éric Serra; James Bond Theme	
2012–13	Polka: Feuerfest, op. 269 by Josef Strauss; Waltz: The Blue Danube, op 314 by Johann Strauss II; March: Radetzky March by Johann Strauss I	Solace by Vanessa-Mae; Tango de los exilados by Walter Taieb, Vanessa-Mae	

== Competitive highlights ==
GP: Grand Prix; CS: Challenger Series; JGP: Junior Grand Prix

=== With Hirai for Japan ===
International
Event	11–12	12–13	13–14	14–15	15–16	16–17
Four Continents		11th	11th	8th	12th	12th
GP NHK Trophy				8th	8th	9th
CS Finlandia						9th
CS Golden Spin					4th	
Cup of Nice				6th		
Golden Spin			9th			
Ice Challenge			10th			
Nebelhorn Trophy		14th				
Toruń Cup					5th	
Trophy of Lyon		7th				
National
Japan Champ.	2nd	3rd	2nd	2nd	2nd	2nd
TBD = Assigned; WD = Withdrew

=== With Musson and Ibanez for France ===
International
Event	2007–08 (with Musson)	2008–09 (with Ibanez)	2009–10 (with Ibanez)
International Cup of Nice			1st
International: Junior
JGP Germany			18th
JGP United Kingdom	12th		
National
French Championships			4th
French Junior Champ.	6th	9th	5th
