= Figure skating at the Reykjavik International Games =

Annual figure skating competition

The Icelandic Skating Association organizes a figure skating competition as a part of the annual multi-sport Reykjavik International Games, which is put on by the Reykjavík Sports Union. It has been sanctioned by the International Skating Union since 2015. The event is held in January or February at the Laugardalur ice skating rink in Reykjavík, Iceland. Medals may be awarded in men's singles and women's singles at the senior, junior, and novice levels.

== Senior results ==
=== Men's singles ===
Year	Gold	Silver	Bronze	Ref.
2011	(United States) Eric Groth	No other competitors		
2018	(France) Adrien Tesson	No other competitors		
2020	(Denmark) Nikolaj Molgaard Pedersen	No other competitors		
2022	(Finland) Lauri Lankila	No other competitors		
2023	(Sweden) Andreas Nordebäck	(Sweden) Gabriel Folkesson	(Finland) Makar Suntsev	
2024	(United Kingdom) Connor Bray	No other competitors		

=== Women's singles ===
Year	Gold	Silver	Bronze	Ref.
2009	(Sweden) Frederica Lansome	(Iceland) Audrey Freyja Clarke	No other competitors	
2010	(Sweden) Sandra Olsson	No other competitors		
2011	(Slovakia) Ivana Reitmayerova	No other competitors		
2012	(Slovakia) Ivana Reitmayerova	No other competitors		
2013	(Iceland) Guðbjörg Guttormsdóttir	(Sweden) Josefine Karlsson	No other competitors	
2014	(Iceland) Nadía Margrét Jamchi	No other competitors		
2015	(United Arab Emirates) Zahra Lari	No other competitors		
2016	(Norway) Camilla Gjersem	(Hong Kong) Maisy Hiu Ching Ma	(South Africa) Michaela Du Toit	
2017	(United Kingdom) Karly Robertson	(Australia) Brooklee Han	(Switzerland) Shalene Rügger	
2018	(Azerbaijan) Morgan Flood	(Australia) Katie Pasfield	(Iceland) Eva Dögg Sæmundsdóttir	
2019	(Switzerland) Tanja Odermatt	(Kazakhstan) Aiza Imambek	(Azerbaijan) Morgan Flood	
2020	(Norway) Marianne Stålen	(Poland) Oliwia Rzepiel	(Norway) Louisa Warwin	
2021	(Iceland) Aldís Kara Bergsdóttir	No other competitors		
2022	(Finland) Petra Palmio	(Iceland) Aldís Kara Bergsdóttir	(Norway) Frida Thuridotter Berge	
2023	(Finland) Nella Pelkonen	(Finland) Janna Jyrkinen	(Finland) Olivia Lisko	
2024	(Iceland) Julia Sylvia Gunnarsdottir	(India) Tara Prasad	(Netherlands) Roos van der Pas	

== Junior results ==
=== Men's singles ===
Year	Gold	Silver	Bronze	Ref.
2011	(Slovakia) Peter Reitmayer	(Sweden) Albin Boudrée	No other competitors	
2014	(Belgium) Timothy Manand	No other competitors		
2016	(Hong Kong) Wayne Wing Jin Chung	No other competitors		
2017	(France) Yann Frechon	(Republic of Ireland) Sam McAllister	No other competitors	
2018	(France) Landrey Le May	(France) Xavier Vauclin	(France) Yann Frechon	
2019	(Australia) Darian Kaptich	(Chinese Taipei) Elliot Jang	No other competitors	
2020	(United Kingdom) Edward Appleby	No other competitors		
2022	(United Kingdom) Edward Appleby	No other competitors		
2023	(Sweden) Casper Johansson	(Finland) Matias Lindfors	(Sweden) Jonathan Egyptson	
2024	(Denmark) Wendell Hansson-Ostergaard	No other competitors		

=== Women's singles ===
Year	Gold	Silver	Bronze	Ref.
2009	(Sweden) Johanna Wussow	(Sweden) Anna Gabrielsson	(Sweden) Elisabet Svensson	
2010	(Finland) Reetta Rompanen	(Finland) Rosaliina Kuparinen	(Finland) Mari Savolainen	
2011	(Sweden) Lina Sköldberg	(Finland) Iida Nätkynmäki	(Sweden) Amanda Hackman	
2012	(Sweden) Lina Sköldberg	(Iceland) Julia Gretarsdottir	(Sweden) Gabrielle Bergman	
2013	(Iceland) Vala Rún B. Magnúsdóttir	(United Kingdom) Kristen Spours	(Iceland) Agnes Dís Brynjarsdóttir	
2014	(Iceland) Vala Rún B. Magnúsdóttir	(Iceland) Hrafnhildur Ósk Birgisdóttir	(Iceland) Agnes Dís Brynjarsdóttir	
2015	(Switzerland) Shaline Rügger	(Philippines) Samantha Cabiles	(Iceland) Kristín Valdís Örnólfsdóttir	
2016	(Finland) Jade Rautiainen	(Bulgaria) Theodora Markova	(Finland) Oona Ounasvuori	
2017	(Azerbaijan) Morgan Flood	(Switzerland) Yoonmi Lehmann	(Finland) Jade Rautiainen	
2018	(Australia) Amelia Jackson	(Netherlands) Kyarha van Tiel	(Iceland) Kristín Valdís Örnólfsdóttir	
2019	(New Zealand) Jocelyn Hong	(Iceland) Aldís Kara Bergsdóttir	(Iceland) Marta María Jóhannsdóttir	
2020	(Latvia) Marija Bolsheva	(United Kingdom) Elena Komova	(Denmark) Amalie Borup Christensen	
2021	(Iceland) Júlía Rós Viðarsdóttir	(Iceland) Júlía Sylvía Gunnarsdóttir	(Iceland) Eydís Gunnarsdóttir	
2022	(Iceland) Júlía Rós Viðarsdóttir	(Norway) Ida Eline Vamnes	(Norway) Oda Havgår Tonnesen	
2023	(Finland) Iida Karhunen	(Finland) Lotta Artimo	(Finland) Petra Lahti	
2024	(Finland) Jenni Hirvonen	(Philippines) Cathryn Limketkai	(Argentina) Cecilia Donohue	
