= Oona Ounasvuori =

Finnish figure skater

Personal information
- Born: 30 October 1998 (age 28) Savonlinna, Finland
- Home town: Helsinki, Finland
- Height: 1.66 m (5 ft 5 1/2 in)

Figure skating career
- Country: Finland
- Coach: Alisa Drei
- Skating club: Espoon Taitoluisteluklubi ry
- Began skating: 2005

Oona Ounasvuori (born 30 October 1998) is a Finnish figure skater. She is the 2022 Nordic champion, 2017 Open d'Andorra silver medalist, 2021 Volvo Open Cup bronze medalist, and the 2024 Finnish national bronze medalist.

== Career ==
=== Early years ===
Ounasvuori began learning to skate in 2005. She competed in the advanced novice category beginning in the 2011–12 season through 2013–14. Her junior international debut came in February 2015 at the Bavarian Open.

=== Senior career ===
In November 2017, Ounasvuori won silver at the Open d'Andorra.

In November 2021, she won bronze at the Volvo Open Cup. In December, she achieved the best national result of her career to date, finishing fourth at the Finnish Championships. Following Emmi Peltonen's withdrawal, Finland selected Ounasvuori to compete at the 2022 European Championships in Tallinn, Estonia.

Ounasvuori was invited to make her Grand Prix debut at the 2023 Grand Prix of Espoo, where she finished in twelfth place. She won the bronze medal at the 2023-24 Finnish Championships, behind Nella Pelkonen and Olivia Lisko.

== Programs ==
Season	Short program	Free skating
2024–25	River; River (King Kavalier Remix) by Bishop Briggs, King Kavalier, Ian Scott, & Mark Jackson choreo. by Benoit Richaud, Alisa Drei	Violin Fantasy on Puccini's Turandot by Vanessa Mae; Nessun dorma (from Turandot) by Giacomo Puccini performed by Sarah Brightman choreo. by Benoit Richaud, Alisa Drei
2023–24	Nothing Else Matters by Metallica performed by Miley Cyrus, Elton John, Andrew Watt, Robert Trujillo, Chad Smith, Yo-Yo Ma choreo. by Benoit Richaud, Alisa Drei	Violin Fantasy on Puccini's Turandot by Vanessa Mae; Nessun dorma (from Turandot) by Giacomo Puccini performed by Sarah Brightman choreo. by Benoit Richaud, Alisa Drei
2022–23	Voilà by Barbara Pravi choreo. by Valentin Molotov	Love in the Dark by Adele choreo. by Valentin Molotov
2021–22	Ready by Louisahhh!!!; Physical by Dua Lipa choreo. by Benoit Richaud	The Secret History by Kerry Muzzey performed by Chamber Orchestra of London, Andrew Skeet choreo. by Benoit Richaud
2020–21	Ready by Louisahhh!!! choreo. by Benoit Richaud	Physical by Dua Lipa choreo. by Benoit Richaud

== Competitive highlights ==
- CS – Event of the ISU Challenger Series
- TBD – Assigned
- WD – Withdrew from event

Competition placements at senior level
Season	2016–17	2017–18	2018–19	2019–20	2020–21	2021–22	2022–23	2023–24	2024–25	2025–26	2026–27
European Championships						25th					
Finnish Championships	11th	8th	6th	7th		4th	5th	3rd	5th	4th	
CS Cup of Austria						11th					
CS Finlandia Trophy						14th	19th	WD			
CS Golden Spin of Zagreb			25th					15th			
CS Ice Star				10th							
CS Lombardia Trophy							14th		15th		
CS Nebelhorn Trophy						11th				16th	
CS Tallinn Trophy							4th		8th		15th
CS Trophée Métropole Nice									21st		
CS Warsaw Cup							9th			20th	
Bavarian Open			17th					6th	7th		
Bellu Memorial							5th		11th		
Challenge Cup						4th		7th			
Daugava Open Cup									3rd		
Jelgava Cup								5th			
Nordic Championships				5th		1st			12th	11th	
Open d'Andorra		2nd									
Skate Berlin										3rd	
Tallink Hotels Cup				6th	5th	8th		10th	7th		
Triglav Trophy									5th		
Volvo Open Cup (Note: Volvo Open Cup Fall)								6th			
Volvo Open Cup (Note: 51st Volvo Open Cup Spring)						3rd		3rd	7th	8th	

Competition placements at junior level
Season	2014–15	2015–16	2016–17
Finnish Championships	10th	19th	
Bavarian Open	10th		
Cup of Tyrol			25th
Coupe du Printemps		12th	
Gardena Spring Trophy	17th		
Leo Scheu		20th	
NRW Trophy			22nd
Reykjavik Games		3rd	
Tallinn Trophy		10th	

== Detailed results ==
ISU personal best scores in the +5/-5 GOE System
Segment	Type	Score	Event
Total	TSS	162.68	2021 CS Finlandia Trophy
Short program	TSS	56.34	2026 CS Tallinn Trophy
Short program	TES	32.07	2026 CS Tallinn Trophy
Short program	PCS	27.16	2021 CS Cup of Austria
Free skating	TSS	113.55	2021 CS Finlandia Trophy
Free skating	TES	60.66	2021 CS Finlandia Trophy
Free skating	PCS	54.24	2021 CS Cup of Austria

=== Senior results ===
Results in the 2024–25 season
Date	Event	SP		FS		Total	
Date	Event	P	Score	P	Score	P	Score
Sep 12–15, 2024	(Italy) 2024 CS Lombardia Trophy	18	42.67	13	82.32	15	124.99
Oct 16–20, 2024	(France) 2024 CS Trophée Métropole Nice Côte d'Azur	22	40.37	20	80.28	21	120.65
Oct 31-Nov 3, 2024	(Latvia) 53rd Volvo Open Cup	9	43.23	4	87.98	7	131.21
Nov 11-17, 2024	(Estonia) 2024 CS Tallinn Trophy	5	53.40	10	88.84	8	142.24
Dec 13-15, 2024	(Finland) 2025 Finnish Championships	5	52.87	7	78.26	5	131.13
Jan 27 - Feb 2, 2025	(Germany) 2025 Bavarian Open	3	52.83	8	90.36	7	143.24
Feb 6-9, 2025	(Norway) 2025 Nordics Open	10	45.82	12	84.91	12	130.73
Feb 13-16, 2025	(Estonia) 2025 Tallink Hotels Cup	1	57.11	9	78.78	7	135.89
Feb 18-23, 2025	(Romania) 2025 Bellu Memorial	14	40.48	11	89.38	11	129.86
Mar 14-16, 2025	(Latvia) 2025 Daugava Open Cup	4	49.23	3	88.40	3	137.63
Apr 9-13, 2025	(Slovenia) 2025 Triglav Trophy	4	51.41	6	82.52	5	133.93

Results in the 2025–26 season
Date	Event	SP		FS		Total	
Date	Event	P	Score	P	Score	P	Score
Sep 25-27, 2025	(Germany) 2025 CS Nebelhorn Trophy	17	34.79	16	64.66	16	99.45
Nov 19–23, 2025	(Poland) 2025 CS Warsaw Cup	19	43.36	21	75.29	20	118.65
Dec 12-14, 2025	(Finland) 2026 Finnish Championships	5	53.92	4	92.44	4	146.36
Jan 22-25, 2026	(Latvia) 2026 Volvo Open Cup	8	39.53	9	64.25	8	103.58
Jan 28 – Feb 1, 2026	(Denmark) 2026 Nordic Championships	13	40.83	13	73.77	11	114.60
Feb 17-21, 2026	(Germany) 2026 Skate Berlin International	2	55.99	8	93.05	3	149.04

Results in the 2026–27 season
Date	Event	SP		FS		Total	
Date	Event	P	Score	P	Score	P	Score
Nov 16–22, 2026	(Estonia) 2026 CS Tallinn Trophy	8	56.34	21	89.63	15	145.97
