= Connor Bray =

British figure skater (born 2003)

Personal information
- Born: 7 July 2003 (age 23) Toyama, Japan
- Home town: London, England, United Kingdom
- Height: 1.80 m (5 ft 11 in)

Figure skating career
- Country: Great Britain
- Discipline: Men's singles
- Skating club: Lee Valley
- Began skating: 2012

Connor Bray (ブレイ コナー, Connor Bray, Hiragana: ぶれい こなあ; born 7 July 2003) is a British-Japanese figure skater. He won the gold medal at the 2024 Reykjavik International Games and the bronze medal at the 2024 Sonja Henie Trophy.

== Early life and education ==
Connor Bray was born on 7 July 2003 in Toyama, Japan, and currently resides in London, England. He began skating in 2012 and is a member of the Lee Valley skating club. In 2022, Connor studied at Chukyo University Senior High School, a private senior high school in Aichi Prefecture, Japan. He subsequently attended Queen Mary University of London School of Business and Management. In 2026 he entered Queen Mary University's Centre for Commercial Law Studies (CCLS) where he is pursuing LLM degree in International Tax Law.

== Competitive highlights ==
- JGP – Event of the ISU Junior Grand Prix Series
- CS – Event of the ISU Challenger Series

Competition placements at senior level
Season	2023–24	2024–25
British Championships	5th	5th
CS Lombardia Trophy		19th
EduSport Trophy		2nd
Reykjavik Games	1st	
Sonja Henie Trophy	3rd	
Tayside Trophy	11th	

Competition placements at junior level
Season	2019–20	2022–23
British Championships	2nd	3rd
JGP France		18th
JGP Latvia		23rd
Budapest Trophy		4th
Denkova-Staviski Cup	2nd	
Ice Challenge		3rd
Tayside Trophy	3rd	
Volvo Open Cup		6th

== Detailed results ==
ISU personal best scores in the +5/-5 GOE System
Segment	Type	Score	Event
Total	TSS	152.29	2024 CS Lombardia Trophy
Short program	TSS	55.32	2024 CS Lombardia Trophy
Short program	TES	26.92	2024 CS Lombardia Trophy
Short program	PCS	28.40	2024 CS Lombardia Trophy
Free skating	TSS	96.97	2024 CS Lombardia Trophy
Free skating	TES	43.52	2024 CS Lombardia Trophy
Free skating	PCS	54.45	2024 CS Lombardia Trophy

=== Senior level ===
Results in the 2023–24 season
Date	Event	SP		FS		Total	
Date	Event	P	Score	P	Score	P	Score
Oct 14–15, 2023	(United Kingdom) 2023 Tayside Trophy	16	42.68	10	98.19	11	140.87
Nov 30 – Dec 3, 2023	(United Kingdom) 2024 British Championships	4	54.74	5	101.00	5	155.74
Jan 26–28, 2024	(Iceland) 2024 Reykjavík International Games	1	53.10	1	79.33	1	132.43
Mar 8–10, 2024	(Norway) 2024 Sonja Henie Trophy	1	56.87	4	87.92	3	144.79

Results in the 2024–25 season
Date	Event	SP		FS		Total	
Date	Event	P	Score	P	Score	P	Score
Sep 12–15, 2024	(Italy) 2024 CS Lombardia Trophy	16	55.32	20	96.97	19	152.29
Nov 27 – Dec 1, 2024	(United Kingdom) 2025 British Championships	5	44.98	5	92.35	5	137.33
Dec 12–15, 2024	(Romania) 2024 EduSport Trophy	2	58.11	2	106.15	2	164.26
