= 2024 CS Lombardia Trophy =

Figure skating competition in Bergamo, Italy

- Type: ISU Challenger Series
- Date: September 13 – 15
- Season: 2024–25
- Location: Bergamo, Italy
- Host: Federazione Italiana Sport del Ghiaccio
- Venue: IceLab Bergamo Palaghiaccio

Champions
- Men's singles: (United States) Ilia Malinin
- Women's singles: (United States) Amber Glenn
- Pairs: (Italy) Sara Conti and Niccolò Macii
- Ice dance: (Italy) Charlène Guignard and Marco Fabbri
- Previous: 2023 CS Lombardia Trophy
- Next: 2025 CS Lombardia Trophy
- Previous CS: 2024 CS John Nicks International Pairs Competition
- Next CS: 2024 CS Nebelhorn Trophy

The 2024 CS Lombardia Trophy was held on September 13–15, 2024, in Bergamo, Italy. It was part of the 2024–25 ISU Challenger Series. Medals were awarded in men's singles, women's singles, pair skating, and ice dance.

== Entries ==
The International Skating Union published the list of entries on August 19, 2024.

Country	Men	Women	Pairs	Ice dance
Azerbaijan	Vladimir Litvintsev	—		Samantha Ritter; Daniel Brykalov
Bulgaria	Filip Kaymakchiev	—		
Chinese Taipei	—	Ting Tzu-Han	—	
Czech Republic	—	Eliška Březinová	Barbora Kuciánová; Martin Bidař	—
Estonia	Aleksandr Selevko	Niina Petrõkina	—	
Finland	Makar Suntsev	Oona Ounasvuori	—	
Finland	—	Selma Valitalo	—	
France	François Pitot	Clemence Mayindu	Aurélie Faula; Théo Belle	Natacha Lagouge; Arnaud Caffa
France	Xavier Vauclin	Maïa Mazzara	—	Lou Terreaux; Noé Perron
Georgia	Nika Egadze	Anastasiia Gubanova	—	
Germany	—		Annika Hocke; Robert Kunkel	Karla Maria Karl; Kai Hoferichter
Germany	—		—	Charise Matthaei; Max Liebers
Great Britain	Connor Bray	Kristen Spours	—	
Hong Kong	Chiu Hei Cheung	—	—	
Hungary	—		Maria Pavlova; Alexei Sviatchenko	Mariia Ignateva; Danijil Leonyidovics Szemko
Ireland	—			Carolane Soucisse; Shane Firus
Israel	Lev Vinokur	—		
Italy	—	Elena Agostinelli	Irma Caldara; Riccardo Maglio	Carlotta Argentieri; Francesco Riva
Italy	—	Lara Naki Gutmann	Sara Conti; Niccolò Macii	Leia Dozzi; Pietro Papetti
Italy	—	Anna Pezzetta	Rebecca Ghilardi; Filippo Ambrosini	Charlène Guignard; Marco Fabbri
Italy	—	—		Giulia Isabella Paolino; Andrea Tuba
Japan	Yuma Kagiyama	Kaori Sakamoto	Riku Miura; Ryuichi Kihara	—
Japan	Kao Miura	Rinka Watanabe	—	—
Japan	Shun Sato	—	—	—
Latvia	—	Anastasija Konga	—	
Lithuania	Daniels Kockers	—		
North Korea	Ri Ju Won	—	Ryom Tae-ok; Han Kum-chol	—
North Korea	Ro Yong Myong	—	—	—
South Africa	—	Gian-Quen Isaacs	Julia Mauder; Johannes Wilkinson	—
South Korea	Lim Ju-heon	Kim Seo-young	—	—
Spain	—			Athena Faith Roberts; Eric Alis
Sweden	Jonathan Egyptson	—		
Turkey	Alp Eren Özkan	—		
Ukraine	—	Tetiana Firsova	—	
Ukraine	—	Anastasia Gozhva	—	
United States	Jimmy Ma	Sarah Everhardt	—	Annabelle Morozov; Jeffrey Chen
United States	Ilia Malinin	Amber Glenn	—	Leah Neset; Artem Markelov
United States	Daniel Martynov	—	—	—

=== Changes to preliminary assignments ===
Date	Discipline	Withdrew	Ref.
August 21	Men	(Australia); Douglas Gerber	
August 21	Women	(Slovakia); Ema Doboszová	
August 22	Women	(Spain); Emilia Murdock	
August 26	Women	(Czech Republic); Barbora Vránková	
September 3	Men	(Hungary); Aleksandr Vlasenko	
September 3	Women	(Hungary); Regina Schermann	
September 3	Pairs	(United States); Emily Chan; Spencer Akira Howe	
September 9	Men	(France); Corentin Spinar	
September 9	Women	(Italy); Marina Piredda	
September 9	Women	(Malaysia); Katherine Ong Pui Kuan	
September 9	Ice dance	(Poland); Olivia Oliver; Filip Bojanowski	
September 11	Men	(Sweden); Gabriel Folkesson	
September 13	Men	(Israel); Mark Gorodnitsky	
September 13	Ice dance	(Poland); Anastasia Polibina; Pavel Golovishnikov	

== Results ==
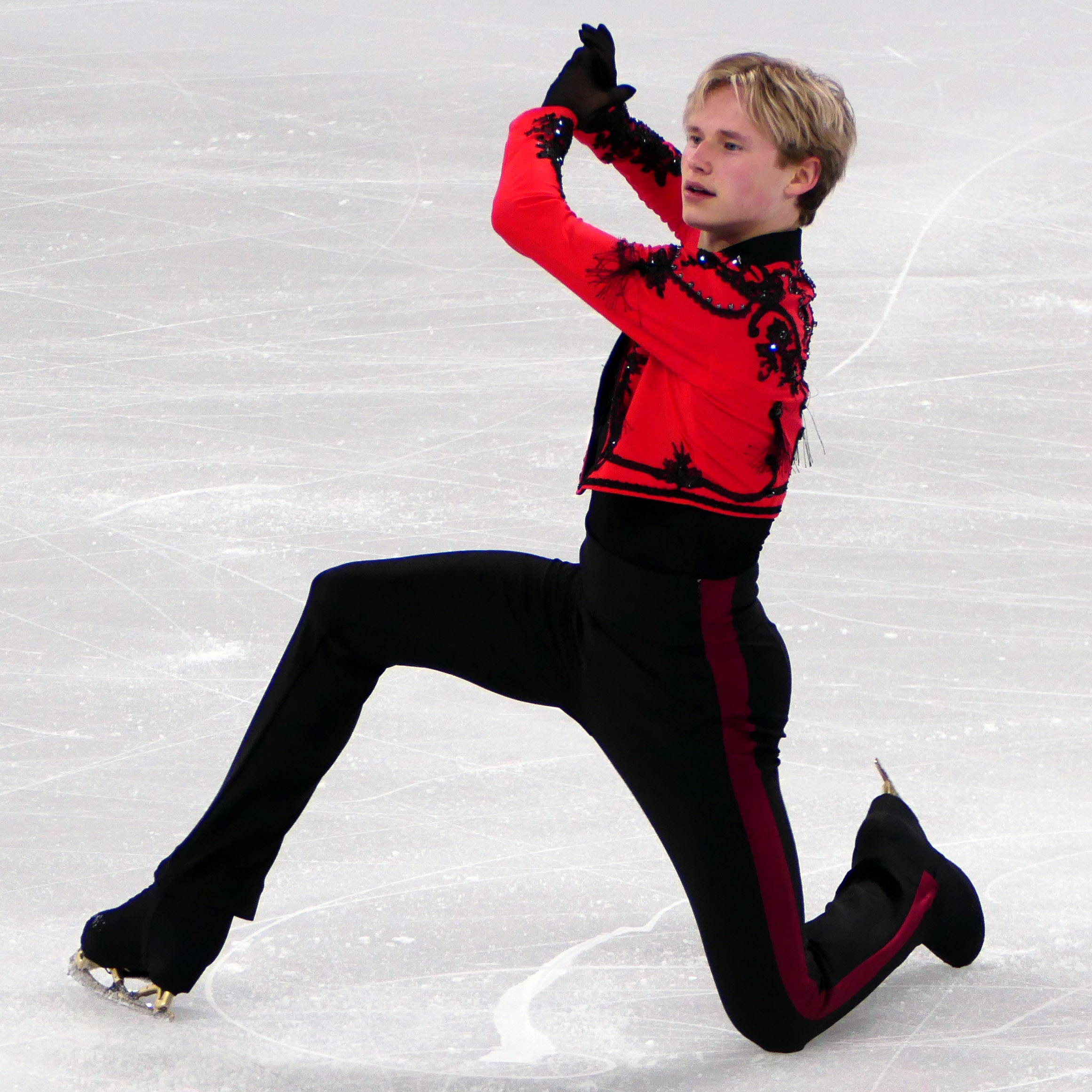
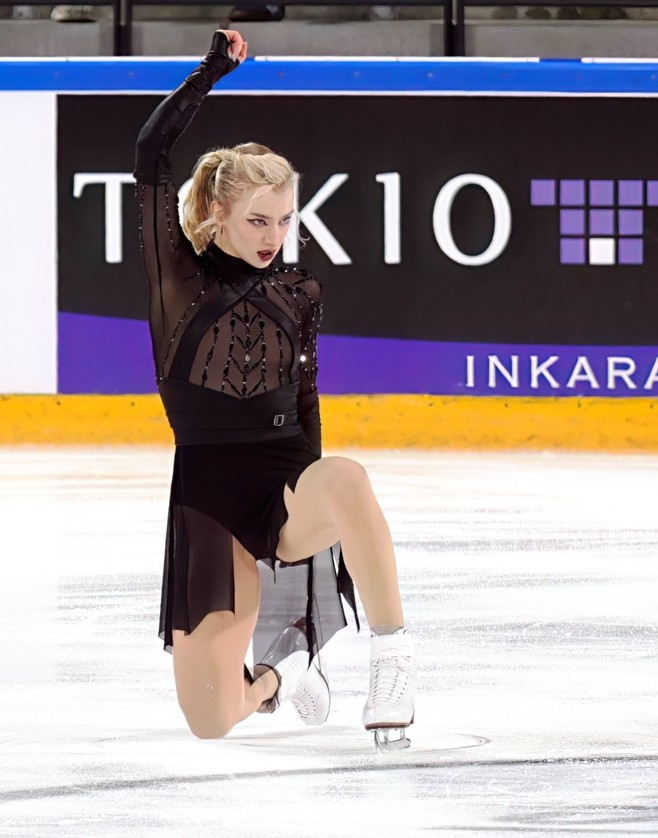
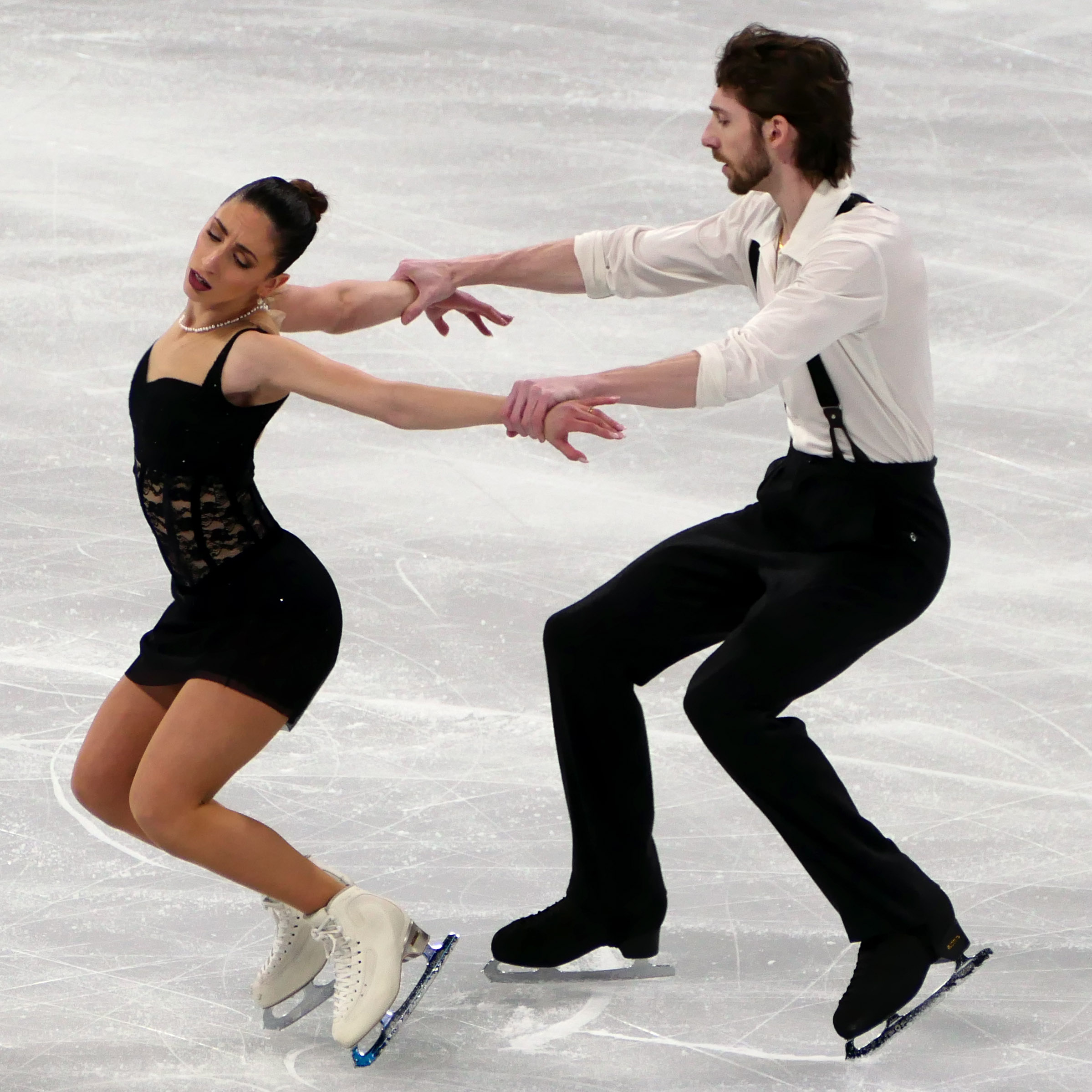
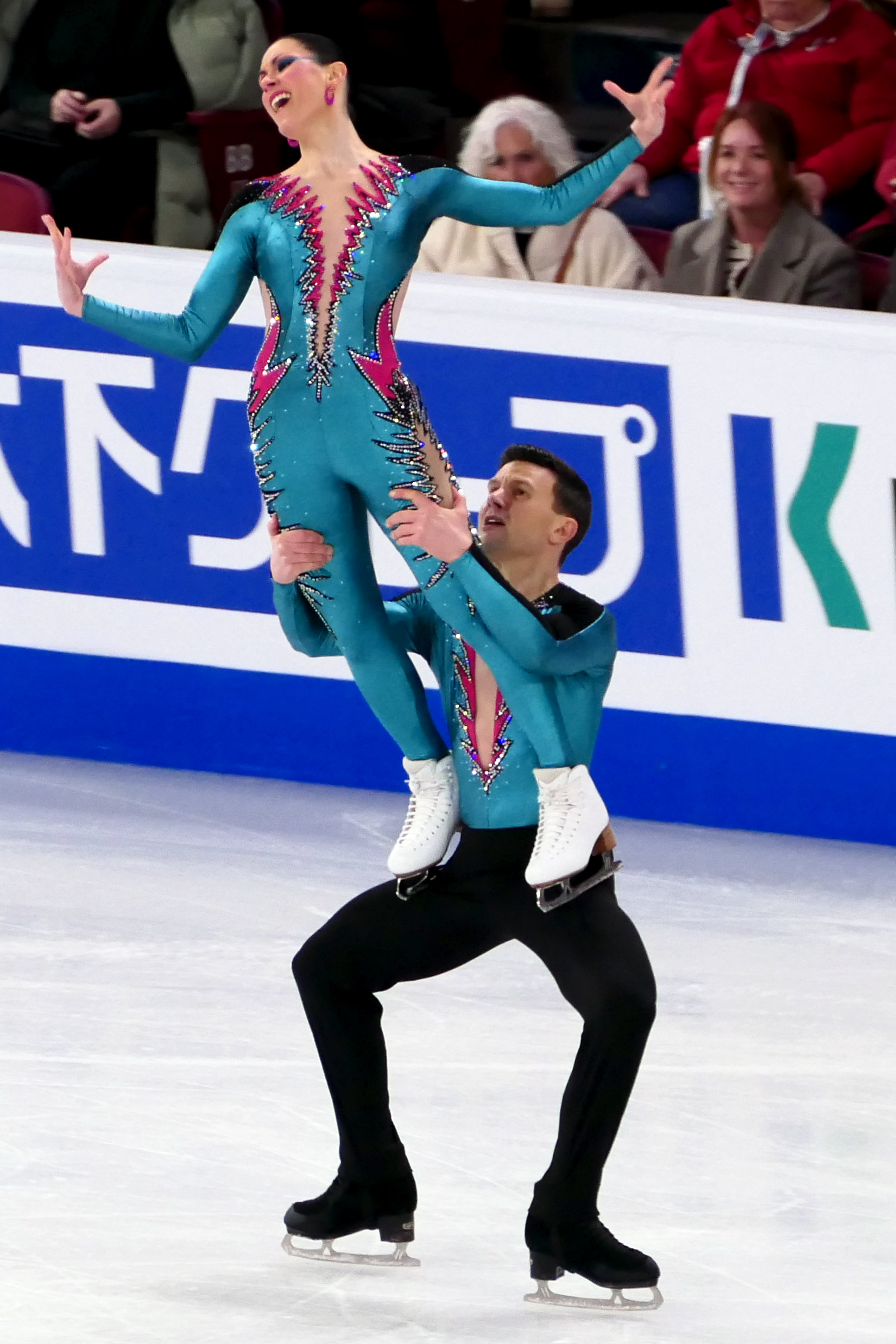
The 2024 Lombardia Trophy champions: Ilia Malinin of the United States (men's singles); Amber Glenn of the United States (women's singles); Sara Conti and Niccolò Macii of Italy (pair skating); and Charlène Guignard and Marco Fabbri of Italy (ice dance)

=== Men's singles ===
Men's results
Rank	Skater	Nation	Total points	SP		FS	
1st place, gold medalist(s)	Ilia Malinin	United States	312.55	1	107.25	1	205.30
2nd place, silver medalist(s)	Yuma Kagiyama	Japan	291.54	2	98.68	2	192.86
3rd place, bronze medalist(s)	Shun Sato	Japan	285.88	3	98.39	3	187.49
4	Kao Miura	Japan	234.75	5	76.42	4	158.33
5	Nika Egadze	Georgia	232.01	4	76.45	6	155.56
6	Jimmy Ma	United States	229.41	7	73.01	5	156.40
7	Lev Vinokur	Israel	227.79	6	75.36	7	152.43
8	Lim Ju-heon	South Korea	215.54	10	66.26	8	149.28
9	Aleksandr Selevko	Estonia	209.05	11	66.08	9	142.97
10	Daniel Martynov	United States	207.01	9	69.01	10	138.00
11	François Pitot	France	191.33	13	62.93	11	128.40
12	Xavier Vauclin	France	184.71	8	71.01	16	113.70
13	Vladimir Litvintsev	Azerbaijan	183.80	15	60.03	12	123.77
14	Ri Ju Won	North Korea	180.34	12	65.14	14	115.20
15	Ro Yong Myong	North Korea	174.46	20	51.15	13	123.31
16	Makar Suntsev	Finland	166.50	14	60.12	17	106.38
17	Alp Eren Özkan	Turkey	166.16	18	51.47	15	114.69
18	Jonathan Egyptson	Sweden	161.34	17	55.16	18	106.18
19	Connor Bray	Great Britain	152.29	16	55.32	20	96.97
20	Daniels Kockers	Lithuania	148.67	19	51.38	19	97.29
21	Chiu Hei Cheung	Hong Kong	138.04	22	42.06	21	95.98
22	Filip Kaymakchiev	Bulgaria	126.92	21	43.89	22	83.03

=== Women's singles ===
Women's results
Rank	Skater	Nation	Total points	SP		FS	
1st place, gold medalist(s)	Amber Glenn	United States	212.89	1	75.71	1	137.18
2nd place, silver medalist(s)	Sarah Everhardt	United States	201.90	3	69.13	2	132.77
3rd place, bronze medalist(s)	Kaori Sakamoto	Japan	199.94	2	73.53	4	126.41
4	Anastasiia Gubanova	Georgia	195.74	4	66.78	3	128.96
5	Anna Pezzetta	Italy	169.39	5	64.11	6	105.28
6	Kim Seo-young	South Korea	165.02	9	54.89	5	110.13
7	Niina Petrõkina	Estonia	164.98	7	60.73	7	104.25
8	Rinka Watanabe	Japan	164.04	6	61.79	8	102.25
9	Kristen Spours	Great Britain	150.69	12	49.28	9	101.41
10	Lara Naki Gutmann	Italy	150.57	8	57.06	10	93.51
11	Selma Valitalo	Finland	139.00	11	50.34	11	88.66
12	Anastasija Konga	Latvia	132.20	10	50.94	15	81.26
13	Gian-Quen Isaacs	South Africa	128.59	13	49.03	16	79.56
14	Maïa Mazzara	France	126.69	14	44.56	14	82.13
15	Oona Ounasvuori	Finland	124.99	18	42.67	13	82.32
16	Ting Tzu-Han	Chinese Taipei	123.14	17	44.04	18	79.10
17	Clemence Mayindu	France	121.31	20	36.81	12	84.50
18	Anastasia Gozhva	Ukraine	120.47	19	41.30	17	79.17
19	Eliška Březinová	Czech Republic	116.86	15	44.51	19	72.35
20	Tetiana Firsova	Ukraine	116.63	16	44.48	20	72.15

=== Pairs ===
Pairs' results
Rank	Team	Nation	Total points	SP		FS	
1st place, gold medalist(s)	Sara Conti; Niccolò Macii	Italy	203.02	1	74.67	2	128.35
2nd place, silver medalist(s)	Riku Miura; Ryuichi Kihara	Japan	199.55	2	73.53	3	126.02
3rd place, bronze medalist(s)	Maria Pavlova; Alexei Sviatchenko	Hungary	196.67	4	66.89	1	129.78
4	Rebecca Ghilardi; Filippo Ambrosini	Italy	192.47	3	69.11	4	123.36
5	Annika Hocke; Robert Kunkel	Germany	176.18	5	63.54	5	112.64
6	Ryom Tae-ok; Han Kum-chol	North Korea	143.63	8	49.37	6	94.26
7	Irma Caldara; Riccardo Maglio	Italy	138.14	6	52.73	9	85.41
8	Barbora Kuciánová; Martin Bidař	Czech Republic	136.37	7	50.13	8	86.24
9	Aurélie Faula; Théo Belle	France	135.39	9	47.88	7	87.51
10	Julia Mauder; Johannes Wilkinson	South Africa	124.49	10	44.71	10	79.78

=== Ice dance ===
Ice dance results
Rank	Team	Nation	Total points	RD		FD	
1st place, gold medalist(s)	Charlène Guignard; Marco Fabbri	Italy	215.63	1	87.45	1	128.18
2nd place, silver medalist(s)	Annabelle Morozov; Jeffrey Chen	United States	177.05	3	70.18	2	106.87
3rd place, bronze medalist(s)	Leah Neset; Artem Markelov	United States	175.33	2	70.77	4	104.56
4	Natacha Lagouge; Arnaud Caffa	France	173.52	5	68.58	3	104.94
5	Carolane Soucisse; Shane Firus	Ireland	171.34	4	69.52	6	101.82
6	Mariia Ignateva; Danijil Leonyidovics Szemko	Hungary	171.08	7	67.33	5	103.75
7	Charise Matthaei; Max Liebers	Germany	166.89	6	68.52	7	98.37
8	Lou Terreaux; Noé Perron	France	155.93	8	61.77	8	94.16
9	Leia Dozzi; Pietro Papetti	Italy	154.15	9	61.04	9	93.11
10	Giulia Isabella Paolino; Andrea Tuba	Italy	149.19	10	57.92	10	91.27
11	Carlotta Argentieri; Francesco Riva	Italy	135.17	11	52.93	12	82.24
12	Samantha Ritter; Daniel Brykalov	Azerbaijan	135.11	12	51.86	11	83.25
13	Athena Faith Roberts; Eric Alis	Spain	115.30	14	46.31	13	68.99
WD	Karla Maria Karl; Kai Hoferichter	Germany	withdrew	13	51.64	withdrew from competition	
