= 2024–25 figure skating season =

Competitive figure skating year, July 1, 2024 to June 30, 2025

- Date: July 1, 2024 – June 30, 2025
- Previous: 2023–24
- Next: 2025–26

The 2024–25 figure skating season began on July 1, 2024, and ended on June 30, 2025. During this season, elite skaters competed at the ISU Championship level at the 2025 European Championships, Four Continents Championships, World Junior Championships, and the World Championships. They also competed at elite events such as the ISU Challenger Series, the Grand Prix and Junior Grand Prix series, culminating at the Grand Prix Final.

On June 15, 2023, the International Skating Union announced that all figure skaters and officials from Russia and Belarus would remain banned from attending any international competitions.

== Season notes ==
=== Age eligibility ===
Skaters are eligible to compete in ISU events at the junior or senior levels according to their age. These rules may not apply to non-ISU events such as national championships.

Level	Date of birth
Junior (singles)	Born between July 1, 2005 & June 30, 2011
Junior (ice dance & females in pairs)	Born between July 1, 2003 & June 30, 2011
Junior (males in pairs)	Born between July 1, 2001 & June 30, 2011
Senior (all disciplines)	Born before July 1, 2007

At the ISU Congress held in Phuket, Thailand, in June 2022, members of the ISU Council accepted a proposal to gradually increase the minimum age limit for senior competition to 17 years old beginning from the 2024–25 season. To avoid forcing skaters who had already competed in the senior category to return to juniors, the age limit remained unchanged during the 2022–23 season, before increasing to 16 years old during the 2023–24 season, and will increase to 17 years old during the 2024–25 season.

At the ISU Congress held in Las Vegas in June 2024, members of the ISU Council accepted a proposal to raise the junior age limit for females in pairs and ice dance to 21 and to raise the junior age limit for males in pairs to 23. A maximum age gap of seven years was instituted for junior pairs and ice dance teams.

== Changes ==
If skaters of different nationalities form a team, the ISU requires that they choose one country to represent. The date provided is the date when the change occurred or, if not available, the date when the change was announced.

=== Partnership changes ===
Date	Skaters	Disc.	Type	Notes	Ref.
July 10, 2024	(Austria); Gabriella Izzo; Luc Maierhofer	Pairs	Formed	For Austria	
July 12, 2024	(Spain); Laura Barquero; Marco Zandron	Pairs	Split		
July 20, 2024	(Spain); Brooke McIntosh; Marco Zandron	Pairs	Formed	For Spain	
August 9, 2024	(North Korea); Ryom Tae-ok; Han Kum-chol	Pairs	Formed	For North Korea	
August 9, 2024	(Iceland); Júlía Sylvía Gunnarsdóttir; Manuel Piazza	Pairs	Formed	For Iceland	
September 23, 2024	(France); Océane Piegad; Denys Strekalin	Pairs	Split		
September 26, 2024	(Ukraine); Violetta Sierova; Ivan Khobta	Pairs	Split		
October 29, 2024	(France); Tilda Alteryd; Noël-Antoine Pierre	Pairs	Formed	For France	
October 30, 2024	(Estonia); Solène Mazingue; Marko Jevgeni Gaidajenko	Ice dance	Split		
November 22, 2024	(China); Sui Wenjing; Li Zeen	Pairs	Formed		
January 13, 2025	(Czech Republic); Barbora Kucianová; Martin Bidař	Pairs	Split		
January 13, 2025	(Czech Republic); Anna Valesi; Martin Bidař	Pairs	Formed	For Czech Republic	
February 26, 2025	(Spain); Brooke McIntosh; Marco Zandron	Pairs	Split		
March 2, 2025	(Canada); Laurence Fournier Beaudry; Nikolaj Sørensen	Ice dance	Split		
March 2, 2025	(France); Laurence Fournier Beaudry; Guillaume Cizeron	Ice dance	Formed	For France	
March 12, 2025	(Canada); Nadiia Bashynska; Peter Beaumont	Ice dance	Split		
April 11, 2025	(Finland); Milania Väänänen; Filippo Clerici	Pairs	Split		
April 22, 2025	(Japan); Sae Shimizu; Lucas Tsuyoshi Honda	Pairs	Split		
May 6, 2025	(France); Lou Terreaux; Noé Perron	Ice dance	Split		
May 9, 2025	(Israel); Shira Ichilov; Dmytriy Kravchenko	Ice dance	Split		
May 9, 2025	(Israel); Shira Ichilov; Mikhail Nosovitskiy	Ice dance	Formed		
May 9, 2025	(Japan); Ikura Kushida; Koshiro Shimada	Ice dance	Formed		
May 14, 2025	(Canada); Eliana Secunda; Thierry Ferland	Pairs	Formed	For Canada	
May 15, 2025	(Germany); Darya Grimm; Michail Savitskiy	Ice dance	Split		
June 6, 2025	(China); Sui Wenjing; Li Zeen	Pairs	Split		
June 6, 2025	(China); Sui Wenjing; Han Cong	Pairs	Formed		
June 18, 2025	(France); Megan Wessenberg; Denys Strekalin	Pairs	Formed	For France	
June 29, 2025	(Ukraine); Hannah Herrera; Ivan Khobta	Pairs	Formed	For Ukraine	

=== Retirements ===
Date	Skater(s)	Disc.	Ref.
August 17, 2024	(Netherlands); Lindsay van Zundert	Women	
October 20, 2024	(Russia); Igor Eremenko	Ice dance	
October 21, 2024	(Switzerland); Alexia Paganini	Women	
November 6, 2024	(Russia); Denis Khodykin	Pairs	
November 7, 2024	(Germany); Nathalie Weinzierl	Women	
November 17, 2024	(Hungary); Júlia Láng	Women	
November 19, 2024	(Georgia (country)); Alina Urushadze	Women	
December 3, 2024	(France); Gabriella Papadakis; Guillaume Cizeron	Ice dance	
December 22, 2024	(Japan); Yuna Shiraiwa	Women	
December 22, 2024	(Japan); Nobunari Oda	Men	
January 22, 2025	(South Korea); Choi Da-bin	Women	
January 28, 2025	(Japan); Tim Koleto	Ice dance	
February 4, 2025	(South Korea); Wi Seoyeong	Women	
February 14, 2025	(South Korea); Kim Ye-lim	Women	
April 14, 2025	(Finland); Emmi Peltonen	Women	
April 21, 2025	(Russia); Elizaveta Khudaiberdieva; Egor Bazin	Ice dance	
June 10, 2025	(Turkey); Berk Akalın	Ice dance	

=== Coaching changes ===
Date	Skater(s)	Disc.	From	To	Ref.
July 9, 2024	(Latvia); Sofja Stepčenko	Women	Olga Kovalkova	Stéphane Lambiel	
July 15, 2024	(Russia); Alexandra Trusova	Women	Svetlana Sokolovskaya	Evgeni Plushenko	
August 11, 2024	(South Korea); Kim Yu-jae	Women	Chi Hyun-jung & Kim Jin-seo	Choi Hyung-kyung	
August 13, 2024	(South Korea); Shin Ji-a	Women	Chi Hyun-jung & Kim Jin-seo	Brian Orser & Tracy Wilson	
August 14, 2024	(South Korea); Kim Yu-seong	Women	Chi Hyun-jung & Kim Jin-seo	Choi Hyung-kyung	
August 16, 2024	(Finland); Janna Jyrkinen	Women	Marina Shirshova	Alisa Drei	
August 19, 2024	(Austria); Stefanie Pesendorfer	Women	Denise Jaschek & Markus Haider	Niko Ulanovsky & Ria Schiffner	
August 28, 2024	(Germany); Darya Grimm; Michail Savitskiy	Ice dance	Rostislav Sinicyn & Natalia Karamysheva	Martin Skotnický	
September 2, 2024	(Switzerland); Naoki Rossi	Men	Uwe Kagelmann & Nicole Bettega	Chafik Besseghier	
September 8, 2024	(Kazakhstan); Sofia Samodelkina	Women	Evgeni Plushenko	Elmira Turganova	
September 15, 2024	(Norway); Mia Risa Gomez	Women	Agnes Zawadzki	Hilde Aaby & Berit Steigedal	
September 18, 2024	(Germany); Darya Grimm; Michail Savitskiy	Ice dance	Martin Skotnický	Matteo Zanni, Barbora Řezníčková & Katharina Müller	
October 4, 2024	(Canada); Kaiya Ruiter	Women	Scott Davis & Jeff Langdon	Brian Orser & Tracy Wilson	
October 4, 2024	(Israel); Mariia Seniuk	Women	Yulia Lavrenchuk	Polina Tsurskaya	
October 4, 2024	(China); Chen Yudong	Men	Li Wei & Rafael Arutyunyan	Dan Fang & Rafael Arutyunyan	
November 6, 2024	(Italy); Sarina Joos	Women	Linda van Troyen, Sindra Kriisa & Lorenzo Magri	Gheorghe Chiper	
November 6, 2024	(Germany); Darya Grimm; Michail Savitskiy	Ice dance	Matteo Zanni, Barbora Řezníčková & Katharina Müller	Matteo Zanni, Barbora Řezníčková, Katharina Müller, Maurizio Margaglio & Neil Brown	
November 7, 2024	(Philippines); Isabella Gamez; Aleksandr Korovin	Pairs	Dmitri Savin, Alexei Bychenko, Evgeni Krasnopolski & Galit Chait	Dmitri Savin & Fedor Klimov	
January 4, 2025	(Romania); Julia Sauter	Women	Marius Negrea & Roxana Hartmann	Roxana Hartmann & Christopher Boyadji	
January 14, 2025	(Italy); Raffaele Francesco Zich	Men	Edoardo De Bernardis & Renata Lazzaroni	Stéphane Lambiel & Angelo Dolfini	
January 26, 2025	(Cyprus); Marilena Kitromilis	Women	Sergei Komolov	Andrei Lutai	
February 11, 2025	(Japan); Mana Kawabe	Women	Mihoko Higuchi	Masakazu Kagiyama	
February 22, 2025	(South Korea); Shin Ji-a	Women	Brian Orser & Tracy Wilson	Brian Orser & Chi Hyun-jung	
March 26, 2025	(United Kingdom); Edward Appleby	Men	John Wicker & Alina Mayer-Virtanen	Christopher Boyadji, Lloyd Jones & Alina Mayer-Virtanen	
March 26, 2025	(South Korea); Kim Hyun-gyeom	Men	Chi Hyun-jung	Choi Hyung-kyung, Kim Na-hyun & Kim Min-seok	
April 22, 2025	(Russia); Sofia Muravieva	Women	Evgeni Plushenko & Artem Znachkov	Alexei Mishin	
May 10, 2025	(Japan); Koshiro Shimada	Ice dance	Stéphane Lambiel & Angelo Dolfini	Cathy Reed	
May 17, 2025	(Czech Republic); Natálie Taschlerová; Filip Taschler	Ice dance	Matteo Zanni, Barbora Řezníčková, Denis Loboda, Daniel Peruzzo & Marco Pipani	Maurizio Margaglio	
June 12, 2025	(France); Camille Kovalev; Pavel Kovalev	Pairs	Laurent Depouilly	Bruno Massot	
June 18, 2025	(France); Denys Strekalin	Pairs	Laurent Depouilly, Nathalie Depouilly & Dominique Deniaud	Bruno Massot, Stefania Berton & Rockne Brubaker	

=== Nationality changes ===
Date	Skater(s)	Disc.	From	To	Notes	Ref.
July 10, 2024	Gabriella Izzo	Pairs	Canada	Austria	Partnering with Luc Maierhofer	
July 20, 2024	Brooke McIntosh	Pairs	Canada	Spain	Partnering with Marco Zandron	
August 15, 2024	Manuel Piazza	Pairs	Italy	Iceland	Partnering with Júlía Sylvía Gunnarsdóttir	
August 23, 2024	Alessia Tornaghi	Women	Italy	Bosnia and Herzegovina		
January 13, 2025	Anna Valesi	Pairs	Italy	Czech Republic	Partnering with Martin Bidař	
March 2, 2025	Laurence Fournier Beaudry	Ice dance	Canada	France	Partnering with Guillaume Cizeron	
April 9, 2025	Lucrezia Gennaro	Women	Italy	Greece		

== International competitions ==
Scheduled competitions:

Code key

- S – Senior event
- J – Junior event
- N – Novice event
- M – Men's singles
- W – Women's singles
- P – Pair skating
- D – Ice dance

Color key

- ISU Championships
- Grand Prix or Junior Grand Prix
- Challenger Series
- Other competition

2024
Dates	Event	Type	Level	Disc.	Location	Ref.
July 27–29	South East Asian Open Trophy	Other	All	M/W	Manila, Philippines	
July 28–31	Lake Placid Ice Dance International	Other	S/J	D	Lake Placid, New York, United States	
August 8–11	Cranberry Cup International	Challenger Series	S	M/W	Norwood, Massachusetts, United States	
August 8–11	Cranberry Cup International	Other	J/N	M/W	Norwood, Massachusetts, United States	
August 28–31	JGP Latvia	Junior Grand Prix	J	All	Riga, Latvia	
September 2–6	Asian Open Trophy	Other	All	M/W	Kowloon Bay, Hong Kong	
September 3–4	John Nicks International Pairs Competition	Challenger Series	S	P	New York City, New York, United States	
September 3–4	John Nicks International Pairs Competition	Other	J	P	New York City, New York, United States	
September 4–7	JGP Czech Republic	Junior Grand Prix	J	All	Ostrava, Czech Republic	
September 11–14	JGP Thailand	Junior Grand Prix	J	M/W/D	Bangkok, Thailand	
September 13–15	Lombardia Trophy	Challenger Series	S	All	Bergamo, Italy	
September 18–21	JGP Turkey	Junior Grand Prix	J	All	Ankara, Turkey	
September 19–21	Nebelhorn Trophy	Challenger Series	S	All	Oberstdorf, Germany	
September 23–25	Swan Trophy	Other	All	M/W	Bibra Lake, Australia	
September 25–28	JGP Poland	Junior Grand Prix	J	All	Gdańsk, Poland	
October 2–4	Blackburn Trophy	Other		D (Note: Solo ice dance)	Blackburn, England, United Kingdom	
October 2–5	JGP Slovenia	Junior Grand Prix	J	M/W/D	Ljubljana, Slovenia	
October 3–5	Shanghai Trophy	Other	S	All	Shanghai, China	
October 3–6	Denis Ten Memorial Challenge	Challenger Series	S	M/W/D	Astana, Kazakhstan	
October 3–6	Denis Ten Memorial Challenge	Other	J	M/W/D	Astana, Kazakhstan	
October 9–12	JGP China	Junior Grand Prix	J	M/W/D	Wuxi, China	
October 11–13	Budapest Trophy	Challenger Series	S	M/W/D	Budapest, Hungary	
October 11–13	Budapest Trophy	Other	S	P	Budapest, Hungary	
October 11–13	Budapest Trophy	Other	J	All	Budapest, Hungary	
October 12–13	Tayside Trophy	Other	All	M/W/P	Dundee, Scotland, United Kingdom	
October 16–20	Trophée Métropole Nice Côte d'Azur	Challenger Series	S	M/W/D	Nice, France	
October 16–20	Trophée Métropole Nice Côte d'Azur	Other	S	P	Nice, France	
October 16–20	Trophée Métropole Nice Côte d'Azur	Other	J	M/W/D	Nice, France	
October 17–20	Diamond Spin	Other	All	M/W/P	Katowice, Poland	
October 18–20	Skate America	Grand Prix	S	All	Allen, Texas, United States	
October 23–27	Crystal Skate of Romania	Other	S/J	M/W	Otopeni, Romania	
October 24–26	Nepela Memorial	Challenger Series	S	M/W/D	Bratislava, Slovakia	
October 24–26	Northern Lights Trophy	Other	All	M/W	Reykjavík, Iceland	
October 24–27	Mezzaluna Cup	Other	All	D	Mentana, Italy	
October 25–27	Skate Canada International	Grand Prix	S	All	Halifax, Nova Scotia, Canada	
October 31 – November 3	Tirnavia Ice Cup	Other	All	M/W	Trnava, Slovakia	
October 31 – November 3	Tirnavia Ice Cup	Other	J	P	Trnava, Slovakia	
October 31 – November 3	53rd Volvo Open Cup	Other	S/J	M/W	Riga, Latvia	
November 1–3	Grand Prix de France	Grand Prix	S	All	Angers, France	
November 4–10	Ice Challenge	Other	All	All	Graz, Austria	
November 4–10	Denkova-Staviski Cup	Other	All	M/W/D	Sofia, Bulgaria	
November 8–10	NHK Trophy	Grand Prix	S	All	Tokyo, Japan	
November 8–10	Pavel Roman Memorial	Other	All	D	Olomouc, Czech Republic	
November 12–17	Tallinn Trophy	Challenger Series	S	M/W/D	Tallinn, Estonia	
November 12–17	Tallinn Trophy	Other	J/N	M/W/D	Tallinn, Estonia	
November 13–17	NRW Trophy	Other	All	All	Dortmund, Germany	
November 14–17	Skate Celje	Other	All	M/W	Celje, Slovenia	
November 15–17	Finlandia Trophy	Grand Prix	S	All	Helsinki, Finland	
November 20–24	Warsaw Cup	Challenger Series	S	All	Warsaw, Poland	
November 22–24	Cup of China	Grand Prix	S	All	Chongqing, China	
November 25 – December 1	Bosphorus Cup	Other	All	M/W/D	Istanbul, Turkey	
November 27 – December 2	Santa Claus Cup	Other	All	M/W/D	Budapest, Hungary	
November 28 – December 1	Lõunakeskus Trophy	Other	S/J	M/W	Tartu, Estonia	
December 4–7	Golden Spin of Zagreb	Challenger Series	S	All	Zagreb, Croatia	
December 5–8	Grand Prix Final	Grand Prix	S/J	All	Grenoble, France	
December 10–15	EduSport Trophy	Other	All	M/W/D	Otopeni, Romania	

2025
Dates	Event	Type	Level	Disc.	Location	Ref.
January 7–12	Sofia Trophy	Other	All	M/W/D	Sofia, Bulgaria	
January 16–18	Winter World University Games	Other	S	M/W/D	Turin, Italy	
January 16–19	54th Volvo Open Cup	Other	S/J	M/W	Riga, Latvia	
January 27 – February 2	European Championships	Championship	S	All	Tallinn, Estonia	
January 27 – February 2	Bavarian Open	Other	All	All	Oberstdorf, Germany	
January 27 – February 2	Ephesus Cup	Other	All	M/W/D	İzmir, Turkey	
January 29 – February 2	Edge Cup	Other	All	D	Katowice, Poland	
January 30 – February 2	Edge Cup	Other	J/N	All	Katowice, Poland	
January 30 – February 2	Edge Cup	Other	S	P	Katowice, Poland	
January 30 – February 2	Skate Helena	Other	All	M/W	Belgrade, Serbia	
February 6–9	Abu Dhabi Classic Trophy	Other	All	M/W	Abu Dhabi, United Arab Emirates	
February 6–9	Dragon Trophy	Other	All	M/W	Ljubljana, Slovenia	
February 6–9	Nordic Championships	Other	S/J	M/W	Asker, Norway	
February 7–9	Egna Dance Trophy	Other	All	D	Egna, Italy	
February 9–16	European Youth Olympic Festival	Other	J	M/W	Batumi, Georgia	
February 12–14	Asian Winter Games	Other	S	All	Harbin, China	
February 13–16	International Challenge Cup	Other	All	All	Tilburg, Netherlands	
February 13–16	Tallink Hotels Cup	Other	S/J	M/W	Tallinn, Estonia	
February 14–16	Merano Ice Trophy	Other	All	M/W/P	Merano, Italy	
February 19–20	Road to 26 Trophy	Other	S	All	Assago, Italy	
February 19–23	Four Continents Championships	Championship	S	All	Seoul, South Korea	
February 19–23	Bellu Memorial	Other	All	M/W	Bucharest, Romania	
February 24 – March 2	World Junior Championships	Championship	J	All	Debrecen, Hungary	
March 5–8	Maria Olszewska Memorial	Other	All	All	Łódź, Poland	
March 6–8	Denver Cup	Other	J/N	M/W	Highlands Ranch, Colorado, United States	
March 6–9	Sonja Henie Trophy	Other	All	M/W	Oslo, Norway	
March 7–9	U.S. Solo Ice Dance International	Other	All	D	Atlanta, Georgia, United States	
March 14–16	Daugava Open Cup	Other	S/J	M/W	Riga, Latvia	
March 14–16	Coupe du Printemps	Other	All	M/W	Kockelscheuer, Luxembourg	
March 24–30	World Championships	Championship	S	All	Boston, Massachusetts, United States	
March 29–30	Unicorn Dance Trophy	Other	All	D	Hoorn, Netherlands	
April 2–6	Black Sea Ice Cup	Other	All	M/W	Kranevo, Bulgaria	
April 9–13	Triglav Trophy	Other	All	M/W	Jesenice, Slovenia	
April 12–13	Helsinki Solo Ice Dance International	Other	All	D	Helsinki, Finland	
April 17–20	World Team Trophy	Other	S	All	Tokyo, Japan	
May 1–4	Thailand Open Trophy	Other	All	M/W	Bangkok, Thailand	
May 12–18	Mexico Cup	Other	All	M/W	Mexico City, Mexico	
May 26–28	Oceania International	Other	All	M/W	Melbourne, Australia	

=== Cancelled ===
2024–25
Dates	Event	Type	Location	Ref.
September 12–15	Jelgava Cup	Other	Jelgava, Latvia	
October 5	Japan Open	Other	Saitama, Japan	
October 31 – November 3	Swiss Open	Other	Lausanne, Switzerland	
December 4–8	Magic Christmas Cup	Other	Otopeni, Romania	
December 13–15	Sarajevo Trophy	Other	Sarajevo, Bosnia and Herzegovina	
January 23–26	Reykjavik International Games	Other	Reykjavík, Iceland	
February 5–9	Skate Dortmund	Other	Dortmund, Germany	
February 19–23	Skate Berlin	Other	Berlin, Germany	

== International medalists ==
=== Men's singles ===
Championships
Competition	Gold	Silver	Bronze	Ref.
(Estonia) European Championships	(Switzerland) Lukas Britschgi	(Italy) Nikolaj Memola	(France) Adam Siao Him Fa	
(South Korea) Four Continents Championships	(Kazakhstan) Mikhail Shaidorov	(South Korea) Cha Jun-hwan	(United States) Jimmy Ma	
(Hungary) World Junior Championships	(Japan) Rio Nakata	(South Korea) Seo Min-kyu	(Slovakia) Adam Hagara	
(United States) World Championships	(United States) Ilia Malinin	(Kazakhstan) Mikhail Shaidorov	(Japan) Yuma Kagiyama	

Grand Prix
Competition	Gold	Silver	Bronze	Ref.
(United States) Skate America	(United States) Ilia Malinin	(France) Kévin Aymoz	(Japan) Kao Miura	
Skate Canada International	(United States) Ilia Malinin	(Japan) Shun Sato	(South Korea) Cha Jun-hwan	
Grand Prix de France	(France) Adam Siao Him Fa	(Japan) Koshiro Shimada	(United States) Andrew Torgashev	
(Japan) NHK Trophy	(Japan) Yuma Kagiyama	(Italy) Daniel Grassl	(Japan) Tatsuya Tsuboi	
(Finland) Finlandia Trophy	(Japan) Yuma Kagiyama	(France) Kévin Aymoz	(Italy) Daniel Grassl	
Cup of China	(Japan) Shun Sato	(Kazakhstan) Mikhail Shaidorov	(France) Adam Siao Him Fa	
(France) Grand Prix Final	(United States) Ilia Malinin	(Japan) Yuma Kagiyama	(Japan) Shun Sato	

Junior Grand Prix
Competition	Gold	Silver	Bronze	Ref.
JGP Latvia	(Japan) Sena Takahashi	(South Korea) Lee Jae-keun	(Japan) Shunsuke Nakamura	
JGP Czech Republic	(South Korea) Seo Min-kyu	(United States) Patrick Blackwell	(Slovakia) Adam Hagara	
JGP Thailand	(New Zealand) Yanhao Li	(Japan) Rio Nakata	(China) Tian Tonghe	
JGP Turkey	(United States) Jacob Sanchez	(Japan) Shunsuke Nakamura	(Estonia) Arlet Levandi	
JGP Poland	(Slovakia) Lukáš Václavík	(Japan) Sena Takahashi	(South Korea) Seo Min-kyu	
JGP Slovenia	(United States) Jacob Sanchez	(Slovakia) Adam Hagara	(Germany) Genrikh Gartung	
JGP China	(Japan) Rio Nakata	(China) Tian Tonghe	(New Zealand) Yanhao Li	
(France) Junior Grand Prix Final	(United States) Jacob Sanchez	(South Korea) Seo Min-kyu	(Japan) Rio Nakata	

Challenger Series
Competition	Gold	Silver	Bronze	Ref.
(United States) Cranberry Cup International	(United States) Lucas Broussard	(France) Luc Economides	(United States) Jimmy Ma	
(Italy) Lombardia Trophy	(United States) Ilia Malinin	(Japan) Yuma Kagiyama	(Japan) Shun Sato	
(Germany) Nebelhorn Trophy	(Japan) Sōta Yamamoto	(Italy) Gabriele Frangipani	(Latvia) Deniss Vasiļjevs	
(Kazakhstan) Denis Ten Memorial Challenge	(Kazakhstan) Mikhail Shaidorov	(Azerbaijan) Vladimir Litvintsev	(Georgia (country)) Nika Egadze	
(Hungary) Budapest Trophy	(Italy) Matteo Rizzo	(Switzerland) Lukas Britschgi	(Germany) Nikita Starostin	
(France) Trophée Métropole Nice Côte d'Azur	(France) Adam Siao Him Fa	(Switzerland) Lukas Britschgi	(Estonia) Mihhail Selevko	
(Slovakia) Nepela Memorial	(Italy) Daniel Grassl	(Italy) Nikolaj Memola	(Italy) Corey Circelli	
(Estonia) Tallinn Trophy	(United States) Jacob Sanchez	(United States) Daniel Martynov	(Canada) Roman Sadovsky	
(Poland) Warsaw Cup	(Poland) Vladimir Samoilov	(Italy) Gabriele Frangipani	(Ukraine) Ivan Shmuratko	
(Croatia) Golden Spin of Zagreb	(Estonia) Mihhail Selevko	(Estonia) Aleksandr Selevko	(France) François Pitot	

Other international competitions
Competition	Gold	Silver	Bronze	Ref.
(Philippines) South East Asian Open Trophy	(Hong Kong) Lap Kan Lincoln Yuen	—N/a		
(Hong Kong) Asian Open Trophy	(South Korea) Lee Si-hyeong	(China) Dai Daiwei	(Japan) Nozomu Yoshioka	
(China) Shanghai Trophy	(South Korea) Cha Jun-hwan	(Latvia) Deniss Vasiļjevs	(United States) Jason Brown	
(United Kingdom) Tayside Trophy	(Austria) Maurizio Zandron	(Italy) Corey Circelli	(Spain) Tomàs-Llorenç Guarino Sabaté	
(Poland) Diamond Spin	(Poland) Kornel Witkowski	(Poland) Jakub Lofek	(Spain) Adrián Jiménez de Baldomero	
Crystal Skate of Romania	(Bulgaria) Beat Schümperli	(Bulgaria) Alexander Zlatkov	(Bulgaria) Larry Loupolover	
(Iceland) Northern Lights Trophy	(Hong Kong) Chiu Hei Cheung	—N/a		
(Slovakia) Tirnavia Ice Cup	(Germany) Tim England	(Poland) Jakub Lofek	(Lithuania) Daniel Korabelnik	
(Latvia) 53rd Volvo Open Cup	(Estonia) Arlet Levandi	(Israel) Lev Vinokur	(Finland) Arttu Juusola	
(Austria) Ice Challenge	(Slovenia) David Sedej	(Austria) Anton Skoficz	—N/a	
(Bulgaria) Denkova-Staviski Cup	(Israel) Lev Vinokur	(Austria) Maurizio Zandron	(Turkey) Burak Demirboğa	
(Germany) NRW Trophy	(Israel) Lev Vinokur	(Mexico) Donovan Carrillo	(Switzerland) Noah Bodenstein	
(Slovenia) Skate Celje	(Switzerland) Aurélian Chervet	(Czech Republic) Petr Kotlařík	(Austria) Anton Skoficz	
(Turkey) Bosphorus Cup	(Azerbaijan) Vladimir Litvintsev	(Turkey) Burak Demirboğa	(Turkey) Alp Eren Özkan	
(Hungary) Santa Claus Cup	(Chinese Taipei) Li Yu-Hsiang	(Monaco) Davide Lewton Brain	(Hungary) Aleksandr Vlasenko	
(Estonia) Lõunakeskus Trophy	(Finland) Jan Ollikainen	(Finland) Jari Krestyannikov	(Republic of Ireland) Dillon Judge	
(Romania) EduSport Trophy	(Bulgaria) Beat Schümperli	(United Kingdom) Connor Bray	(Portugal) David Gouveia	
(Bulgaria) Sofia Trophy	(Slovakia) Adam Hagara	(China) Peng Zhiming	(Bulgaria) Alexander Zlatkov	
(Latvia) 54th Volvo Open Cup	(Latvia) Fedir Kulish	(Poland) Vladimir Samoilov	(Croatia) Jari Kessler	
(Italy) Winter World University Games	(Japan) Yuma Kagiyama	(Italy) Daniel Grassl	(South Korea) Cha Jun-hwan	
(Turkey) Ephesus Cup	(Turkey) Alp Eren Özkan	(Turkey) Başar Oktar	—N/a	
(Germany) Bavarian Open	(Italy) Gabriele Frangipani	(Mexico) Donovan Carrillo	(Italy) Raffaele Zich	
(Serbia) Skate Helena	(Switzerland) Nico Steffen	(Finland) Makar Suntsev	(Bulgaria) Filip Kaymakchiev	
(United Arab Emirates) Abu Dhabi Classic Trophy	(Finland) Valtter Virtanen	(Kazakhstan) Oleg Melnikov	—N/a	
(Slovenia) Dragon Trophy	(Croatia) Jari Kessler	(Slovenia) David Sedej	—N/a	
(Norway) Nordic Championships	(Sweden) Casper Johansson	(Finland) Arttu Juusola	(Finland) Jan Ollikainen	
(China) Asian Winter Games	(South Korea) Cha Jun-hwan	(Japan) Yuma Kagiyama	(Kazakhstan) Mikhail Shaidorov	
(Netherlands) International Challenge Cup	(Japan) Sena Miyake	(Mexico) Donovan Carrillo	(Israel) Mark Gorodnitsky	
(Estonia) Tallink Hotels Cup	(Estonia) Arlet Levandi	(Finland) Valtter Virtanen	(Finland) Makar Suntsev	
(Italy) Merano Ice Trophy	(Spain) Tomàs-Llorenç Guarino Sabaté	(Finland) Valtter Virtanen	(Croatia) Jari Kessler	
(Italy) Road to 26 Trophy	(France) Kévin Aymoz	(Italy) Nikolaj Memola	(Japan) Sōta Yamamoto	
(Romania) Bellu Memorial	(Italy) Matteo Rizzo	(Croatia) Jari Kessler	(Austria) Maurizio Zandron	
(Poland) Maria Olszewska Memorial	(Poland) Kornel Witkowski	(Italy) Matteo Nalbone	(United States) Emmanuel Savary	
(Norway) Sonja Henie Trophy	(France) Adam Siao Him Fa	(Italy) Matteo Rizzo	(Estonia) Mihhail Selevko	
(Latvia) Daugava Open Cup	(Latvia) Fedir Kulish	(Italy) Raffaele Zich	(Lithuania) Daniel Korabelnik	
(Luxembourg) Coupe du Printemps	(France) François Pitot	(France) Corentin Spinar	(France) Ilia Gogitidze	
(Bulgaria) Black Sea Ice Cup	(Italy) Matteo Nalbone	(Bulgaria) Filip Kaimakchiev	(Bulgaria) Larry Loupolover	
(Slovenia) Triglav Trophy	(Estonia) Jegor Martsenko	(Spain) Pablo García	—N/a	
Thailand Open Trophy	(Chinese Taipei) Li Yu-Hsiang	(Australia) Douglas Gerber	(Malaysia) Ze Zeng Fang	
Mexico Cup	(Brazil) Arthur Alcorte	(Ecuador) Gabriel Martinez	(Mexico) Emilio Mariscal Pacheco	
(Australia) Oceania International	(Australia) Douglas Gerber	—N/a		

=== Women's singles ===
Championships
Competition	Gold	Silver	Bronze	Ref.
(Estonia) European Championships	(Estonia) Niina Petrõkina	(Georgia (country)) Anastasiia Gubanova	(Belgium) Nina Pinzarrone	
(South Korea) Four Continents Championships	(South Korea) Kim Chae-yeon	(United States) Bradie Tennell	(United States) Sarah Everhardt	
(Hungary) World Junior Championships	(Japan) Mao Shimada	(South Korea) Shin Ji-a	(United States) Elyce Lin-Gracey	
(United States) World Championships	(United States) Alysa Liu	(Japan) Kaori Sakamoto	(Japan) Mone Chiba	

Grand Prix
Competition	Gold	Silver	Bronze	Ref.
(United States) Skate America	(Japan) Wakaba Higuchi	(Japan) Rinka Watanabe	(United States) Isabeau Levito	
Skate Canada International	(Japan) Kaori Sakamoto	(Japan) Rino Matsuike	(Japan) Hana Yoshida	
Grand Prix de France	(United States) Amber Glenn	(Japan) Wakaba Higuchi	(Japan) Rion Sumiyoshi	
(Japan) NHK Trophy	(Japan) Kaori Sakamoto	(Japan) Mone Chiba	(Japan) Yuna Aoki	
(Finland) Finlandia Trophy	(Japan) Hana Yoshida	(Japan) Rino Matsuike	(Italy) Lara Naki Gutmann	
Cup of China	(United States) Amber Glenn	(Japan) Mone Chiba	(South Korea) Kim Chae-yeon	
(France) Grand Prix Final	(United States) Amber Glenn	(Japan) Mone Chiba	(Japan) Kaori Sakamoto	

Junior Grand Prix
Competition	Gold	Silver	Bronze	Ref.
JGP Latvia	(Japan) Mao Shimada	(Estonia) Elina Goidina	(South Korea) Ko Na-yeon	
JGP Czech Republic	(Japan) Kaoruko Wada	(France) Stefania Gladki	(South Korea) Kim Yu-jae	
JGP Thailand	(China) Wang Yihan	(Japan) Yo Takagi	(Japan) Mei Okada	
JGP Turkey	(South Korea) Kim Yu-seong	(Japan) Ami Nakai	(France) Stefania Gladki	
JGP Poland	(Japan) Mao Shimada	(Japan) Kaoruko Wada	(South Korea) Ko Na-yeon	
JGP Slovenia	(United States) Sophie Joline von Felten	(South Korea) Shin Ji-a	(Japan) Mei Okada	
JGP China	(Japan) Ami Nakai	(South Korea) Kim Yu-seong	(China) Wang Yihan	
(France) Junior Grand Prix Final	(Japan) Mao Shimada	(Japan) Kaoruko Wada	(Japan) Ami Nakai	

Challenger Series
Competition	Gold	Silver	Bronze	Ref.
(United States) Cranberry Cup International	(United States) Sarah Everhardt	(United States) Elyce Lin-Gracey	(United States) Isabeau Levito	
(Italy) Lombardia Trophy	(United States) Amber Glenn	(United States) Sarah Everhardt	(Japan) Kaori Sakamoto	
(Germany) Nebelhorn Trophy	(United States) Elyce Lin-Gracey	(United States) Isabeau Levito	(Japan) Hana Yoshida	
(Kazakhstan) Denis Ten Memorial Challenge	(Georgia (country)) Anastasiia Gubanova	(Kazakhstan) Sofia Samodelkina	(Italy) Lara Naki Gutmann	
(Hungary) Budapest Trophy	(United States) Alysa Liu	(Switzerland) Kimmy Repond	(France) Lorine Schild	
(France) Trophée Métropole Nice Côte d'Azur	(South Korea) Kim Chae-yeon	(Estonia) Niina Petrõkina	(Canada) Fée Ann Landry	
(Slovakia) Nepela Memorial	(South Korea) Yun Ah-sun	(Israel) Mariia Seniuk	(Italy) Lara Naki Gutmann	
(Estonia) Tallinn Trophy	(Belgium) Nina Pinzarrone	(Kazakhstan) Sofia Samodelkina	(Canada) Sara-Maude Dupuis	
(Poland) Warsaw Cup	(Canada) Katherine Medland Spence	(Poland) Ekaterina Kurakova	(Italy) Marina Piredda	
(Croatia) Golden Spin of Zagreb	(United States) Alysa Liu	(Belgium) Nina Pinzarrone	(United States) Bradie Tennell	

Other international competitions
Competition	Gold	Silver	Bronze	Ref.
(Philippines) South East Asian Open Trophy	(Philippines) Sofia Frank	(Indonesia) Kelly Supangat	(Philippines) Skye Chua	
(Hong Kong) Asian Open Trophy	(China) An Xiangyi	(Japan) Mako Yamashita	(Japan) Mai Mihara	
(Australia) Swan Trophy	(Australia) Ashley Colliver	(Australia) Abbey Williams	—N/a	
(China) Shanghai Trophy	(South Korea) Kim Chae-yeon	(United States) Bradie Tennell	(Belgium) Loena Hendrickx	
(United Kingdom) Tayside Trophy	(Israel) Mariia Seniuk	(United States) Brooke Gewalt	(France) Clémence Mayindu	
(Poland) Diamond Spin	(Germany) Kristina Isaev	(Czech Republic) Eliška Březinová	(Poland) Karolina Białas	
Crystal Skate of Romania	(Romania) Julia Sauter	(Italy) Elena Agostinelli	(Czech Republic) Eliška Březinová	
(Iceland) Northern Lights Trophy	(Norway) Linnea Kilsand	(Poland) Marietta Atkins	(Norway) Mia Risa Gomez	
(Slovakia) Tirnavia Ice Cup	(Slovakia) Vanesa Šelmeková	(Czech Republic) Eliška Březinová	(Netherlands) Niki Wories	
(Latvia) 53rd Volvo Open Cup	(Latvia) Anastasija Konga	(Estonia) Kristina Lisovskaja	(Finland) Oona Ounasvuori	
(Austria) Ice Challenge	(Italy) Anna Pezzetta	(Slovenia) Julija Lovrenčič	(Germany) Sarah Marie Pesch	
(Bulgaria) Denkova-Staviski Cup	(United Kingdom) Kristen Spours	(Bulgaria) Alexandra Feigin	(Italy) Carlotta Gardini	
(Germany) NRW Trophy	(Israel) Mariia Seniuk	(Netherlands) Niki Wories	(Germany) Anna Grekul	
(Slovenia) Skate Celje	(United Kingdom) Nina Povey	(India) Tara Prasad	(Austria) Emily Saari	
(Turkey) Bosphorus Cup	(Bulgaria) Alexandra Feigin	(Moldova) Anastasia Gracheva	(Czech Republic) Eliška Březinová	
(Hungary) Santa Claus Cup	(United States) Starr Andrews	(Netherlands) Niki Wories	(United States) Sonja Hilmer	
(Estonia) Lõunakeskus Trophy	(Finland) Linnea Ceder	(Finland) Minja Peltonen	(Czech Republic) Michaela Vrašťáková	
(Romania) EduSport Trophy	(Lithuania) Meda Variakojytė	(Italy) Carlotta Gardini	(Serbia) Antonina Dubinina	
(Bulgaria) Sofia Trophy	(Bulgaria) Alexandra Feigin	(United Kingdom) Kristen Spours	(Romania) Julia Sauter	
(Latvia) 54th Volvo Open Cup	(Finland) Olivia Lisko	(Lithuania) Meda Variakojytė	(Norway) Mia Risa Gomez	
(Italy) Winter World University Games	(Japan) Rion Sumiyoshi	(Japan) Mone Chiba	(Kazakhstan) Sofia Samodelkina	
(Turkey) Ephesus Cup	(Turkey) Salma Agamova	(Turkey) Ceyda Sağlam	(Turkey) Fatma Yade Karlıklı	
(Germany) Bavarian Open	(France) Léa Serna	(Finland) Nella Pelkonen	(Austria) Stefanie Pesendorfer	
(Serbia) Skate Helena	(Moldova) Anastasia Gracheva	(Switzerland) Ophélie Clerc	(Latvia) Sofja Stepčenko	
(United Arab Emirates) Abu Dhabi Classic Trophy	(Czech Republic) Michaela Vrašťáková	(Turkey) Salma Agamova	(Kazakhstan) Anna Levkovets	
(Slovenia) Dragon Trophy	(Italy) Marina Piredda	(Italy) Ginevra Negrello	(Slovenia) Julija Lovrenčič	
(Norway) Nordic Championships	(Finland) Olivia Lisko	(Finland) Linnea Ceder	(Sweden) Josefin Taljegård	
(China) Asian Winter Games	(South Korea) Kim Chae-yeon	(Japan) Kaori Sakamoto	(Japan) Hana Yoshida	
(Netherlands) International Challenge Cup	(Japan) Rinka Watanabe	(Japan) Rion Sumiyoshi	(Japan) Mako Yamashita	
(Estonia) Tallink Hotels Cup	(Sweden) Josefin Taljegård	(Finland) Minja Peltonen	(Finland) Selma Valitalo	
(Italy) Merano Ice Trophy	(Austria) Stefanie Pesendorfer	(Germany) Anna Grekul	(Poland) Marietta Atkins	
(Italy) Road to 26 Trophy	(Estonia) Niina Petrõkina	(United States) Isabeau Levito	(Italy) Lara Naki Gutmann	
(Romania) Bellu Memorial	(Finland) Linnea Ceder	(Sweden) Josefin Taljegård	(Finland) Olivia Lisko	
(Poland) Maria Olszewska Memorial	(United States) Bradie Tennell	(United Kingdom) Kristen Spours	(Italy) Marina Piredda	
(Norway) Sonja Henie Trophy	(Italy) Lara Naki Gutmann	(Finland) Olivia Lisko	(Estonia) Nataly Langerbaur	
(Latvia) Daugava Open Cup	(Finland) Selma Valitalo	(Estonia) Kristina Lisovskaja	(Finland) Oona Ounasvuori	
(Luxembourg) Coupe du Printemps	(Estonia) Eva Lotta Kiibus	(Italy) Ginevra Lavinia Negrello	(Netherlands) Niki Wories	
(Bulgaria) Black Sea Ice Cup	(Cyprus) Marilena Kitromilis	(Moldova) Anastasia Gracheva	(United Kingdom) Nina Povey	
(Slovenia) Triglav Trophy	(Italy) Marina Piredda	(Greece) Lucrezia Gennaro	(Italy) Ginevra Lavinia Negrello	
Thailand Open Trophy	(Australia) Ashley Colliver	(Kazakhstan) Russalina Shakrova	(Hong Kong) Joanna So	
Mexico Cup	(Australia) Victoria Alcantara	(Mexico) Alejandra Osuna Tirado	(Chinese Taipei) Mya Li Poe	
(Australia) Oceania International	(Australia) Victoria Alcantara	(Australia) Athena Avci	(Australia) Emily-Jean Kelly	

=== Pairs ===
Championships
Competition	Gold	Silver	Bronze	Ref.
(Estonia) European Championships	(Germany); Minerva Fabienne Hase; Nikita Volodin	(Italy); Sara Conti; Niccolò Macii	(Georgia (country)); Anastasiia Metelkina; Luka Berulava	
(South Korea) Four Continents Championships	(Japan); Riku Miura; Ryuichi Kihara	(Canada); Deanna Stellato-Dudek; Maxime Deschamps	(Canada); Lia Pereira; Trennt Michaud	
(Hungary) World Junior Championships	(Georgia (country)); Anastasiia Metelkina; Luka Berulava	(Ukraine); Sofiia Holichenko; Artem Darenskyi	(Canada); Martina Ariano Kent; Charly Laliberté-Laurent	
(United States) World Championships	(Japan); Riku Miura; Ryuichi Kihara	(Germany); Minerva Fabienne Hase; Nikita Volodin	(Italy); Sara Conti; Niccolò Macii	

Grand Prix
Competition	Gold	Silver	Bronze	Ref.
(United States) Skate America	(Japan); Riku Miura; Ryuichi Kihara	(United States); Ellie Kam; Danny O'Shea	(United States); Alisa Efimova; Misha Mitrofanov	
Skate Canada International	(Canada); Deanna Stellato-Dudek; Maxime Deschamps	(Uzbekistan); Ekaterina Geynish; Dmitrii Chigirev	(Australia); Anastasia Golubeva; Hektor Giotopoulos Moore	
Grand Prix de France	(Germany); Minerva Fabienne Hase; Nikita Volodin	(Italy); Sara Conti; Niccolò Macii	(Italy); Rebecca Ghilardi; Filippo Ambrosini	
(Japan) NHK Trophy	(Georgia (country)); Anastasiia Metelkina; Luka Berulava	(Japan); Riku Miura; Ryuichi Kihara	(United States); Ellie Kam; Danny O'Shea	
(Finland) Finlandia Trophy	(Canada); Deanna Stellato-Dudek; Maxime Deschamps	(Hungary); Maria Pavlova; Alexei Sviatchenko	(Italy); Rebecca Ghilardi; Filippo Ambrosini	
Cup of China	(Italy); Sara Conti; Niccolò Macii	(Germany); Minerva Fabienne Hase; Nikita Volodin	(Canada); Lia Pereira; Trennt Michaud	
(France) Grand Prix Final	(Germany); Minerva Fabienne Hase; Nikita Volodin	(Japan); Riku Miura; Ryuichi Kihara	(Georgia (country)); Anastasiia Metelkina; Luka Berulava	

Junior Grand Prix
Competition	Gold	Silver	Bronze	Ref.
JGP Latvia	(China); Zhang Jiaxuan; Huang Yihang	(Canada); Jazmine Desrochers; Kieran Thrasher	(United States); Olivia Flores; Luke Wang	
JGP Czech Republic	(China); Zhang Xuanqi; Feng Wenqiang	(France); Romane Telemaque; Lucas Coulon	(Canada); Julia Quattrocchi; Simon Desmarais	
JGP Turkey	(Canada); Jazmine Desrochers; Kieran Thrasher	(United States); Olivia Flores; Luke Wang	(Japan); Sae Shimizu; Lucas Tsuyoshi Honda	
JGP Poland	(China); Zhang Jiaxuan; Huang Yihang	(Ukraine); Sofiia Holichenko; Artem Darenskyi	(Canada); Julia Quattrocchi; Simon Desmarais	
(France) Junior Grand Prix Final	(China); Zhang Jiaxuan; Huang Yihang	(United States); Olivia Flores; Luke Wang	(Canada); Jazmine Desrochers; Kieran Thrasher	

Challenger Series
Competition	Gold	Silver	Bronze	Ref.
(United States) John Nicks International Pairs Competition	(United States); Ellie Kam; Danny O'Shea	(United States); Alisa Efimova; Misha Mitrofanov	(Uzbekistan); Ekaterina Geynish; Dmitrii Chigirev	
(Italy) Lombardia Trophy	(Italy); Sara Conti; Niccolò Macii	(Japan); Riku Miura; Ryuichi Kihara	(Hungary); Maria Pavlova; Alexei Sviatchenko	
(Germany) Nebelhorn Trophy	(Germany); Minerva Fabienne Hase; Nikita Volodin	(Canada); Deanna Stellato-Dudek; Maxime Deschamps	(United States); Ellie Kam; Danny O'Shea	
(Poland) Warsaw Cup	(Georgia (country)); Anastasiia Metelkina; Luka Berulava	(United Kingdom); Anastasia Vaipan-Law; Luke Digby	(Canada); Fiona Bombardier; Benjamin Mimar	
(Croatia) Golden Spin of Zagreb	(Poland); Ioulia Chtchetinina; Michał Woźniak	(United States); Emily Chan; Spencer Howe	(United States); Audrey Shin; Balázs Nagy	

Other international competitions
Competition	Gold	Silver	Bronze	Ref.
(China) Shanghai Trophy	(Hungary); Maria Pavlova; Alexei Sviatchenko	(Italy); Lucrezia Beccari; Matteo Guarise	(China); Yang Yixi; Deng Shunyang	
(United Kingdom) Tayside Trophy	(Italy); Sara Conti; Niccolò Macii	(United Kingdom); Anastasia Vaipan-Law; Luke Digby	(United States); Naomi Williams; Lachlan Lewer	
(France) Trophée Métropole Nice Côte d'Azur	(Germany); Minerva Fabienne Hase; Nikita Volodin	(Philippines); Isabella Gamez; Aleksandr Korovin	(France); Louise Ehrhard; Matthis Pellegris	
(Poland) Diamond Spin	(Italy); Rebecca Ghilardi; Filippo Ambrosini	(Poland); Ioulia Chtchetinina; Michał Woźniak	(Italy); Irma Caldara; Riccardo Maglio	
(Austria) Ice Challenge	(Austria); Gabriella Izzo; Luc Maierhofer	(United States); Nica Digerness; Mark Sadusky	(United States); Linzy Fitzpatrick; Keyton Bearinger	
(Germany) NRW Trophy	(Switzerland); Oxana Vouillamoz; Tom Bouvart	(Sweden); Greta Crafoord; John Crafoord	(Iceland); Júlía Sylvía Gunnarsdóttir; Manuel Piazza	
(Germany) Bavarian Open	(France); Aurelie Faula; Théo Belle	(Sweden); Greta Crafoord; John Crafoord	(Austria); Sophia Schaller; Livio Mayr	
(China) Asian Winter Games	(Uzbekistan); Ekaterina Geynish; Dmitrii Chigirev	(North Korea); Ryom Tae-ok; Han Kum-chol	(Japan); Yuna Nagaoka; Sumitada Moriguchi	
(Netherlands) International Challenge Cup	(Georgia (country)); Anastasiia Metelkina; Luka Berulava	(Netherlands); Daria Danilova; Michel Tsiba	(Poland); Ioulia Chtchetinina; Michał Woźniak	
(Italy) Merano Ice Trophy	(Italy); Irma Caldara; Riccardo Maglio	(Czech Republic); Anna Valesi; Martin Bidař	(Austria); Gabriella Izzo; Luc Maierhofer	
(Italy) Road to 26 Trophy	(Italy); Rebecca Ghilardi; Filippo Ambrosini	(United States); Katie McBeath; Daniil Parkman	(Ukraine); Sofiia Holichenko; Artem Darenskyi	

=== Ice dance ===
Championships
Competition	Gold	Silver	Bronze	Ref.
(Estonia) European Championships	(Italy); Charlène Guignard; Marco Fabbri	(France); Evgeniia Lopareva; Geoffrey Brissaud	(United Kingdom); Lilah Fear; Lewis Gibson	
(South Korea) Four Continents Championships	(Canada); Piper Gilles; Paul Poirier	(United States); Madison Chock; Evan Bates	(Canada); Marjorie Lajoie; Zachary Lagha	
(Hungary) World Junior Championships	(Italy); Noemi Tali; Noah Lafornara	(United States); Katarina Wolfkostin; Dimitry Tsarevski	(Germany); Darya Grimm; Michail Savitskiy	
(United States) World Championships	(United States); Madison Chock; Evan Bates	(Canada); Piper Gilles; Paul Poirier	(United Kingdom); Lilah Fear; Lewis Gibson	

Grand Prix
Competition	Gold	Silver	Bronze	Ref.
(United States) Skate America	(United Kingdom); Lilah Fear; Lewis Gibson	(United States); Madison Chock; Evan Bates	(Spain); Olivia Smart; Tim Dieck	
Skate Canada International	(Canada); Piper Gilles; Paul Poirier	(Canada); Marjorie Lajoie; Zachary Lagha	(France); Evgeniia Lopareva; Geoffrey Brissaud	
Grand Prix de France	(France); Evgeniia Lopareva; Geoffrey Brissaud	(Italy); Charlène Guignard; Marco Fabbri	(United States); Emily Bratti; Ian Somerville	
(Japan) NHK Trophy	(United States); Madison Chock; Evan Bates	(United States); Christina Carreira; Anthony Ponomarenko	(Lithuania); Allison Reed; Saulius Ambrulevičius	
(Finland) Finlandia Trophy	(United Kingdom); Lilah Fear; Lewis Gibson	(Canada); Piper Gilles; Paul Poirier	(Finland); Juulia Turkkila; Matthias Versluis	
Cup of China	(Italy); Charlène Guignard; Marco Fabbri	(Canada); Marjorie Lajoie; Zachary Lagha	(United States); Christina Carreira; Anthony Ponomarenko	
(France) Grand Prix Final	(United States); Madison Chock; Evan Bates	(Italy); Charlène Guignard; Marco Fabbri	(United Kingdom); Lilah Fear; Lewis Gibson	

Junior Grand Prix
Competition	Gold	Silver	Bronze	Ref.
JGP Latvia	(Italy); Noemi Tali; Noah Lafornara	(United States); Caroline Mullen; Brendan Mullen	(Germany); Darya Grimm; Michail Savitskiy	
JGP Czech Republic	(France); Célina Fradji; Jean-Hans Fourneaux	(United States); Katarina Wolfkostin; Dimitry Tsarevski	(Canada); Layla Veillon; Alexander Brandys	
JGP Thailand	(Italy); Noemi Tali; Noah Lafornara	(United States); Hana Maria Aboian; Daniil Veselukhin	(United States); Elliana Peal; Ethan Peal	
JGP Turkey	(Germany); Darya Grimm; Michail Savitskiy	(Ukraine); Iryna Pidgaina; Artem Koval	(United States); Hana Maria Aboian; Daniil Veselukhin	
JGP Poland	(United States); Katarina Wolfkostin; Dimitry Tsarevski	(Canada); Sandrine Gauthier; Quentin Thieren	(France); Dania Mouaden; Théo Bigot	
JGP Slovenia	(Ukraine); Iryna Pidgaina; Artem Koval	(France); Célina Fradji; Jean-Hans Fourneaux	(United States); Caroline Mullen; Brendan Mullen	
JGP China	(United States); Elliana Peal; Ethan Peal	(France); Ambre Perrier Gianesini; Samuel Blanc Klaperman	(Canada); Chloe Nguyen; Brendan Giang	
(France) Junior Grand Prix Final	(Italy); Noemi Tali; Noah Lafornara	(United States); Katarina Wolfkostin; Dimitry Tsarevski	(Germany); Darya Grimm; Michail Savitskiy	

Challenger Series
Competition	Gold	Silver	Bronze	Ref.
(Italy) Lombardia Trophy	(Italy); Charlène Guignard; Marco Fabbri	(United States); Annabelle Morozov; Jeffrey Chen	(United States); Leah Neset; Artem Markelov	
(Germany) Nebelhorn Trophy	(United Kingdom); Lilah Fear; Lewis Gibson	(United States); Christina Carreira; Anthony Ponomarenko	(United States); Emilea Zingas; Vadym Kolesnik	
(Kazakhstan) Denis Ten Memorial Challenge	(Czech Republic); Natálie Taschlerová; Filip Taschler	(United States); Oona Brown; Gage Brown	(Canada); Alicia Fabbri; Paul Ayer	
(Hungary) Budapest Trophy	(United States); Christina Carreira; Anthony Ponomarenko	(United States); Emily Bratti; Ian Somerville	(Finland); Juulia Turkkila; Matthias Versluis	
(France) Trophée Métropole Nice Côte d'Azur	(Lithuania); Allison Reed; Saulius Ambrulevičius	(United States); Caroline Green; Michael Parsons	(United States); Eva Pate; Logan Bye	
(Slovakia) Nepela Memorial	(United Kingdom); Lilah Fear; Lewis Gibson	(Georgia (country)); Diana Davis; Gleb Smolkin	(Spain); Olivia Smart; Tim Dieck	
(Estonia) Tallinn Trophy	(France); Evgeniia Lopareva; Geoffrey Brissaud	(United States); Emily Bratti; Ian Somerville	(Czech Republic); Kateřina Mrázková; Daniel Mrázek	
(Poland) Warsaw Cup	(France); Evgeniia Lopareva; Geoffrey Brissaud	(United States); Emilea Zingas; Vadym Kolesnik	(South Korea); Hannah Lim; Ye Quan	
(Croatia) Golden Spin of Zagreb	(United Kingdom); Phebe Bekker; James Hernandez	(Georgia (country)); Diana Davis; Gleb Smolkin	(Germany); Jennifer Janse van Rensburg; Benjamin Steffan	

Other international competitions
Competition	Gold	Silver	Bronze	Ref.
(United States) Lake Placid Ice Dance International	(Canada); Marie-Jade Lauriault; Romain Le Gac	(United States); Oona Brown; Gage Brown	(United States); Eva Pate; Logan Bye	
(China) Shanghai Trophy	(Italy); Charlène Guignard; Marco Fabbri	(France); Evgeniia Lopareva; Geoffrey Brissaud	(China); Ren Junfei; Xing Jianing	
(United Kingdom) Blackburn Trophy (Note: Solo ice dance competition.)	(Italy); Aurora Colaone	(United Kingdom); Alana Pang	(United States); Sarah Fuller	
(Italy) Mezzaluna Cup	(Hungary); Mariia Ignateva; Danijil Szemko	(Italy); Giulia Paolino; Andrea Tuba	(Germany); Charise Matthaei; Max Liebers	
(Bulgaria) Denkova-Staviski Cup	(Slovakia); Mária Sofia Pucherová; Nikita Lysak	(Italy); Victoria Manni; Carlo Röthlisberger	(Ukraine); Zoe Larson; Andrii Kapran	
(Austria) Ice Challenge	(Australia); Holly Harris; Jason Chan	(United States); Amy Cui; Jonathan Rogers	(Italy); Leia Dozzi; Pietro Papetti	
(Czech Republic) Pavel Roman Memorial	(United Kingdom); Phebe Bekker; James Hernandez	(Spain); Sofía Val; Asaf Kazimov	(Switzerland); Gina Zehnder; Beda Leon Sieber	
(Germany) NRW Trophy	(Germany); Charise Matthaei; Max Liebers	(Israel); Elizabeth Tkachenko; Alexei Kiliakov	(Israel); Mariia Nosovitskaya; Mikhail Nosovitskiy	
(Turkey) Bosphorus Cup	(France); Marie Dupayage; Thomas Nabais	(Lithuania); Paulina Ramanauskaitė; Deividas Kizala	(Ukraine); Zoe Larson; Andrii Kapran	
(Hungary) Santa Claus Cup	(United States); Oona Brown; Gage Brown	(France); Natacha Lagouge; Arnaud Caffa	(Hungary); Mariia Ignateva; Danijil Szemko	
(Romania) EduSport Trophy	(Lithuania); Paulina Ramanauskaitė; Deividas Kizala	(Azerbaijan); Maxine Weatherby; Oleksandr Kolosovskyi	(Republic of Ireland); Carolane Soucisse; Shane Firus	
(Bulgaria) Sofia Trophy	(France); Loïcia Demougeot; Théo le Mercier	(Italy); Victoria Manni; Carlo Röthlisberger	(France); Marie Dupayage; Thomas Nabais	
(Italy) Winter World University Games	(Spain); Sofía Val; Asaf Kazimov	(France); Lou Terreaux; Noé Perron	(Italy); Giulia Paolino; Andrea Tuba	
(Turkey) Ephesus Cup	(Spain); Sofía Val; Asaf Kazimov	(Hungary); Mariia Ignateva; Danijil Szemko	(Turkey); Katarina DelCamp; Berk Akalın	
(Germany) Bavarian Open	(Germany); Jennifer Janse van Rensburg; Benjamin Steffan	(Sweden); Milla Ruud Reitan; Nikolaj Majorov	(Germany); Charise Matthaei; Max Liebers	
(Italy) Egna Dance Trophy	(Lithuania); Allison Reed; Saulius Ambrulevičius	(France); Marie Dupayage; Thomas Nabais	(Italy); Victoria Manni; Carlo Röthlisberger	
(China) Asian Winter Games	(Japan); Utana Yoshida; Masaya Morita	(China); Ren Junfei; Xing Jianing	(Japan); Azusa Tanaka; Shingo Nishiyama	
(Netherlands) International Challenge Cup	(France); Loïcia Demougeot; Théo le Mercier	(Finland); Yuka Orihara; Juho Pirinen	(France); Natacha Lagouge; Arnaud Caffa	
(Italy) Road to 26 Trophy	(Finland); Juulia Turkkila; Matthias Versluis	(United States); Caroline Green; Michael Parsons	(Germany); Jennifer Janse van Rensburg; Benjamin Steffan	
(Poland) Maria Olszewska Memorial	(Sweden); Milla Ruud Reitan; Nikolaj Majorov	(Poland); Sofiia Dovhal; Wiktor Kulesza	(Kazakhstan); Gaukhar Nauryzova; Boyisangur Datiev	

== Records and achievements ==
=== Records ===
Prior to the 2024–25 season, the ISU record scores were as follows:

Records prior to the 2024–25 season
Level	Segment	Discipline											
Level	Segment	Men's singles			Women's singles			Pairs			Ice dance		
Level	Segment	Skater	Score	Event	Skater	Score	Event	Team	Score	Event	Team	Score	Event
Senior	SP / RD	(United States); Nathan Chen	113.97	2022 Winter Olympics	(Russia); Kamila Valieva	87.52	2021 Rostelecom Cup	(China); Sui Wenjing; Han Cong	84.41	2022 Winter Olympics	(United States); Madison Chock; Evan Bates	93.91	2023 World Team Trophy
Senior	FS / FD	(United States); Ilia Malinin	227.79	2024 World Championships	(Russia); Kamila Valieva	185.29	2021 Rostelecom Cup	(Russia); Anastasia Mishina; Aleksandr Galliamov	157.46	2022 European Championships	(United States); Madison Chock; Evan Bates	138.41	2023 World Team Trophy
Senior	Combined total	(United States); Nathan Chen	335.30	2019–20 Grand Prix Final	(Russia); Kamila Valieva	272.71	2021 Rostelecom Cup	(China); Sui Wenjing; Han Cong	239.88	2022 Winter Olympics	(United States); Madison Chock; Evan Bates	232.32	2023 World Team Trophy
Junior	SP / RD	(United States); Ilia Malinin	88.99	2022 World Junior Championships	(Russia); Alena Kostornaia	76.32	2018–19 Junior Grand Prix Final	(Russia); Apollinariia Panfilova; Dmitry Rylov	73.71	2020 World Junior Championships	(United States); Leah Neset; Artem Markelov	72.48	2023–24 Junior Grand Prix Final
Junior	FS / FD	(United States); Ilia Malinin	187.12	2022 World Junior Championships	(Russia); Sofia Akateva	157.19	2021 JGP Russia	(Georgia (country)); Anastasiia Metelkina; Luka Berulava	131.63	2023–24 Junior Grand Prix Final	(United States); Avonley Nguyen; Vadym Kolesnik	108.91	2020 World Junior Championships
Junior	Combined total	(United States); Ilia Malinin	276.11	2022 World Junior Championships	(Russia); Sofia Akateva	233.08	2021 JGP Russia	(Georgia (country)); Anastasiia Metelkina; Luka Berulava	202.11	2023–24 Junior Grand Prix Final	(Czech Republic); Kateřina Mrázková; Daniel Mrázek	177.36	2023 World Junior Championships

The following new ISU best score was set during this season:

New record set during the 2024–25 season
Disc.	Segment	Skaters	Score	Event	Date	Ref.
Ice dance (Junior)	Free dance	(Italy); Noemi Maria Tali; Noah Lafornara	228.97	2025 World Junior Championships	February 27, 2025	

=== Achievements ===
- At the JGP Thailand, Yanhao Li won New Zealand's first ISU Junior Grand Prix gold medal in any discipline.

== Season's best scores ==
=== Men's singles ===
As of April 25, 2025.

Top 10 season's best scores in the men's combined total
No.	Skater	Nation	Score	Event
1	Ilia Malinin	United States	318.56	2025 World Championships
2	Yuma Kagiyama	Japan	300.09	2024 NHK Trophy
3	Mikhail Shaidorov	Kazakhstan	287.47	2025 World Championships
4	Shun Sato	Japan	285.88	2024 CS Lombardia Trophy
5	Kévin Aymoz	France	282.88	2024 Skate America
6	Kao Miura	Japan	278.67	2024 Skate America
7	Adam Siao Him Fa	France	275.48	2025 World Championships
8	Jason Brown	United States	273.15	2025 World Team Trophy
9	Lukas Britschgi	Switzerland	267.09	2025 European Championships
10	Daniel Grassl	Italy	267.08	2024 CS Nepela Memorial

Top 10 season's best scores in the men's short program
No.	Skater	Nation	Score	Event
1	Ilia Malinin	United States	110.41	2025 World Championships
2	Yuma Kagiyama	Japan	107.09	2025 World Championships
3	Kao Miura	Japan	102.96	2024 NHK Trophy
4	Shun Sato	Japan	98.75	2024 Cup of China
5	Adam Siao Him Fa	France	96.74	2024 CS Trophée Métropole Nice Côte d'Azur
6	Mikhail Shaidorov	Kazakhstan	95.50	2024 CS Denis Ten Memorial Challenge
7	Nika Egadze	Georgia	93.89	2024 Skate America
8	Jason Brown	United States	93.82	2025 World Team Trophy
9	Kévin Aymoz	France	93.63	2025 World Championships
10	Sōta Yamamoto	Japan	92.16	2024 Skate Canada International

Top 10 season's best scores in the men's free skating
No.	Skater	Nation	Score	Event
1	Ilia Malinin	United States	208.15	2025 World Championships
2	Yuma Kagiyama	Japan	194.39	2024 NHK Trophy
3	Mikhail Shaidorov	Kazakhstan	192.70	2025 World Championships
4	Kévin Aymoz	France	190.84	2024 Skate America
5	Adam Siao Him Fa	France	188.26	2025 World Championships
6	Shun Sato	Japan	187.49	2024 CS Lombardia Trophy
7	Cha Jun-hwan	South Korea	185.78	2025 Four Continents Championships
8	Lukas Britschgi	Switzerland	184.19	2025 European Championships
9	Sōta Yamamoto	Japan	183.72	2024 CS Nebelhorn Trophy
10	Daniel Grassl	Italy	181.84	2024 NHK Trophy

=== Women's singles ===
As of April 25, 2025.

Top 10 season's best scores in the women's combined total
No.	Skater	Nation	Score	Event
1	Kaori Sakamoto	Japan	231.88	2024 NHK Trophy
2	Mao Shimada	Japan	230.84	2025 World Junior Championships
3	Alysa Liu	United States	226.67	2025 World Team Trophy
4	Kim Chae-yeon	South Korea	222.38	2025 Four Continents Championships
5	Amber Glenn	United States	215.54	2024 Cup of China
6	Mone Chiba	Japan	215.24	2025 World Championships
7	Elyce Lin-Gracey	United States	213.33	2024 CS Nebelhorn Trophy
8	Anastasiia Gubanova	Georgia	211.19	2025 World Team Trophy
9	Isabeau Levito	United States	209.84	2025 World Championships
10	Niina Petrõkina	Estonia	208.18	2025 European Championships

Top 10 season's best scores in the women's short program
No.	Skater	Nation	Score	Event
1	Kaori Sakamoto	Japan	78.93	2024 NHK Trophy
2	Amber Glenn	United States	78.14	2024 Grand Prix de France
3	Alysa Liu	United States	75.70	2025 World Team Trophy
4	Mao Shimada	Japan	74.68	2025 World Junior Championships
5	Kim Chae-yeon	South Korea	74.02	2025 Four Continents Championships
6	Mone Chiba	Japan	73.44	2025 World Championships
7	Isabeau Levito	United States	73.33	2025 World Championships
8	Wakaba Higuchi	Japan	72.10	2025 World Championships
9	Elyce Lin-Gracey	United States	71.16	2024 CS Nebelhorn Trophy
10	Kaoruko Wada	Japan	70.58	2024 JGP Poland

Top 10 season's best scores in the women's free skating
No.	Skater	Nation	Score	Event
1	Mao Shimada	Japan	156.16	2025 World Junior Championships
2	Kaori Sakamoto	Japan	152.95	2024 NHK Trophy
3	Alysa Liu	United States	150.97	2025 World Team Trophy
4	Amber Glenn	United States	148.93	2025 World Team Trophy
5	Kim Chae-yeon	South Korea	148.36	2025 Four Continents Championships
6	Elyce Lin-Gracey	United States	142.17	2024 CS Nebelhorn Trophy
7	Mone Chiba	Japan	141.80	2025 World Championships
8	Anastasiia Gubanova	Georgia	141.39	2025 World Team Trophy
9	Rino Matsuike	Japan	139.85	2024 Skate Canada International
10	Niina Petrõkina	Estonia	139.24	2025 European Championships

=== Pairs ===
As of April 25, 2025.

Top 10 season's best scores in the pairs' combined total
No.	Team	Nation	Score	Event
1	Riku Miura; Ryuichi Kihara	Japan	226.05	2025 World Team Trophy
2	Minerva Fabienne Hase; Nikita Volodin	Germany	219.08	2025 World Championships
4	Sara Conti; Niccolò Macii	Italy	216.36	2025 World Team Trophy
3	Anastasia Metelkina; Luka Berulava	Georgia	213.63	2025 World Team Trophy
5	Deanna Stellato-Dudek; Maxime Deschamps	Canada	210.92	2025 Four Continents Championships
6	Ellie Kam; Daniel O'Shea	United States	201.73	2024 Skate America
7	Alisa Efimova; Misha Mitrofanov	United States	199.29	2025 World Championships
8	Lia Pereira; Trennt Michaud	Canada	198.40	2025 Four Continents Championships
9	Maria Pavlova; Alexei Sviatchenko	Hungary	196.67	2024 CS Lombardia Trophy
10	Rebecca Ghilardi; Filippo Ambrosini	Italy	192.47	2024 CS Lombardia Trophy

Top 10 season's best scores in the pairs' short program
No.	Team	Nation	Score	Event
1	Riku Miura; Ryuichi Kihara	Japan	80.99	2025 World Team Trophy
2	Minerva Fabienne Hase; Nikita Volodin	Germany	76.72	2024–25 Grand Prix Final
3	Deanna Stellato-Dudek; Maxime Deschamps	Canada	75.89	2024 Finlandia Trophy
4	Sara Conti; Niccolò Macii	Italy	74.67	2024 CS Lombardia Trophy
5	Ellie Kam; Daniel O'Shea	United States	73.16	2024 CS Nebelhorn Trophy
6	Anastasia Metelkina; Luka Berulava	Georgia	72.26	2024–25 Grand Prix Final
7	Lia Pereira; Trennt Michaud	Canada	69.79	2025 Four Continents Championships
8	Rebecca Ghilardi; Filippo Ambrosini	Italy	69.11	2024 CS Lombardia Trophy
9	Alisa Efimova; Misha Mitrofanov	United States	67.59	2025 Four Continents Championships
10	Maria Pavlova; Alexei Sviatchenko	Hungary	67.45	2025 World Championships

Top 10 season's best scores in the pairs' free skating
No.	Team	Nation	Score	Event
1	Minerva Fabienne Hase; Nikita Volodin	Germany	145.49	2025 World Championships
2	Riku Miura; Ryuichi Kihara	Japan	145.06	2025 World Team Trophy
3	Anastasia Metelkina; Luka Berulava	Georgia	142.77	2024 NHK Trophy
4	Sara Conti; Niccolò Macii	Italy	142.26	2025 World Team Trophy
5	Deanna Stellato-Dudek; Maxime Deschamps	Canada	141.26	2025 Four Continents Championships
6	Alisa Efimova; Misha Mitrofanov	United States	135.59	2025 World Championships
7	Ellie Kam; Daniel O'Shea	United States	131.07	2024 Skate America
8	Maria Pavlova; Alexei Sviatchenko	Hungary	129.78	2024 CS Lombardia Trophy
9	Lia Pereira; Trennt Michaud	Canada	128.61	2025 Four Continents Championships
10	Ekaterina Geynish; Dmitrii Chigirev	Uzbekistan	126.12	2024 Skate Canada International

=== Ice dance ===
As of April 25, 2025.

Top 10 season's best scores in the ice dance combined total
No.	Team	Nation	Score	Event
1	Madison Chock; Evan Bates	United States	224.76	2025 World Team Trophy
2	Piper Gilles; Paul Poirier	Canada	219.06	2025 World Team Trophy
3	Charlène Guignard; Marco Fabbri	Italy	215.63	2024 CS Lombardia Trophy
4	Lilah Fear; Lewis Gibson	Great Britain	210.65	2024 CS Nepela Memorial
5	Evgeniia Lopareva; Geoffrey Brissaud	France	206.76	2025 European Championships
6	Juulia Turkkila; Matthias Versluis	Finland	205.69	2025 European Championships
7	Marjorie Lajoie; Zachary Lagha	Canada	205.16	2024 Cup of China
8	Christina Carreira; Anthony Ponomarenko	United States	204.88	2025 World Championships
9	Diana Davis; Gleb Smolkin	Georgia	201.87	2024 CS Nepela Memorial
10	Olivia Smart; Tim Dieck	Spain	200.92	2025 World Championships

Top 10 season's best scores in the rhythm dance
No.	Team	Nation	Score	Event
1	Madison Chock; Evan Bates	United States	91.25	2025 World Team Trophy
2	Charlène Guignard; Marco Fabbri	Italy	87.45	2024 CS Lombardia Trophy
3	Piper Gilles; Paul Poirier	Canada	87.22	2025 Four Continents Championships
4	Lilah Fear; Lewis Gibson	Great Britain	85.10	2024 CS Nepela Memorial
5	Marjorie Lajoie; Zachary Lagha	Canada	82.86	2025 Four Continents Championships
6	Evgeniia Lopareva; Geoffrey Brissaud	France	82.75	2025 European Championships
7	Christina Carreira; Anthony Ponomarenko	United States	81.51	2025 World Championships
8	Juulia Turkkila; Matthias Versluis	Finland	81.26	2025 European Championships
9	Diana Davis; Gleb Smolkin	Georgia	80.32	2024 CS Nepela Memorial
10	Allison Reed; Saulius Ambrulevicius	Lithuania	78.67	2025 European Championships

Top 10 season's best scores in the free dance
No.	Team	Nation	Score	Event
1	Madison Chock; Evan Bates	United States	133.51	2025 World Team Trophy
2	Piper Gilles; Paul Poirier	Canada	131.91	2025 World Team Trophy
3	Charlène Guignard; Marco Fabbri	Italy	128.18	2024 CS Lombardia Trophy
4	Lilah Fear; Lewis Gibson	Great Britain	125.55	2024 CS Nepela Memorial
5	Juulia Turkkila; Matthias Versluis	Finland	124.43	2025 European Championships
6	Evgeniia Lopareva; Geoffrey Brissaud	France	124.01	2025 European Championships
7	Olivia Smart; Tim Dieck	Spain	123.71	2025 World Championships
8	Marjorie Lajoie; Zachary Lagha	Canada	123.63	2024 Cup of China
9	Christina Carreira; Anthony Ponomarenko	United States	123.37	2025 World Championships
10	Diana Davis; Gleb Smolkin	Georgia	121.55	2024 CS Nepela Memorial

=== Highest element scores ===
GOE = Grade of Execution
BV = Base value

Note: An 'x' after the base value means that the base value has been multiplied by 1.1 because the jump was executed in the second half of the program.

==== Men ====
===== Highest valued single jumps =====
Rank	Skater	Element	BV	GOE	Score	Event	Ref
1	(Japan) Shun Sato	4Lz	11.50	4.60	16.10	2024 Lombardia Trophy	Details
2	(United States) Ilia Malinin	4F	11.00	4.62	15.62	2024 Lombardia Trophy	Details
3	(United States) Ilia Malinin	4Lz	11.50	3.78	15.28	2024 Skate Canada	Details
3	(Italy) Nikolaj Memola	4Lz	11.50	3.78	15.28	2025 Europeans	Details
3	(United States) Ilia Malinin	4Lz	11.50	3.78	15.28	2025 Worlds	Details
6	(United States) Ilia Malinin	4F	11.00	4.24	15.24	2024 Skate America	Details
6	(United States) Ilia Malinin	4F	11.00	4.24	15.24	2025 Worlds	Details
6	(United States) Ilia Malinin	4F	11.00	4.24	15.24	2025 Worlds	Details
9	(Kazakhstan) Mikhail Shaidorov	4Lz	11.50	3.45	14.95	2025 Four Continents	Details
10	(Japan) Shun Sato	4Lz	11.50	3.29	14.79	2024 Cup of China	Details
10	(Kazakhstan) Mikhail Shaidorov	4Lz	11.50	3.29	14.79	2024 Cup of China	Details

===== Highest valued combos/sequences =====
Rank	Skater	Element	BV	GOE	Score	Event	Ref
1	(Kazakhstan) Mikhail Shaidorov	3A+1Eu+4S	18.20	3.33	21.53	2025 Worlds	Details
2	(United States) Ilia Malinin	4Lz+3T	17.27 x	3.94	21.21	2025 World Team Trophy	Details
3	(Kazakhstan) Mikhail Shaidorov	3A+1Eu+4S	18.20	2.91	21.11	2025 Four Continents	Details
4	(United States) Ilia Malinin	4Lz+3T	17.27 x	3.78	21.05	2025 Worlds	Details
5	(United States) Ilia Malinin	4Lz+3T	17.27 x	3.68	20.95	2024 Lombardia Trophy	Details
6	(United States) Ilia Malinin	4Lz+3T	17.27 x	3.45	20.72	2024 Skate Canada	Details
7	(United States) Ilia Malinin	4Lz+3T	17.27 x	3.29	20.56	2024 Skate America	Details
8	(Kazakhstan) Mikhail Shaidorov	4Lz+3T	15.70	3.45	19.15	2025 Four Continents	Details
9	(United States) Ilia Malinin	4S+3A+SEQ	19.47 x	-0.42	19.05	2025 Worlds	Details
10	(Germany) Genrikh Gartung	4Lz+3T	15.70	3.29	18.99	2024 JGP Slovenia	Details
10	(Kazakhstan) Mikhail Shaidorov	3A+4T	17.50	1.49	18.99	2024 Cup of China	Details

==== Women ====
===== Highest valued single jumps =====
Rank	Skater	Element	BV	GOE	Score	Event	Ref
1	(Japan) Mao Shimada	4T	9.50	1.90	11.40	2025 Junior Worlds	Details
2	(Japan) Hana Yoshida	3A	8.00	2.24	10.24	2024 Nebelhorn Trophy	Details
3	(Japan) Mao Shimada	3A	8.00	2.17	10.17	2025 Junior Worlds	Details
4	(United States) Amber Glenn	3A	8.00	1.92	9.92	2024 Lombardia Trophy	Details
5	(United States) Sophie Joline von Felten	3A	8.00	1.83	9.83	2024 JGP Slovenia	Details
5	(United States) Amber Glenn	3A	8.00	1.83	9.83	2024 Grand Prix de France	Details
5	(United States) Amber Glenn	3A	8.00	1.83	9.83	2024–25 Grand Prix Final	Details
8	(United States) Amber Glenn	3A	8.00	1.71	9.71	2025 World Team Trophy	Details
9	(Japan) Mao Shimada	3A	8.00	1.60	9.60	2024 JGP Poland	Details
10	(United States) Amber Glenn	3A	8.00	1.37	9.37	2024 Cup of China	Details

===== Highest valued sequences =====
Rank	Skater	Element	BV	GOE	Score	Event	Ref
1	(China) Wang Yihan	3Lz+2A+2A+SEQ	13.75 x	1.52	15.27	2024 JGP Thailand	Details
2	(Estonia) Elina Goidina	3Lz+2A+2A+SEQ	13.75 x	1.26	15.01	2024 JGP Slovenia	Details
2	(China) Wang Yihan	3Lz+2A+2A+SEQ	13.75 x	1.26	15.01	2024–25 JGP Final	Details
2	(Australia) Hana Bath	3Lz+2A+2A+SEQ	13.75 x	1.26	15.01	2025 Junior Worlds	Details
2	(Estonia) Elina Goidina	3Lz+2A+2A+SEQ	13.75 x	1.26	15.01	2025 Junior Worlds	Details
6	(China) Wang Yihan	3Lz+2A+2A+SEQ	13.75 x	1.18	14.93	2024 JGP China	Details
7	(Australia) Hana Bath	3Lz+2A+2A+SEQ	13.75 x	0.93	14.68	2024 JGP China	Details
8	(South Korea) Kim Yu-jae	3Lz+2A+2A+SEQ	13.75 x	0.84	14.59	2024 JGP Czech Republic	Details
8	(China) Wang Yihan	3Lz+2A+2A+SEQ	13.75 x	0.84	14.59	2025 Junior Worlds	Details
10	(Japan) Mao Shimada	3F+2A+2A+SEQ	13.09 x	1.44	14.53	2024–25 JGP Final	Details

==== Pairs ====
===== Highest valued twists =====
Rank	Skaters	Element	BV	GOE	Score	Event	Ref
1	(United States) Ellie Kam / Daniel O'Shea	3Tw4	6.00	2.16	8.16	2024 Nebelhorn Trophy	Details
2	(Canada) D. Stellato-Dudek / M. Deschamps	3Tw4	6.00	2.14	8.14	2024 Skate Canada	Details
2	(Germany) Minerva Fabienne Hase / Nikita Volodin	3Tw3	5.70	2.44	8.14	2024–25 Grand Prix Final	Details
4	(Canada) D. Stellato-Dudek / M. Deschamps	3Tw4	6.00	2.06	8.06	2024 Skate Canada	Details
4	(Germany) Minerva Fabienne Hase / Nikita Volodin	3Tw3	5.70	2.36	8.06	2025 Europeans	Details
4	(Canada) D. Stellato-Dudek / M. Deschamps	3Tw4	6.00	2.06	8.06	2025 Four Continents	Details
4	(Georgia (country)) Anastasia Metelkina / Luka Berulava	3Tw4	6.00	2.06	8.06	2025 Worlds	Details
4	(Georgia (country)) Anastasia Metelkina / Luka Berulava	3Tw4	6.00	2.06	8.06	2025 World Team Trophy	Details
9	(Canada) D. Stellato-Dudek / M. Deschamps	3Tw4	6.00	2.04	8.04	2024 Nebelhorn Trophy	Details
10	(Germany) Minerva Fabienne Hase / Nikita Volodin	3Tw3	5.70	2.28	7.98	2025 Worlds	Details

===== Highest valued throw jumps =====
Rank	Skaters	Element	BV	GOE	Score	Event	Ref
1	(Georgia (country)) Anastasia Metelkina / Luka Berulava	3FTh	5.30	1.89	7.19	2024 NHK Trophy	Details
2	(Japan) Riku Miura / Ryuichi Kihara	3LzTh	5.30	1.82	7.12	2024 Skate America	Details
2	(Japan) Riku Miura / Ryuichi Kihara	3LzTh	5.30	1.82	7.12	2025 World Team Trophy	Details
4	(Georgia (country)) Anastasia Metelkina / Luka Berulava	3FTh	5.30	1.74	7.04	2025 Worlds	Details
5	(Germany) Minerva Fabienne Hase / Nikita Volodin	3LoTh	5.00	1.90	6.90	2024 Nebelhorn Trophy	Details
6	(China) Zhang Jiaxuan / Huang Yihang	3FTh	5.30	1.59	6.89	2024 JGP Poland	Details
6	(Georgia (country)) Anastasia Metelkina / Luka Berulava	3LzTh	5.30	1.59	6.89	2024 Warsaw Cup	Details
6	(Georgia (country)) Anastasia Metelkina / Luka Berulava	3LzTh	5.30	1.59	6.89	2024–25 Grand Prix Final	Details
6	(Japan) Riku Miura / Ryuichi Kihara	3FTh	5.30	1.59	6.89	2025 Worlds	Details
6	(Georgia (country)) Anastasia Metelkina / Luka Berulava	3FTh	5.30	1.59	6.89	2025 World Team Trophy	Details
6	(Georgia (country)) Anastasia Metelkina / Luka Berulava	3FTh	5.30	1.59	6.89	2025 World Team Trophy	Details

===== Highest valued lifts =====
Rank	Skaters	Element	BV	GOE	Score	Event	Ref
1	(Japan) Riku Miura / Ryuichi Kihara	5ALi4	7.00	2.80	9.80	2025 Worlds	Details
1	(Japan) Riku Miura / Ryuichi Kihara	5RLi4	7.00	2.80	9.80	2025 Worlds	Details
3	(Japan) Riku Miura / Ryuichi Kihara	5ALi4	7.00	2.70	9.70	2024–25 Grand Prix Final	Details
3	(Japan) Riku Miura / Ryuichi Kihara	5ALi4	7.00	2.70	9.70	2025 World Team Trophy	Details
5	(Germany) Minerva Fabienne Hase / Nikita Volodin	5ALi4	7.00	2.60	9.60	2024–25 Grand Prix Final	Details
5	(Japan) Yuna Nagaoka / Sumitada Moriguchi	5ALi4	7.00	2.60	9.60	2025 Four Continents	Details
5	(Canada) D. Stellato-Dudek / M. Deschamps	5ALi4	7.00	2.60	9.60	2025 Four Continents	Details
8	(Japan) Riku Miura / Ryuichi Kihara	5RLi4	7.00	2.50	9.50	2024 NHK Trophy	Details
8	(Japan) Riku Miura / Ryuichi Kihara	5RLi4	7.00	2.50	9.50	2025 Four Continents	Details
8	(Canada) D. Stellato-Dudek / M. Deschamps	5ALi4	7.00	2.50	9.50	2025 Worlds	Details

===== Highest valued jump sequences =====
Rank	Skaters	Element	BV	GOE	Score	Event	Ref
1	(Japan) Sae Shimizu / Lucas T. Honda	3Lz+2A+2A+SEQ	12.50	0.67	13.17	2024 JGP Turkey	Details
2	(Japan) Yuna Nagaoka / Sumitada Moriguchi	3Lo+2A+2A+SEQ	11.50	0.84	12.34	2024 Finlandia Trophy	Details
3	(Austria) Gabriella Izzo / Luc Maierhofer	3F+2A+2A+SEQ	11.90	0.42	12.32	2024 Warsaw Cup	Details
4	(Georgia (country)) A. Metelkina / L. Berulava	3S+2A+2A+SEQ	10.90	1.04	11.94	2025 World Team Trophy	Details
5	(Germany) Minerva F. Hase / Nikita Volodin	3T+2A+2A+SEQ	10.80	1.01	11.81	2024 Nebelhorn Trophy	Details
6	(Hungary) M. Pavlova / A. Sviatchenko	3T+2A+2A+SEQ	10.80	0.96	11.76	2025 Europeans	Details
7	(Hungary) M. Pavlova / A. Sviatchenko	3T+2A+2A+SEQ	10.80	0.84	11.64	2024 Finlandia Trophy	Details
8	(Germany) Minerva F. Hase / Nikita Volodin	3T+2A+2A+SEQ	10.80	0.72	11.52	2025 Worlds	Details
8	(Italy) Sara Conti / Niccolò Macii	3T+2A+2A+SEQ	10.80	0.72	11.52	2025 World Team Trophy	Details
10	(Austria) Gabriella Izzo / Luc Maierhofer	3F+2A+2A+SEQ	11.90	-0.42	11.48	2024 Golden Spin of Zagreb	Details

==== Ice dance ====
===== Highest valued sets of sequential twizzles =====
Rhythm dance only

Rank	Skaters	Element	BV	GOE	Score	Event	Ref
1	(United States) C. Carreira / A. Ponomarenko	SqTwW4 +SqTwM4	7.34	2.86	10.20	2025 Worlds	Details
1	(United States) Madison Chock / Evan Bates	SqTwW4 +SqTwM4	7.34	2.86	10.20	2025 Worlds	Details
3	(Canada) Marjorie Lajoie / Zachary Lagha	SqTwW4 +SqTwM4	7.34	2.80	10.14	2024 Skate Canada	Details
4	(United States) Madison Chock / Evan Bates	SqTwW4 +SqTwM4	7.34	2.74	10.08	2024 Skate America	Details
4	(United States) Madison Chock / Evan Bates	SqTwW4 +SqTwM4	7.34	2.74	10.08	2024–25 GP Final	Details
6	(United Kingdom) Lilah Fear / Lewis Gibson	SqTwW4 +SqTwM4	7.34	2.72	10.06	2024 Nebelhorn Trophy	Details
7	(United States) Madison Chock / Evan Bates	SqTwW4 +SqTwM4	7.34	2.63	9.97	2024 NHK Trophy	Details
7	(United Kingdom) Lilah Fear / Lewis Gibson	SqTwW4 +SqTwM4	7.34	2.63	9.97	2024 Finlandia Trophy	Details
7	(Italy) Charlène Guignard / Marco Fabbri	SqTwW4 +SqTwM4	7.34	2.63	9.97	2024 Cup of China	Details
7	(France) Evgenia Lopareva / Geoffrey Brissaud	SqTwW4 +SqTwM4	7.34	2.63	9.97	2025 Europeans	Details
7	(Canada) Marjorie Lajoie / Zachary Lagha	SqTwW4 +SqTwM4	7.34	2.63	9.97	2025 Four Continents	Details
7	(United Kingdom) Lilah Fear / Lewis Gibson	SqTwW4 +SqTwM4	7.34	2.63	9.97	2025 Worlds	Details
7	(Canada) Piper Gilles / Paul Poirier	SqTwW4 +SqTwM4	7.34	2.63	9.97	2025 World Team Trophy	Details

===== Highest valued sets of Synchronized twizzles =====
Free dance only

Rank	Skaters	Element	BV	GOE	Score	Event	Ref
1	(United States) Madison Chock / Evan Bates	SyTwW4 +SyTwM4	6.84	3.11	9.95	2025 World Team Trophy	Details
2	(United States) Madison Chock / Evan Bates	SyTwW4 +SyTwM4	6.84	2.90	9.74	2024–25 GP Final	Details
2	(United States) Madison Chock / Evan Bates	SyTwW4 +SyTwM4	6.84	2.90	9.74	2025 Worlds	Details
4	(Canada) Marjorie Lajoie / Zachary Lagha	SyTwW4 +SyTwM4	6.84	2.80	9.64	2024 Cup of China	Details
4	(United States) Madison Chock / Evan Bates	SyTwW4 +SyTwM4	6.84	2.80	9.64	2025 Four Continents	Details
4	(Canada) Piper Gilles / Paul Poirier	SyTwW4 +SyTwM4	6.84	2.80	9.64	2025 Four Continents	Details
7	(Canada) Marjorie Lajoie / Zachary Lagha	SyTwW4 +SyTwM4	6.84	2.78	9.62	2024 Skate Canada	Details
8	(Italy) Charlène Guignard / Marco Fabbri	SyTwW4 +SyTwM4	6.84	2.76	9.60	2024 Lombardia Trophy	Details
9	(Italy) Noemi Maria Tali / Noah Lafornara	SyTwW4 +SyTwM4	6.84	2.69	9.53	2025 Junior Worlds	Details
9	(United States) C. Carreira / A. Ponomarenko	SyTwW4 +SyTwM4	6.84	2.69	9.53	2025 Worlds	Details
9	(Canada) Piper Gilles / Paul Poirier	SyTwW4 +SyTwM4	6.84	2.69	9.53	2025 Worlds	Details

===== Highest valued combination lifts =====
CuLi: Curve Lift; RoLi: Rotational Lift; SlLi: Straight Line Lift; StaLi: Stationary Lift

Rank	Skaters	Element	BV	GOE	Score	Event	Ref
1	(Canada) Piper Gilles / Paul Poirier	RoLi4+RoLi4	10.90	4.53	15.43	2025 Worlds	Details
1	(Canada) Piper Gilles / Paul Poirier	RoLi4+RoLi4	10.90	4.53	15.43	2025 World Team Trophy	Details
3	(Italy) Charlène Guignard / Marco Fabbri	SlLi4+RoLi4	10.90	4.25	15.15	2025 Europeans	Details
3	(Canada) Piper Gilles / Paul Poirier	RoLi4+RoLi4	10.90	4.25	15.15	2025 Four Continents	Details
5	(Finland) Juulia Turkkila / Matthias Versluis	RoLi4+StaLi4	10.90	4.11	15.01	2025 Europeans	Details
6	(Italy) Charlène Guignard / Marco Fabbri	SlLi4+RoLi4	10.90	4.03	14.93	2024 Lombardia Trophy	Details
6	(Georgia (country)) Diana Davis / Gleb Smolkin	StaLi4+RoLi4	10.90	4.03	14.93	2024 Nepela Memorial	Details
8	(Canada) Piper Gilles / Paul Poirier	RoLi4+RoLi4	10.90	3.98	14.88	2024 Finlandia Trophy	Details
8	(Italy) Charlène Guignard / Marco Fabbri	SlLi4+RoLi4	10.90	3.98	14.88	2024–25 GP Final	Details
10	(United Kingdom) Lilah Fear / Lewis Gibson	SlLi4+RoLi4	10.90	3.84	14.74	2024 Nebelhorn Trophy	Details
10	(Canada) Piper Gilles / Paul Poirier	RoLi4+RoLi4	10.90	3.84	14.74	2024 Skate Canada	Details
10	(Spain) Olivia Smart / Tim Dieck	StaLi4+RoLi4	10.90	3.84	14.74	2024 Cup of China	Details

== World standings ==
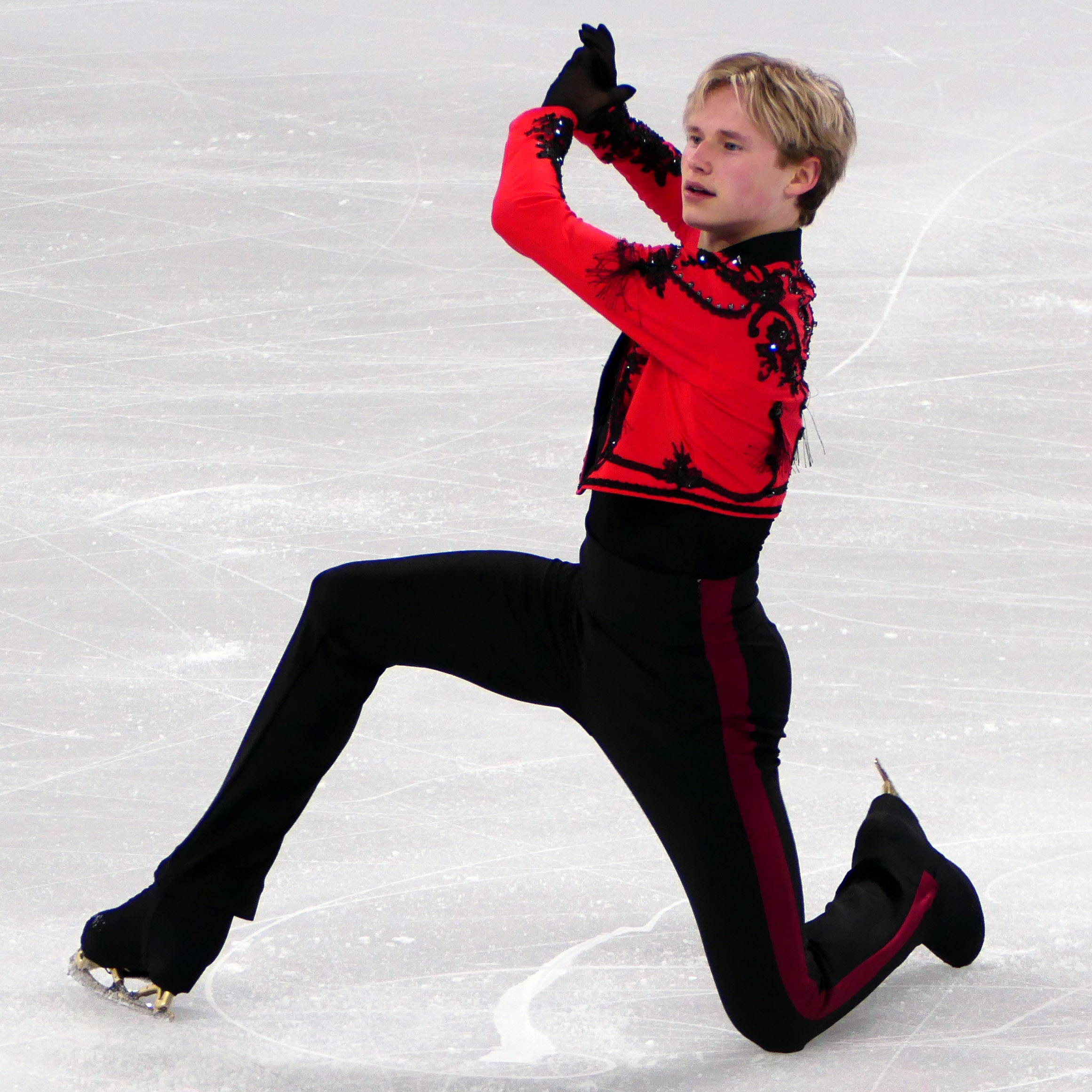
Ilia Malinin of the United States was the highest ranked men's singles skater at the beginning of the 2024–25 season.

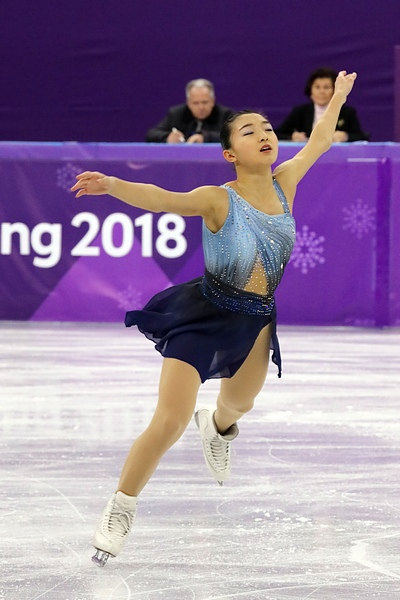
Kaori Sakamoto of Japan was the highest ranked women's singles skater at the beginning of the 2024–25 season.

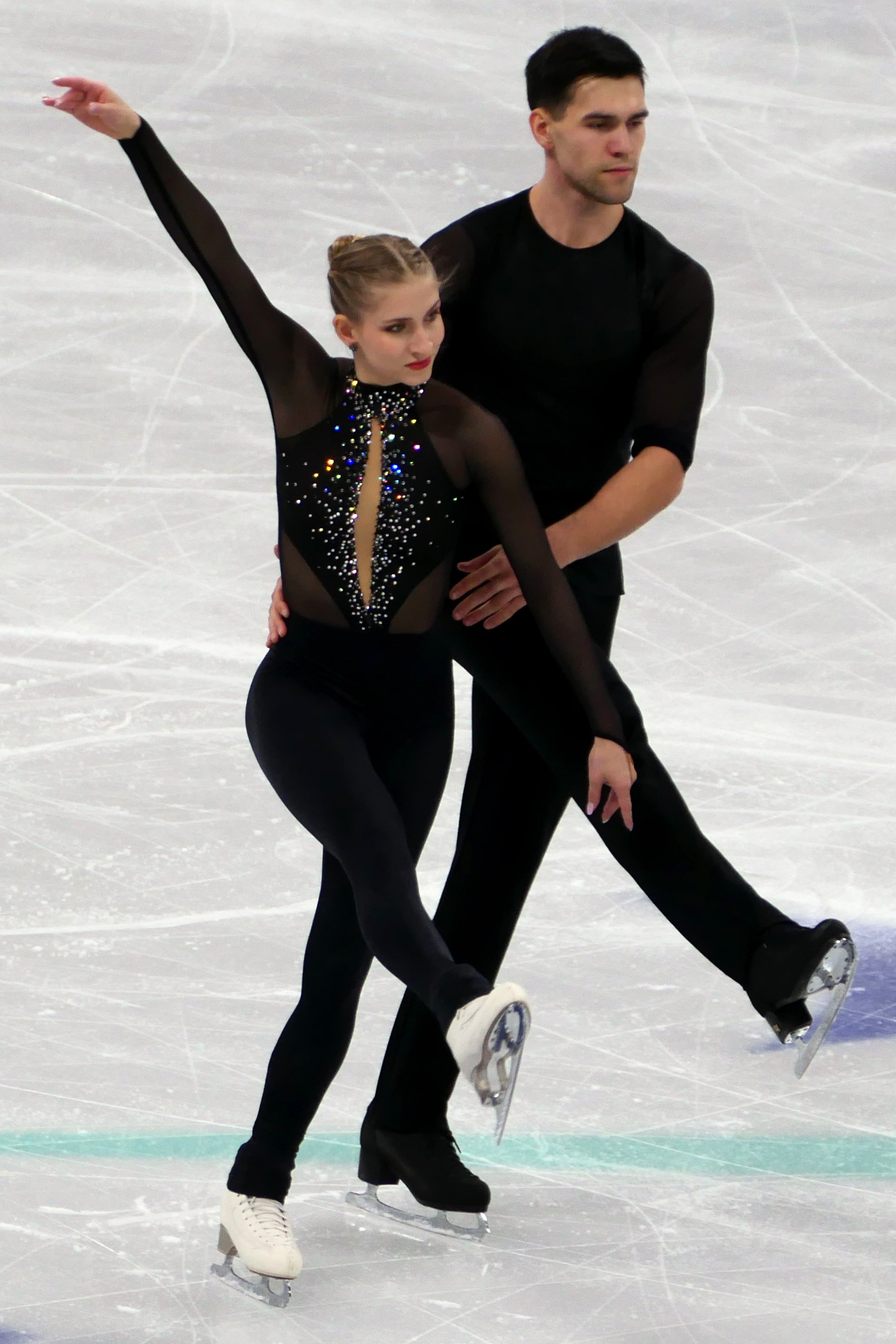
Minerva Fabienne Hase and Nikita Volodin of Germany are the highest ranked pair skaters of the 2024–25 season.

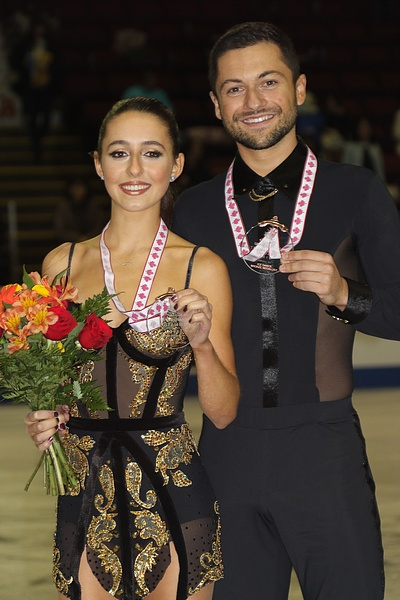
Lilah Fear and Lewis Gibson of Great Britain are currently the highest ranked ice dancers of the 2024–25 season.

=== Men's singles ===
As of April 26, 2025.

No.	Skater	Nation
1	Ilia Malinin	United States
2	Yuma Kagiyama	Japan
3	Adam Siao Him Fa	France
4	Mikhail Shaidorov	Kazakhstan
5	Shun Sato	Japan
6	Lukas Britschgi	Switzerland
7	Nika Egadze	Georgia
8	Kao Miura	Japan
9	Kévin Aymoz	France
10	Matteo Rizzo	Italy

=== Women's singles ===
As of May 7, 2025.

No.	Skater	Nation
1	Kaori Sakamoto	Japan
2	Isabeau Levito	United States
3	Kim Chae-yeon	South Korea
4	Amber Glenn	United States
5	Mone Chiba	Japan
6	Nina Pinzarrone	Belgium
7	Anastasiia Gubanova	Georgia
8	Hana Yoshida	Japan
9	Niina Petrõkina	Estonia
10	Kimmy Repond	Switzerland
10	Alysa Liu	United States

=== Pairs ===
As of April 26, 2025.

No.	Team	Nation
1	Minerva Fabienne Hase; Nikita Volodin	Germany
2	Sara Conti; Niccolò Macii	Italy
3	Deanna Stellato-Dudek; Maxime Deschamps	Canada
4	Anastasiia Metelkina; Luka Berulava	Georgia
5	Riku Miura; Ryuichi Kihara	Japan
6	Rebecca Ghilardi; Filippo Ambrosini	Italy
7	Maria Pavlova; Alexei Sviatchenko	Hungary
8	Ellie Kam; Daniel O'Shea	United States
9	Lia Pereira; Trennt Michaud	Canada
10	Annika Hocke; Robert Kunkel	Germany

=== Ice dance ===
As of April 26, 2025.

No.	Team	Nation
1	Lilah Fear; Lewis Gibson	Great Britain
2	Madison Chock; Evan Bates	United States
3	Charlène Guignard; Marco Fabbri	Italy
4	Evgenia Lopareva; Geoffrey Brissaud	France
5	Piper Gilles; Paul Poirier	Canada
6	Christina Carreira; Anthony Ponomarenko	United States
7	Allison Reed; Saulius Ambrulevičius	Lithuania
8	Marjorie Lajoie; Zachary Lagha	Canada
9	Juulia Turkkila; Matthias Versluis	Finland
10	Emilea Zingas; Vadym Kolesnik	United States
