= Milania Väänänen =

Finnish pair skater

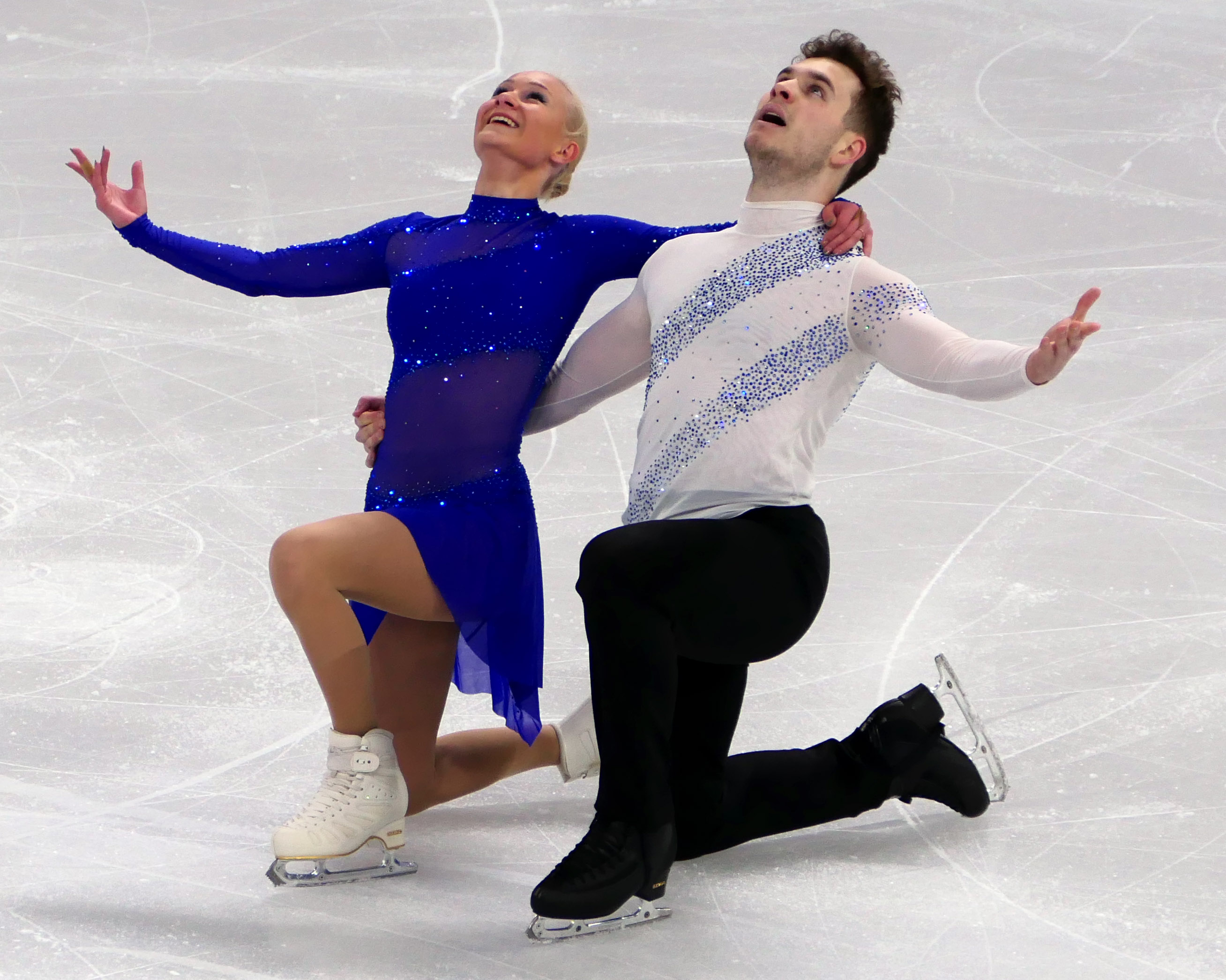
- Milania Väänänen and Filippo Clerici at the 2024 World Championships

Personal information
- Full name: Milania Kristiina Väänänen
- Born: 29 November 2003 (age 22) Lahti, Finland
- Height: 1.60 m (5 ft 3 in)

Figure skating career
- Country: Italy (since 2026) Finland (until 2025)
- Discipline: Pair skating (since 2021); Women's singles (2017–19)
- Partner: Filippo Ambrosini (2026); Filippo Clerici (2022–25); Mikhail Akulov (2021–22)
- Coach: Barbara Luoni
- Skating club: Porvoon Skating Club
- Began skating: 2009

Medal record
Finnish Championships
Gold medal – first place	2022 Pori	Pairs
Gold medal – first place	2023 Joensuu	Pairs
Gold medal – first place	2024 Helsinki	Pairs
Gold medal – first place	2025 Rauma	Pairs

Milania Kristiina Väänänen (born 29 November 2003) is a Finnish pair skater. With her former skating partner, Filippo Clerici, she is the 2023 CS Golden Spin gold medalist, 2023 Tayside Trophy bronze medalist, and three-time Finnish national champions (2023–25).

As a single skater, Väänänen is the 2019 Finnish junior national silver medalist.

== Personal life ==
Väänänen was born on 29 November 2003 in Lahti, Finland. Her mother is half-Russian/half-Ukrainian.

== Career ==
=== Early years ===
Väänänen began learning how to skate in 2009. She competed internationally for Finland as a junior single skater for two seasons, including an appearance on the ISU Junior Grand Prix circuit in 2018 where she finished 15th.

Väänänen decided to make the transition to pair skating at the end of 2018, not long after winning the silver medal at the 2019 Finnish Junior Championships. She relocated to Russia to pursue the discipline, with a partnership with Australian skater Hektor Giotopoulos Moore in mind. Unfortunately, the pairing with Giotopoulos Moore did not work out, and after incurring a new injury, Väänänen returned home to Finland to pursue school and coaching. For a time, the skater trained on her own, but in early 2021, Väänänen again returned to Russia to try out a partnership, this time with another Australian, Harley Windsor. Väänänen and Windsor trained together for a brief time, but the partnership ultimately failed. Väänänen later said of her time skating with Windsor, "...Our starting points were too different. Harley was already pretty good at the sport, he even went to the Olympics, but I can't say I'm a competent pair skater yet."

Following her tryout with Windsor, Väänänen was connected with Mikhail Akulov, a then semi-retired pair skater 11 years her senior, through a skating coach and friend of Akulov's. The two quickly scheduled a tryout together and officially formed their skating partnership in mid-June 2021. The team initially began training in Armavir, but later relocated to Perm to train under Pavel Sliusarenko and his staff.

=== Partnership with Akulov ===
==== 2021–22 season ====
Väänänen/Akulov made their debut for Finland with a home start at the 2021 CS Finlandia Trophy where they finished 14th. Akulov was sidelined from training in November when he contracted COVID-19, but the team was able to return to the ice in time to compete at the 2021 CS Golden Spin of Zagreb, where they placed 16th. A couple weeks later, in late December, Väänänen/Akulov competed at their first Finnish Figure Skating Championships, winning the senior pairs title by default as the lone entrant. Due to their placement at nationals, Väänänen/Akulov were named to the Finnish pairs berth at the 2022 European Championships.

The debutante Finns entered Europeans with the goal of placing within the top 16 teams after the short program, ensuring their advancement to the free skating portion of the event. This was not to be, as costly mistakes on both their side-by-side triple toeloops and their throw triple salchow left them in 20th place after the short. Nevertheless, Väänänen expressed her excitement at having the opportunity to compete at the event, stating, "It was absolutely amazing to skate and have this experience."

Väänänen/Akulov ended their partnership in March 2022 after Russian athletes were banned from international competition by the International Skating Union due to the 2022 Russian invasion of Ukraine. As Akulov was a Russian citizen, the team were no longer eligible to compete, despite skating under the Finnish flag. In addition, due to the war, Väänänen no longer wished to live and train in Russia. The end of the partnership prompted Väänänen to consider ending her own competitive career in favor of moving on to show skating. However, Finnish-based Italian skating coach Maurizio Margaglio was able to get in touch with colleague and compatriot Franca Bianconi on Väänänen's behalf, and the newly partner-less skater was offered a tryout with Filippo Clerici. In June 2022, Väänänen traveled to Bergamo, Italy where she and Clerici trained together for five days before deciding to team up for the coming season with Luca Demattè, Ondrej Hotarek, and Rosanna Murante becoming their coaches.

=== Partnership with Clerici ===
==== 2022–23 season ====
The newly formed team of Väänänen/Clerici competed just once during the 2022–23 season, winning the 2023 Finnish national title in December 2022. They were ineligible to compete at the spring championship events as they had not attained their technical minimums through international competition in the fall.

==== 2023–24 season: International debut of Väänänen/Clerici ====
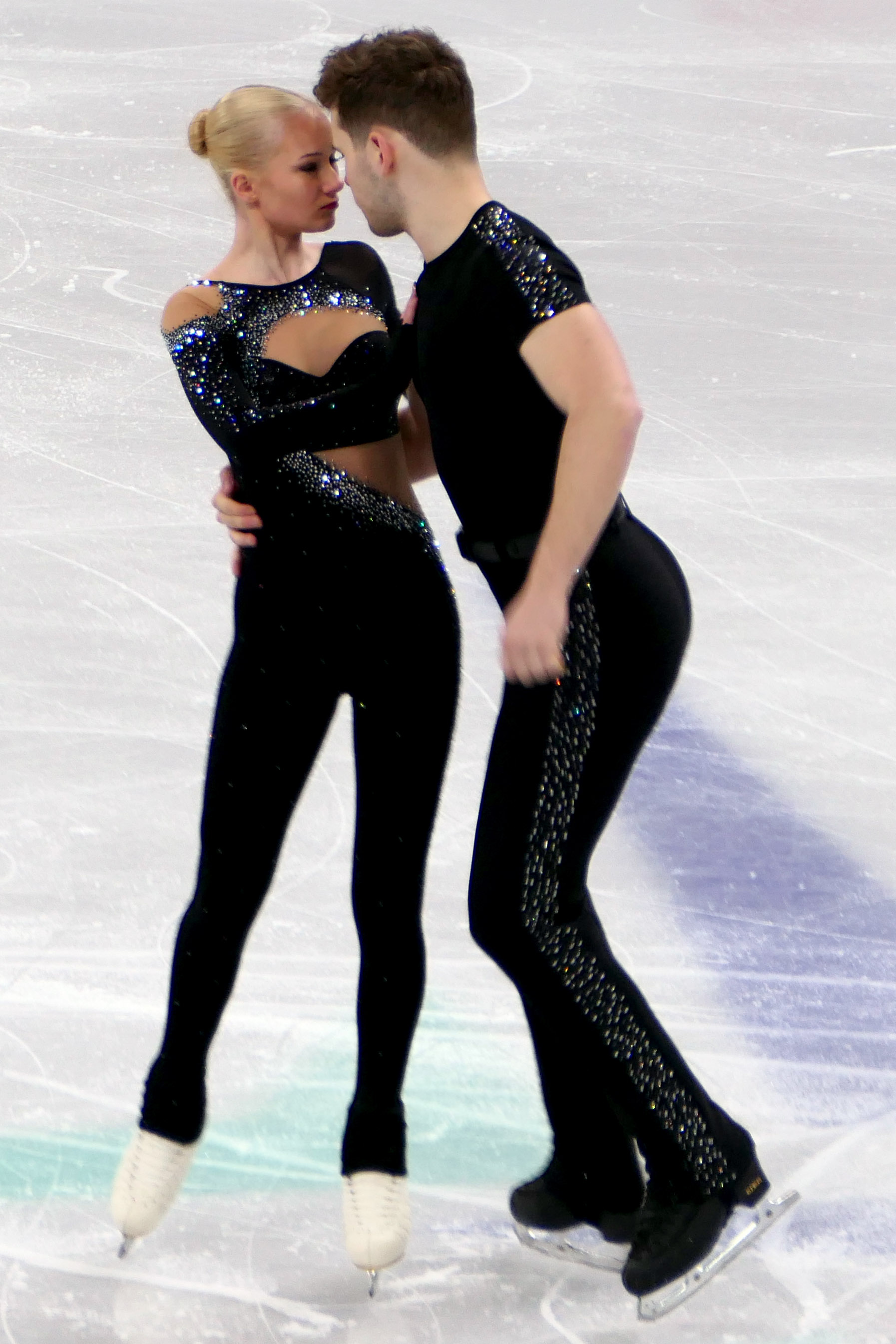
Väänänen/Clerici performing their short program at the 2024 World Championships

Väänänen/Clerici began their season with the goal of attaining their ISU technical minimum scores to be eligible to compete at the 2024 European Championships and the 2024 World Championships. The team made short work of their ambition, attaining their minimums during their international debut at the 2023 CS Lombardia Trophy where they finished seventh. Following the event, Clerici commented, "We are really happy to have reached the technical point limits for the European Championship and the World Championship...Next we will focus on the levels and the quality of the elements in order to increase our points."

At their next event, the 2023 CS Finlandia Trophy, Väänänen/Clerici were warmly received by a home audience. There, they placed sixth in the short program, and rose to fourth in the free skate with a new personal best score to finish just off the podium in fourth overall. The following week, the team competed at the 2023 Tayside Trophy where they won their first international medal, a bronze behind the Italian champions Sara Conti / Niccolò Macii and British home team Anastasia Vaipan-Law / Luke Digby.

Selected to compete at the 2023 Grand Prix of Espoo, Väänänen/Clerici finished eighth. The pair then went on to win gold at both 2023 CS Golden Spin of Zagreb and the 2023–24 Finnish Championships.

At the 2024 European Championships in Kaunas, Lithuania, the pair finished in fourteenth place. They went on to compete at the 2024 World Championships in Montreal, Quebec, Canada, the pair place nineteenth in the short program and seventeenth in the free skate, finishing eighteenth overall. Väänänen/Clerici became the first Finnish pair team to qualify for the free skate at a World Championships.

==== 2024–25 season: End of Väänänen/Clerici ====
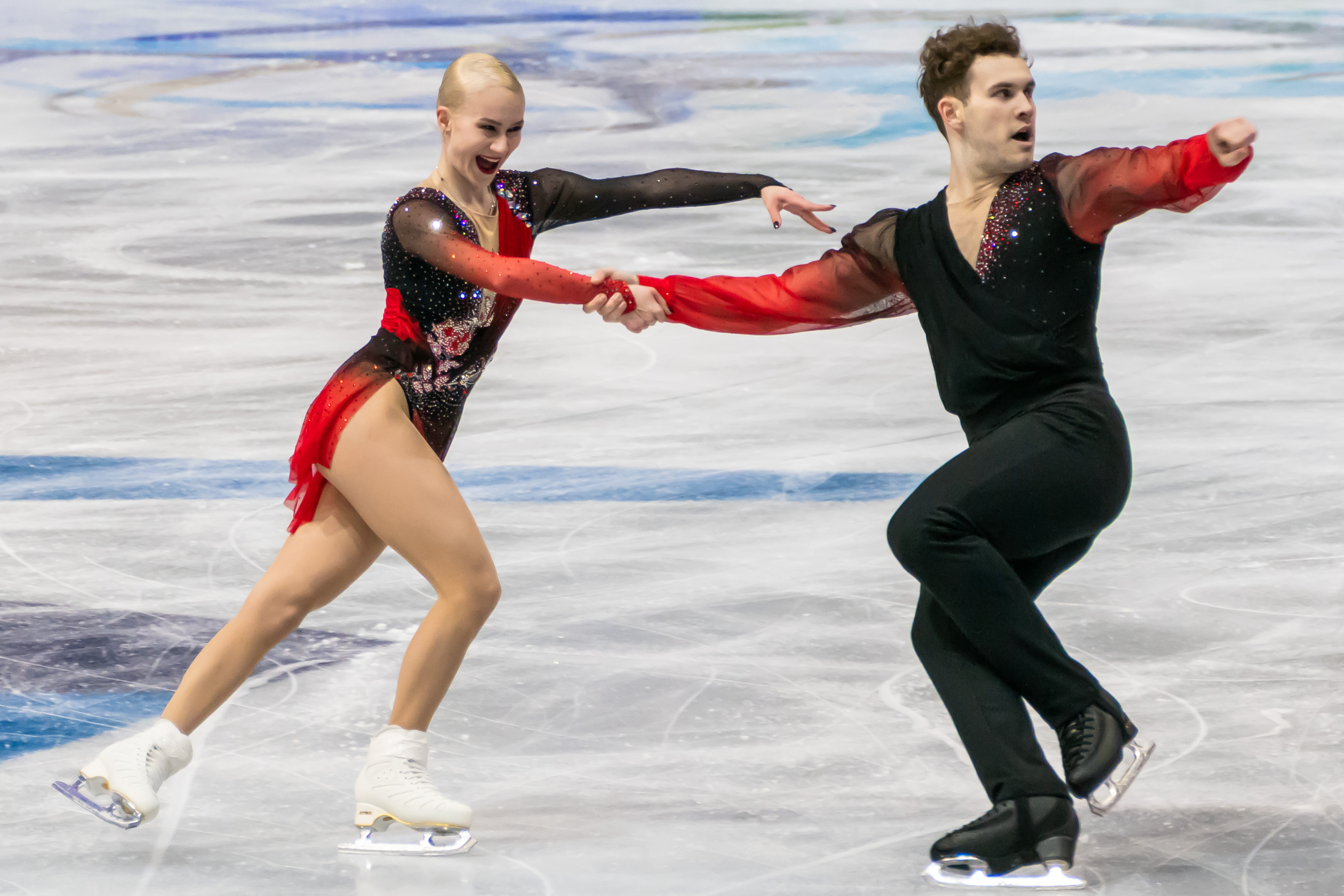
Väänänen and Clerici performing their short program at the 2025 World Championships

Väänänen/Clerici started the season by finishing seventh at the 2024 CS John Nicks International Pairs Competition. Going on to compete on the 2024–25 Grand Prix series, the pair placed eighth at 2024 Skate America and seventh at the 2024 Finlandia Trophy.

Following a tenth-place finish at the 2024 CS Golden Spin of Zagreb, the pair would go on to win their third consecutive national title at the 2025 Finnish Championships.

Selected to compete at the 2025 European Championships in Tallinn, Estonia the pair finished in fourteenth place. They followed this up with a fifth-place finish at the 2025 Merano Ice Trophy. Väänänen/Clerici then finished the season by placing nineteenth at the 2025 World Championships in Boston, Massachusetts, United States.

In April, it was announced that the pair had parted ways.

== Programs ==
=== With Clerici ===
Season	Short program	Free skating	Exhibition
2024–25	The Last Verdict (from La resa dei conti) by Ennio Morricone; Don't Let Me Be Misunderstood by Santa Esmeralda choreo. by Luca Lanotte	Young and Beautiful by Lana Del Rey; Help by Hurts choreo. by Luca Lanotte	
2023–24	Bad to the Bone performed by 2WEI and Bri Bryant choreo. by Luca Lanotte	Young and Beautiful by Lana Del Rey; Help by Hurts choreo. by Luca Lanotte	Ievan polkka by Eino Kettunen performed by Riikka

=== With Akulov ===
Season	Short program	Free skating
2021–22	Until I Find You by ALIBI Music choreo. by Kristina Stepanova	Who Wants to Live Forever by Queen choreo. by Kristina Stepanova

== Competitive highlights ==
- GP – Event of the ISU Grand Prix Series
- JGP – Event of the ISU Junior Grand Prix Series
- CS – Event of the ISU Challenger Series

=== Pair skating with Filippo Clerici ===
Competition placements at senior level
Season	2022–23	2023–24	2024–25
World Championships		18th	19th
European Championships		14th	14th
Finnish Championships	1st	1st	1st
GP Finland		8th	7th
GP Skate America			8th
CS Finlandia Trophy		4th	
CS Golden Spin of Zagreb		1st	10th
CS John Nicks Pairs			7th
CS Lombardia Trophy		7th	
Merano Ice Trophy			5th
Tayside Trophy		3rd	

=== Pair skating with Mikhail Akulov ===
Competition placements at senior level
Season	2021–22
European Championships	20th
Finnish Championships	1st
CS Finlandia Trophy	14th
CS Golden Spin of Zagreb	16th
Challenge Cup	4th

=== Single skating ===
Competition placements at junior level
Season	2017–18	2018–19
Finnish Championships	20th	2nd
JGP Czech Republic		15th
Christmas Cup		5th
Egna Spring Trophy	11th	
Jégvirág Cup	5th	

== Detailed results ==
=== Pair skating with Clerici ===
ISU personal best scores in the +5/-5 GOE System
Segment	Type	Score	Event
Total	TSS	172.31	2023 CS Golden Spin of Zagreb
Short program	TSS	60.95	2023 CS Golden Spin of Zagreb
Short program	TES	34.35	2023 CS Golden Spin of Zagreb
Short program	PCS	26.70	2024 Skate America
Free skating	TSS	111.36	2023 CS Golden Spin of Zagreb
Free skating	TES	59.91	2024 CS John Nicks Pairs Competition
Free skating	PCS	53.54	2023 CS Golden Spin of Zagreb

Results in the 2024–25 season
Date	Event	SP		FS		Total	
Date	Event	P	Score	P	Score	P	Score
Sep 3–4, 2024	(United States) 2024 CS John Nicks Pairs Competition	7	56.44	6	108.84	7	165.48
Oct 18–20, 2024	(United States) 2024 Skate America	7	60.23	8	96.32	8	156.55
Nov 15–17, 2024	(Finland) 2024 Finlandia Trophy	6	54.33	7	106.40	7	160.73
Dec 4-7, 2024	(Croatia) 2024 CS Golden Spin of Zagreb	10	49.69	10	94.82	10	144.51
Dec 13-15, 2024	(Finland) 2025 Finnish Championships	1	56.60	1	104.46	1	161.06
Jan 28 – Feb 2, 2025	(Estonia) 2025 European Championships	16	51.68	14	100.24	14	151.92
Feb 13-16, 2025	(Italy) 2025 Merano Ice Trophy	7	47.13	3	104.52	5	151.65
Mar 25–30, 2025	(United States) 2025 World Championships	16	57.82	20	97.99	19	155.81
