= Filippo Clerici =

Italian pair skater

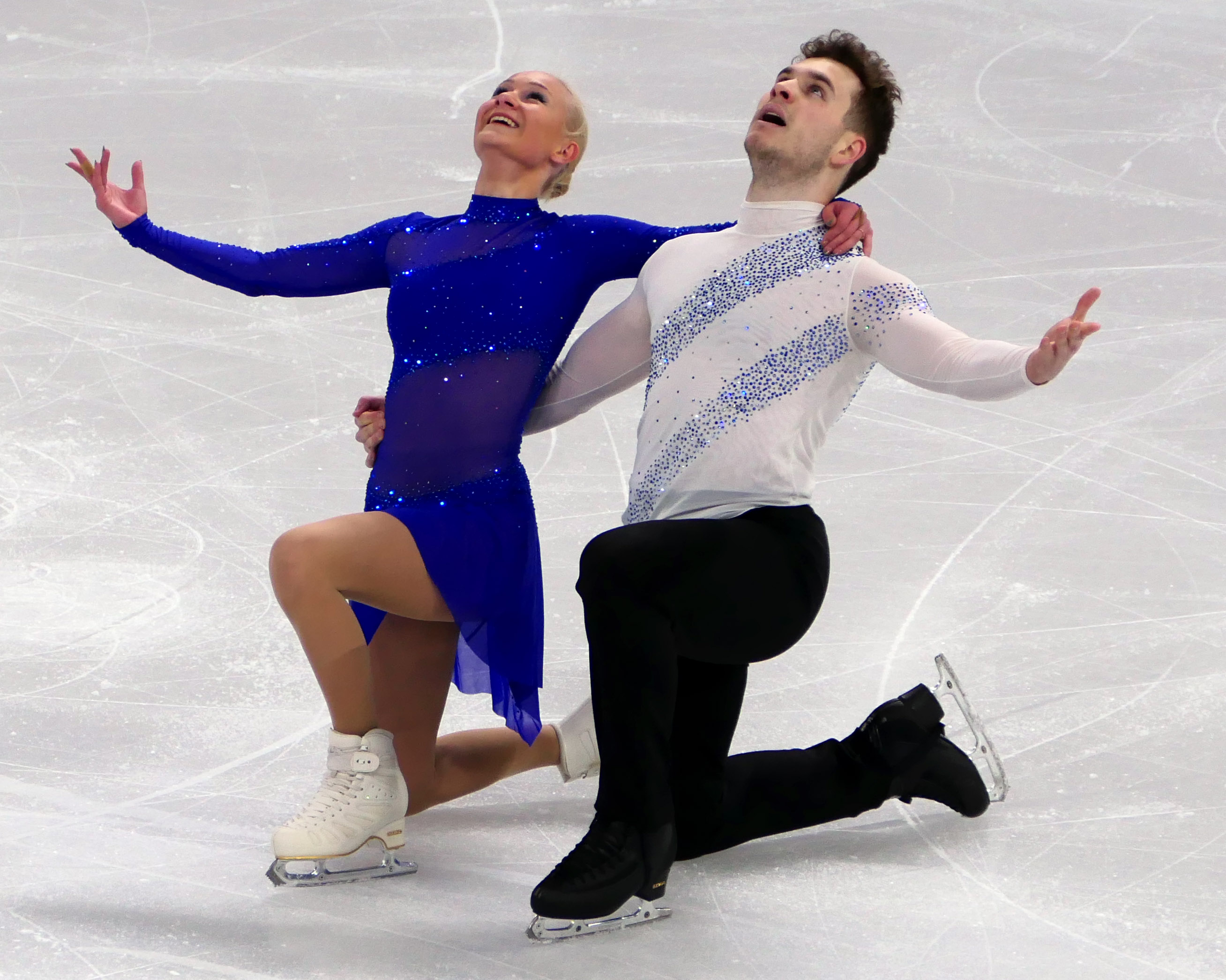
- Milania Väänänen and Filippo Clerici at the 2024 World Championships

Personal information
- Full name: Filippo Clerici
- Born: 7 March 2001 (age 25) Como, Italy
- Home town: Cirimido, Italy
- Height: 1.76 m (5 ft 9 1/2 in)

Figure skating career
- Country: Finland (2022–25); Italy (2013–21)
- Discipline: Pair skating (since 2020); Men's singles (2013–20)
- Partner: Milania Väänänen (2022-26); Alyssa Montan (2021–22); Anna Valesi (2020–21)
- Coach: Luca Demattè; Ondřej Hotárek; Daniel Aggiano; Rosanna Murante
- Skating club: Porvoon Skating Club
- Began skating: 2008

Medal record
Finnish Championships
Gold medal – first place	2023 Joensuu	Pairs
Gold medal – first place	2024 Helsinki	Pairs
Gold medal – first place	2025 Rauma	Pairs

Filippo Clerici (born 7 March 2001) is an Italian pair skater who currently competes for Finland. With his former skating partner, Milania Väänänen, he is the 2023 Golden Spin of Zagreb gold medalist, 2023 Tayside Trophy bronze medalist, and three-time Finnish national champion (2023–25).

== Personal life ==
Clerici was born on 7 March 2001 in Como, Italy. After pairing up with Milania Väänänen in 2022, Clerici began learning how to speak Finnish.

== Career ==
=== Early career ===
Clerici began figure skating in 2008. He initially competed as a singles skater before switching to pairs in 2020. His first pair partner was Anna Valesi whom he won the 2021 Italian Championships with on the junior level.

The following season, he competed with Alyssa Montan on the junior level, placing eighth at 2021 JGP Slovakia and eleventh at 2021 JGP Austria. They went on to win gold at the 2022 Italian Junior Championships and competed at the 2022 World Junior Championships, finishing eighth. Montan/Clerici's partnership dissolved after the season ended.

=== 2022–23 season ===
Clerici considered retiring from competitive figure skating following the end of his previous partnership due to no longer being eligible to compete on the junior level and the increasing level of depth in Italian pair skating. However, Clerici's coaches, Luca Demattè, Ondrej Hotarek, and Rosanna Murante were contacted by Finnish-based Italian skating coach, Maurizio Margaglio, and informed that Finnish pair skater, Milania Väänänen, was searching for a new partner. Following a successful tryout, Väänänen moved to Bergamo so they could train together. They decided to represent Finland.

The newly formed team of Väänänen and Clerici competed only once during the 2022–23 season, winning the 2023 Finnish Champions in December 2022. They were ineligible to compete at spring championship events as they had not attained their technical minimums through international competition in the fall.

=== 2023–24 season ===
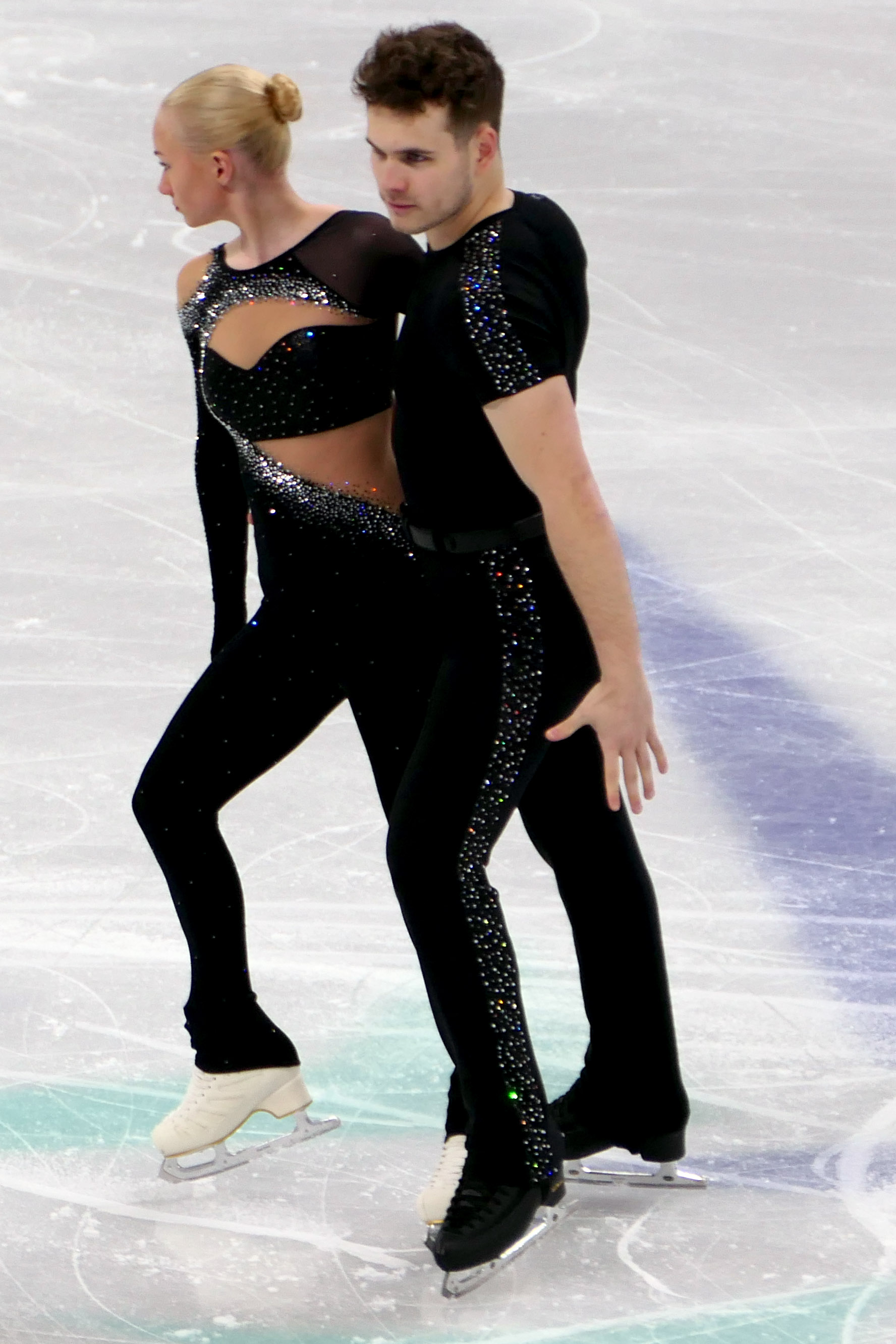
Väänänen/Clerici performing their short program at the 2024 World Championships

Väänänen and Clerici began their season with the goal of attaining their ISU technical minimum scores to be eligible to compete at the 2024 European Championships and the World Championships. The team mearned their minimums during their international debut at the 2023 Lombardia Trophy, where they finished in seventh place. Following the event, Clerici commented, "We are really happy to have reached the technical point limits for the European Championship and the World Championship... Next we will focus on the levels and the quality of the elements in order to increase our points."

At their next event, the 2023 Finlandia Trophy, Väänänen and Clerici were warmly received by a home audience. They placed sixth in the short program and rose to fourth in the free skate with a new personal best score to finish in fourth place overall. The following week, the team competed at the 2023 Tayside Trophy, where they won their first international medal: a bronze medal.

Selected to compete at the 2023 Grand Prix of Espoo, Väänänen/Clerici finished eighth. The pair then went on to win gold at both 2023 CS Golden Spin of Zagreb and the 2023–24 Finnish Championships.

At the 2024 European Championships in Kaunas, Lithuania, the pair finished in fourteenth place. They went on to compete at the 2024 World Championships in Montreal, Quebec, Canada, the pair placed nineteenth in the short program and seventeenth in the free skate, finishing eighteenth overall. Väänänen/Clerici became the first Finnish pair team to qualify for the free skate at a World Championships.

==== 2024–25 season: End of Väänänen/Clerici ====
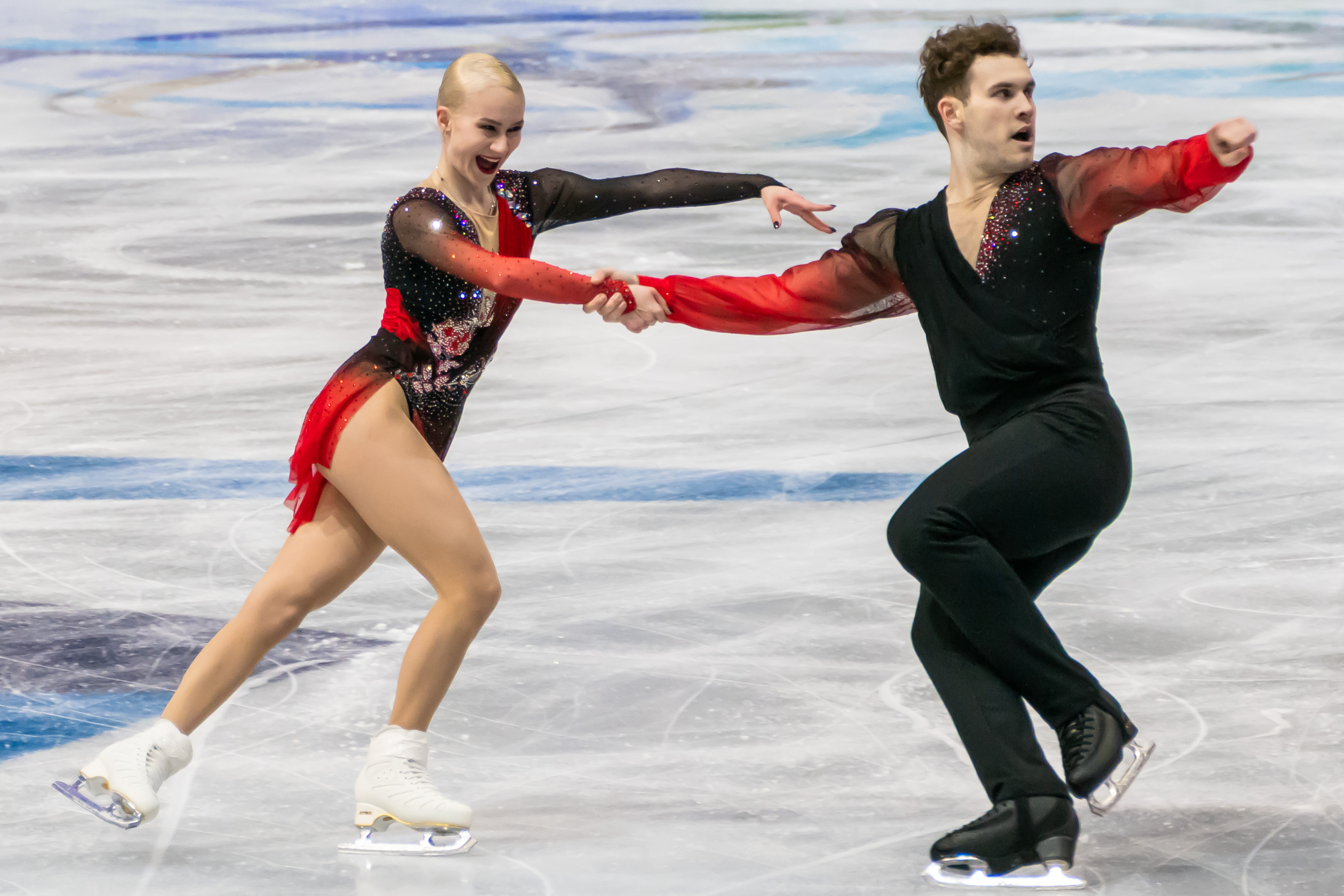
Väänänen and Clerici performing their short program at the 2025 World Championships

Väänänen/Clerici started the season by finishing seventh at the 2024 CS John Nicks International Pairs Competition. Going on to compete on the 2024–25 Grand Prix series, the pair placed eighth at 2024 Skate America and seventh at the 2024 Finlandia Trophy.

Following a tenth-place finish at the 2024 CS Golden Spin of Zagreb, the pair would go on to win their third consecutive national title at the 2025 Finnish Championships.

Selected to compete at the 2025 European Championships in Tallinn, Estonia, the pair finished in fourteenth place. They followed this up with a fifth-place finish at the 2025 Merano Ice Trophy. Väänänen/Clerici then finished the season by placing nineteenth at the 2025 World Championships in Boston, Massachusetts, United States.

In April, it was announced that the pair had parted ways.

== Programs ==
=== Pair skating with Milania Väänänen ===
Season	Short program	Free skating	Exhibition
2024–25	The Last Verdict (from La resa dei conti) by Ennio Morricone; Don't Let Me Be Misunderstood by Santa Esmeralda choreo. by Luca Lanotte	Young and Beautiful by Lana Del Rey; Help by Hurts choreo. by Luca Lanotte	
2023–24	Bad to the Bone performed by 2WEI and Bri Bryant choreo. by Luca Lanotte	Young and Beautiful by Lana Del Rey; Help by Hurts choreo. by Luca Lanotte	Ievan polkka by Eino Kettunen performed by Riikka

=== Pair skating with Alyssa Montan ===
Season	Short program	Free skating
2021–2022	Il Poeta en el Mar by Vicente Amigo choreo. by Anna Cappellini, Ondrej Hotarek	Lupin III '80 Theme (Live Version); The Village Inn (from The Pink Panther); Lupin III '78 Theme by Henry Mancini choreo. by Anna Cappellini, Ondrej Hotarek

== Competitive highlights ==
- GP – Event of the ISU Grand Prix Series
- JGP – Event of the ISU Junior Grand Prix Series
- CS – Event of the ISU Challenger Series

=== Pair skating with Milania Väänänen (for Finland) ===
Competition placements at senior level
Season	2022–23	2023–24	2024–25
World Championships		18th	19th
European Championships		14th	14th
Finnish Championships	1st	1st	1st
GP Finland		8th	7th
GP Skate America			8th
CS Finlandia Trophy		4th	
CS Golden Spin of Zagreb		1st	10th
CS John Nicks Pairs			7th
CS Lombardia Trophy		7th	
Merano Ice Trophy			5th
Tayside Trophy		3rd	

=== Pair skating with Alyssa Montan (for Italy) ===
Competition placements at junior level
Season	2021–22
World Junior Championships	8th
Italian Championships	1st
JGP Austria	11th
JGP Slovakia	8th
Bavarian Open	4th
Budapest Trophy	3rd
IceLab Cup	2nd

=== Pair skating with Anna Valesi (for Italy) ===
Competition placements at junior level
Season	2020–21
Italian Championships	2nd

=== Single skating (for Italy) ===
Competition placements at junior level
Season	2016–17	2017–18	2018–19	2019–20
Italian Championships	7th	5th	4th	5th
Cup of Tyrol	9th		4th	
Egna Spring Trophy		5th		
Halloween Cup				7th
IceLab Cup				4th
Ice Star			11th	
Prague Skate			4th	5th
Sofia Trophy	5th			5th

== Detailed results ==
=== Pair skating with Väänänen ===
ISU personal best scores in the +5/-5 GOE System
Segment	Type	Score	Event
Total	TSS	172.31	2023 CS Golden Spin of Zagreb
Short program	TSS	60.95	2023 CS Golden Spin of Zagreb
Short program	TES	34.35	2023 CS Golden Spin of Zagreb
Short program	PCS	26.70	2024 Skate America
Free skating	TSS	111.36	2023 CS Golden Spin of Zagreb
Free skating	TES	59.91	2024 CS John Nicks Pairs Competition
Free skating	PCS	53.54	2023 CS Golden Spin of Zagreb

Results in the 2024–25 season
Date	Event	SP		FS		Total	
Date	Event	P	Score	P	Score	P	Score
3–4 Sep, 2024	(United States) 2024 CS John Nicks Pairs Competition	7	56.44	6	108.84	7	165.48
18–20 Oct, 2024	(United States) 2024 Skate America	7	60.23	8	96.32	8	156.55
15–17 Nov, 2024	(Finland) 2024 Finlandia Trophy	6	54.33	7	106.40	7	160.73
4-7 Dec, 2024	(Croatia) 2024 CS Golden Spin of Zagreb	10	49.69	10	94.82	10	144.51
13-15 Dec, 2024	(Finland) 2025 Finnish Championships	1	56.60	1	104.46	1	161.06
28 Jan – 2 Feb, 2025	(Estonia) 2025 European Championships	16	51.68	14	100.24	14	151.92
13-16 Feb, 2025	(Italy) 2025 Merano Ice Trophy	7	47.13	3	104.52	5	151.65
25–30 Mar, 2025	(United States) 2025 World Championships	16	57.82	20	97.99	19	155.81
