= 2023 CS Golden Spin of Zagreb =

Figure skating competition

- Type: ISU Challenger Series
- Date: December 6 – 9
- Season: 2023–24
- Location: Sisak, Croatia
- Host: Croatian Skating Federation
- Venue: Velesajam Ice Skating Rink

Champions
- Men's singles: (China) Jin Boyang
- Women's singles: (Italy) Sarina Joos
- Pairs: (Finland) Milania Väänänen / Filippo Clerici
- Ice dance: (Lithuania) Allison Reed / Saulius Ambrulevičius
- Previous: 2022 CS Golden Spin of Zagreb
- Next: 2024 CS Golden Spin of Zagreb
- Previous CS: 2023 CS Warsaw Cup

The 2023 CS Golden Spin of Zagreb was held on December 6–9, 2023, in Sisak, Croatia. It was the ninth and final event of the 2023–24 ISU Challenger Series. Medals were awarded in men's singles, women's singles, pair skating, and ice dance.

== Entries ==
The International Skating Union published the list of entries on November 20, 2023.

| Country | Men | Women | Pairs | Ice dance |
|---|---|---|---|---|
| Australia | | | | Holly Harris / Jason Chan; India Nette / Eron Westwood |
| Austria | Maurizio Zandron | Olga Mikutina | | |
| Azerbaijan | | | | Adrienne Carhart / Oleksandr Kolosovskyi; Samantha Ritter / Daniel Brykalov |
| Belgium | | Jade Hovine | | |
| Brazil | | | | Natalia Pallu-Neves / Jayin Panesar |
| China | Jin Boyang | | Yang Yixi / Deng Shunyang | |
| Croatia | Jari Kessler | | | |
| Estonia | Aleksandr Selevko | Nataly Langerbaur; Kristina Lisovskaja; Niina Petrõkina | | Solène Mazingue / Marko Jevgeni Gaidajenko |
| Finland | Makar Suntsev | Oona Ounasvuori | Milania Väänänen / Filippo Clerici | |
| France | | Clémence Mayindu | Aurélie Faula / Théo Belle | |
| Germany | | Kristina Isaev | | Charise Matthaei / Max Liebers |
| Great Britain | Edward Appleby | Kristen Spours | | Phebe Bekker / James Hernandez |
| Hungary | | Katinka Anna Zsembery | | Lucy Hancock / Ilias Fourati |
| Ireland | Dillon Judge | | | Carolane Soucisse / Shane Firus |
| Italy | | Lara Naki Gutmann; Sarina Joos; Anna Pezzetta | | Victoria Manni / Carlo Röthlisberger |
| Japan | | | | Azusa Tanaka / Shingo Nishiyama; Utana Yoshida / Masaya Morita |
| Kazakhstan | Mikhail Shaidorov | | | |
| Lithuania | | | | Paulina Ramanauskaitė / Deividas Kizala; Allison Reed / Saulius Ambrulevičius |
| Malaysia | Ze Zeng Fang | Katherine Ong Pui Kuan | | |
| Poland | Vladimir Samoilov | Marietta Atkins | Ioulia Chtchetinina / Michal Wozniak | Olexandra Borysova / Aaron Freeman |
| Slovakia | | Ema Doboszová | | |
| Slovenia | David Sedej | | | |
| South Africa | | | Julia Mauder / Johannes Wilkinson | |
| South Korea | | Ji Seo-yeon | | |
| Spain | | Emilia Murdock | | |
| Sweden | | | Greta Crafoord / John Crafoord | Emma Kivioja / Erik Pellnor |
| Switzerland | Georgii Pavlov | | | Arianna Sassi / Luca Morini |
| Ukraine | | Anastasia Gozhva | Sofiia Holichenko / Artem Darenskyi | |
| United States | Goku Endo; Tomoki Hiwatashi | Starr Andrews; Amber Glenn | Valentina Plazas / Maximiliano Fernandez | Isabella Flores / Ivan Desyatov; Emilea Zingas / Vadym Kolesnik |

=== Changes to preliminary assignments ===
| Date | Discipline | Withdrew | Added | Notes | Ref. |
|---|---|---|---|---|---|
| November 23 | Men | (Kazakhstan) Dias Jirenbayev | (Finland) Makar Suntsev | | |
| November 23 | Men | (United States) Andrew Torgashev | (United States) Goku Endo | | |
| November 23 | Women | (Kazakhstan) Sofiya Farafonova | —N/a | | |
| November 23 | Women | (Switzerland) Kimmy Repond | —N/a | | |
| November 23 | Women | (Ukraine) Yelizaveta Babenko | —N/a | | |
| November 23 | Pairs | (Austria) Giorgia Ghedini / Luc Maierhofer | —N/a | | |
| November 23 | Pairs | (Austria) Sophia Schaller / Livio Mayr | —N/a | | |
| November 28 | Men | (Bulgaria) Alexander Zlatkov | —N/a | | |
| November 28 | Men | (France) Kévin Aymoz | —N/a | Event conflict (2023–24 Grand Prix Final) | |
| November 28 | Women | (Cyprus) Marilena Kitromilis | —N/a | | |
| November 28 | Women | (France) Maé-Bérénice Méité | —N/a | | |
| November 28 | Women | (Moldova) Anastasia Gracheva | —N/a | | |
| November 28 | Women | (Netherlands) Lindsay van Zundert | —N/a | | |
| November 28 | Women | (Philippines) Sofia Lexi Jacqueline Frank | —N/a | | |
| November 28 | Women | (Slovenia) Julija Lovrenčič | —N/a | | |
| November 28 | Pairs | (Italy) Rebecca Ghilardi / Filippo Ambrosini | —N/a | Event conflict (2023–24 Grand Prix Final) | |
| November 30 | Men | (Armenia) Semen Daniliants | —N/a | | |
| December 4 | Men | (Armenia) Fedor Chitipakhovian | —N/a | | |
| December 4 | Women | —N/a | (United Kingdom) Kristen Spours | | |
| December 4 | Pairs | (Czech Republic) Federica Simioli / Alessandro Zarbo | —N/a | | |
| December 4 | Pairs | (Philippines) Isabella Gamez / Alexander Korovin | —N/a | | |
| December 5 | Men | (Italy) Matteo Rizzo | —N/a | | |
| December 5 | Men | (Italy) Raffaele Francesco Zich | —N/a | | |
| December 5 | Men | (Canada) Roman Sadovsky | —N/a | Weather-related travel delays | |
| December 6 | Ice dance | (Germany) Karla Maria Karl / Kai Hoferichter | —N/a | | |
| December 6 | Men | (Estonia) Mihhail Selevko | —N/a | Lost luggage | |
| December 6 | Men | (France) Luc Economides | —N/a | | |
| December 7 | Women | (Hungary) Regina Schermann | —N/a | | |
| December 7 | Ice dance | (France) Loïcia Demougeot / Théo le Mercier | —N/a | Event conflict (French Championships) | |

== Results ==
=== Men's singles ===
| Rank | Skater | Nation | Total points | SP | | FS | |
|---|---|---|---|---|---|---|---|
| 1st place, gold medalist(s) | Jin Boyang | China | 258.67 | 1 | 91.25 | 1 | 167.42 |
| 2nd place, silver medalist(s) | Mikhail Shaidorov | Kazakhstan | 235.29 | 3 | 82.82 | 2 | 152.47 |
| 3rd place, bronze medalist(s) | Aleksandr Selevko | Estonia | 224.24 | 2 | 83.58 | 3 | 140.66 |
| 4 | Maurizio Zandron | Austria | 204.22 | 7 | 64.63 | 4 | 139.59 |
| 5 | Vladimir Samoilov | Poland | 202.43 | 4 | 69.64 | 6 | 132.79 |
| 6 | Edward Appleby | United Kingdom | 199.52 | 10 | 61.18 | 5 | 138.34 |
| 7 | Makar Suntsev | Finland | 198.30 | 6 | 67.67 | 7 | 130.63 |
| 8 | Goku Endo | United States | 197.59 | 5 | 69.31 | 9 | 128.28 |
| 9 | Tomoki Hiwatashi | United States | 191.72 | 8 | 63.22 | 8 | 128.50 |
| 10 | David Sedej | Slovenia | 178.31 | 9 | 62.81 | 11 | 115.50 |
| 11 | Jari Kessler | Croatia | 169.97 | 11 | 51.24 | 10 | 118.73 |
| 12 | Ze Zeng Fang | Malaysia | 158.25 | 13 | 49.62 | 12 | 108.63 |
| 13 | Georgii Pavlov | Switzerland | 157.61 | 12 | 49.79 | 13 | 107.82 |
| 14 | Dillon Judge | Ireland | 116.04 | 14 | 44.93 | 14 | 71.11 |

=== Women's singles ===
| Rank | Skater | Nation | Total points | SP | | FS | |
|---|---|---|---|---|---|---|---|
| 1st place, gold medalist(s) | Sarina Joos | Italy | 179.40 | 1 | 63.59 | 1 | 115.81 |
| 2nd place, silver medalist(s) | Amber Glenn | United States | 177.51 | 2 | 63.09 | 2 | 114.42 |
| 3rd place, bronze medalist(s) | Starr Andrews | United States | 165.55 | 6 | 53.98 | 3 | 111.57 |
| 4 | Anastasia Gozhva | Ukraine | 163.77 | 5 | 54.19 | 4 | 109.58 |
| 5 | Nataly Langerbaur | Estonia | 159.74 | 10 | 50.93 | 5 | 108.81 |
| 6 | Anna Pezzetta | Italy | 159.24 | 8 | 52.32 | 6 | 106.92 |
| 7 | Clémence Mayindu | France | 155.80 | 4 | 54.34 | 8 | 101.46 |
| 8 | Lara Naki Gutmann | Italy | 155.18 | 11 | 50.60 | 7 | 104.58 |
| 9 | Olga Mikutina | Austria | 153.90 | 3 | 58.08 | 10 | 95.82 |
| 10 | Kristina Lisovskaja | Estonia | 151.75 | 9 | 52.07 | 9 | 99.68 |
| 11 | Kristen Spours | Great Britain | 148.47 | 7 | 53.43 | 11 | 95.04 |
| 12 | Jade Hovine | Belgium | 137.08 | 13 | 48.20 | 12 | 88.88 |
| 13 | Kristina Isaev | Germany | 134.89 | 14 | 48.20 | 13 | 86.69 |
| 14 | Ema Doboszová | Slovakia | 125.62 | 12 | 49.38 | 15 | 76.24 |
| 15 | Oona Ounasvuori | Finland | 122.15 | 15 | 44.33 | 14 | 77.82 |
| 16 | Emilia Murdock | Spain | 110.90 | 17 | 40.82 | 16 | 70.08 |
| 17 | Katherine Ong Pui Kuan | Malaysia | 105.42 | 18 | 35.88 | 17 | 69.26 |
| 18 | Katinka Anna Zsembery | Hungary | 97.78 | 16 | 41.52 | 18 | 56.26 |
| WD | Niina Petrõkina | Estonia | withdrew from competition | | | | |
| WD | Ji Seo-yeon | South Korea | withdrew from competition | | | | |
| WD | Marietta Atkins | Poland | withdrew from competition | | | | |

=== Pairs ===
| Rank | Team | Nation | Total points | SP | | FS | |
|---|---|---|---|---|---|---|---|
| 1st place, gold medalist(s) | Milania Väänänen / Filippo Clerici | Finland | 172.31 | 1 | 60.95 | 1 | 111.36 |
| 2nd place, silver medalist(s) | Valentina Plazas / Maximiliano Fernandez | United States | 168.14 | 2 | 58.11 | 2 | 110.03 |
| 3rd place, bronze medalist(s) | Sofiia Holichenko / Artem Darenskyi | Ukraine | 162.17 | 3 | 55.92 | 3 | 106.25 |
| 4 | Ioulia Chtchetinina / Michal Wozniak | Poland | 159.15 | 4 | 54.12 | 4 | 105.03 |
| 5 | Greta Crafoord / John Crafoord | Sweden | 139.38 | 5 | 49.57 | 5 | 89.81 |
| 6 | Aurélie Faula / Théo Belle | France | 131.07 | 6 | 48.77 | 7 | 82.30 |
| 7 | Yang Yixi / Deng Shunyang | China | 128.01 | 7 | 42.10 | 6 | 85.91 |
| 8 | Julia Mauder / Johannes Wilkinson | South Africa | 117.04 | 8 | 38.63 | 8 | 78.41 |

=== Ice dance ===
| Rank | Team | Nation | Total points | RD | | FD | |
|---|---|---|---|---|---|---|---|
| 1st place, gold medalist(s) | Allison Reed / Saulius Ambrulevičius | Lithuania | 200.11 | 1 | 81.19 | 1 | 118.92 |
| 2nd place, silver medalist(s) | Emilea Zingas / Vadym Kolesnik | United States | 183.32 | 2 | 78.23 | 3 | 105.09 |
| 3rd place, bronze medalist(s) | Isabella Flores / Ivan Desyatov | United States | 180.62 | 3 | 72.47 | 2 | 108.15 |
| 4 | Phebe Bekker / James Hernandez | Great Britain | 169.74 | 4 | 66.78 | 4 | 102.96 |
| 5 | Utana Yoshida / Masaya Morita | Japan | 164.20 | 7 | 62.88 | 5 | 101.32 |
| 6 | Holly Harris / Jason Chan | Australia | 164.02 | 5 | 66.12 | 7 | 97.90 |
| 7 | Solène Mazingue / Marko Jevgeni Gaidajenko | Estonia | 163.75 | 6 | 63.86 | 6 | 99.89 |
| 8 | Victoria Manni / Carlo Röthlisberger | Italy | 160.35 | 8 | 62.83 | 8 | 97.52 |
| 9 | Azusa Tanaka / Shingo Nishiyama | Japan | 158.69 | 10 | 61.86 | 9 | 96.83 |
| 10 | Paulina Ramanauskaitė / Deividas Kizala | Lithuania | 156.91 | 9 | 62.34 | 10 | 94.57 |
| 11 | Charise Matthaei / Max Liebers | Germany | 148.14 | 11 | 58.51 | 12 | 89.63 |
| 12 | Carolane Soucisse / Shane Firus | Ireland | 144.45 | 15 | 54.04 | 11 | 90.41 |
| 13 | Arianna Sassi / Luca Morini | Switzerland | 142.50 | 12 | 55.89 | 14 | 86.61 |
| 14 | Adrienne Carhart / Oleksandr Kolosovskyi | Azerbaijan | 141.37 | 14 | 54.35 | 13 | 87.02 |
| 15 | Natalia Pallu-Neves / Jayin Panesar | Brazil | 138.74 | 13 | 54.60 | 15 | 84.14 |
| 16 | Lucy Hancock / Ilias Fourati | Hungary | 131.31 | 17 | 51.47 | 16 | 79.84 |
| 17 | India Nette / Eron Westwood | Australia | 126.95 | 18 | 49.23 | 17 | 77.72 |
| 18 | Emma Kivioja / Erik Pellnor | Sweden | 124.64 | 16 | 52.13 | 18 | 72.51 |
| 19 | Olexandra Borysova / Aaron Freeman | Poland | 111.37 | 19 | 45.72 | 19 | 65.65 |
| WD | Samantha Ritter / Daniel Brykalov | Azerbaijan | withdrew from competition | | | | |
