= Luc Maierhofer =

Austrian figure skater (born 2002)

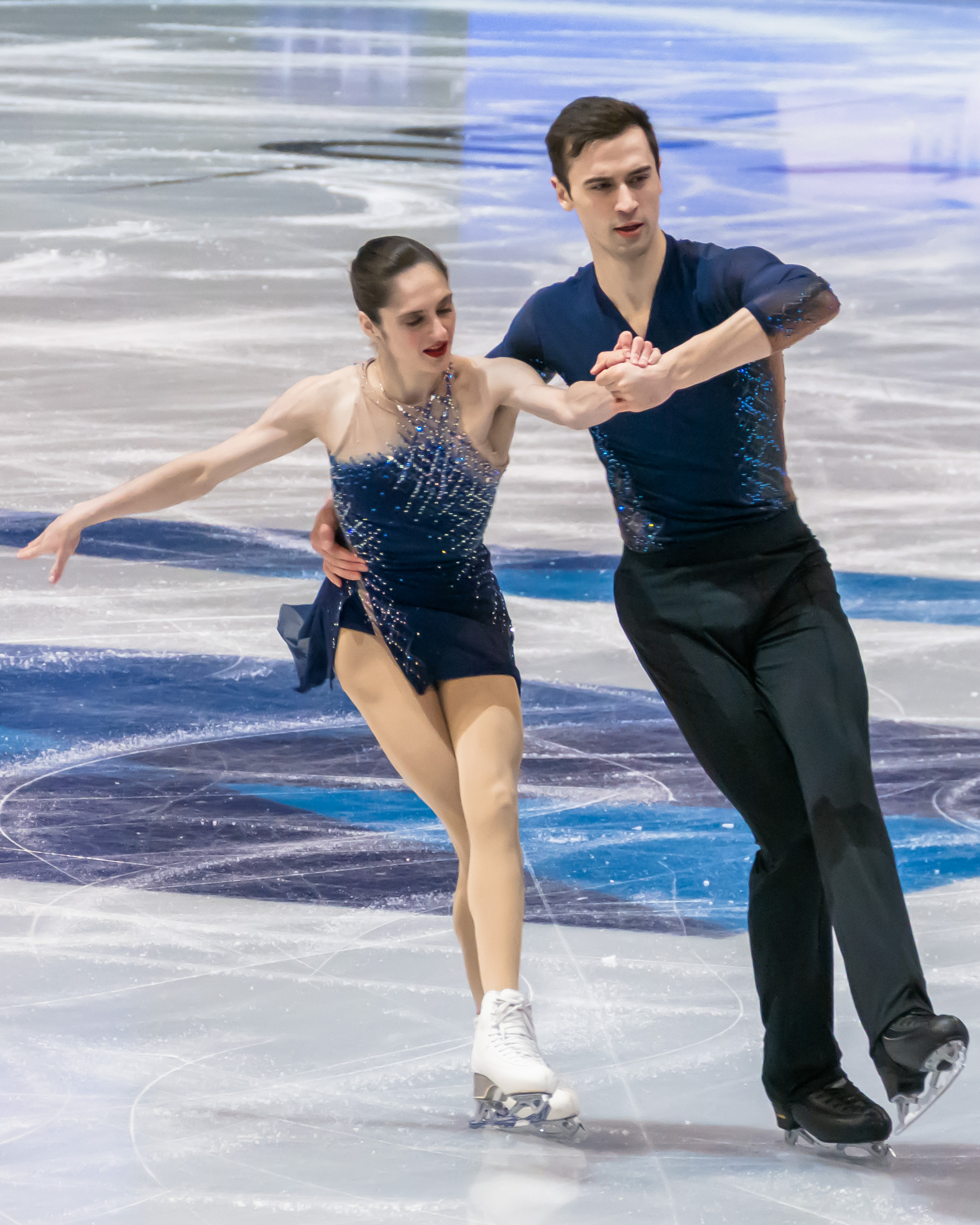
- Gabriella Izzo and Luc Maierhofer at the 2025 World Championships

Personal information
- Born: 24 May 2002 (age 24) Vienna, Austria
- Height: 1.90 m (6 ft 3 in)

Figure skating career
- Country: Austria
- Discipline: Pair skating (since 2022); Men's singles (2015–23)
- Partner: Gabriella Izzo (since 2024); Giorgia Ghedini (2022–23)
- Coach: Severin Kiefer; Aleksey Letov; Olga Ganicheva
- Skating club: Eissport Klub Engelmann Vienna
- Began skating: 2008

Medal record
Austrian Championships
Gold medal – first place	2022 Graz	Singles
Gold medal – first place	2026 Innsbruck	Pairs
Silver medal – second place	2019 Gmunden	Singles
Silver medal – second place	2021 Linz	Singles
Silver medal – second place	2023 St. Pölten	Singles
Silver medal – second place	2024 Feldkirch	Singles
Silver medal – second place	2025 Dornbirn	Pairs

Luc Maierhofer (born 24 May 2002) is an Austrian figure skater who currently competes in the pairs discipline with Gabriella Izzo. With Izzo, he is the 2026 Austrian national champion and the 2024 Ice Challenge champion.

With previous partner, Giorgia Ghedini, he is the 2023 Austrian junior national champion.

As a singles skater, he is the 2019 Golden Bear of Zagreb silver medalist and the 2022 Austrian national champion. On the junior level, he is the 2016 Dragon Trophy champion, the 2016 Skate Helena silver medalist, and a two-time Austrian junior national champion (2016, 2019).

== Personal life ==
Maierhofer was born 24 May 2002 in Vienna, Austria. His brother, Johannes Maierhofer, and half-sister Belinda Schönberger have also competed in figure skating. He is currently a student at the University of Innsbruck.

== Career ==
=== Single skating career ===
==== Early career ====
Maierhofer began learning to skate in 2008. Early in his career, he was coached by Sergei Gromov. He competed in the advanced novice ranks from autumn 2012 through March 2015.

==== 2015–16 season: Junior debut ====
Coached by Julia Lavrenchuk in Vienna, Maierhofer made his junior international debut on the 2015–16 ISU Junior Grand Prix series, finishing sixteenth at 2015 JGP Slovakia and eleventh at 2015 JGP Austria.

In December, Maierhofer won his first junior national title at the 2016 Austrian Championships. He went on to win silver at 2016 Skate Helena, gold at the 2016 Dragon Trophy, and finish fifth at the 2016 Hellmut Seibt Memorial.

Selected to compete at the 2016 World Junior Championships in Debrecen, Hungary, Maierhofer placed thirtieth in the short program but did not advance to the final segment. Following that season, Maierhofer relocated to Egna, Italy, to be coached by Lorenzo Magri.

==== 2016–17 season ====
Maierhofer started the season by competing on the 2016–17 ISU Junior Grand Prix series, finishing nineteenth at 2016 JGP Slovenia and twenty-first at 2016 JGP Germany. He then ended the season by finishing fourth on the junior level of the 2016 Golden Bear of Zagreb.

==== 2017–18 season: Senior debut ====
Maierhofer began the season by competing on the 2017–18 ISU Junior Grand Prix series, finishing fourteenth at 2017 JGP Austria and seventeenth at 2017 JGP Italy. Between the two events, Maierhofer made his senior international debut at the 2017 CS Nebelhorn Trophy, where he would finish twenty-sixth. Continuing to compete on the senior level, Maierhofer finished fifth at the 2017 Golden Bear of Zagreb, sixth at the 2018 Mentor Toruń Cup, and eleventh at the 2018 International Challenge Cup.

Going on to compete at the 2018 World Junior Championships in Sofia, Bulgaria, Maierhofer would finish forty-first in the short program and failed to advance to the free skate segment. He would then finish the season by placing seventh on the senior level of the 2018 Egna Spring Trophy.

==== 2018–19 season: European and World Championships debut ====
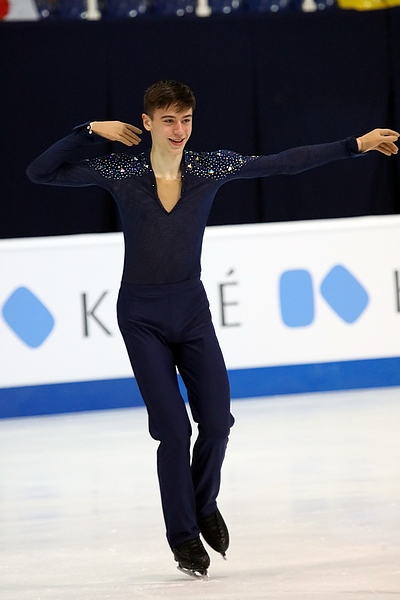
Luc Maierhofer at the 2019 World Junior Championships

Beginning the season by competing on the 2018–19 ISU Junior Grand Prix series, Maierhofer finished tenth at 2018 JGP Slovakia and ninth at 2018 JGP Austria. He subsequently went on to compete on the senior level, finishing fifth at the 2018 Golden Bear of Zagreb and the 2018 CS Inge Solar Memorial – Alpen Trophy, seventh at the 2018 Warsaw Cup, and sixteenth at the 2018 CS Golden Spin of Zagreb.

At the 2019 Austrian Championships in December, he won the junior men's title and finished second to Maurizio Zandron in the senior category. He was assigned to the 2019 European Championships because the Italian-born Zandron was not yet eligible to represent Austria in ISU events. Maierhofer qualified to the final segment at the European Championships, which took place in January in Minsk, Belarus. He placed twenty-first in the short program, nineteenth in the free skate, and twentieth overall.

In March, Maierhofer advanced to the free skate at the 2019 World Junior Championships in Zagreb, Croatia. He finished 18th after placing 14th in the short and 21st in the free. Later that month, he competed at the 2019 World Championships in Saitama, Japan. Ranked twenty-sixth in the short program, he did not advance to the free skate segment.

==== 2019–20 season ====
Maierhofer began his final season as a junior-level singles skater by competing on the 2019–20 ISU Junior Grand Prix series, finishing thirteenth at 2019 JGP Croatia and eighth at 2019 JGP Italy.

Going on to compete on the senior international level, Maierhofer finished sixth at the 2019 CS Ice Star. He subsequently won silver at the 2019 Golden Bear of Zagreb, gold at the 2019 Open d'Andorra. In February, he placed ninth at the 2020 Bavarian Open and eleventh at the 2020 Tallink Hotels Cup.

Selected to compete at the 2020 World Junior Championships in Tallinn, Estonia, Maierhofer finished twenty-fifth in the short program and failed to advance to the free skate.

==== 2020–21 season ====
During the season Maierhofer competed at two competitions: the 2021 Austrian Championships and the 2021 International Challenge Cup. He would finish second and eleventh, respectively, at these events.

==== 2021–22 season: Austrian national title ====
Maierhofer began the season by competing on the 2021–22 ISU Challenger Series, finishing sixteenth at the 2021 CS Lombardia Trophy. He withdrew from the 2021 CS Nebelhorn Trophy, but would go on to place eighteenth at the 2021 CS Finlandia Trophy and eleventh at the 2021 CS Cup of Austria. He would then win silver at the 2021 Open d'Andorra.

In December, Maierhofer won the senior men's national title at the 2022 Austrian Championships. He would then win silver at the 2022 Bavarian Open and the 2022 Merano Cup before closing the season with an eighth-place finish at the 2022 International Challenge Cup.

==== 2022–23 season ====
Maierhofer started the season by finishing fourth at the 2022 Volvo Open Cup. Going on to compete at the 2022–23 ISU Challenger Series, he placed twelfth at the 2022 CS Ice Challenge and tenth at the 2022 CS Warsaw Cup.

In December, he won the silver medal at the 2023 Austrian Championships. Selected to compete at the 2023 Winter World University Games, Maierhofer finished twentieth at the event.

After winning gold at the 2023 Dragon Trophy, Maierhofer finished the season by finishing thirteenth at the 2023 International Challenge Cup.

==== 2023–24 season ====
Maierhofer competed at two competitions during this season: the 2024 Austrian Championships and the 2024 Bavarian Open. He finished second and fourth, respectively, at these two events.

=== Pair skating career ===
==== 2022–23 season: Debut and end of Ghedini/Maierhofer ====
In late 2022, it was announced that while continuing to compete as a singles skater, Maierhofer would also compete in pair skating, having teamed up with Giorgia Ghedini. The pair trained at in Egna, Italy and were coached by Daniel Aggiano at the Young Goose Academy.

Together, the team won gold at the 2023 Austrian Junior Championships and silver on the junior level of the 2023 International Challenge Cup.

==== 2024–25 season: Debut of Izzo/Maierhofer ====
In July 2024, Maierhofer announced that he had teamed up with former American singles skater Gabriella Izzo and that they would be competing for Austria. It was subsequently announced that the pair would be coached by Severin Kiefer in Salzburg while also making trips to Norwood, Massachusetts, to work with Izzo's coaches, Aleksey Letov and Olga Ganicheva.

The pair made their international debut in November, winning the gold medal at the 2024 Ice Challenge. There, the pair also received the required minimum technical element scores to compete at the European and World Championships. They went on to compete on the 2024–25 ISU Challenger Series, finishing tenth at the 2024 CS Warsaw Cup and ninth at the 2024 CS Golden Spin of Zagreb.

In mid-December, Izzo/Maierhofer won the silver medal at the 2025 Austrian Championships behind Schaller/Mayr. They were subsequently named to the 2025 European Figure Skating Championships team, but they later had to withdraw due to illness.

The pair ended the season by making their World Championship debut, where they finished in twenty-third place.

==== 2025–26 season ====
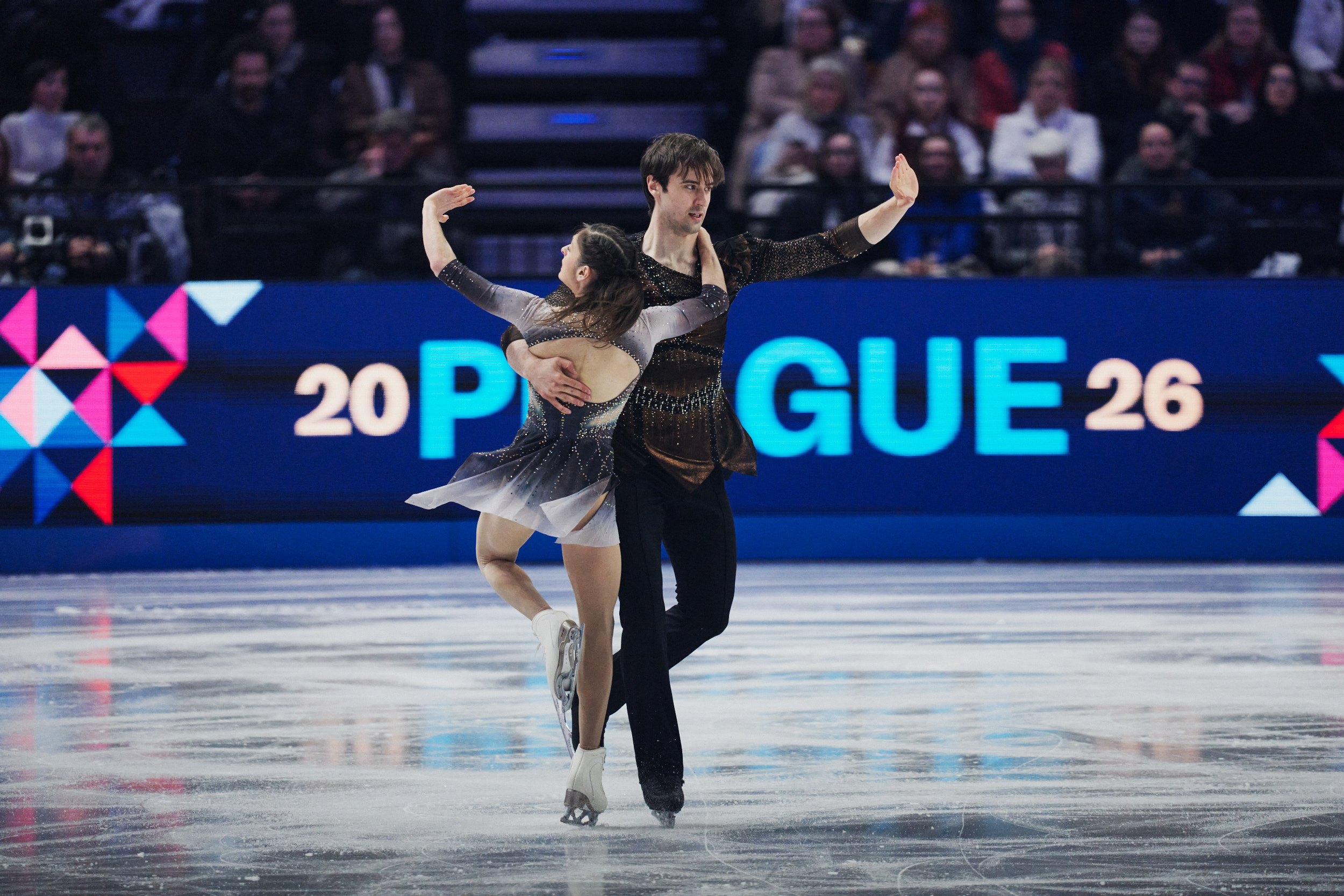
Izzo and Maierhofer at the 2026 World Championships

Izzo/Maierhofer opened their season by competing on the 2025–26 Challenger Series, placing eighth at the 2025 CS John Nicks International Pairs Competition and tenth at the 2025 CS Nebelhorn Trophy. They followed this up by finishing fourth at the 2025 Swiss Open, fourth at the 2025 Ice Challenge, and winning silver at the 2025 Cup of Innsbruck.

In December, they won their first national title at the 2026 Austrian Championships. The following month, they competed at the 2026 European Championships in Sheffield, England, United Kingdom, finishing in twelfth place. In March, they finished 14th at the 2026 World Championships.

== Programs ==
=== Pair skating with Izzo ===
Season	Short program	Free skating
2025–26	Padam, padam...; Milord by Édith Piaf performed by Legendis Orchestra choreo. by Mark Pillay	Troy; Hector's Death; Achilles Leads the Myrmadons by James Horner, Simon Rhodes, & David Foster; Remember performed by Josh Groban choreo. by Renée Roca
2024–25	Maybe I Maybe You by Scorpions choreo. by Renée Roca, Drew Meekins	Phantasia by Andrew Lloyd Webber, Julian Lloyd Webber, & Sarah Chang; The Music of the Night (from The Phantom of the Opera) by Andrew Lloyd Webber performed by Michael Crawford choreo. by Renée Roca, Drew Meekins

=== Singles skating ===
Season	Short program	Free skating
2022–23	She Was Waiting For Her Mother at the Station in Torino and You Know I Love You Baby But It's Getting Too Heavy to Laugh by Shawn Phillips choreo. by Benoît Richaud	Atonement by Dario Marianelli choreo. by Benoît Richaud
2021–22	She Was Waiting For Her Mother at the Station in Torino and You Know I Love You Baby But It's Getting Too Heavy to Laugh by Shawn Phillips choreo. by Benoît Richaud	Atonement by Dario Marianelli choreo. by Benoît Richaud
2019–20	Notte Stellata by Il Volo choreo. by Benoît Richaud	Across the Sky Instrumental by Rag'n'Bone Man; Iron Sky by Paolo Nutini choreo. by Benoît Richaud
2018–19	Paxi Ni Ngongo by Bonga choreo. by Benoît Richaud	What a Wonderful World performed by OneRepublic; Jump, Jive an' Wail by Louis Prima choreo. by Benoît Richaud
2017–18	The Marriage of Figaro by Wolfgang Amadeus Mozart choreo. by Benoît Richaud	Oblivion; Libertango by Astor Piazzolla choreo. by Benoît Richaud
2016–17	The Marriage of Figaro by Wolfgang Amadeus Mozart choreo. by Benoît Richaud	The Godfather by Nino Rota choreo. by Benoît Richaud
2015–16	Larrons en foire; Diabolique by Raphaël Beau; John Grey by Matvey Blanter choreo. by Alexei Vasilievski	Limelight; Modern Times by Charlie Chaplin choreo. by Alexei Vasilievski

== Competitive highlights ==
- JGP – Event of the ISU Junior Grand Prix Series
- CS – Event of the ISU Challenger Series
- TBD – Assigned
- WD – Withdrew from competition

=== Pair skating with Gabriella Izzo ===
Competition placements at senior level
Season	2024–25	2025–26
World Championships	23rd	14th
European Championships		12th
Austrian Championships	2nd	1st
CS Golden Spin of Zagreb	9th	
CS John Nicks Pairs		8th
CS Nebelhorn Trophy		10th
CS Warsaw Cup	10th	
Challenge Cup	6th	
Cup of Innsbruck		2nd
Ice Challenge	1st	4th
Merano Ice Trophy	3rd	

=== Pair skating with Giorgia Ghedini ===
Competition placements at junior level
Season	2022–23
Austrian Championships	1st
Challenge Cup	2nd

=== Single skating ===
Competition placements at senior level
Season	2017–18	2018–19	2019–20	2020–21	2021–22	2022–23	2023–24
World Championships		26th					
European Championships		20th					
Austrian Championships	WD	2nd		2nd	1st	2nd	2nd
CS Alpen Trophy		5th					
CS Finlandia Trophy					18th		
CS Golden Spin of Zagreb		16th	WD				
CS Ice Challenge					11th	12th	
CS Ice Star			6th				
CS Lombardia Trophy					16th		
CS Nebelhorn Trophy	26th						
CS Warsaw Cup		7th				10th	
Bavarian Open			9th		2nd		4th
Challenge Cup	11th			11th	8th	13th	
Dragon Trophy						1st	
Egna Spring Trophy	7th						
Golden Bear of Zagreb	5th	5th	2nd				
Mentor Cup	6th						
Merano Cup					2nd		
Open d'Andorra			1st		2nd		
Tallink Hotels Cup			11th				
Volvo Open Cup						4th	
World University Games						20th	

Competition placements at junior level
Season	2015–16	2016–17	2017–18	2018–19	2019–20
World Junior Championships	30th		41st	18th	25th
Austrian Championships	1st			1st	
JGP Austria	11th		14th	9th	
JGP Croatia					13th
JGP Germany		21st			
JGP Italy			17th		8th
JGP Slovakia	16th			10th	
JGP Slovenia		19th			
Dragon Trophy	1st				
Golden Bear of Zagreb		4th			
Hellmut Seibt Memorial	5th				
Skate Helena	2nd				

== Detailed results ==
ISU personal best scores in the +5/-5 GOE System
Segment	Type	Score	Event
Total	TSS	171.24	2025 CS Nebelhorn Trophy
Short program	TSS	62.13	2025 CS Nebelhorn Trophy
Short program	TES	35.32	2025 CS John Nicks Pairs Challenge
Short program	PCS	27.20	2025 CS Nebelhorn Trophy
Free skating	TSS	112.39	2026 World Championships
Free skating	TES	60.30	2026 World Championships
Free skating	PCS	54.20	2025 CS Nebelhorn Trophy

=== Pair skating with Gabriella Izzo ===
Results in the 2024–25 season
Date	Event	SP		FS		Total	
Date	Event	P	Score	P	Score	P	Score
Nov 5–10, 2024	(Austria) 2024 Ice Challenge	3	51.69	1	112.13	1	163.82
Nov 20–24, 2024	(Poland) 2024 CS Warsaw Cup	15	38.87	8	95.13	10	134.00
Dec 4–7, 2024	(Croatia) 2024 CS Golden Spin of Zagreb	9	51.68	9	98.92	9	150.60
Dec 11–15, 2024	(Austria) 2025 Austrian Championships	2	47.46	1	111.57	2	159.03
Feb 13–16, 2025	(Italy) 2025 Merano Ice Trophy	3	54.46	4	103.06	3	157.52
Feb 13–16, 2025	(Netherlands) 2025 Challenge Cup	6	37.22	6	76.02	6	113.24
Mar 25–30, 2025	(United States) 2025 World Championships	23	48.20	—N/a	—N/a	23	48.20

Results in the 2025–26 season
Date	Event	SP		FS		Total	
Date	Event	P	Score	P	Score	P	Score
Sep 2–3, 2025	(United States) 2025 CS John Nicks International Pairs Competition	8	59.59	8	105.41	8	165.00
Sep 25–27, 2025	(Germany) 2025 CS Nebelhorn Trophy	9	62.13	10	109.11	10	171.24
Nov 5–9, 2025	(Austria) 2025 Ice Challenge	4	59.03	4	102.98	4	162.01
Nov 13–16, 2025	(Austria) 2025 Cup of Innsbruck	2	62.15	4	94.10	2	156.25
Dec 10–13, 2025	(Austria) 2026 Austrian Championships	1	60.71	1	111.97	1	172.68
Jan 13–18, 2026	(United Kingdom) 2026 European Championships	11	54.65	12	103.43	12	158.08
Mar 24–29, 2026	(Czech Republic) 2026 World Championships	19	58.22	14	112.39	14	170.61
