= Tayside Trophy =

International figure skating competition

- Status: Active
- Genre: International competition
- Frequency: Annual
- Venue: Dundee Ice Arena
- Location: Dundee, Scotland
- Country: (United Kingdom) Great Britain
- Inaugurated: 2019
- Next event: 2026
- Organizer: British Ice Skating

The Tayside Trophy is an annual figure skating competition sanctioned by the International Skating Union (ISU), organized and hosted by British Ice Skating at the Dundee Ice Arena in Dundee, Scotland, in the United Kingdom. The competition debuted in 2019. Medals may be awarded in men's singles, women's singles, and pair skating at the senior, junior, and novice levels.

== Senior medalists ==
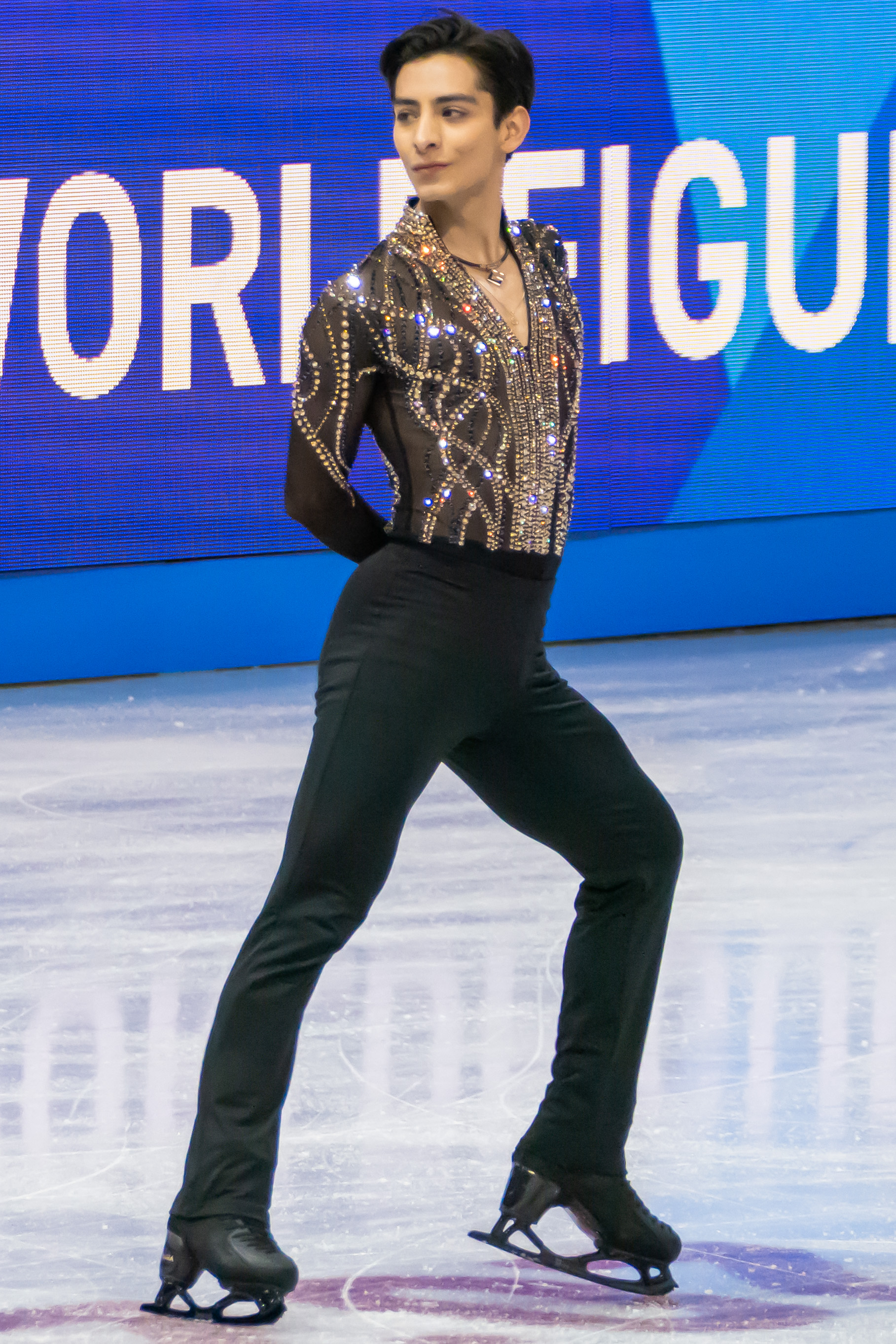
The 2026 Tayside Trophy champions: Donovan Carrillo of Mexico (men's singles), Olga Mikutina of Austria (women's singles) and Ava Kemp and Yohnatan Elizarov of Canada (pair skating) (not pictured)

=== Men's singles ===
Men's event medalists
Year	Gold	Silver	Bronze	Ref.
2019	(United Kingdom) Peter James Hallam	(United Kingdom) Graham Newberry	(United Kingdom) Harry Mattick	
2020	Competition cancelled due to the COVID-19 pandemic			
2021	(Austria) Maurizio Zandron	(France) Romain Ponsart	(United Kingdom) Peter James Hallam	
2022	(Austria) Maurizio Zandron	(United Kingdom) Edward Appleby	(Poland) Kornel Witkowski	
2023	(Austria) Maurizio Zandron	(Mexico) Donovan Carrillo	(United Kingdom) Ken Fitterer	
2024	(Austria) Maurizio Zandron	(Italy) Corey Circelli	(Spain) Tomàs-Llorenç Guarino Sabaté	
2025	(Croatia) Jari Kessler	(Austria) Maurizio Zandron	(United States) Michael Xie	
2026	(Mexico); Donovan Carrillo	(Israel); Mark Gorodnitsky	(Switzerland); Ean Weiler	

=== Women's singles ===
Women's event medalists
Year	Gold	Silver	Bronze	Ref.
2019	(United Kingdom) Natasha McKay	(United Kingdom) Karly Robertson	(Lithuania) Aleksandra Golovkina	
2020	Competition cancelled due to the COVID-19 pandemic			
2021	(United Kingdom) Natasha McKay	(Bulgaria) Alexandra Feigin	(Czech Republic) Eliška Březinová	
2022	(Austria) Olga Mikutina	(Czech Republic) Eliška Březinová	(United Kingdom) Natasha McKay	
2023	(Lithuania) Aleksandra Golovkina	(Poland) Karolina Białas	(United Kingdom) Genevieve Somerville	
2024	(Israel) Mariia Seniuk	(United States) Brooke Gewalt	(France) Clémence Mayindu	
2025	(United States) Alina Bonillo	(United States) Alexa Gasparotto	(United Kingdom) Nina Povey	
2026	(Austria); Olga Mikutina	(Poland); Ekaterina Kurakova	(Canada); Marie-Maude Pomerleau	

=== Pairs ===
Pairs event medalists
Year	Gold	Silver	Bronze	Ref.
2019	No pairs competitors			
2020	Competition cancelled due to the COVID-19 pandemic			
2021	(United Kingdom); Anastasia Vaipan-Law; Luke Digby	(Spain); Dorota Broda; Pedro Betegón	(Italy); Anna Valesi; Manuel Piazza	
2022	(Italy); Sara Conti; Niccolò Macii	(United Kingdom); Anastasia Vaipan-Law; Luke Digby	(Italy); Anna Valesi; Manuel Piazza	
2023	(Italy); Sara Conti; Niccolò Macii	(United Kingdom); Anastasia Vaipan-Law; Luke Digby	(Finland); Milania Väänänen; Filippo Clerici	
2024	(Italy); Sara Conti; Niccolò Macii	(United Kingdom); Anastasia Vaipan-Law; Luke Digby	(United States); Naomi Williams; Lachlan Lewer	
2025	(Italy); Sara Conti; Niccolò Macii	(Czech Republic); Anna Valesi; Martin Bidař	(United States); Chelsea Liu; Ryan Bedard	
2026	(Canada); Ava Kemp; Yohnatan Elizarov	(France); Camille Kovalev; Pavel Kovalev	(Czech Republic); Anna Valesi; Martin Bidar	

== Junior medalists ==
=== Men's singles ===
Junior men's event medalists
Year	Gold	Silver	Bronze	Ref.
2019	(Sweden) Casper Johansson	(United Kingdom) Edward Appleby	(United Kingdom) Connor Bray	
2020	Competition cancelled due to the COVID-19 pandemic			
2021	(United Kingdom) Joseph Alexander Zakipour	(Republic of Ireland) Dillon Judge	No other competitors	
2022	(United Kingdom) Arin Yorke	(United Kingdom) Tao MacRae	(United Kingdom) Sidney Dennis Williamson	
2023	(United Kingdom) Arin Yorke	(United Kingdom) Lloyd Thomson	(United Kingdom) Lucas Fitterer	
2024	(United Kingdom) Lloyd Thomson	(United States) Zachary Lopinto	(United States) Kirk Haugeto	
2025	(United States) Lorenzo Elano	(United Kingdom) Lloyd Thomson	(United Kingdom) Edward Solovyov	
2026	(Canada); Rui Qin	(United States); Joshua Snyder	(Canada); Bowen Yan	

=== Women's singles ===
Junior women's event medalists
Year	Gold	Silver	Bronze	Ref.
2019	(Sweden) Emelie Ling	(United Kingdom) Jasmine Cressey	(United Kingdom) Amy Morris	
2020	Competition cancelled due to the COVID-19 pandemic			
2021	(Bulgaria) Chiara Hristova	(Bulgaria) Maria Manova	(Czech Republic) Adela Vallova	
2022	(Czech Republic) Michaela Vrašťáková	(Czech Republic) Adela Vallova	(Italy) Anna Bodrone	
2023	(United States) Cleo Park	(Chinese Taipei) Sadie Weng	(Italy) Rina Taniguchi	
2024	(United States) Sofia Bezkorovainaya	(United States) Jiaying Ellyse Johnson	(Czech Republic) Barbora Tykalová	
2025	(Czech Republic) Katerina Hanusova	(Switzerland) Sayra Bessire	(France) Audrey Montiel	
2026	(United States); Mia Smith	(United States); Kaya Tiernan	(Italy); Noemi Joos	

=== Pairs ===
Junior pairs event medalists
Year	Gold	Silver	Bronze	Ref.
2019–21	No junior pairs competitors prior to 2022			
2022	(United Kingdom); Lucy Hay; Kyle McLeod	(United Kingdom); Charlotte Hodgkinson; Elliot Appleby	No other competitors	
2023	(United Kingdom); Lucy Hay; Kyle McLeod	(Czech Republic); Debora Anna Cohen; Lukáš Vochozka	(Israel); Sofia Enkina; Nikita Kovalenko	
2024	(United States); Saya Carpenter; Ignacio Maravilla	(United States); Addyson McDanold; Aaron Felberbaum	(France); Romane Télémaque; Lucas Coulon	
2025	(United States); Addyson McDanold; Aaron Felberbaum	(France); Romane Télémaque; Lucas Coulon	(United States); Alena Kerr; Sam Herbert	
2026	(United States); Elizabeth Yun; Mitchell Castelletti	(Canada); Amy Ritchie; Mitchell Dunn	(United States); Juliet Meek; Devin Meek	
