= 2024 CS Golden Spin of Zagreb =

Figure skating competition

- Type: ISU Challenger Series
- Date: December 4 – 7
- Season: 2024–25
- Location: Zagreb, Croatia
- Host: Croatian Skating Federation
- Venue: Klizalište Velesajem

Champions
- Men's singles: (Estonia) Mihhail Selevko
- Women's singles: (United States) Alysa Liu
- Pairs: (Poland) Ioulia Chtchetinina; and Michał Woźniak
- Ice dance: (United Kingdom) Phebe Bekker; and James Hernandez
- Previous: 2023 CS Golden Spin of Zagreb
- Next: 2025 CS Golden Spin of Zagreb
- Previous CS: 2024 CS Warsaw Cup

The 2024 CS Golden Spin of Zagreb was held on December 4–7, 2024, in Zagreb, Croatia. It was part of the 2024–25 ISU Challenger Series. Medals were awarded in men's singles, women's singles, pairs, and ice dance.

== Entries ==
The International Skating Union published the list of entries on November 13, 2024.

Country	Men	Women	Pairs	Ice dance
Austria	Maurizio Zandron	Stefanie Pesendorfer	Gabriella Izzo; Luc Maierhofer	—N/a
Austria	—N/a		Sophia Schaller; Livio Mayr	—N/a
Azerbaijan	—N/a	Nargiz Süleymanova	—N/a	
Belgium	—N/a	Nina Pinzarrone	—N/a	
Brazil	—N/a			Natalia Pallu-Neves; Jayin Panesar
Chinese Taipei	Yu-Hsiang Li	—N/a		
Croatia	—N/a	Hana Cvijanović	—N/a	
Cyprus	—N/a			Angelina Kudryavtseva; Ilia Karankevich
Ecuador	—N/a			Gabriela Palomeque; Tanner White
Estonia	Arlet Levandi	Eva-Lotta Kiibus	—N/a	
Estonia	Aleksandr Selevko	Nataly Langerbaur	—N/a	
Estonia	Mihhail Selevko	Kristina Lisovskaja	—N/a	
Finland	Makar Suntsev	Selma Välitalo	Milania Väänänen; Filippo Clerici	—N/a
France	François Pitot	Maïa Mazzara	Tilda Alteryd; Noël-Antoine Pierre	Lou Terreaux; Noé Perron
France	—N/a	Léa Serna	Aurélie Faula; Théo Belle	—N/a
France	—N/a	—N/a	Camille Kovalev; Pavel Kovalev	—N/a
Georgia	Nika Egadze	—N/a		Diana Davis; Gleb Smolkin
Germany	—N/a		Letizia Roscher; Luis Schuster	Jennifer Janse van Rensburg; Benjamin Steffan
Germany	—N/a		—N/a	Charise Matthaei; Max Liebers
Great Britain	Freddie Leggott	—N/a	—N/a	Phebe Bekker; James Hernandez
Israel	Mark Gorodnitsky	Mariia Seniuk	—N/a	Shira Ichilov; Dmytriy Kravchenko
Israel	Lev Vinokur	—N/a	—N/a	Elizabeth Tkachenko; Alexei Kiliakov
Italy	Matteo Nalbone	Elena Agostinelli	—N/a	
Italy	—N/a	Carlotta Maria Gardini	—N/a	
Kazakhstan	Rakhat Bralin	—N/a		
Lithuania	—N/a	Jogailė Aglinskytė	—N/a	
Mexico	—N/a			Harlow Lynella Stanley; Seiji Urano
Monaco	Davide Lewton Brain	—N/a		
Netherlands	—N/a	Niki Wories	—N/a	
Poland	Vladimir Samoilov	—N/a	Ioulia Chtchetinina; Michał Woźniak	—N/a
Slovenia	David Sedej	Julija Lovrencic	—N/a	
South Korea	—N/a	Kim Seo-young	—N/a	
Spain	—N/a		Brooke McIntosh; Marco Zandron	—N/a
Sweden	—N/a		Greta Crafoord; John Crafoord	—N/a
Switzerland	—N/a	Livia Kaiser	—N/a	
Ukraine	Vadym Novikov	Yelizaveta Babenko	—N/a	Zoe Larson; Andrii Kapran
Ukraine	—N/a	Tetiana Firsova	—N/a	—N/a
Ukraine	—N/a	Taisiia Spesivtseva	—N/a	—N/a
United States	Tomoki Hiwatashi	Alysa Liu	Emily Chan; Spencer Akira Howe	Leah Neset; Artem Markelov
United States	—N/a	Bradie Tennell	Audrey Shin; Balázs Nagy	—N/a

=== Changes to preliminary assignments ===
Date	Discipline	Withdrew	Added	Ref.
November 22	Men	(United States); Jason Brown	—N/a	
November 23	Pairs	(United States); Isabelle Martins; Ryan Bedard	—N/a	
November 24	Women	(United States); Amber Glenn	—N/a	
November 27	Men	(Azerbaijan); Vladimir Litvintsev	(Italy); Matteo Nalbone	
November 27	Men	(Croatia); Jari Kessler	(Monaco); Davide Lewton Brain	
November 27	Men	(France); Ilia Gogitidze	—N/a	
November 27	Men	(France); Corentin Spinar	—N/a	
November 27	Men	(Italy); Daniel Grassl	—N/a	
November 27	Women	(Israel); Elizabet Gervits	(Austria); Stefanie Pesendorfer	
November 27	Women	(Israel); Viktoriia Iushchenkova	(Italy); Carlotta Maria Gardini	
November 27	Women	(Italy); Sarina Joos	(Ukraine); Taisiia Spesivtseva	
November 27	Women	(Italy); Chiara Minighini	—N/a	
November 27	Women	(Kazakhstan); Anna Levkovets	—N/a	
November 27	Women	(Romania); Julia Sauter	—N/a	
November 27	Women	(Sweden); Josefin Taljegård	—N/a	
November 27	Women	(Ukraine); Anastasia Gozhva	—N/a	
November 27	Pairs	(Australia); Anastasia Golubeva; Hektor Giotopoulos Moore	—N/a	
November 27	Pairs	(Italy); Lucrezia Beccari; Matteo Guarise	—N/a	
November 27	Pairs	(Italy); Sara Conti; Niccolò Macii	—N/a	
November 27	Pairs	(Italy); Rebecca Ghilardi; Filippo Ambrosini	—N/a	
November 27	Pairs	(Philippines); Isabella Gamez; Aleksandr Korovin	—N/a	
November 27	Ice dance	(France); Alisa Ovsiankina; Maximilien Rahier	—N/a	
November 27	Ice dance	(Germany); Karla Maria Karl; Kai Hoferichter	—N/a	
November 30	Men	(Sweden); Gabriel Folkesson	—N/a	
December 3	Women	(Belgium); Loena Hendrickx	—N/a	
December 3	Men	(United States); Camden Pulkinen	—N/a	
December 4	Men	(Germany); Kai Jagoda	—N/a	
December 4	Men	(Italy); Nikolaj Memola	—N/a	
December 4	Men	(Italy); Matteo Rizzo	—N/a	
December 4	Men	(Switzerland); Noah Bodenstein	—N/a	
December 4	Men	(Switzerland); Lukas Britschgi	—N/a	
December 4	Women	(France); Maé-Bérénice Méité	—N/a	
December 4	Women	(United Kingdom); Kristen Spours	—N/a	
December 4	Women	(Serbia); Antonina Dubinina	—N/a	
December 4	Women	(Switzerland); Sara Franzi	—N/a	
December 4	Women	(Switzerland); Kimmy Repond	—N/a	
December 4	Pairs	(Switzerland); Oxana Vouillamoz; Tom Bouvart	—N/a	
December 4	Ice dance	(Israel); Mariia Nosovitskaya; Mikhail Nosovitskiy	—N/a	

== Results ==
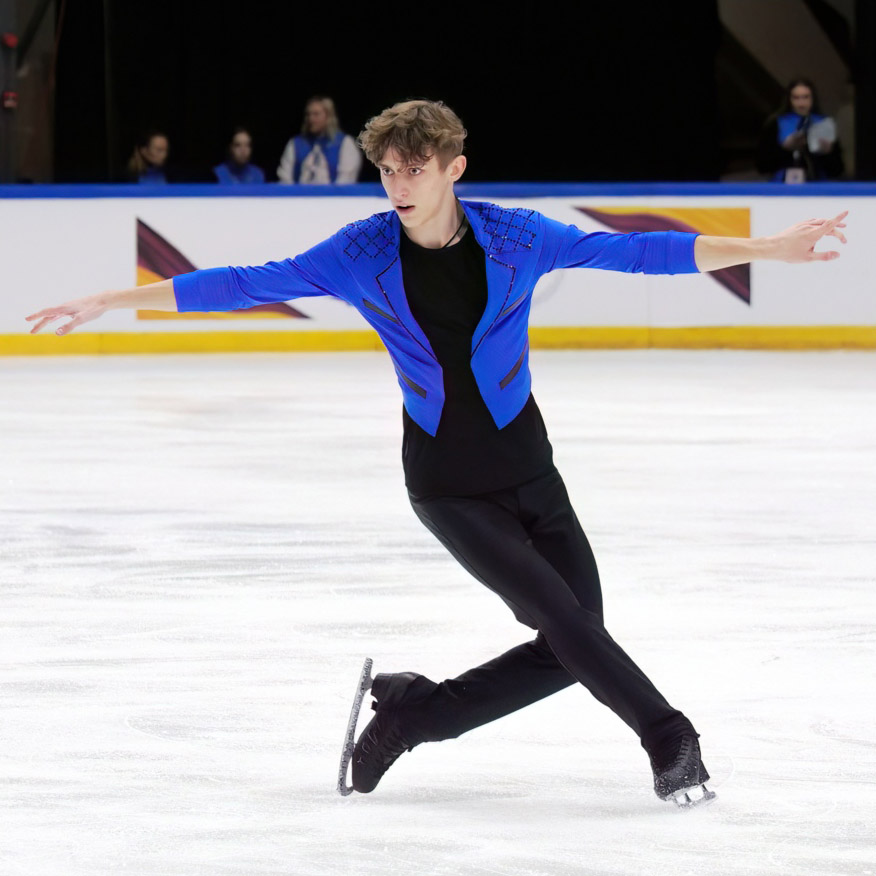
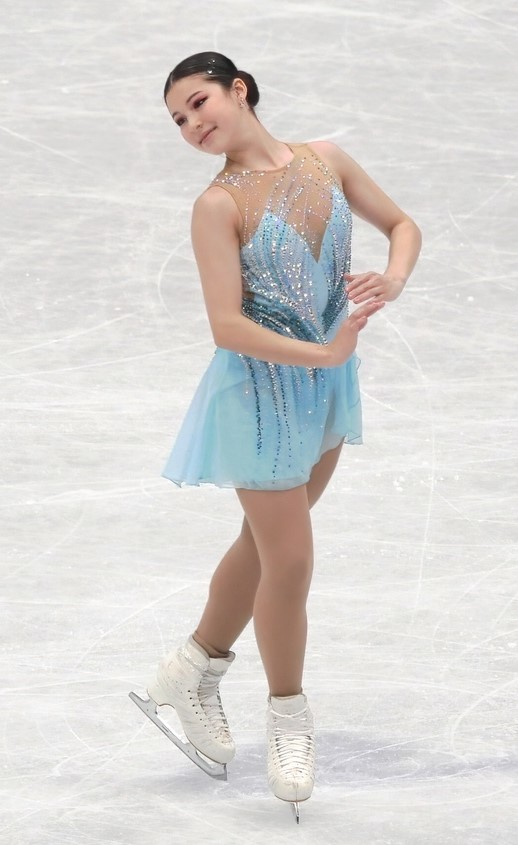
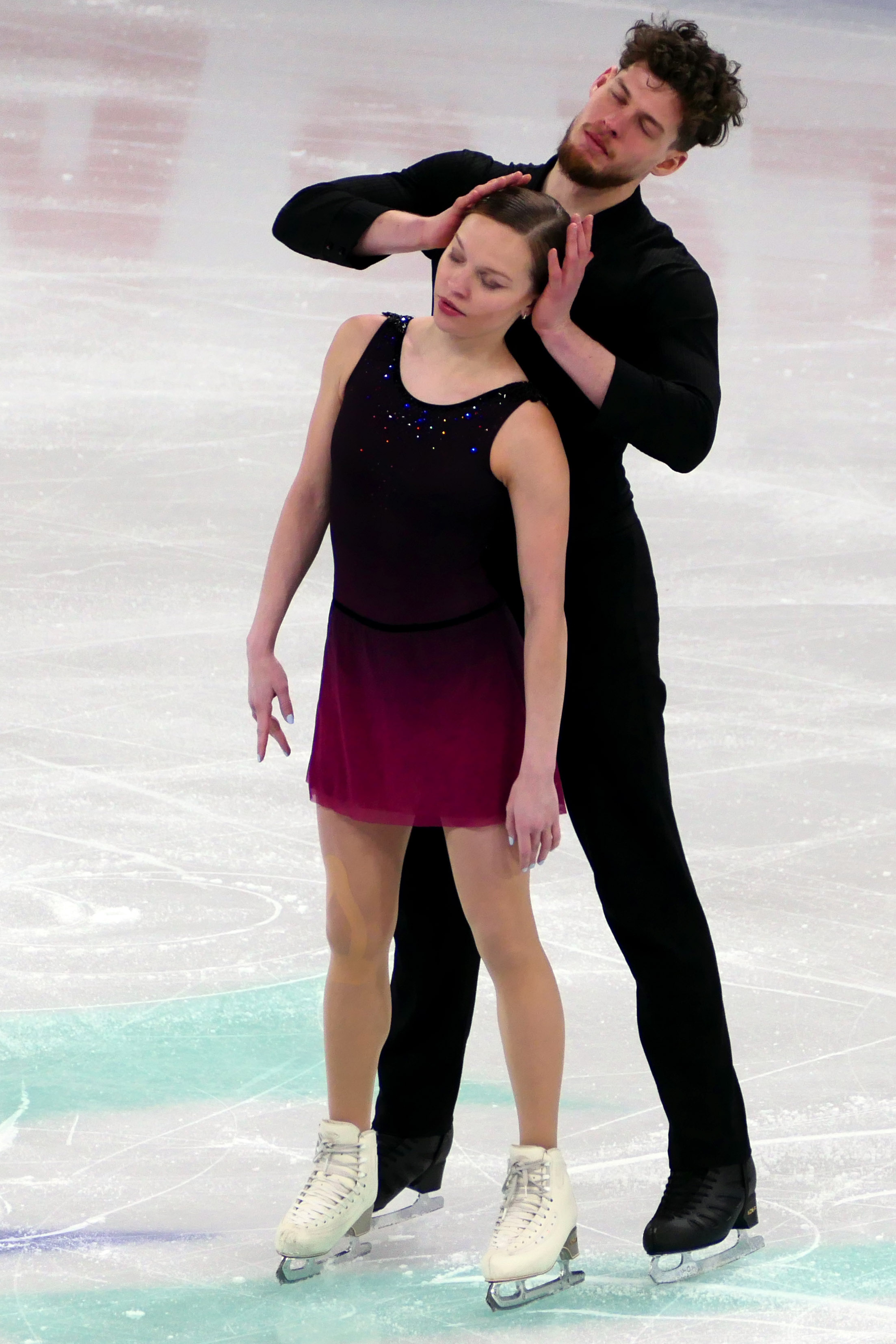
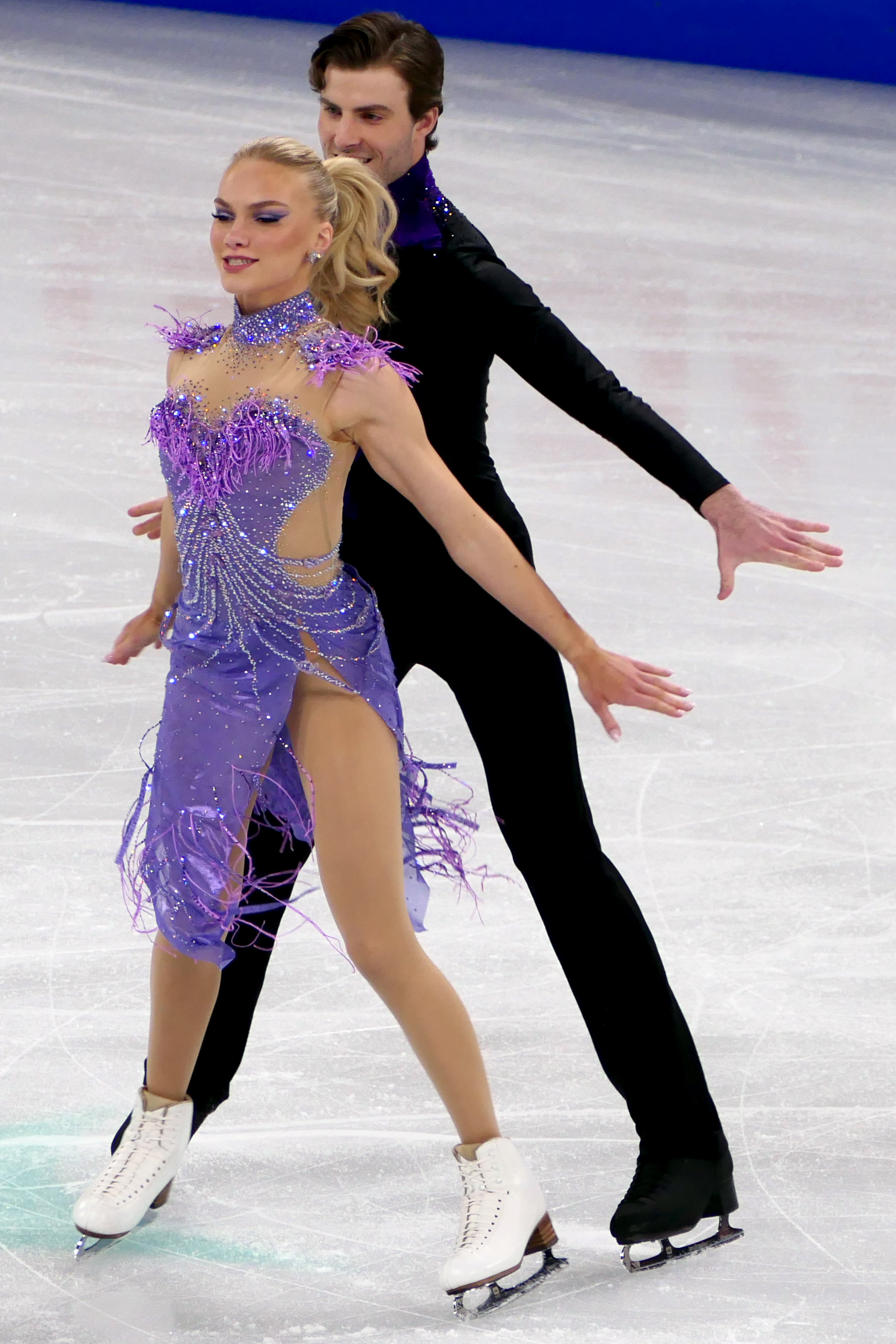
The 2024 Golden Spin of Zagreb champions: Mihhail Selevko of Estonia (men's singles); Alysa Liu of the United States (women's singles); Ioulia Chtchetinina and Michał Woźniak of Poland (pair skating); and Phebe Bekker and James Hernandez of Great Britain (ice dance)

=== Men's singles ===
Men's results
Rank	Skater	Nation	Total points	SP		FS	
1st place, gold medalist(s)	Mihhail Selevko	Estonia	245.06	1	86.20	1	158.86
2nd place, silver medalist(s)	Aleksandr Selevko	Estonia	234.56	2	83.39	3	151.17
3rd place, bronze medalist(s)	François Pitot	France	229.44	6	73.72	2	155.72
4	Nika Egadze	Georgia	217.01	5	75.18	4	141.83
5	Arlet Levandi	Estonia	213.79	4	75.71	5	138.08
6	Vladimir Samoilov	Poland	207.75	3	75.99	7	131.76
7	Mark Gorodnitsky	Israel	199.86	7	72.55	10	127.31
8	Lev Vinokur	Israel	199.83	10	69.04	8	130.79
9	Maurizio Zandron	Austria	198.83	9	70.32	9	128.51
10	Yu-Hsiang Li	Chinese Taipei	198.36	12	64.11	6	134.25
11	Tomoki Hiwatashi	United States	192.86	8	71.66	11	121.20
12	Davide Lewton Brain	Monaco	179.58	11	68.27	12	111.31
13	Matteo Nalbone	Italy	169.68	13	63.58	15	106.10
14	Vadym Novikov	Ukraine	166.95	16	59.55	14	107.40
15	David Sedej	Slovenia	162.37	15	60.74	16	101.63
16	Freddie Leggott	Great Britain	156.81	18	48.64	13	108.17
17	Makar Suntsev	Finland	155.15	14	61.24	18	93.91
18	Rakhat Bralin	Kazakhstan	147.10	17	48.79	17	98.31

=== Women's singles ===
Women's results
Rank	Skater	Nation	Total points	SP		FS	
1st place, gold medalist(s)	Alysa Liu	United States	197.71	2	68.06	1	129.65
2nd place, silver medalist(s)	Nina Pinzarrone	Belgium	193.49	3	65.20	2	128.29
3rd place, bronze medalist(s)	Bradie Tennell	United States	191.10	1	68.32	3	122.78
4	Léa Serna	France	181.55	4	64.81	4	116.74
5	Kim Seo-young	South Korea	171.95	6	58.73	6	113.22
6	Mariia Seniuk	Israel	168.30	5	59.08	8	109.22
7	Livia Kaiser	Switzerland	161.30	15	45.35	5	115.95
8	Niki Wories	Netherlands	159.65	10	50.01	7	109.64
9	Stefanie Pesendorfer	Austria	153.20	7	56.53	13	96.67
10	Eva-Lotta Kiibus	Estonia	150.02	11	49.50	10	100.52
11	Carlotta Maria Gardini	Italy	149.97	8	53.14	12	96.83
12	Jogailė Aglinskytė	Lithuania	147.51	17	43.02	9	104.49
13	Elena Agostinelli	Italy	147.10	12	48.35	11	98.75
14	Nataly Langerbaur	Estonia	145.39	9	50.58	15	94.81
15	Selma Välitalo	Finland	142.46	14	45.83	14	96.63
16	Nargiz Süleymanova	Azerbaijan	137.40	16	44.34	17	93.06
17	Julija Lovrencic	Slovenia	133.21	20	40.86	18	92.35
18	Taisiia Spesivtseva	Ukraine	131.19	18	42.55	19	88.64
19	Kristina Lisovskaja	Estonia	130.30	21	36.58	16	93.72
20	Yelizaveta Babenko	Ukraine	130.07	13	46.62	20	83.45
21	Maïa Mazzara	France	118.83	19	41.53	22	77.30
22	Tetiana Firsova	Ukraine	115.48	23	35.32	21	80.16
23	Hana Cvijanović	Croatia	108.31	22	36.32	23	71.99

=== Pairs ===
Ice dance results
Rank	Team	Nation	Total points	SP		FS	
1st place, gold medalist(s)	Ioulia Chtchetinina; Michał Woźniak	Poland	185.50	2	62.76	1	122.74
2nd place, silver medalist(s)	Emily Chan; Spencer Akira Howe	United States	177.70	1	65.13	2	112.57
3rd place, bronze medalist(s)	Audrey Shin; Balázs Nagy	United States	170.21	3	58.22	3	111.99
4	Letizia Roscher; Luis Schuster	Germany	162.69	6	53.75	4	108.94
5	Sophia Schaller; Livio Mayr	Austria	159.29	4	56.61	6	102.68
6	Camille Kovalev; Pavel Kovalev	France	158.45	5	54.52	5	103.93
7	Aurélie Faula; Théo Belle	France	154.69	8	52.83	7	101.86
8	Greta Crafoord; John Crafoord	Sweden	154.53	7	52.95	8	101.58
9	Gabriella Izzo; Luc Maierhofer	Austria	150.60	9	51.68	9	98.92
10	Milania Väänänen; Filippo Clerici	Finland	144.51	10	49.69	10	94.82
11	Brooke McIntosh; Marco Zandron	Spain	128.17	11	49.40	11	78.77
12	Tilda Alteryd; Noël-Antoine Pierre	France	118.67	12	41.87	12	76.80

=== Ice dance ===
Ice dance results
Rank	Team	Nation	Total points	RD		FD	
1st place, gold medalist(s)	Phebe Bekker; James Hernandez	Great Britain	182.73	1	72.36	1	110.37
2nd place, silver medalist(s)	Diana Davis; Gleb Smolkin	Georgia	178.59	3	70.62	2	107.97
3rd place, bronze medalist(s)	Jennifer Janse van Rensburg; Benjamin Steffan	Germany	178.11	2	72.21	3	105.90
4	Leah Neset; Artem Markelov	United States	171.63	4	70.19	4	101.44
5	Charise Matthaei; Max Liebers	Germany	163.65	5	65.59	5	98.06
6	Elizabeth Tkachenko; Alexei Kiliakov	Israel	162.17	7	64.35	6	97.82
7	Zoe Larson; Andrii Kapran	Ukraine	161.32	6	65.20	7	96.12
8	Angelina Kudryavtseva; Ilia Karankevich	Cyprus	155.05	8	61.69	8	93.36
9	Natalia Pallu-Neves; Jayin Panesar	Brazil	146.81	9	58.50	9	88.31
10	Shira Ichilov; Dmytriy Kravchenko	Israel	145.15	10	58.45	10	86.70
11	Harlow Lynella Stanley; Seiji Urano	Mexico	122.91	12	46.68	11	76.23
12	Gabriela Palomeque; Tanner White	Ecuador	93.77	13	33.70	12	60.07
WD	Lou Terreaux; Noé Perron	France	withdrew	11	58.13	withdrew from competition	
