= Maurizio Zandron =

Italian figure skater (born 1992)

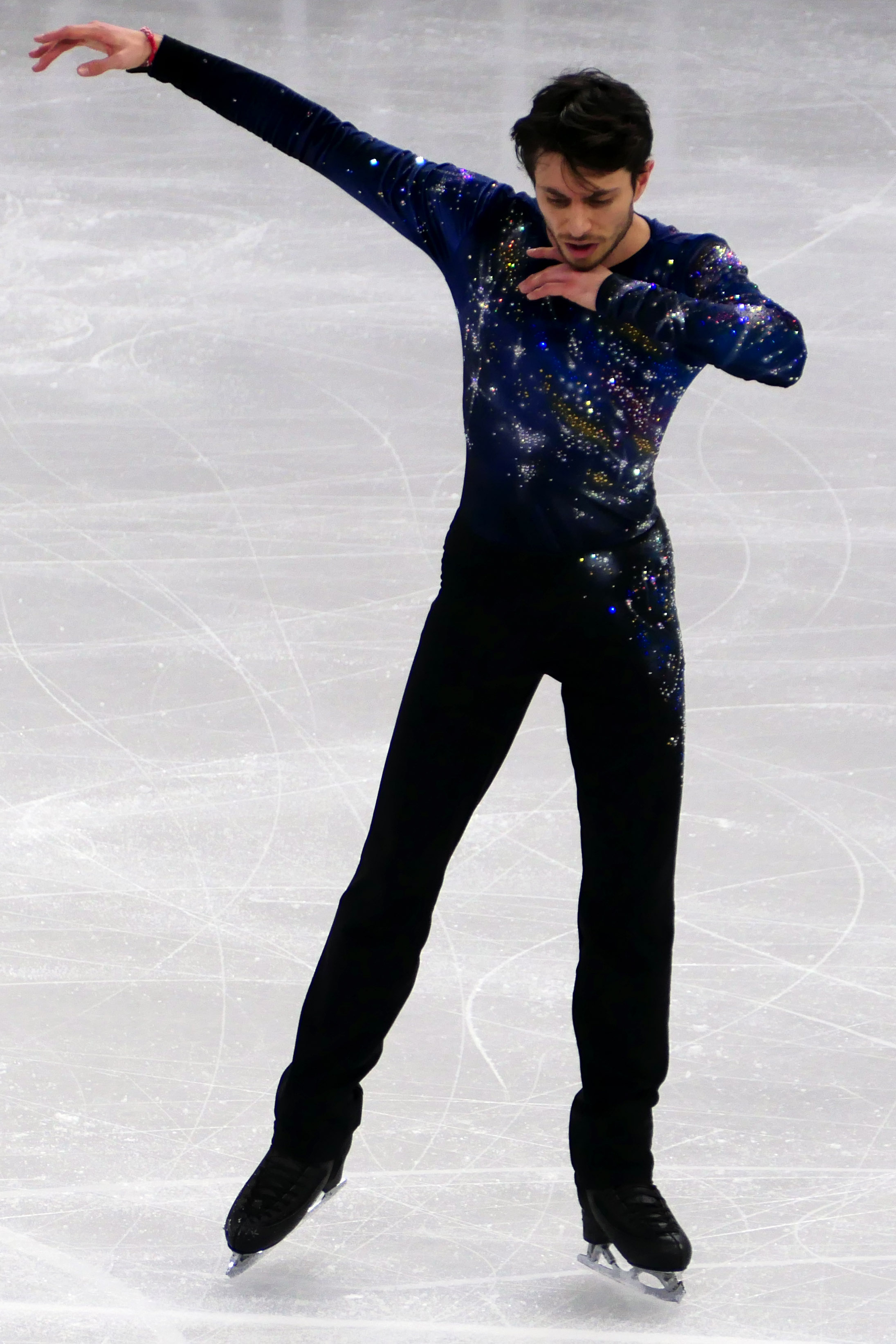
- Maurizio Zandron at the 2024 World Championships

Personal information
- Born: 15 November 1992 (age 33) Bolzano, Italy
- Home town: Innsbruck, Austria
- Height: 1.80 m (5 ft 11 in)

Figure skating career
- Country: Austria (since 2018); Italy (2005–18)
- Discipline: Men's singles
- Coach: Gabriele Minchio; Claudia Houdek
- Skating club: Union Eislaufschule Innsbruck
- Began skating: 2000
- Retired: March 29, 2026

Medal record
Representing Austria
Austrian Championships
Gold medal – first place	2019 Gmunden	Singles
Gold medal – first place	2020 Klagenfurt	Singles
Gold medal – first place	2021 Linz	Singles
Gold medal – first place	2023 St. Pölten	Singles
Gold medal – first place	2024 Feldkirch	Singles
Gold medal – first place	2025 Dornbirn	Singles
Gold medal – first place	2026 Innsbruck	Singles
Silver medal – second place	2022 Graz	Singles
Representing Italy
Italian Championships
Bronze medal – third place	2013 Milan	Singles
Bronze medal – third place	2016 Turin	Singles
Bronze medal – third place	2017 Egna	Singles
Bronze medal – third place	2018 Milan	Singles

Maurizio Zandron (born 15 November 1992) is an Italian-born retired figure skater who competed for Austria; he previously represented Italy until 2018. He is the winner of several medals in international competition, including gold at the 2016 Denkova-Staviski Cup, 2018 Bavarian Open, and 2018 Sofia Trophy. Additionally, Zandron is a seven-time Austrian national champion (2019–21, 2023–26).

== Personal life ==
Maurizio Zandron was born on 15 November 1992 in Bolzano, Italy. He has an economics degree from Università Cattolica del Sacro Cuore in Milan. Owing to his maternal great-grandmother's roots, he obtained Austrian citizenship in July 2018. His brother, Marco, competes in pair skating for Spain.

== Career ==
=== Early years ===
Zandron began learning to skate in 2000. His early coaches included Melita Dona and Gabriele Minchio. His ISU Junior Grand Prix debut came in 2007. He made his first senior international appearance in early April 2010 at the Triglav Trophy. By the 2010–2011 season, he was training under Viktoria Andreeva in Bolzano and Merano.

=== 2011–16 ===
Cristina Mauri became Zandron's coach in the 2011–2012 season. He represented Italy at the 2012 World Junior Championships in Minsk, Belarus; he qualified to the final segment and finished 20th overall.

His first senior international medal, silver, came at the Denkova-Staviski Cup in December 2012. Italy initially selected him to compete at the 2013 European Championships but then decided to name Paolo Bacchini.

Zandron took bronze at the 2013 Crystal Skate of Romania, bronze at the 2015 Triglav Trophy, silver at the 2016 Cup of Tyrol, and silver at the 2016 Triglav Trophy.

=== 2016–17 season: European Championships debut ===
Zandron trained in Italy with Mauri and also spent time in Barrie, Ontario, Canada, where he was coached by Doug Leigh. He won his first senior international title at the Denkova-Staviski Cup in October 2016 and followed up with silver at the Merano Cup. Italy assigned him to compete at the 2017 European Championships in Ostrava, Czech Republic. Ranked 18th in the short program, he advanced to the free skate and would finish 19th overall.

=== 2017–18 season ===
Zandron won silver at the Volvo Open Cup, silver at the Santa Claus Cup, gold at the Bavarian Open, and gold at the Sofia Trophy. He also won his fourth national bronze medal.

=== 2018–19 season: Switch to Austria; first Austrian national title ===
Zandron received an invitation to his first Grand Prix event, the 2018 Rostelecom Cup, but had to decline due to his decision to change countries. In July 2018, an Italian newspaper reported that he would represent Austria and that, as a result, he was not allowed to compete until 12 February 2019. He planned to continue training in Milan with Cristina Mauri and to also train in Innsbruck under Claudia Houdek.

=== 2019–20 season ===
Zandron was assigned to make his World Championship debut in Montreal, but the 2020 World Championships were cancelled as a result of the coronavirus pandemic.

=== 2020–21 season: World Championships debut ===
With the initial assignments for the new season limited by pandemic-related travel restrictions, Zandron attended the 2020 CS Nebelhorn Trophy with other skaters training in Europe. He placed fourth. He went on to place fifth at the 2020 CS Budapest Trophy, and fourth at the Tallink Hotels Cup. Assigned to the 2021 World Championships in Stockholm, he placed twenty-ninth.

=== 2021–22 season ===
Zandron began the season at the 2021 CS Lombardia Trophy, where he placed thirteenth. He placed fourteenth at the 2021 CS Nebelhorn Trophy, insufficient to earn a place for Austria at the 2022 Winter Olympics. He went on to place sixth at the Cup of Nice and fifth at the 2021 CS Cup of Austria.

After winning silver at the Austrian championships, he was seventeenth at the 2022 European Championships and seventeenth as well at the 2022 World Championships.

=== 2022–23 season: Grand Prix debut ===
Zandron started the season by winning gold at the 2022 Tayside Trophy and at the 2022 Crystal Skate. He followed this up with a ninth-place finish at the 2022 CS Ice Challenge. Invited to make his Grand Prix debut at the 2022 NHK Trophy, he finished eleventh of twelve skaters.

After winning his fourth national title at the 2023 Austrian Championships, Zandron finished eleventh at the 2023 European Championships. He then finished seventh at the 2023 International Challenge Cup.

He subsequently closed the season by finishing twenty-fourth at the 2023 World Championships.

=== 2023–24 season ===
Zandron began the season by winning gold at the 2023 Tayside Trophy and at the 2023 Denkova-Staviski Cup. He subsequently competed on the 2023–24 ISU Challenger Series, finishing fifth at the 2023 CS Warsaw Cup and fourth at the 2023 CS Golden Spin of Zagreb.

After winning Austrian Championships for a fifth time, Zandron finished seventeenth at the 2024 European Championships and fourth at the 2024 Merano Ice Trophy. He then closed the season with a twenty-seventh-place finish at the 2024 World Championships.

=== 2024–25 season ===
Zandron opened the season by winning gold at the 2024 Tayside Trophy and silver at the 2024 Denkova-Staviski Cup. He then competed on the 2024–25 ISU Challenger Series, placing seventh at the 2024 CS Warsaw Cup and ninth at the 2024 CS Golden Spin of Zagreb.

In December, Zandron won his sixth national title at the 2025 Austrian Championships. The following month, he finished twenty-sixth at the 2025 European Championships. He followed this up by placing eighth at the 2025 Merano Ice Trophy and winning bronze at the 2025 Bellu Memorial.

He subsequently finished the season with a thirty-fifth-place finish at the 2025 World Championships.

=== 2025–26 season ===
Zandron started his season in late August by winning gold at the 2025 Robin Cousins Cup. He followed up this result by finishing fifteenth at the ISU Skate to Milano before subsequently winning silver at the 2025 Tayside Trophy, placing fifth at the 2025 Ice Challenge, and winning silver at the 2025 Cup of Innsbruck.

In December, Zandron won his seventh national title at the 2026 Astrian Championships. The following month, he finished seventeenth at the 2026 European Championships in Sheffield, England, United Kingdom.

In March, Zandron competed at the 2026 World Championships. He set a season's best score of 67.82 points in the short program and placed thirtieth. He did not advance to the free skate.

== Programs ==
Season	Short program	Free skating
2025–26	Earth Song by Michael Jackson choreo. by Raffaella Cazzaniga	Adagio for Strings by David Zinman & Orchestra Sinfonica di Baltimora choreo. by Raffaella Cazzaniga, Prisca Picano
2024–25	Earth Song by Michael Jackson choreo. by Raffaella Cazzaniga	Adagio for Strings by David Zinman & Orchestra Sinfonica di Baltimora choreo. by Raffaella Cazzaniga, Prisca Picano
2023–24	L’ultima notte di Amore by Santi Pulvirenti & Lorenzo De Benedictis choreo. by Raffaella Cazzaniga, Prisca Picano	Adagio for Strings by David Zinman & Orchestra Sinfonica di Baltimora choreo. by Raffaella Cazzaniga, Prisca Picano
2022–23	Earth Song by Michael Jackson choreo. by Raffaella Cazzaniga	Adagio for Strings by David Zinman & Orchestra Sinfonica di Baltimora choreo. by Raffaella Cazzaniga, Prisca Picano
2021–22	Earth Song by Michael Jackson choreo. by Raffaella Cazzaniga	Alice in Wonderland by Danny Elfman choreo. by Raffaela Cazaniga, Corrado Giornadi, Massimo Scali
2020–21	Earth Song by Michael Jackson choreo. by Raffaella Cazzaniga	Alice in Wonderland by Danny Elfman choreo. by Raffaela Cazaniga, Corrado Giornadi, Massimo Scali
2019–20	That's Life by Dean Kay, Kelly Gordon performed by Shawn James; In the Swing performed by the Imperial Swing Orchestra choreo. by Raffaela Cazaniga, Corrado Giornadi, Massimo Scali	Alice in Wonderland by Danny Elfman choreo. by Raffaela Cazaniga, Corrado Giornadi, Massimo Scali
2016–17	The Feeling Begins by Peter Gabriel; Best of Belly Beats by Istanbul Grooves choreo. by Raffaela Cazaniga, David Islam, Antoaneta Alexieva	The Artist by Ludovic Bource choreo. by Raffaela Cazaniga, David Islam, Antoaneta Alexieva
2011–12	Tron: Legacy by Daft Punk choreo. by Andrea Vaturi, Antoaneta Plamenova	Cirque du Soleil; Incantation; Carrousel choreo. by Andrea Vaturi, Antoaneta Plamenova
2010–11	Belly Dance; Hibi Haba by Edvin Marton choreo. by Andrea Vaturi, Antoaneta Plamenova	Cirque du Soleil; Incantation; Carrousel choreo. by Andrea Vaturi, Antoaneta Plamenova

== Competitive highlights ==
=== Single skating (for Austria) ===
- GP – Event of the ISU Grand Prix Series
- JGP – Event of the ISU Junior Grand Prix Series
- CS – Event of the ISU Challenger Series
- TBD – Assigned
- WD – Withdrew from competition
- C – Event was cancelled

Competition placements at senior level
Season	2018–19	2019–20	2020–21	2021–22	2022–23	2023–24	2024–25	2025–26
World Championships		C	29th	17th	24th	27th	35th	30th
European Championships		28th		17th	11th	17th	26th	17th
Austrian Championships	1st	1st	1st	2nd	1st	1st	1st	1st
GP NHK Trophy					11th			
CS Budapest Trophy			5th					
CS Golden Spin of Zagreb						4th	9th	
CS Ice Challenge				5th	9th			
CS Lombardia Trophy		9th		13th				
CS Nebelhorn Trophy		10th	4th	14th				
CS Warsaw Cup						5th	7th	
Bavarian Open		6th						
Bellu Memorial				3rd			3rd	
Bosphorus Cup		3rd						
Challenge Cup	6th				7th			
Coupe du Printemps	3rd							
Cup of Innsbruck								2nd
Crystal Skate of Romania					1st			
Cup of Tyrol	2nd							
Denkova-Staviski Cup		1st				1st	2nd	
Egna Spring Trophy	4th							
Halloween Cup		4th						
Ice Challenge								5th
Maria Olszewska Memorial								3rd
Merano Ice Trophy						4th	8th	
Robin Cousins Cup								1st
Santa Claus Cup		2nd						
Skate Celje				1st				
Skate to Milano								15th
Skate Victoria	1st							
Sofia Trophy		3rd		1st				
Tallink Hotels Cup			4th					
Tayside Trophy				1st	1st	1st	1st	2nd
Trophée Métropole Nice				6th				
Volvo Open Cup		7th						5th

=== Single skating (for Italy) ===
Competition placements at senior level
Season	2009–10	2010–11	2011–12	2012–13	2013–14	2014–15	2015–16	2016–17	2017–18
European Championships								19th	
Italian Championships		7th	6th	3rd	4th		3rd	3rd	3rd
CS Golden Spin of Zagreb							16th		
CS Ice Star									8th
CS Lombardia Trophy					5th				13th
CS Tallinn Trophy							9th	5th	6th
Autumn Classic							5th		
Bavarian Open			8th	19th			4th		1st
Challenge Cup				10th					
Coupe du Printemps						6th			
Crystal Skate of Romania			10th	6th	3rd				
Cup of Tyrol							2nd	7th	
Denkova-Staviski Cup				2nd				1st	
Gardena Spring Trophy			4th	6th					
Hellmut Seibt Memorial						8th			
Mentor Toruń Cup						6th			
Merano Cup					4th		5th	2nd	
Santa Claus Cup									2nd
Sofia Trophy									1st
Triglav Trophy	10th		4th	6th		3rd	2nd		
Winter Universiade					26th	18th		13th	
Volvo Open Cup									2nd
Warsaw Cup				12th					

Competition placements at junior level
Season	2005–06	2006–07	2007–08	2008–09	2009–10	2010–11	2011–12
World Junior Championships							20th
Italian Championships	3rd	2nd	2nd		3rd		
JGP Austria							7th
JGP Croatia			22nd				
JGP Czech Republic						10th	
JGP Great Britain						17th	
JGP Italy				28th			8th
Cup of Nice							4th
Merano Cup			2nd		7th		
Mont Blanc Trophy						4th	
NRW Trophy					8th	11th	3rd

== Detailed results ==
ISU personal best scores in the +5/-5 GOE System
Segment	Type	Score	Event
Total	TSS	228.27	2022 World Championships
Short program	TSS	83.10	2022 World Championships
Short program	TES	44.02	2022 World Championships
Short program	PCS	39.08	2022 World Championships
Free skating	TSS	145.17	2022 World Championships
Free skating	TES	72.16	2023 CS Golden Spin of Zagreb
Free skating	PCS	76.00	2022 World Championships

ISU personal best scores in the +3/-3 GOE System
Segment	Type	Score	Event
Total	TSS	205.03	2017 CS Minsk-Arena Ice Star
Short program	TSS	74.19	2017 CS Minsk-Arena Ice Star
Short program	TES	40.44	2017 CS Minsk-Arena Ice Star
Short program	PCS	33.75	2017 CS Minsk-Arena Ice Star
Free skating	TSS	135.22	2016 CS Tallinn Trophy
Free skating	TES	68.20	2016 CS Tallinn Trophy
Free skating	PCS	70.00	2017 CS Minsk-Arena Ice Star

=== Single skating (for Austria) ===
Results in the 2023–24 season
Date	Event	SP		FS		Total	
Date	Event	P	Score	P	Score	P	Score
Oct 14–15, 2023	(United Kingdom) 2023 Tayside Trophy	1	75.87	1	140.41	1	216.28
Nov 7–12, 2023	(Bulgaria) 2023 Denkova-Staviski Cup	3	61.80	1	141.42	1	203.22
Nov 16–19, 2023	(Poland) 2023 CS Warsaw Cup	7	70.25	5	137.34	5	207.59
Dec 6–9, 2023	(Croatia) 2023 CS Golden Spin of Zagreb	7	64.63	4	139.59	4	204.22
Dec 13–17, 2023	(Austria) 2024 Austrian Championships	1	74.32	1	150.02	1	224.34
Jan 8–14, 2024	(Lithuania) 2024 European Championships	22	65.47	16	137.44	17	202.91
Feb 22–25, 2024	(Italy) 2024 Merano Ice Trophy	4	71.21	3	135.72	4	206.93
Mar 18–24, 2024	(Canada) 2024 World Championships	27	69.59	—N/a	—N/a	27	69.59

Results in the 2024–25 season
Date	Event	SP		FS		Total	
Date	Event	P	Score	P	Score	P	Score
Oct 12–13, 2024	(United Kingdom) 2024 Tayside Trophy	1	70.54	2	138.74	1	209.28
Nov 5-10, 2024	(Bulgaria) 2024 Denkova-Staviski Cup	3	70.61	2	146.47	2	217.08
Nov 20–24, 2024	(Poland) 2024 CS Warsaw Cup	7	65.88	6	135.73	7	201.61
Dec 4–7, 2024	(Croatia) 2024 CS Golden Spin of Zagreb	9	70.32	9	128.51	9	198.83
Dec 11–15, 2024	(Austria) 2025 Austrian Championships	1	61.67	1	136.36	1	198.03
Jan 28 – Feb 2, 2025	(Estonia) 2025 European Championships	26	63.79	—N/a	—N/a	26	63.79
Feb 18–23, 2025	(Romania) 2025 Bellu Memorial	2	77.22	3	127.66	3	204.88
Feb 13–16, 2025	(Italy) 2025 Merano Ice Trophy	8	64.78	9	120.42	8	185.20
Mar 25–30, 2025	(United States) 2025 World Championships	35	60.87	—N/a	—N/a	35	60.87

Results in the 2025–26 season
Date	Event	SP		FS		Total	
Date	Event	P	Score	P	Score	P	Score
August 21–22	(United Kingdom) 2025 Robin Cousins Cup	1	70.88	1	137.82	1	209.70
Sep 18–21, 2025	(China) 2025 ISU Skate to Milano	14	66.21	15	122.74	15	188.95
Oct 11–12, 2025	(United Kingdom) 2025 Tayside Trophy	1	73.09	3	127.17	2	200.26]
Nov 5–9, 2025	(Austria) 2025 Ice Challenge	5	68.96	5	124.45	5	193.41
Nov 13–16, 2025	(Austria) 2025 Cup of Innsbruck	2	72.19	2	126.99	2	199.18
Dec 10–13, 2025	(Austria) 2026 Austrian Championships	2	65.19	1	144.45	1	209.64
Jan 13–18, 2026	(United Kingdom) 2026 European Championships	19	67.68	17	128.57	17	196.25
Feb 24-28, 2026	(Poland) 2026 Maria Olszewska Memorial	3	74.69	3	131.87	3	206.56
Mar 24–29, 2026	(Czech Republic) 2026 World Championships	30	67.82	—N/a	—N/a	30	67.82
