= Eino Kettunen =

Finnish composer

Eino Kettunen (May 13, 1894 – August 15, 1964) was a Finnish composer and lyricist. He is the author of the well-known polka song Ievan polkka.

== Selected works ==
- Ilta Viipurissa (Sellanen on Viipuri), 1929 (Saukin uudistama nimellä Sellanen ol´ Viipuri)
- Villiruusu, 1929
- Ievan polkka, 1937
- Joensuun Elli, 1953

== Sources ==
- Elinaikoja
- Kauko Ratilainen ja Eila Ratilainen: Eino Kettusen ikkuna maailmaan. Sotkamo 1996.
- Kauko Ratilainen ja Eila Ratilainen: Eino Kettusen ikkuna maailmaan II.
