= Figure skating at the 2022 European Youth Olympic Winter Festival =

- Date: 20 – 25 March
- Season: 2021–22
- Location: Vuokatti, Finland
- Host: Finnish Figure Skating Association
- Venue: Vuokatti Arena

Champions
- Men's singles: (Estonia) Arlet Levandi
- Women's singles: (France) Lorine Schild
- Previous: 2019 European Youth Olympic Winter Festival
- Next: 2023 European Youth Olympic Winter Festival

Figure skating at the 2022 European Youth Olympic Winter Festival was held from 20 to 25 March 2022 at the Vuokatti Arena in Vuokatti, Finland. Medals were awarded in boys' and girls' singles. To be eligible, skaters must have been born between 1 July 2004 and 30 June 2006.

On 1 March 2022, the International Skating Union banned figure skaters and officials from Russia and Belarus from attending all international competitions due to the 2022 Russian invasion of Ukraine. On 2 March 2022, in accordance with a recommendation by the International Olympic Committee, the European Olympic Committees suspended the participation of Russia and Belarus from the 2022 European Youth Olympic Winter Festival.

== Schedule ==
Date	Discipline	Time	Segment
Wednesday, 23 March	Boys	13:15	Short program
Wednesday, 23 March	Girls	16:30	Short program
Thursday, 24 March	Boys	12:15	Free skating
Thursday, 24 March	Girls	15:45	Free skating
All times are listed in local time (UTC+02:00).

== Medal summary ==
=== Medalists ===
Event	Gold	Silver	Bronze
Boys	Arlet Levandi; Estonia	Raffaele Francesco Zich; Italy	Casper Johansson; Sweden
Girls	Lorine Schild; France	Olivia Lisko; Finland	Sarina Joos; Switzerland

=== Medals by country ===
Rank	Nation	Gold	Silver	Bronze	Total
1	Estonia	1	0	0	1
1	France	1	0	0	1
3	Finland	0	1	0	1
3	Italy	0	1	0	1
5	Sweden	0	0	1	1
5	Switzerland	0	0	1	1
Totals (6 entries)		2	2	2	6

== Entries ==
Eligible ISU member nations were required to confirm the number of their entries by fall 2021. Member nations and their respective Olympic committees began announcing entries in February 2022. The International Skating Union published a complete list of entries on 15 March 2022.

Country	Boys	Girls
Austria	Tobia Oellerer	Lisa Amaechi
Bosnia and Herzegovina		Zara Husedzinovic
Bulgaria	Aleksandar Kachamakov	Maria Manova
Czech Republic		Michaela Vrašťáková
Denmark		Catharina Victoria Petersen
Estonia	Arlet Levandi	Marianne Must
Finland	Arttu Juusola	Olivia Lisko
France	François Pitot	Lorine Schild
Georgia		Anna Dea Gulbiani-Schmidt
Germany	Arthur Mai	
Great Britain	Edward Appleby	Elena Komova
Greece		Despoina Katsarou
Hungary		Lili Krizsanovszki
Iceland		Júlía Rós Viðarsdóttir
Ireland		Elizabeth Golding
Israel	Lev Vinokur	Mariia Seniuk
Italy	Raffaele Francesco Zich	Ginevra Lavinia Negrello
Latvia	Daniels Kočkers	Anastasija Konga
Lithuania		Jogailė Aglinskytė
Luxembourg		Ysaline Hibon
Netherlands		Dani Loonstra
North Macedonia		Jana Kukovska
Norway		Mia Risa Gomez
Poland	Jakub Lofek	Karolina Białas
Romania		Luiza-Elena Ilie
Serbia		Darja Mijatović
Slovakia	Marko Piliar	Alexandra Michaela Filcová
Slovenia	David Sedej	Julija Lovrenčič
Spain		Celia Vandhana Garnacho
Sweden	Casper Johansson	Josefin Brovall
Switzerland	Noah Bodenstein	Sarina Joos
Turkey	Ali Efe Güneş	Anna Deniz Özdemir
Ukraine	Kyrylo Marsak	Taisiia Spesivtseva

=== Changes to preliminary entries ===
Date	Discipline	Withdrew	Added	Reason/Other notes	Refs
March 15	Girls	(Norway) Linnea Kilsand	(Norway) Mia Risa Gomez		

== Results ==
=== Boys ===
Rank	Name	Nation	Total points	SP		FS	
1	Arlet Levandi	Estonia	209.54	1	70.55	1	138.99
2	Raffaele Francesco Zich	Italy	187.83	2	69.08	3	118.75
3	Casper Johansson	Sweden	185.76	5	63.90	2	121.86
4	Edward Appleby	Great Britain	184.46	3	68.58	5	115.88
5	Lev Vinokur	Israel	177.40	6	61.49	4	115.91
6	François Pitot	France	174.98	4	65.92	6	109.06
7	Ali Efe Güneş	Turkey	156.37	8	52.40	8	103.97
8	Noah Bodenstein	Switzerland	155.61	15	48.92	7	106.69
9	Jakub Lofek	Poland	152.47	11	50.67	9	101.80
10	David Sedej	Slovenia	152.04	7	54.13	10	97.91
11	Arttu Juusola	Finland	144.21	13	49.55	11	94.66
12	Marko Piliar	Slovakia	137.67	9	51.17	12	86.50
13	Arthur Mai	Germany	134.57	12	50.65	14	83.92
14	Tobia Oellerer	Austria	133.67	14	49.32	13	84.35
15	Kyrylo Marsak	Ukraine	126.46	10	50.89	16	75.57
16	Daniels Kočkers	Latvia	125.11	16	43.11	15	82.00
17	Aleksandar Kachamakov	Bulgaria	79.67	17	28.27	17	51.40

=== Girls ===
Rank	Name	Nation	Total points	SP		FS	
1	Lorine Schild	France	166.98	2	57.88	1	109.10
2	Olivia Lisko	Finland	155.03	1	57.94	4	97.09
3	Sarina Joos	Switzerland	153.43	5	50.25	2	103.18
4	Ginevra Lavinia Negrello	Italy	150.92	4	50.38	3	100.54
5	Mariia Seniuk	Israel	140.84	3	52.53	7	88.31
6	Alexandra Michaela Filcová	Slovakia	133.54	11	45.15	6	88.39
7	Catharina Victoria Petersen	Denmark	132.24	10	47.76	9	84.48
8	Julija Lovrenčič	Slovenia	131.88	17	41.14	5	90.74
9	Jogailė Aglinskytė	Lithuania	131.71	8	49.19	11	82.52
10	Josefin Brovall	Sweden	131.23	7	49.78	13	81.45
11	Dani Loonstra	Netherlands	131.05	6	49.87	14	81.18
12	Karolina Białas	Poland	128.49	16	43.15	8	85.34
13	Anastasija Konga	Latvia	127.07	13	44.07	10	83.00
14	Mia Risa Gomez	Norway	124.71	9	48.60	18	76.11
15	Michaela Vrašťáková	Czech Republic	123.21	14	43.72	17	79.49
16	Maria Manova	Bulgaria	121.08	18	40.73	15	80.35
17	Marianne Must	Estonia	120.08	22	38.02	12	82.06
18	Elena Komova	Great Britain	118.02	12	44.25	21	73.77
19	Anna Deniz Özdemir	Turkey	118.00	23	37.69	16	80.31
20	Júlía Rós Viðarsdóttir	Iceland	115.22	19	40.53	20	74.69
21	Anna Dea Gulbiani-Schmidt	Georgia	112.68	24	37.41	19	75.27
22	Taisiia Spesivtseva	Ukraine	112.30	15	43.68	24	68.62
23	Ysaline Hibon	Luxembourg	109.45	20	39.60	23	69.85
24	Lili Krizsanovszki	Hungary	109.31	21	38.66	22	70.69
25	Celia Vandhana Garnacho	Spain	96.66	25	34.73	25	61.93
26	Elizabeth Golding	Ireland	93.91	26	32.41	26	61.50
27	Luiza-Elena Ilie	Romania	88.02	27	31.27	27	56.75
28	Lisa Amaechi	Austria	85.26	28	31.02	28	54.24
29	Despoina Katsarou	Greece	78.00	29	27.41	29	50.59
30	Jana Kukovska	North Macedonia	68.71	30	24.98	30	43.73
31	Zara Husedzinovic	Bosnia and Herzegovina	48.90	31	20.15	31	28.75
WD	Darja Mijatović	Serbia	withdrew	withdrew from competition			
