= Arlet Levandi =

Estonian figure skater (born 2005)

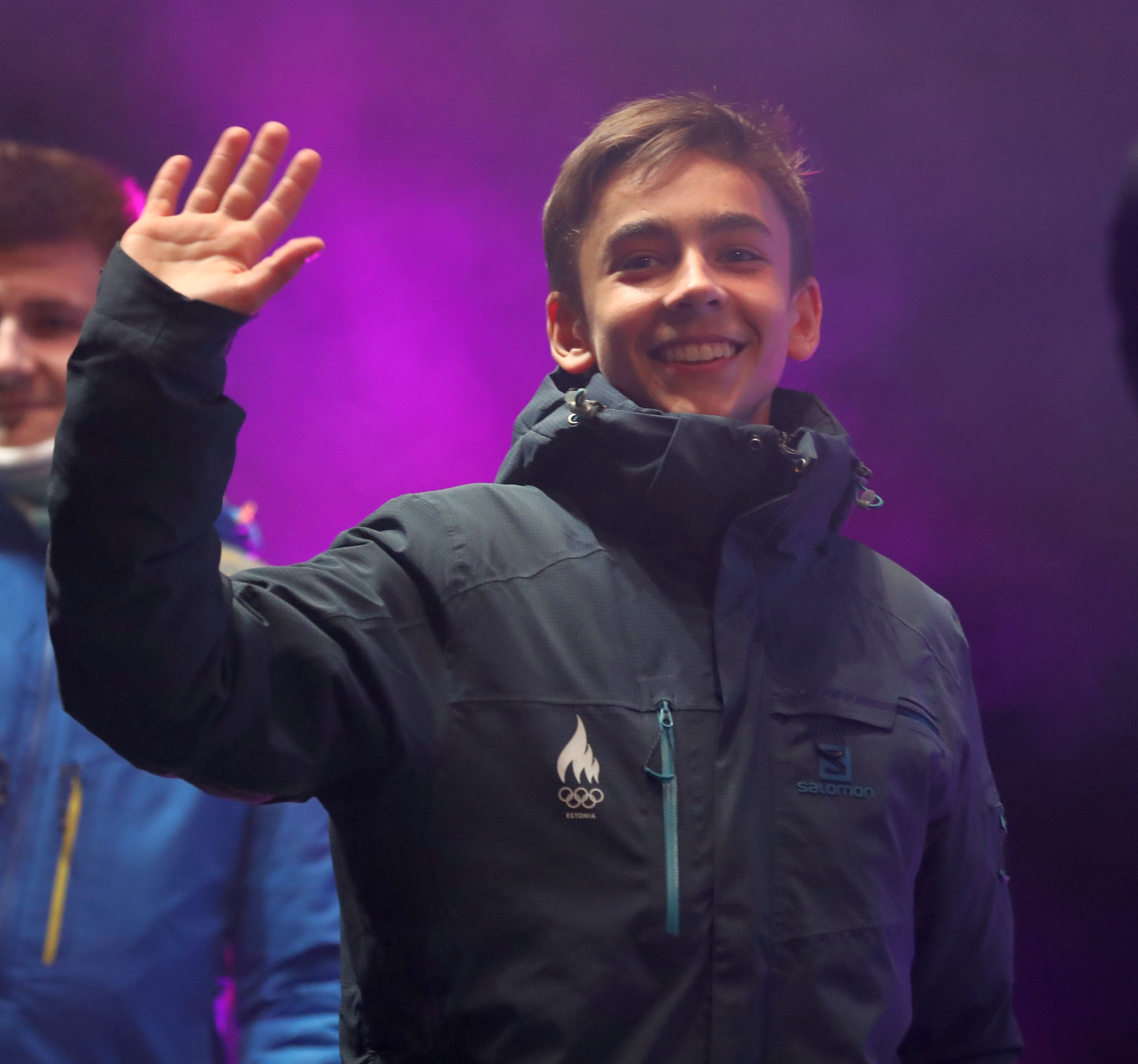
- Levandi at the 2020 Winter Youth Olympics

Personal information
- Born: 28 November 2005 (age 20) Tallinn, Estonia
- Height: 1.76 m (5 ft 9 1/2 in)

Figure skating career
- Country: Estonia
- Discipline: Men's singles
- Coach: Anna Levandi; Jekaterina Nekrassova
- Skating club: Anna Levandi FSC Tallinn
- Began skating: 2009

Medal record
Estonian Championships
Silver medal – second place	2021 Tallinn	Singles
Silver medal – second place	2022 Tallinn	Singles
Bronze medal – third place	2023 Tallinn	Singles
Bronze medal – third place	2024 Tallinn	Singles
Bronze medal – third place	2025 Tallinn	Singles
Bronze medal – third place	2026 Tallinn	Singles
Winter Youth Olympics
Gold medal – first place	2020 Lausanne	Team

Arlet Levandi (born 28 November 2005) is an Estonian figure skater. He is a two-time Challenger Series medal and a six-time Estonian national medalist.

At the junior level, he is the 2022 European Youth Olympic Festival champion, the 2021 JGP France II silver medalist, the 2021 JGP Slovenia silver medalist, 2024 JGP Turkey bronze medalist, and a 2020 Winter Youth Olympic champion in the team event. Levandi is the first men's singles skater from Estonia to win a Junior Grand Prix medal.

== Personal life ==
Levandi was born on 28 November 2005, in Tallinn, Estonia, to Anna (née Kondrashova) and Allar Levandi. He has two older brothers. His mother competed in singles for the Soviet Union and is a two-time Olympian, the 1984 World silver medalist, and a four-time European bronze medalist (1984, 1986–88). His father is the 1988 Olympic bronze medalist and a 1987 World team bronze medalist in Nordic combined. Levandi attends school at the Old Town Education College and speaks fluent English.

He has cited Florent Amodio, Jason Brown, and Deniss Vasiljevs as his figure skating idols.

== Career ==
=== Early career ===
Levandi began skating in 2009. He is coached by his mother, Anna Levandi, a former Soviet figure skater, at her eponymous club in Tallinn.

Levandi is the 2017 Estonian national advanced novice bronze medalist and the 2018 Estonian national advanced novice silver medalist. At the advanced novice level Internationally, he is the 2018 Prague Riedell Ice Cup champion and a two-time Tallink Hotels Cup champion. Levandi did not compete during most of the 2018–19 season, including the 2019 Estonian Championships.

=== 2019–20 season: Junior international debut ===
Levandi made his junior international debut at the 2019 Halloween Cup in Budapest, where he finished fourth overall. He then earned fifth-place finishes at the Volvo Open Cup and the Tallinn Trophy before winning the bronze medal at the Golden Spin of Zagreb. Having missed the prior season, Levandi skipped the junior level entirely to compete at the senior level at the 2020 Estonian Championships. He finished fourth and was chosen to represent Estonia at the 2020 Winter Youth Olympics.

At the Winter Youth Olympics, Levandi was thirteenth in the short program after issues with his blades, but scored eleventh in the free skate to finish twelfth overall. In the team event, he was chosen by draw as part of Team Courage alongside ladies' singles skater Kseniia Sinitsyna of Russia, pairs team Alina Butaeva and Luka Berulava of Georgia, and ice dancers Utana Yoshida and Shingo Nishiyama of Japan. Levandi finished seventh in the men's portion of the event, while Team Courage won the gold medal overall. He reflected on the event: "I was very happy with the draw, and now we are Youth Olympic champions."

=== 2020–21 season ===
With the COVID-19 pandemic causing the cancellation of the Junior Grand Prix series, junior skaters had limited international competitive opportunities. Levandi began the season at the Tallinn Open Championships before he competed at the inaugural Budapest Trophy, where he won the gold medal. He then won the gold medal at the Tallinn Trophy. Competing at the senior level at the 2021 Estonian Championships, Levandi was third in the short program and second in the free skate to win the silver medal. He finished his season with another gold medal win at the Tallink Hotels Cup.

=== 2021–22 season: Junior Grand Prix silver; senior international debut ===
Levandi began his season on the Junior Grand Prix. He won the silver medal at the 2021 JGP France II, becoming the first Estonian man to medal at an ISU Junior Grand Prix event. With his teammates Solène Mazingue and Marko Jevgeni Gaidajenko winning bronze in ice dance, it was Estonia's first multi-medal performance on the JGP since the 2006 JGP Czech Republic. At his second JGP event in Slovenia, Levandi rebounded from sixth after the short program to finish second in the free skate and overall to win his second silver medal of the series. However, he did not qualify for the 2021–22 Junior Grand Prix Final due to the unique qualification procedure implemented as a result of the pandemic.

Levandi also made his senior international debut this season at the 2021 Lombardia Trophy, earning personal bests in the short program and combined total to finish seventh overall. At his second Challenger Series event, the 2021 Finlandia Trophy, he again scored new personal bests to place seventh overall. Levandi again improved his short program personal best at the 2021 Cup of Austria en route to a sixth-place finish.

Levandi won the silver medal at the Estonian Championships in December. The following month, he qualified to the free skate at the 2022 European Championships in his hometown of Tallinn, where he finished in fourteenth place. Levandi was not selected for the Olympic or the World Championships teams, but was named to the 2022 European Youth Olympic Winter Festival and the 2022 World Junior Championships teams.

Levandi returned to the junior level at the 2022 European Youth Olympic Festival, where he finished first in both segments to comfortably win the gold medal by over 20 points. He concluded his season at the 2022 World Junior Championships, again in front of a home crowd in Tallinn, where he finished in twelfth place.

=== 2022–23 season: First junior national title; Grand Prix debut ===
Levandi competed in several Challenger Series events to begin the season, finishing seventh at the 2022 U.S. International Classic, tenth at the 2022 Finlandia Trophy, and fourteenth at the 2022 Warsaw Cup. Making his Grand Prix debut, he finished seventh at the 2022 Grand Prix of Espoo.

At the 2023 Estonian Championships, Levandi won the bronze medal at the senior level and the gold medal at the junior level. He then went on to win gold medals at both the 2023 Volvo Open Cup and the 2023 Tallink Hotels Cup.

Selected to compete at the 2023 World Junior Championships in Calgary, Canada, Levandi finished in ninth place.

=== 2023–24 season ===
Levandi began the season by finishing eighth at both the 2023 Lombardia Trophy and the 2023 Finlandia Trophy, before finishing fourth at the 2023 Denis Ten Memorial Challenge. He was invited to compete on the Grand Prix at the 2023 Grand Prix of Espoo, where he finished in tenth place.

At the 2024 World Junior Championships, Levandi finished in seventh place. He said that he felt he had made progress that season by landing more difficult jumps in practice, though not yet in competition, and this would be his focus during the off-season.

=== 2024–25 season ===
Levandi started the season by returning to the Junior Grand Prix series, taking bronze at 2024 JGP Turkey and finishing sixth at 2024 JGP Slovenia. Going on to compete on the 2024–25 ISU Challenger Series, Levandi finished eleventh at the 2024 CS Trophée Métropole Nice Côte d'Azur, fifth at the 2024 CS Tallinn Trophy, and fifth at the 2024 CS Golden Spin of Zagreb.

In mid-December, Levandi competed at the 2025 Estonian Championships, where he won the bronze medal on the senior level and the gold medal on the junior level. The following month, Levandi competed at the 2025 Winter World University Games in Turin, Italy, where he finished in tenth place.

In February, Levandi won the gold medal at the 2025 Tallink Hotels Cup and eighth at the 2025 World Junior Championships. “Oh my god, I am so happy!” said Levandi after the free skate. “I always dreamed of landing the triple Axel on a big stage, and I actually did it. It just feels incredible! I'm almost lost for words right now. It's just such a different experience doing it in competition compared to practice. I think the difference today was that I really didn't think too much, I just let my muscle memory take over.”

=== 2025–26 season ===
Levandi opened the season by winning gold at the 2025 Crystal Skate Open. He went on to compete at three 2025–26 Challenger Series, finishing fourth at the 2025 CS Trialeti Trophy, bronze at the 2025 CS Tallinn Trophy, and silver at the 2025 CS Golden Spin of Zagreb. Between the latter two events, Levandi also won gold at the 2025 Lõunakeskus Trophy and at the 2025 Volvo Open Cup.

In mid-December, he won the bronze medal at the 2025 Estonian Championships for a fourth-consecutive time. Levandi then finished the season by winning four consecutive gold medals at the 2026 Volvo Open Cup, 2026 Tallink Hotels Cup, 2026 Sonja Henie Trophy, and 2026 Crystal Skate Spring.

== Programs ==
Season	Short program	Free skate	Exhibition	Ref.
2019–20	"Natural" by Imagine Dragons Choreo. by Vakhtang Murvanidze	"Adagio" From Concierto de Aranjuez By Joaquín Rodrigo; "Malagueña" By Ernesto Lecuona Choreo. by Vakhtang Murvanidze	—N/a	
2020–21	"Natural" by Imagine Dragons Choreo. by Vakhtang Murvanidze	"La terre vue du ciel" By Armand Amar Choreo. by Vakhtang Murvanidze	—N/a	
2021–22	Carmen By Georges Bizet Arranged by Stromae Choreo. by Benoît Richaud	"La terre vue du ciel" By Armand Amar Choreo. by Vakhtang Murvanidze	—N/a	
2022–23	"Yumeji's Theme" From In the Mood for Love By Shigeru Umebayashi; Études No. 6 By Philip Glass Performed by Víkingur Ólafsson Choreo. by Benoît Richaud	"Andrei"; "La terre vue du ciel" By Armand Amar Choreo. by Benoît Richaud; "Adagio For Tron"; "The Grid"; "Derezzed" All from Tron: Legacy By Daft Punk Choreo. by Benoît Richaud	"Quand c'est?" By Stromae Choreo. by Arlet Levandi; "Papaoutai" By Stromae Choreo. by Arlet Levandi	
2023–24	"Yumeji's Theme" From In the Mood for Love By Shigeru Umebayashi; Études No. 6 By Philip Glass Performed by Víkingur Ólafsson Choreo. by Benoît Richaud; "Mauvaise journée" By Stromae Choreo. by Florent Amodio	Paris From Yves Saint Laurent; Baïkal From In the Forests of Siberia By Ibrahim Maalouf Choreo. by Benoît Richaud	Tous les mêmes By Stromae Choreo. by Arlet Levandi	
2024–25	The Fifth Element; Lucia di lammermoor; The Diva Dance By Éric Serra & Inva Mula Choreo. by Benoît Richaud	Brotsjór By Ólafur Arnalds; G-Minor From Venice: Infinitely Avantgarde By Hania Rani; Title of the Glory From The Glory By Jung Se-rin; Gravitational Forces By ITG Studio & Drew J. Lerdal; Obscura By Christian Reindl & Power-Haus Choreo. by Benoît Richaud	Wasteland (from Arcane) by Royal & the Serpent	
2025–26	Camping (from The Theory of Everything) By Jóhann Jóhannsson; Truman Sleeps (from The Truman Show) By Jonas Kvarnström & Philip Glass; Chalkboard (from The Theory of Everything) By Jóhann Jóhannsson Arranged by Cédric Tour Choreo. by Benoît Richaud	Brotsjór By Ólafur Arnalds; G-Minor From Venice: Infinitely Avantgarde By Hania Rani; Title of the Glory From The Glory By Jung Se-rin; Gravitational Forces By ITG Studio & Drew J. Lerdal; Obscura By Christian Reindl & Power-Haus Choreo. by Benoît Richaud		

== Competitive highlights ==
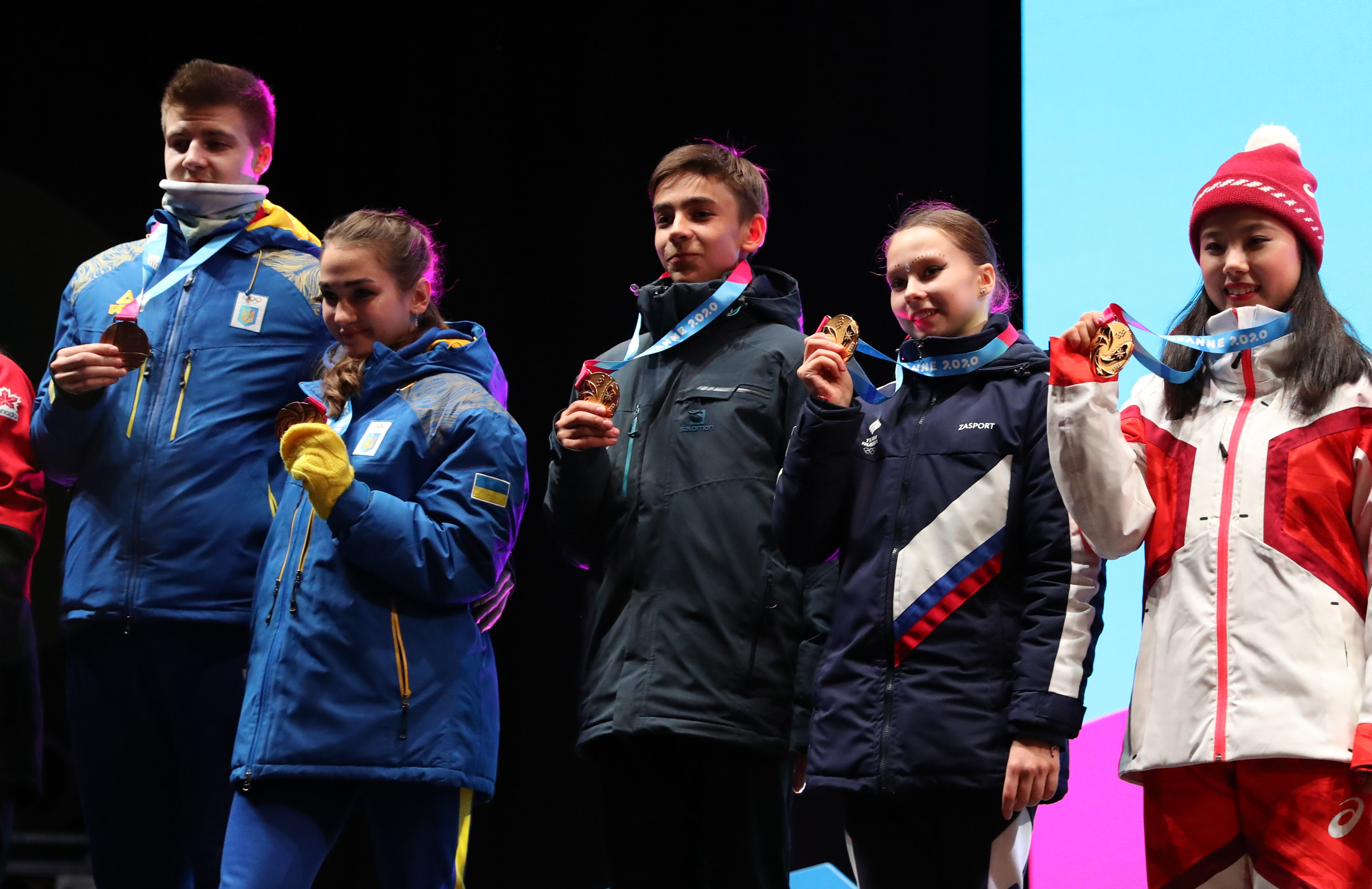
Levandi (center) on the podium at the 2020 Winter Youth Olympics

- GP – Event of the ISU Grand Prix Series
- JGP – Event of the ISU Junior Grand Prix Series
- CS – Event of the ISU Challenger Series
- TBD – Assigned
- WD – Withdrew from competition
- Medals at team events are awarded for the team results only. Individual placements at team events are listed in parentheses.

Competition placements at senior level
Season	2019–20	2020–21	2021–22	2022–23	2023–24	2024–25	2025–26	2026–27
European Championships			14th					
Estonian Championships	4th	2nd	2nd	3rd	3rd	3rd	3rd	
GP Finland				7th	8th			TBD
CS Budapest Trophy								6th
CS Cup of Austria			6th					
CS Denis Ten Memorial					4th			
CS Finlandia Trophy			7th	10th	8th			
CS Golden Spin of Zagreb						5th	2nd	
CS Lombardia Trophy			7th		8th			
CS Nebelhorn Trophy								7th
CS Tallinn Trophy						5th	3rd	
CS Trialeti Trophy							4th	
CS Trophée Métropole Nice						11th		
CS U.S. Classic				7th				
CS Warsaw Cup				14th				
Crystal Skate Open							1st	
Crystal Skate Spring							1st	
Lõunakeskus Trophy							1st	
Sonja Henie Trophy							1st	
Tallink Hotels Cup			1st	1st			1st	
Tallinn Open								3rd
Volvo Open Cup (Note: Volvo Open Cup Fall)				2nd			1st	1st
Volvo Open Cup (Note: Volvo Open Cup Spring)				1st	1st		1st	
Winter University Games						10th		

Competition placements at junior level
Season	2019–20	2020–21	2021–22	2022–23	2023–24	2024–25
Winter Youth Olympics	12th					
Winter Youth Olympics (Team event)	1st					
World Junior Championships			12th	9th	7th	8th
Estonian Championships	3rd		2nd	1st	1st	1st
JGP France			2nd			
JGP Slovenia			2nd			6th
JGP Turkey						3rd
Budapest Trophy		1st				
European Youth Olympic Festival			1st			
Golden Spin of Zagreb	3rd					
Halloween Cup	4th					
Kurbada Cup			WD			
Tallink Hotels Cup	1st	1st			1st	
Tallinn Trophy	5th					
Volvo Open Cup	5th					

== Detailed results ==
ISU personal best scores in the +5/-5 GOE System
Segment	Type	Score	Event
Total	TSS	228.52	2025 CS Tallinn Trophy
Short program	TSS	81.50	2026 CS Budapest Trophy
Short program	TES	42.75	2026 CS Budapest Trophy
Short program	PCS	38.75	2026 CS Budapest Trophy
Free skating	TSS	152.47	2021 CS Finlandia Trophy
Free skating	TES	76.23	2025 CS Trialeti Trophy
Free skating	PCS	79.00	2021 CS Finlandia Trophy

=== Senior level ===
Results in the 2019–20 season
Date	Event	SP		FS		Total	
Date	Event	P	Score	P	Score	P	Score
Dec 13–15, 2019	(Estonia) 2020 Estonian Championships	4	60.01	4	92.80	4	152.81

Results in the 2020–21 season
Date	Event	SP		FS		Total	
Date	Event	P	Score	P	Score	P	Score
Dec 30–31, 2020	(Estonia) 2021 Estonian Championships	3	65.36	2	133.28	2	198.64

Results in the 2021–22 season
Date	Event	SP		FS		Total	
Date	Event	P	Score	P	Score	P	Score
Sep 9–12, 2021	(Italy) 2021 CS Lombardia Trophy	11	63.67	6	135.00	7	198.67
Oct 7–10, 2021	(Finland) 2021 CS Finlandia Trophy	9	70.14	6	152.47	7	222.61
Nov 11–14, 2021	2021 CS Cup of Austria	5	75.10	3	144.73	6	219.83
Dec 4–5, 2021	(Estonia) 2022 Estonian Championships	2	71.55	1	151.97	2	223.52
Jan 10–16, 2022	(Estonia) 2022 European Championships	17	70.04	13	138.48	14	208.52
Mar 4–6, 2022	(Estonia) 2022 Tallink Hotels Cup	2	68.48	1	153.06	1	221.54

Results in the 2022–23 season
Date	Event	SP		FS		Total	
Date	Event	P	Score	P	Score	P	Score
Sep 12–16, 2022	(United States) 2022 CS U.S. International Classic	7	70.02	7	132.27	7	202.29
Oct 4–9, 2022	(Finland) 2022 CS Finlandia Trophy	11	65.97	10	131.31	10	197.28
Nov 3–4, 2022	(Latvia) 2022 Volvo Open Cup (47th)	4	65.97	2	131.31	2	206.66
Nov 17–20, 2022	(Poland) 2022 CS Warsaw Cup	12	69.45	14	126.27	14	195.72
Nov 25–27, 2022	(Finland) 2022 Grand Prix of Espoo	6	72.67	7	136.83	7	209.50
Dec 15–17, 2022	(Estonia) 2023 Estonian Championships	3	63.31	3	141.00	3	204.31
Jan 19–22, 2023	(Latvia) 2023 Volvo Open Cup (48th)	1	76.82	1	142.52	1	219.34
Feb 16–19, 2023	(Estonia) 2023 Tallink Hotels Cup	2	76.34	1	149.45	1	225.79

Results in the 2023–24 season
Date	Event	SP		FS		Total	
Date	Event	P	Score	P	Score	P	Score
Sep 8–10, 2023	(Italy) 2023 CS Lombardia Trophy	7	64.75	10	120.98	8	185.73
Oct 4–8, 2023	(Finland) 2023 CS Finlandia Trophy	8	70.22	9	140.19	8	210.41
Nov 2–5, 2023	(Kazakhstan) 2023 CS Denis Ten Memorial Challenge	3	74.47	6	141.65	4	216.12
Nov 17–19, 2023	(Finland) 2023 Grand Prix of Espoo	11	61.82	8	134.91	10	195.83
Dec 16–17, 2023	(Estonia) 2024 Estonian Championships	2	74.75	3	144.78	3	219.53
Jan 18–21, 2024	(Latvia) 2024 Volvo Open Cup	1	70.18	1	137.31	1	207.49

Results in the 2024–25 season
Date	Event	SP		FS		Total	
Date	Event	P	Score	P	Score	P	Score
Oct 16–20, 2024	(France) 2024 CS Trophée Métropole Nice Côte d'Azur	13	65.90	9	140.00	11	205.90
Nov 11–17, 2024	(Estonia) 2024 CS Tallinn Trophy	6	71.13	5	139.69	5	210.82
Dec 4–7, 2024	(Croatia) 2024 CS Golden Spin of Zagreb	4	75.71	5	138.08	5	213.79
Dec 14–15, 2024	(Estonia) 2025 Estonian Championships	3	76.88	3	151.22	3	228.10
Jan 16–18, 2025	(Italy) 2025 Winter World University Games	15	63.29	9	139.12	10	202.41

Results in the 2025–26 season
Date	Event	SP		FS		Total	
Date	Event	P	Score	P	Score	P	Score
Sep 25–28, 2025	(Estonia) 2025 Crystal Skate Open	1	75.61	1	145.14	1	220.75
Oct 8–11, 2025	(Georgia (country)) 2025 CS Trialeti Trophy	8	72.70	4	150.83	4	223.53
Oct 15–19, 2025	(Estonia) 2025 Lõunakeskus Trophy	1	75.82	1	156.36	1	232.18
Nov 5–9, 2025	(Latvia) 2025 Volvo Open Cup	1	77.01	1	158.59	1	235.60
Nov 25–30, 2025	(Estonia) 2025 CS Tallinn Trophy	3	77.45	3	151.07	3	228.52
Dec 3–6, 2025	(Croatia) 2025 CS Golden Spin of Zagreb	9	75.46	2	151.42	2	226.88
Dec 13–14, 2025	(Estonia) 2026 Estonian Championships	3	78.87	3	156.56	3	235.43
Jan 22–25, 2026	(Latvia) 2026 Volvo Open Cup	1	79.23	1	147.31	1	226.54
Feb 19–22, 2026	(Estonia) 2026 Tallink Hotels Cup	1	78.08	1	154.01	1	232.09
Mar 5–8, 2026	(Norway) 2026 Sonja Henie Trophy	1	83.47	1	161.17	1	244.64
Mar 19–22, 2026	(Estonia) 2026 Crystal Skate Spring	1	80.57	1	150.59	1	231.16

Results in the 2026–27 season
Date	Event	SP		FS		Total	
Date	Event	P	Score	P	Score	P	Score
Sep 11–13, 2026	(Estonia) 2026 Tallinn Open	2	76.67	3	134.03	3	210.70
Sep 24–26, 2026	(Germany) 2026 CS Nebelhorn Trophy	9	72.19	4	145.97	7	218.16
Oct 15-18, 2026	(Hungary) 2026 CS Budapest Trophy	3	81.50	7	144.56	6	226.06
Nov 4–8, 2026	(Latvia) 2026 Volvo Open Cup	1	76.95	1	151.59	1	228.54

=== Junior level ===
Results in the 2019–20 season
Date	Event	SP		FS		Total	
Date	Event	P	Score	P	Score	P	Score
Oct 17–20, 2019	(Hungary) 2019 Halloween Cup	5	51.49	4	94.98	4	146.47
Nov 5–10, 2019	(Latvia) 2019 Volvo Open Cup	4	55.86	6	101.05	5	156.91
Nov 11–17, 2019	(Estonia) 2019 Tallinn Trophy	7	41.08	3	100.33	5	141.41
Dec 4–7, 2019	(Croatia) 2019 Golden Spin of Zagreb	3	49.95	4	79.11	3	129.06
Jan 10–15, 2020	(Switzerland) 2020 Winter Youth Olympics	13	49.87	11	104.78	12	154.65
Jan 10–15, 2020	(Switzerland) 2020 Winter Youth Olympics (Team event)	—N/a	—N/a	7	97.63	1	—N/a
Feb 1–2, 2020	(Estonia) 2020 Estonian Championships (Junior)	3	54.47	3	118.32	3	172.79
Feb 13–16, 2020	(Estonia) 2020 Tallink Hotels Cup	1	62.87	1	97.18	1	160.05

Results in the 2020–21 season
Date	Event	SP		FS		Total	
Date	Event	P	Score	P	Score	P	Score
Oct 15–17, 2020	(Hungary) 2020 Budapest Trophy	1	50.65	1	115.04	1	165.69
Feb 18–21, 2021	(Estonia) 2021 Tallink Hotels Cup	1	64.57	1	115.28	1	179.85

Results in the 2021–22 season
Date	Event	SP		FS		Total	
Date	Event	P	Score	P	Score	P	Score
Aug 25–28, 2021	2021 JGP France II	3	61.73	1	135.20	2	196.93
Sep 22–25, 2021	2021 JGP Slovenia	6	59.60	2	134.75	2	194.35
Feb 5–6, 2022	(Estonia) 2022 Estonian Championships (Junior)	2	75.29	1	146.48	2	221.77
Mar 20–25, 2022	(Finland) 2022 European Youth Olympic Winter Festival	1	70.55	1	138.99	1	209.54
Apr 8–10, 2022	(Latvia) 2022 Kurbada Cup	1	73.65	—N/a	—N/a	–	WD
Apr 13–17, 2022	(Estonia) 2022 World Junior Championships	14	65.31	10	134.79	12	200.10

Results in the 2022–23 season
Date	Event	SP		FS		Total	
Date	Event	P	Score	P	Score	P	Score
Feb 4–5, 2023	(Estonia) 2023 Estonian Championships (Junior)	1	77.55	1	147.10	1	224.65
Feb 27 – Mar 5, 2023	(Canada) 2023 World Junior Championships	12	71.01	7	133.72	9	204.73

Results in the 2023–24 season
Date	Event	SP		FS		Total	
Date	Event	P	Score	P	Score	P	Score
Feb 3–4, 2024	(Estonia) 2024 Estonian Championships (Junior)	1	70.94	1	141.81	1	212.75
Feb 15–18, 2024	(Estonia) 2024 Tallink Hotels Cup	2	75.07	1	136.71	1	211.78
Feb 26 – Mar 3, 2024	(Taiwan) 2024 World Junior Championships	8	75.43	6	136.55	7	211.98

Results in the 2024–25 season
Date	Event	SP		FS		Total	
Date	Event	P	Score	P	Score	P	Score
Sep 18–21, 2024	2024 JGP Turkey	5	63.60	2	132.48	3	196.08
Oct 2–5, 2024	2024 JGP Slovenia	5	69.11	6	131.14	6	200.25
Dec 20–21, 2024	(Estonia) 2025 Estonian Championships (Junior)	1	74.33	1	138.37	1	212.70
Feb 25 – Mar 2, 2025	(Hungary) 2025 World Junior Championships	12	72.42	6	146.48	8	218.90
