= Kyrylo Marsak =

Ukrainian figure skater (born 2004)

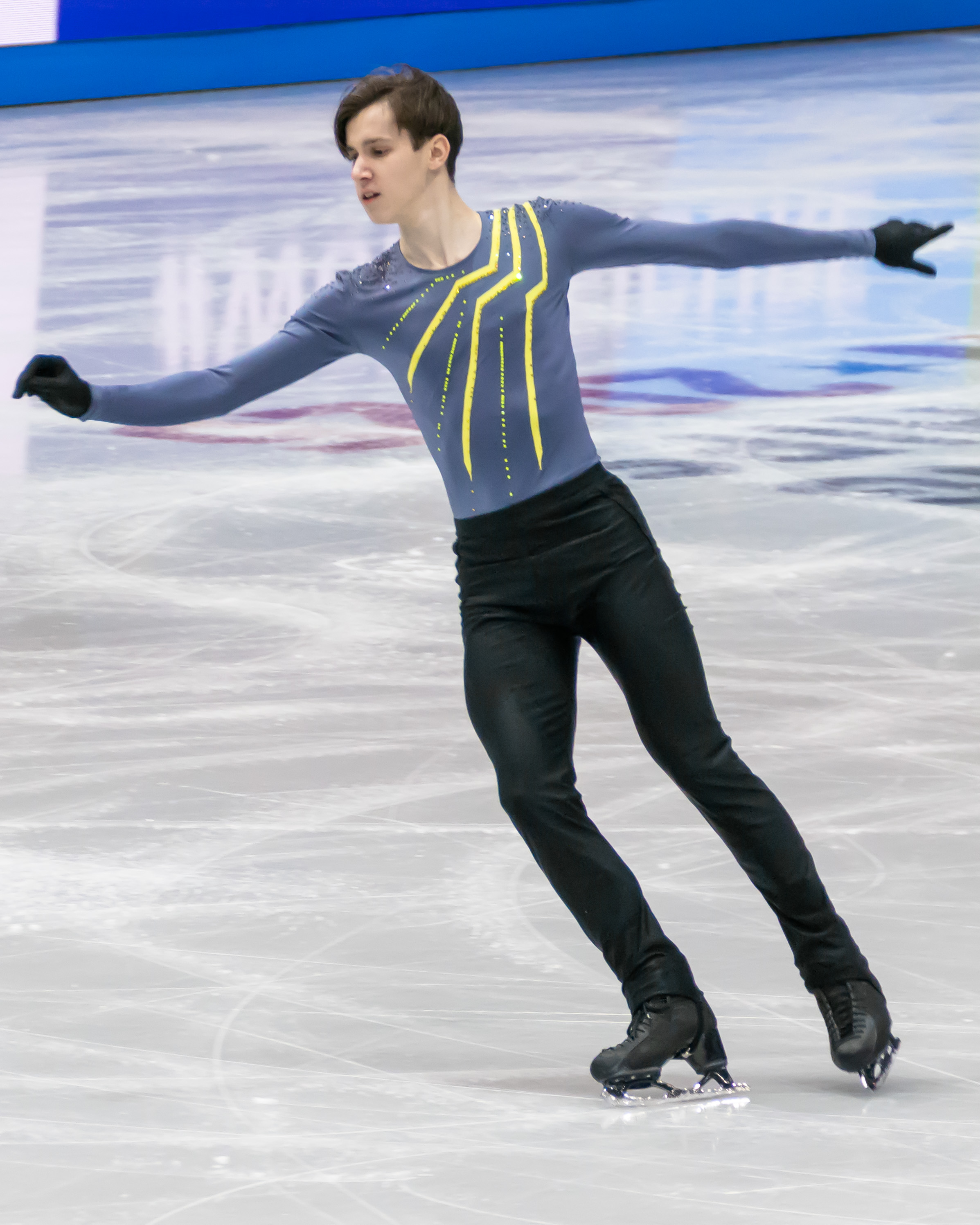
- Marsak at the 2025 World Championships

Personal information
- Native name: Кирило Андрійович Марсак
- Full name: Kyrylo Andriyovych Marsak
- Born: 7 September 2004 (age 22) Kherson, Ukraine
- Home town: Kyiv, Ukraine
- Height: 1.78 m (5 ft 10 in)

Figure skating career
- Country: Ukraine
- Discipline: Men's singles
- Coach: Alina Mayer-Virtanen; Oleksandr Tumanovskyi; Alisa Romanenko
- Skating club: Leader Kyiv
- Began skating: 2009

Medal record
Ukrainian Championships
Gold medal – first place	2023 Bohuslav	Singles
Gold medal – first place	2024 Bohuslav	Singles
Gold medal – first place	2025 Bohuslav	Singles
Gold medal – first place	2026 Bohuslav	Singles
Bronze medal – third place	2022 Kyiv	Singles

Kyrylo Andriyovych Marsak (Ukrainian: Кирило Андрійович Марсак; born 7 September 2004) is a Ukrainian figure skater. He is the two-time Tallinn Trophy bronze medalist, a two-time Volvo Open Cup medalist (gold in 2024, bronze in 2022), 2023 Bavarian Open bronze medalist, and a four-time Ukrainian national champion (2023–26).

== Personal life ==
Marsak was born in Kherson, Ukraine to parents, Zoya and Andriy, and grew up in Kyiv. He also has a sister, Yelyzaveta Marsak, who is six years older.

In February 2022, Russia invaded Ukraine with Marsak's home city of Kyiv being one of the first areas of attack. Three weeks following the initial invasion, Marsak and his sister fled the country, eventually settling in Toruń, Poland. In June, Marsak moved to Laukaa, Finland for his training while his sister remained in Poland where she opened up her own figure skating school called, “On Ice with Elizabeth.” With this school, Yelyzaveta organises masterclasses and skating camps together with other Ukrainian athletes for skaters of all levels.

Marsak is currently a student at the National University of Ukraine on Physical Education and Sport. He speaks Ukrainian, Russian, English, and Finnish.

== Career ==
=== Early years ===
Marsak began learning to skate in 2009. During the 2018–19 season, he made his first appearance at the senior-level Ukrainian Championships.

=== 2021–22 season: Junior international debut ===
For most of the season, Marsak trained in Kyiv, coached by Dmytro Shkidchenko. He started the season by placing fourth on the junior level at the 2021 Victor Petrenko Cup. He followed this up by winning his first senior national medal, a bronze, at the 2022 Ukrainian Championships.

In early February, Marsak won bronze on the junior level at the 2022 Jégvirág Cup. Later that month, however, Russia launched a massive invasion of Ukraine leading to Marsak fleeing the country, temporarily settling in Toruń. Only one month following this, he competed at both the 2022 European Youth Olympic Winter Festival and the 2022 World Junior Championships, placing fifteenth and thirty-third, respectively.

=== 2022–23 season: Senior international debut; First National title ===
After spending some time in Latvia, Marsak went to Laukaa, Finland in June 2022 after being invited to partake in a training camp led by Alina Mayer-Virtanen. In response to an appeal from the Ukrainian Figure Skating Federation, she and her husband, Valtter Virtanen, helped Marsak prepare for the season. In August, he began training at the couple's skating club, the Peurunka Skating Academy in Laukaa after Virtanen decided to fund Marsak's skating career and allow him touse their rink free of charge. Meanwhile, Marsak's longtime coach, Dmitri Shkidchenko remained in Ukraine but continued to guide Marsak via Viber.

In September, Marsak placed ninth at the ISU Junior Grand Prix event in Latvia. He made his senior international debut in October, at the 2022 CS Finlandia Trophy. His first senior international medals, both bronze, came the following month, at the Volvo Open Cup in Latvia and the Tallinn Trophy in Estonia.

In January, Ukraine named Marsak to replace the injured Ivan Shmuratko at the 2023 European Championships in Espoo, Finland. He qualified to the final segment in seventeenth place after the short program, where he scored a personal best. Marsak placed twenty-second in the free skate and finished twenty-first overall. The day of the free program, Marsak had learned that his coach, Shkidchenko had died.

He went on to compete at the 2023 World Junior Championships in Calgary, Alberta, where he finished fifteenth, scoring personal bests in the free skate and combined total segments of the competition.

Marsak made his World Championship debut at the 2023 World Championships in Saitama, Japan, where he placed twenty-fifth in the short program and did not advance to the free skate segment of the competition despite delivering a solid program. He closed his season by winning the gold medal at the 2023 Ukrainian Championships.

=== 2023–24 season ===
Marsak began the season with a Junior Grand Prix appearance, coming fourteenth at the 2023 JGP Turkey. He then competed on the 2023-24 ISU Challenger Series, finishing fifteenth at the 2023 Finlandia Trophy, eleventh at the 2023 Denis Ten Memorial Challenge, and fifteenth at the 2023 Warsaw Cup.

Marsak went on to win bronze at the 2023 Tallinn Trophy and gold on the junior level of the 2024 Volvo Open Cup. At the 2024 Bavarian Open and the 2024 Tallink Cup, Marsak finished eleventh and fourth at these events.

Selected to compete at the 2024 World Junior Championships in Taipei, Taiwan, Marsak placed twenty-third. He closed his season by winning his second consecutive national title at the 2024 Ukrainian Championships.

=== 2024–25 season ===
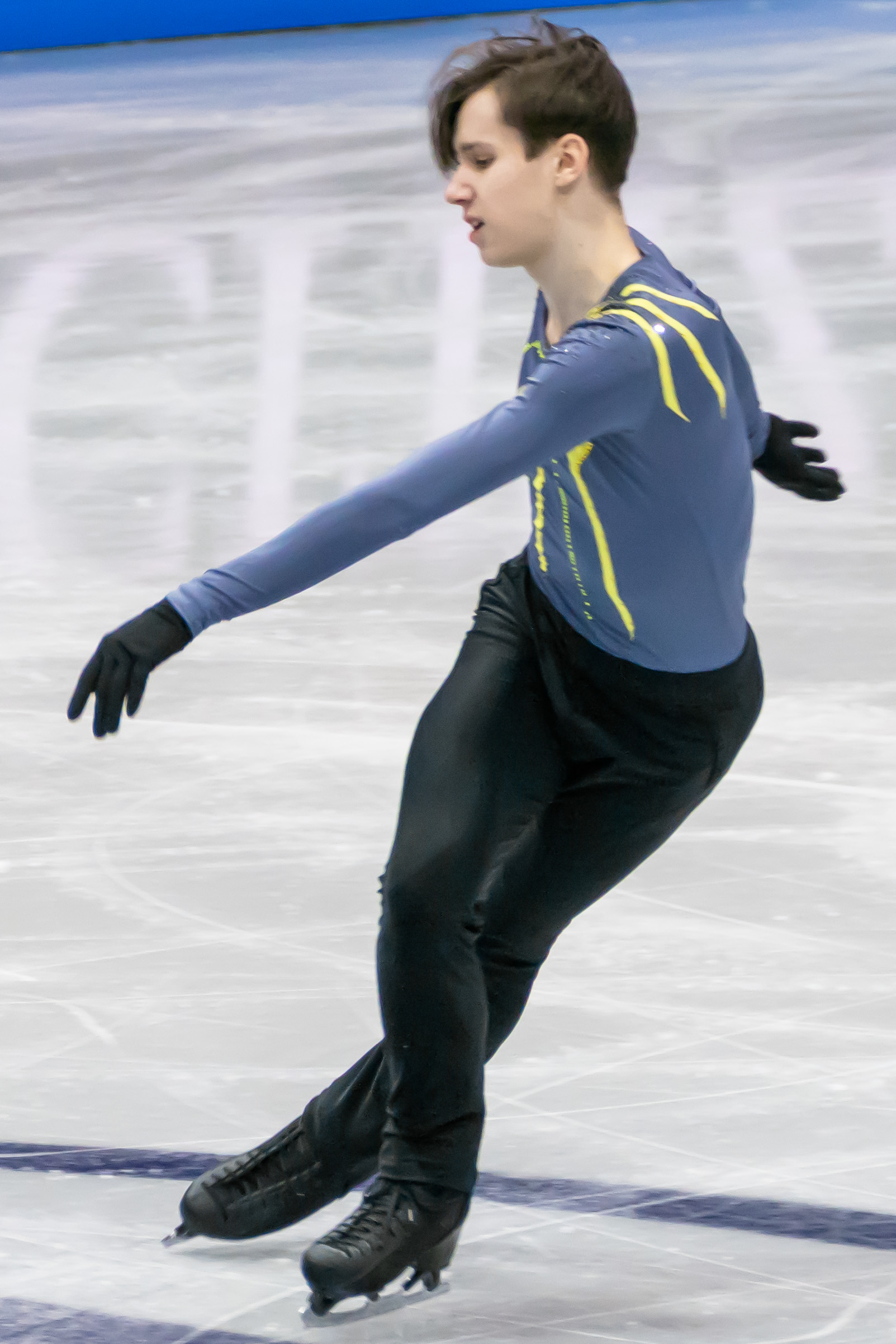
Marsak performing his short program at the 2025 World Championships

Marsak opened the season by finishing sixth at the 2024 CS Denis Ten Memorial Challenge. He followed this up by winning gold at the 2024 Volvo Open Cup. Continuing to compete on the 2024-25 ISU Challenger Series, he placed fifteenth at the 2024 CS Tallinn Trophy and fifth at the 2024 CS Warsaw Cup.

In January, Marsak competed at the 2025 Winter World University Games in Turin, Italy. He placed twenty-fifth in the short program and did not advance to the free skate segment. The following month, he competed at the Road to 26 Trophy, a test event for the 2026 Winter Olympics, finishing in eighth place.

Marsak subsequently closed the season by competing at the 2025 World Championships in Boston, Massachusetts, United States. He placed thirty-third in the short program and did not advance to the free skate segment. In an interview following his performance, he shared, "I am so disappointed. Trainings went so well, I’m physically ready, but I don’t know, something is wrong mentally, and it’s really, really frustrating. I do keep going because I love this sport. Now I will prepare for the qualifier. I just love figure skating, I follow every competition. I also enjoy teaching the little kids in Finland, where I train right now. And I just love every aspect of figure skating, but right now, it’s really, really frustrating."

In April, Marsak competed at the 2025 Ukrainian Championships, winning his third consecutive national title. His father, Andriy took two weeks off from his army duties to watch his son compete at the event in Bohuslav. However, while in attendance, most of Andriy's army unit were killed. "It was a very bad situation, so that trip most likely saved him," Marsak remarked. "If he had been there, it’s not certain that we would have seen each other again."

=== 2025–26 season: Milano Cortina Olympics ===
Working with choreographer, Ekaterina Ivleva Guarise, Marsak selected the song, "Fall on Me" by Andrea and Matteo Bocelli to use for his short program, dedicating it to his father, Andrii, who had been serving on the frontline of Ukraine’s defense in the Russo-Ukrainian war. Additionally, Marsak's Euphoria-themed free skate was created with the intention of containing subtle references to the ongoing war. Speaking on this, Marsak shared, "The words ‘I’m tired’ resonate with all Ukrainians. So much bad news, so many traumatic events – it all piles up until you feel completely drained. But the second song, ‘The Feels,’ is about continuing to move forward even when you feel exhausted. It’s about finding strength and joy in what you do. For me, this translates to my feelings on the ice."

Marsak started the season by finishing eleventh at the 2025 CS Lombardia Trophy. He then went on to compete at the ISU Skate to Milano, the final qualifying event for the 2026 Winter Olympics. Marsak's fourth-place finish at the event earned Ukraine a quota for the men's singles discipline at the Games. In an interview following the event, Marsak shared his happiness with the result, saying, "I can’t believe it that I can do it. I can go to Olympics. I got the spot for my country, and it’s such an honor to represent my nation. I don’t know, it seemed like something obstruct - the Olympics, something big, something out of this world. It’s a dream that came true. I have dreamed about it ever since I was a kid. It was more like an abstract dream that okay, someday I wanna be at the Olympics, and now it’s a reality."

He subsequently competed at the 2025 CS Trialeti Trophy but was forced to withdraw before the free skate due to suffering from food poisoning.

In November, Marsak won the silver medal at the 2025 Volvo Open Cup and finished fifth at the 2025 CS Tallinn Trophy. Two months later, he competed at the 2026 European Championships in Sheffield, England, United Kingdom, where he scored personal bests in all three competition segments and finished in eighth place overall. He expressed elation with the result, saying, "I didn’t expect this. I’m just proud of myself that I could pull it together. I wasn’t even hoping for the top 10, but it just happened and it’s amazing. I’m so happy about it, to have a bigger team at Europeans next year." One week later, he won gold at the 2026 Merano Ice Trophy.

Going into the 2026 Winter Olympics, Marsak protested Individual Neutral Athletes's participation at the upcoming Olympics because of the ongoing Russo-Ukrainian war. "All the buildings that had meaning in my life, especially in Kherson, they are destroyed! The skating rink is destroyed to pieces and my apartment is also the bomb came like one floor under!" he shared. "Even under 'neutral' status they should not be allowed. Most of them are supporting this war secretly and there is even proof but IOC was not paying attention to it unfortunately. How you can say that the sport is out of the politics? They are representing their country, they're representing their flag. That is directly the politics." Following this statement, Marsak shared, "I received a lot of messages from Russians saying that I'm not worthy enough and I shouldn't be here [at the Olympics]. But I was like, okay, whatever. Let's talk on the ice."

On 10 February, Marsak competed in the short program, where he scored a personal best by almost ten points and placed eleventh in that segment. "It was unbelievable," he shared following his short program. "I was in the moment, I was feeling every beat. I was so happy that I could do all these jumps and all these other elements. The step sequence is so good, it's just so cool." Due to them placing eleventh and twelfth, respectively, Marsak was required to skate after Individual Neutral Athlete, Petr Gumennik, a move that was widely criticized by skating fans. Two days later, Marsak struggled throughout his free skate, placing twenty-third in that segment and falling to nineteenth overall. While waiting for his scores in the kiss and cry area, Gumennik was seated about ten feet away from him in the leader's chair, a decision that was also criticized.

Following his free skate performance, Marsak shared, "I was trying to fight until the end, but unfortunately I think pressure was too high for me today and I couldn’t handle it. Even the practice today was extremely shaky. I was extremely nervous in practice, and I couldn’t bring myself back for the competition... The short program had no role in this unsuccessful free skate. I would say there was just too much negative information during this last couple of days, with the disqualification of Vladyslav Heraskevych and with all the International Olympic Committee situation. I guess it was just too much for me to handle, especially since we also had to compete right after the neutral athlete. That also played a role."

In March, Marsak completed his season at the 2026 World Championships. He placed twelfth in the short program and sixteenth in the free skate, finishing thirteenth overall. He set a new personal best in the total score with 234.67 points.

In April, he defended his national title, making this his fourth gold national championship medal.

=== 2026–27 season ===
Marsak opened the new season by winning the silver medal at the 2026 Tallinn Open. He subsequently competed on the ISU Challenger Series, competing at both Lombardia Trophy and Trialeti Trophy, placing fourth and fifth respectively.

In October, Marsak competed on the Grand Prix series at the 2026 Skate Canada where he finished fifth overall.

== Programs ==
Season	Short program	Free skating
2026–2027	Where's My Love (Piano Solo); Where is My Love (Alternate Version) by SYML choreo. by Ekaterina Ivleva Guarise	Euphoria; I'm Tired (Long Version); I'm Tired (Bonus Track); The Feels by Labrinth & Zendaya choreo. by Ekaterina Ivleva Guarise
2025–2026	Fall on Me by Andrea Bocelli & Matteo Bocelli choreo. by Ekaterina Ivleva Guarise	Euphoria; I'm Tired (Long Version); I'm Tired (Bonus Track); The Feels by Labrinth & Zendaya choreo. by Ekaterina Ivleva Guarise
2024–2025	Earth Song by Michael Jackson, David Foster, & Bill Bottrell choreo. by Monica Lindfors; To Build a Home by The Cinematic Orchestra choreo. by Monica Lindfors	Ghost; Unchained Melody (Dance) by Alex North & Hy Zaret performed by Richard Fleeshman & Caissie Levy; The Love Inside; Sam's Murder by Dave Stewart, Glen Ballard, & Bruce Joel Rubin performed by Richard Fleeshman & Caissie Levy choreo. by Monica Lindfors
2023–2024	Pale Yellow by Woodkid choreo. by Monica Lindfors	Flight (from Man of Steel) by Hans Zimmer; Everybody Knows (from Justice League) by Leonard Cohen performed by David Diaz; A Dark Knight (from The Dark Knight) by Hans Zimmer & James Newton Howard choreo. by Monica Lindfors
2022–2023	Pale Yellow by Woodkid choreo. by Monica Lindfors	Star Wars by John Williams & Samuel Kim; The Imperial March - Anakin's Suffering; Duel of the Fates choreo. by Adam Solya
2021–2022	Runaway by The Overtones & Del Shannon choreo. by Oleksii Oliinyk	The Flash: Main Theme by Bader Nana choreo. by Oleksii Oliinyk

== Competitive highlights ==
- JGP – Event of the ISU Junior Grand Prix Series
- CS – Event of the ISU Challenger Series
- TBD – Assigned
- WD – Withdrew from competition

Competition placements at senior level
Season	2018–19	2019–20	2020–21	2021–22	2022–23	2023–24	2024–25	2025–26	2026-27
Winter Olympics								19th	
World Championships					25th		33rd	13th	
European Championships					21st			8th	
Ukrainian Championships	8th	6th	5th	3rd	1st	1st	1st	1st	
GP Finland									TBD
GP Skate Canada									5th
CS Denis Ten Memorial						11th	6th		
CS Finlandia Trophy					18th	15th			
CS Lombardia Trophy								10th	4th
CS Tallinn Trophy					3rd	3rd	15th	5th	
CS Trialeti Trophy								WD	5th
CS Warsaw Cup					18th	15th	5th		
Bavarian Open					3rd	11th			
Merano Ice Trophy								1st	
Road to 26 Trophy							8th		
Skate to Milano								4th	
Tallink Hotels Cup						4th			
Tallinn Open									2nd
Volvo Open Cup					3rd		1st	2nd	
Winter University Games							25th		

Competition placements at junior level
Season	2021–22	2022–23	2023–24
World Junior Championships	33rd	15th	23rd
Ukrainian Championships	1st		
JGP Latvia		9th	
JGP Turkey			14th
European Youth Olympic Festival	15th		
Jégvirág Cup	3rd		
Latvia Trophy		1st	
Petrenko Cup	4th		
Volvo Open Cup			1st

== Detailed results ==
ISU personal best scores in the +5/-5 GOE System
Segment	Type	Score	Event
Total	TSS	237.53	2026 CS Lombardia Trophy
Short program	TSS	86.89	2026 Winter Olympics
Short program	TES	49.20	2026 Winter Olympics
Short program	PCS	37.69	2026 Winter Olympics
Free skating	TSS	159.37	2026 CS Lombardia Trophy
Free skating	TES	84.30	2026 European Championships
Free skating	PCS	75.09	2026 CS Lombardia Trophy

=== Senior level ===
Results in the 2018–19 season
Date	Event	SP		FS		Total	
Date	Event	P	Score	P	Score	P	Score
17–20 Dec 2018	(Ukraine) 2019 Ukrainian Championships	8	36.80	5	90.50	8	127.30

Results in the 2019–20 season
Date	Event	SP		FS		Total	
Date	Event	P	Score	P	Score	P	Score
17–19 Dec 2019	(Ukraine) 2020 Ukrainian Championships	5	55.78	6	96.01	6	151.79

Results in the 2020–21 season
Date	Event	SP		FS		Total	
Date	Event	P	Score	P	Score	P	Score
23–24 Feb 2021	(Ukraine) 2021 Ukrainian Championships	5	56.40	5	102.97	5	159.37

Results in the 2021–22 season
Date	Event	SP		FS		Total	
Date	Event	P	Score	P	Score	P	Score
7–8 Dec 2021	(Ukraine) 2022 Ukrainian Championships	2	63.20	4	118.70	3	181.90

Results in the 2022–23 season
Date	Event	SP		FS		Total	
Date	Event	P	Score	P	Score	P	Score
5–9 Oct 2022	(Finland) 2022 CS Finlandia Trophy	16	62.09	19	90.07	18	152.16
3–4 Nov 2022	(Latvia) 47th Volvo Open Cup	3	66.02	3	128.03	3	194.05
17–20 Nov 2022	(Poland) 2022 CS Warsaw Cup	20	59.36	17	120.61	18	179.97
24–27 Nov 2022	(Estonia) 2022 Tallinn Trophy	1	65.01	3	116.06	3	181.07
23–29 Jan 2023	(Finland) 2023 European Championships	17	70.41	22	111.57	21	181.98
31 Jan – 5 Feb 2023	(Germany) 2023 Bavarian Open	3	68.23	3	122.65	3	190.89
8–9 Apr 2023	(Ukraine) 2023 Ukrainian Championships	1	77.32	1	133.14	1	210.46
22–26 Mar 2023	(Japan) 2023 World Championships	25	68.60	—N/a	—N/a	25	68.60

Results in the 2023–24 season
Date	Event	SP		FS		Total	
Date	Event	P	Score	P	Score	P	Score
4–8 Oct 2023	(Finland) 2023 CS Finlandia Trophy	12	67.90	16	97.85	15	165.75
2–5 Nov 2023	(Kazakhstan) 2023 CS Denis Ten Memorial Challenge	5	72.31	13	100.33	11	172.64
16–19 Nov 2023	(Poland) 2023 CS Warsaw Cup	15	62.79	16	121.36	15	184.15
21–24 Nov 2023	(Estonia) 2023 Tallinn Trophy	1	68.01	3	125.22	3	193.23

Results in the 2024–25 season
Date	Event	SP		FS		Total	
Date	Event	P	Score	P	Score	P	Score
3–5 Oct 2024	(Kazakhstan) 2024 CS Denis Ten Memorial Challenge	10	62.33	5	146.95	6	209.28
31 Oct – 3 Nov 2024	(Latvia) 2024 Volvo Open Cup	1	74.96	1	146.91	1	221.87
11–17 Nov 2024	(Estonia) 2024 CS Tallinn Trophy	14	64.28	15	120.48	15	184.76
20–24 Nov 2024	(Poland) 2024 CS Warsaw Cup	8	64.72	3	140.66	5	205.38
16–18 Jan 2025	(Italy) 2025 Winter World University Games	25	55.58	—N/a	—N/a	25	55.58
18–20 Feb 2025	(Italy) Road to 26 Trophy	6	75.31	10	122.02	8	197.33
25–30 Mar 2025	(United States) 2025 World Championships	33	64.37	—N/a	—N/a	33	64.37
16–19 Apr 2025	(Ukraine) 2025 Ukrainian Championships	1	77.65	1	129.43	1	207.08

Results in the 2025–26 season
Date	Event	SP		FS		Total	
Date	Event	P	Score	P	Score	P	Score
11–14 Sep 2025	(Italy) 2025 CS Lombardia Trophy	11	75.35	8	147.85	10	223.20
18–21 Sep 2025	(China) 2025 ISU Skate to Milano	6	72.13	4	145.24	4	217.57
8–11 Oct 2025	(Georgia (country)) 2025 CS Trialeti Trophy	11	68.79	—N/a	—N/a	WD	—N/a
5–9 Nov 2025	(Latvia) 2025 Volvo Open Cup	2	75.51	2	144.86	2	220.37
25–30 Nov 2025	(Estonia) 2025 CS Tallinn Trophy	5	75.29	6	145.96	5	221.25
13–18 Jan 2026	(United Kingdom) 2026 European Championships	11	76.92	6	152.33	8	229.25
22–25 Jan 2026	(Italy) 2026 Merano Ice Trophy	1	78.21	1	176.17	1	254.38
10–13 Feb 2026	(Italy) 2026 Winter Olympics	11	86.89	23	137.28	19	224.17
24–29 Mar 2026	(Czech Republic) 2026 World Championships	12	83.36	16	151.31	13	234.67
8–11 Apr 2026	(Ukraine) 2026 Ukrainian Championships	1	83.09	1	153.56	1	236.65

Results in the 2026–27 season
Date	Event	SP		FS		Total	
Date	Event	P	Score	P	Score	P	Score
11–13 Sep 2026	(Estonia) 2026 Tallinn Open	3	75.51	1	144.46	2	219.97
17–20 Sep 2026	(Italy) 2026 CS Lombardia Trophy	6	78.16	3	159.37	4	237.53
1–4 Oct 2026	(Georgia (country)) 2026 CS Trialeti Trophy	6	71.07	4	145.54	5	216.61
30 Oct – 1 Nov 2026	2026 Skate Canada International	4	83.67	6	142.73	5	226.40

=== Junior level ===
2023–24 season
Date	Event	SP	FS	Total
26 February – 3 March 2024	2024 World Junior Championships	18; 64.29	22; 116.13	23; 180.42
30 January – 4 February 2024	2024 Bavarian Open	11; 63.79	10; 123.27	11; 187.06
18–21 January 2024	2024 Volvo Open Cup	3; 63.24	1; 123.71	1; 186.95
6–8 September 2023	2023 JGP Turkey	21; 47.08	10; 112.91	14; 159.99
2022–23 season
Date	Event	SP	FS	Total
27 February – 5 March 2023	2023 World Junior Championships	15; 65.55	15; 126.10	15; 191.65
16–18 December 2022	2022 Latvia Trophy	1; 63.81	1; 121.66	1; 185.47
7–10 September 2022	2022 JGP Latvia	8; 58.94	9; 115.16	9; 174.10
2021–22 season
Date	Event	SP	FS	Total
13–17 April 2022	2022 World Junior Championships	33; 44.71	–	33; 44.71
11–13 February 2022	2022 Jégvirág Cup	3; 50.92	3; 88.21	3; 139.13
31 January – 5 February 2022	2022 European Youth Olympic Winter Festival	10; 50.89	16; 75.57	15; 126.46
25–27 January 2022	2022 Ukrainian Junior Championships	1; 65.42	1; 125.83	1; 191.25
20–23 October 2021	2021 Petrenko Cup	1; 61.93	5; 88.77	4; 150.70
