= 2025 CS Tallinn Trophy =

International figure skating competition

2025 Tallinn Trophy
- Type: ISU Challenger Series
- Date: 25 – 30 November
- Season: 2025–26
- Location: Tallinn, Estonia
- Host: Estonian Skating Union
- Venue: Tondiraba Ice Hall

Champions
- Men's singles: (Estonia) Aleksandr Selevko
- Women's singles: (Finland) Olivia Lisko
- Ice dance: (Spain) Olivia Smart and Tim Dieck
- Previous: 2024 CS Tallinn Trophy
- Previous CS: 2025 CS Warsaw Cup
- Next CS: 2025 CS Golden Spin of Zagreb

The 2025 Tallinn Trophy is a figure skating competition sanctioned by the International Skating Union (ISU), organized and hosted by the Estonian Skating Union, and the tenth event of the 2025–26 ISU Challenger Series. It was held at the Tondiraba Ice Hall in Tallinn, Estonia, from 25 to 30 November 2025. Medals were awarded in men's singles, women's singles, and ice dance, and skaters earned ISU World Standing points based on their results. Aleksandr Selevko of Estonia won the men's event, Olivia Lisko of Finland won the women's event, and Olivia Smart and Tim Dieck of Spain won the ice dance event.

== Background ==
The Tallinn Trophy debuted in 2002 as a regional competition, and became an international competition in 2011. The ISU Challenger Series was introduced in 2014. It is a series of international figure skating competitions sanctioned by the International Skating Union (ISU) and organized by ISU member nations. The objective was to ensure consistent organization and structure within a series of international competitions linked together, providing opportunities for senior-level skaters to compete at the international level and also earn ISU World Standing points. The Tallinn Trophy was a Challenger Series event from 2015 through 2018, and again in 2024. Due to the COVID-19 pandemic, the 2020 Tallinn Trophy was held exclusively for skaters in Estonia.

The 2025–26 Challenger Series consists of eleven events, of which the Tallinn Trophy was the tenth. The International Skating Union published the initial list of entrants on 12 November 2025.

== Required performance elements ==
=== Single skating ===
Men and women competing in single skating first performed their short programs on Thursday, 27 November. Lasting no more than 2 minutes 40 seconds, the short program had to include the following elements:

For men: one double or triple Axel; one triple or quadruple jump; one jump combination consisting of a double jump and a triple jump, two triple jumps, or a quadruple jump and a double jump or triple jump; one flying spin; one camel spin or sit spin with a change of foot; one spin combination with a change of foot; and a step sequence using the full ice surface.

For women: one double or triple Axel; one triple jump; one jump combination consisting of a double jump and a triple jump, or two triple jumps; one flying spin; one layback spin, sideways leaning spin, camel spin, or sit spin without a change of foot; one spin combination with a change of foot; and one step sequence using the full ice surface.

Men and women performed their free skates on Friday, 28 November. The free skate performance for both men and women could last no more than 4 minutes, and had to include the following: seven jump elements, of which one had to be an Axel-type jump; three spins, of which one had to be a spin combination, one had to be a flying spin, and one had to be a spin with only one position; a step sequence; and a choreographic sequence.

=== Ice dance ===
Couples competing in ice dance performed their rhythm dances on Saturday, 29 November. Lasting no more than 2 minutes 50 seconds, the theme of the rhythm dance this season was "music, dance styles, and feeling of the 1990s". Examples of applicable dance styles and music included, but were not limited to: pop, Latin, house, techno, hip-hop, and grunge. The rhythm dance had to include the following elements: one pattern dance step sequence, one choreographic rhythm sequence, one dance lift, one set of sequential twizzles, and one step sequence.

Couples then performed their free dances on Sunday, 30 November. The free dance performance could last no longer than 4 minutes, and had to include the following: three dance lifts, one dance spin, one set of synchronized twizzles, one step sequence in hold, one step sequence while on one skate and not touching, and three choreographic elements.

== Judging ==
Skaters were judged according to the required technical elements of their program (such as jumps and spins), as well as the overall presentation of their program, based on three program components (skating skills, presentation, and composition). Each technical element in a figure skating performance was assigned a predetermined base point value and scored by a panel of nine judges on a scale from −5 to +5 based on the quality of its execution. Each Grade of Execution (GOE) from –5 to +5 was assigned a value as indicated on the Scale of Values. For example, a triple Axel was worth a base value of 8.00 points, and a GOE of +3 was worth 2.40 points, so a triple Axel with a GOE of +3 earned 10.40 points. The judging panel's GOE for each element was determined by calculating the trimmed mean (the average after discarding the highest and lowest scores). The panel's scores for all elements were added together to generate a Total Elements Score. At the same time, the judges evaluated each performance based on the five aforementioned program components and assigned each a score from 0.25 to 10 in 0.25-point increments. The judging panel's final score for each program component was also determined by calculating the trimmed mean. Those scores were then multiplied by the factor shown on the chart below; the results were added together to generate a total Program Component Score.

Program component factoring
Discipline	Short program or Rhythm dance	Free skate or Free dance
Men	1.67	3.33
Women	1.33	2.67
Ice dance	1.33	2.00

Deductions were applied for certain violations, such as time infractions, stops and restarts, or falls. The Total Elements Score and Program Component Score were then added together, minus any deductions, to generate a final performance score for each skater or team.

== Medal summary ==
Medalists
Discipline	Gold	Silver	Bronze
Men	(Estonia) Aleksandr Selevko	(Italy) Matteo Rizzo	(Estonia) Arlet Levandi
Women	(Finland) Olivia Lisko	(United States) Sarah Everhardt	(United States) Alina Bonillo
Ice dance	(Spain); Olivia Smart; Tim Dieck	(Germany); Jennifer Janse van Rensburg; Benjamin Steffan	(Czech Republic); Natálie Taschlerová; Filip Taschler

== Results ==
=== Men's singles ===
Men's results
Rank	Skater	Nation	Total points	SP		FS	
1st place, gold medalist(s)	Aleksandr Selevko	Estonia	237.67	1	84.74	2	152.93
2nd place, silver medalist(s)	Matteo Rizzo	Italy	231.45	2	78.23	1	153.22
3rd place, bronze medalist(s)	Arlet Levandi	Estonia	228.52	3	77.45	3	151.07
4	Maxim Naumov	United States	223.04	7	74.53	4	148.51
5	Kyrylo Marsak	Ukraine	221.25	5	75.29	6	145.96
6	Genrikh Gartung	Germany	216.65	6	75.08	7	141.57
7	Corey Circelli	Italy	212.41	11	64.84	5	147.57
8	Liam Kapeikis	United States	211.74	4	75.88	9	135.86
9	Tomàs-Llorenç Guarino Sabaté	Spain	205.69	9	67.96	8	137.73
10	Georgii Reshtenko	Czech Republic	191.36	8	74.03	18	117.33
11	Ean Weiler	Switzerland	190.93	16	62.08	11	128.85
12	Nikita Starostin	Germany	190.92	18	61.07	10	129.85
13	Makar Suntsev	Finland	188.05	10	65.22	12	122.83
14	Davide Lewton Brain	Monaco	185.59	12	64.37	13	121.22
15	Nico Steffen	Switzerland	183.36	13	63.90	17	119.46
16	Tobia Oellerer	Austria	180.99	17	61.27	15	119.72
17	Valtter Virtanen	Finland	179.36	19	58.06	14	120.71
18	Hugo Bostedt	Sweden	177.56	20	58.06	16	119.50
19	Xavier Vauclin	France	174.64	15	62.12	20	112.52
20	Alexander Zlatkov	Bulgaria	167.56	14	62.35	21	105.21
21	Noah Bodenstein	Switzerland	166.19	21	52.82	19	113.37
22	Gabriel Martínez	Ecuador	139.79	22	49.13	22	90.66
23	Adrian Jiménez de Baldomero	Spain	136.51	23	47.10	23	89.41

=== Women's singles ===
Women's results
Rank	Skater	Nation	Total points	SP		FS	
1st place, gold medalist(s)	Olivia Lisko	Finland	196.23	1	67.47	1	128.76
2nd place, silver medalist(s)	Sarah Everhardt	United States	184.88	2	66.83	4	118.05
3rd place, bronze medalist(s)	Alina Bonillo	United States	183.59	4	61.10	2	122.49
4	Niina Petrõkina	Estonia	178.61	5	58.86	3	119.75
5	Starr Andrews	United States	178.40	3	66.33	5	112.07
6	Chiara Minighini	Italy	164.55	6	57.55	6	107.00
7	Josefin Taljegård	Sweden	158.14	8	55.09	7	103.05
8	Kristina Lisovskaja	Estonia	154.70	7	55.38	9	99.32
9	Julia Grabowski	Germany	151.16	9	51.08	8	100.08
10	Elena Agostinelli	Italy	148.62	11	50.52	11	98.10
11	Anna Grekul	Germany	145.73	15	47.39	10	98.34
12	Clémence Mayindu	France	139.75	17	47.15	12	92.60
13	Minja Peltonen	Finland	139.74	13	48.45	13	91.29
14	Livia Kaiser	Switzerland	137.38	10	50.80	14	86.58
15	Janna Jyrkinen	Finland	131.70	16	47.18	16	84.32
16	Angelīna Kučvaļska	Latvia	131.32	12	49.00	18	82.32
17	Ksenija Heimane	Latvia	130.50	18	46.98	17	83.52
18	Olesja Leonova	Estonia	129.26	20	44.30	15	84.96
19	Alexandra Odman	Sweden	117.86	23	38.51	19	79.35
20	Nikola Fomchenkova	Latvia	115.44	19	44.36	21	71.08
21	Sofiia Hryhorenko	Ukraine	112.67	22	39.44	20	73.23
22	Karoliine Raudsepp	Estonia	112.16	14	48.23	23	63.93
23	Ina Jungmann	Germany	105.97	21	40.62	22	65.35
WD	Marianne Must	Estonia	Withdrew	24	30.03	Withdrew from competition	
WD	Michelle DiCicco	Argentina	Withdrew	25	25.70	Withdrew from competition	

=== Ice dance ===
Ice dance results
Rank	Team	Nation	Total points	RD		FD	
1st place, gold medalist(s)	Olivia Smart; Tim Dieck	Spain	192.67	4	73.03	1	119.64
2nd place, silver medalist(s)	Jennifer Janse van Rensburg; Benjamin Steffan	Germany	192.31	2	75.45	2	116.86
3rd place, bronze medalist(s)	Natálie Taschlerová; Filip Taschler	Czech Republic	191.00	1	77.35	3	113.65
4	Eva Pate; Logan Bye	United States	182.81	3	74.03	5	108.78
5	Sofía Val; Asaf Kazimov	Spain	181.45	5	70.59	4	110.86
6	Natacha Lagouge; Arnaud Caffa	France	175.02	6	69.31	6	105.71
7	Victoria Manni; Carlo Röthlisberger	Italy	171.43	7	68.32	7	103.11
8	Carolane Soucisse; Shane Firus	Ireland	167.55	8	64.56	8	102.99
9	Amy Cui; Jonathan Rogers	United States	160.01	12	60.01	9	100.00
10	Gina Zehnder; Beda Leon Sieber	Switzerland	154.42	9	61.69	11	92.73
11	Lilia Schubert; Nikita Remeshevskiy	Germany	153.58	13	60.00	10	93.58
12	Laura Finelli; Massimiliano Bucciarelli	Italy	150.54	10	60.20	12	90.34
13	Arianna Sassi; Luca Morini	Switzerland	147.67	11	60.02	13	87.65
14	Carlotta ArgenteriI; Francesco Riva	Italy	139.65	14	54.04	14	85.61

== Works cited ==
- "Special Regulations & Technical Rules – Single & Pair Skating and Ice Dance 2024" (PDF). International Skating Union. Archived (PDF) from the original on 3 June 2025.
