= Olivia Lisko =

Finnish figure skater (born 2006)

Personal information
- Born: 18 May 2006 (age 20) Turku, Finland
- Home town: Helsinki, Finland
- Height: 1.66 m (5 ft 5 1/2 in)

Figure skating career
- Country: Finland
- Discipline: Women's singles
- Coach: Virpi Horttana
- Skating club: Espoon Jäätaiturit
- Began skating: 2009

Medal record
Finnish Championships
| Gold medal – first place | 2025 Rauma | Singles |
| Silver medal – second place | 2024 Helsinki | Singles |
| Silver medal – second place | 2026 Lahti | Singles |

Olivia Lisko (born 18 May 2006) is a Finnish figure skater. She is the 2025 CS Tallinn Trophy champion, the 2025 Nordic Championships champion, and the 2024 Finnish national champion.

== Personal life ==
Lisko was born on 18 May 2006 in Turku, Finland. She has three younger siblings, Aurora, Alvar, and Iiris, who are also skaters.

== Career ==
=== 2019–20 season: Junior debut ===
Lisko competed at the junior level during the 2019–20 figure skating season, winning two international bronze medals at the 2019 Halloween Cup at the 2020 Nordic Championships. At the 2020 Finnish Championships, Lisko placed third in the short program and second in the free skate, placing second overall.

=== 2020–21 season ===
Lisko did not compete during the 2020–21 season due to the COVID-19 pandemic. During the season, she began training to land a triple axel.

=== 2021–22 season: Senior international debut ===
Lisko began the season by competing at the 2021–22 Junior Grand Prix series, finishing eleventh at the 2021 JGP Slovakia and tenth at the 2021 JGP Slovenia, before going on to finish third at the 2021 Tallinn Trophy.

Lisko would then go on to compete at the 2022 Finnish Championships, placing fifth at the senior level.

During the second half of the season, Lisko made her senior international debut at the 2022 Bavarian Open, placing sixth. She next competed at the 2022 Nordic Championships, winning the bronze medal, and the 2022 Jégvirág Cup, where she won the silver medal.

Lisko finished her season at the 2022 European Youth Olympic Winter Festival, where she won the silver medal.

=== 2022–23 season ===
During the 2022–23 figure skating season, Lisko competed fully at the senior level. She began the season by competing at the 2022 Tirnavia Ice Cup and 2022 NRW Trophy, placing seventh and fifth respectively. At the 2023 Finnish Championships, Lisko placed second in the short program and fourth in the free skate, finishing fourth overall and missing the podium by less than a point.

Lisko next competed at the 2023 Volvo Open Cup and 2023 Nordic Championships, winning the bronze medal at both competitions.

=== 2023–24 season ===
Lisko opened the 2023–24 figure skating season at the 2023 Jelgava Cup, placing ninth. Lisko competed at her first ISU Challenger Series competition at the 2023 CS Budapest Trophy, finishing seventeenth. She then competed at the 2023 Swiss Open, winning the bronze medal, then the 2023 CS Warsaw Cup, placing eleventh with a new personal best score of 149.21.

At the 2024 Finnish Championships, Lisko placed first in the short program and third in the free skate, finishing second overall. This marked her first senior national championship medal. At the 2024 Nordic Championships, Lisko once again won the bronze medal.

=== 2024–25 season: Finnish national champion ===
Lisko began the season by competing on the 2024–25 ISU Challenger Series circuit, finishing fourteenth at the 2024 CS Nebelhorn Trophy and eighth at the 2024 CS Trophée Métropole Nice Côte d'Azur, earning a personal best score of 152.79 at the latter competition. She followed these results up with a second-place finish at the 2024 Volvo Open Cup.

Lisko made her ISU Grand Prix debut at the 2024 Finlandia Trophy after being selected as a host pick alongside Janna Jyrkinen. Lisko finished the event in twelfth place.

In December, she won her first national title at the 2025 Finnish Championships after winning both the short program and free skate. Lisko would go on to medal at every event she competed in during the rest of the season. Lisko won gold at both the 2025 Volvo Open Cup and 2025 Nordic Championships, bronze at the 2025 Bellu Memorial, and silver at the 2025 Sonja Henie Memorial.

=== 2025–26 season: Challenger Series gold ===
Lisko began her season on the 2025–26 ISU Challenger Series circuit, finishing seventh at the 2025 CS Lombardia Trophy and 13th at the 2025 CS Trialeti Trophy. Her score of 173.95 at the Lombardia Trophy marked a 20-point improvement upon her previous personal best score. At the 2025 Swiss Open, Lisko won the silver medal.

Lisko was once again selected as a host pick to the Finnish Grand Prix event. At the 2025 Finlandia Trophy, Lisko placed seventh in the short program and ninth in the free skate, finishing ninth overall with a score of 164.67. The next week, Lisko competed at the 2025 CS Tallinn Trophy, where she placed first in both the short program and free skate, finishing first overall and winning her first ISU Challenger Series title. Her final score of 196.23 incresaed her personal best score by over 20 points yet again.

At the 2026 Finnish Championships, Lisko placed first in the short program and second in the free skate, finishing second overall behind Iida Karhunen. In January, she won the silver medal at the 2026 Sofia Trophy, gold at the 2026 Crystal Skate of Romania, and bronze at the 2026 Nordic Championships. In March, she won the gold medal at the 2026 Sonja Henie Trophy.

=== 2026–27 season ===
Lisko shared that she had been recovering from an injury during the off season and that her main goal for the new season is to debut at the European Championships.

Lisko opened the season with a 10th-place finish at the 2026 CS Lombardia Trophy.

In late October, Lisko announced that she withdrew from her two Grand Prix assignments (NHK and Finlandia) due to a stress fracture in her lower back. Lisko shared via her Instagram page, "I’ve been struggling with a back injury since Lombardia Trophy, and just a week after competing there, I was diagnosed with a stress fracture in my lower back. I’ve been hoping to recover in time for the upcoming competitions but it has become clear that I need to give my body more time to heal properly. Unfortunately, I’ve made the decision to take a step back from competing and spend some time away from the ice to focus on my recovery."

== Programs ==
| Season | Short program | Free skating |
|---|---|---|
| 2026–2027 | "Moulin Rouge": El Tango de Roxanne by Sting, Baz Luhrman | Across the Stars (from Star Wars: Episode II – Attack of the Clones) Julian Riem & John Williams choreo. by Sari Hakola |
| 2025–2026 | I Knew I Loved You by Le Muse choreo. by Sari Hakola | Across the Stars (from Star Wars: Episode II – Attack of the Clones) Julian Riem & John Williams choreo. by Sari Hakola |
| 2024–2025 | I Knew I Loved You by Le Muse choreo. by Sari Hakola | Invierno Porteño by Astor Piazzolla performed by Gidon Kremer & Kremerata Baltica choreo. by Sari Hakola |
| 2023–2024 | Stairway to Heaven by Led Zeppelin performed by Rodrigo y Gabriela choreo. by Sari Hakola | Invierno Porteño by Astor Piazzolla performed by Gidon Kremer & Kremerata Baltica choreo. by Sari Hakola |
| 2022–2023 | I Love Paris by Mathieu Boogaerts & Cole Porter choreo. by Sari Hakola | Fantasy for Violin and Orchestra on Porgy and Bess by George Gershwin performed by John Williams, Joshua Bell, & London Symphony Orchestra choreo. by Sari Hakola |
| 2021–2022 | I Love Paris by Mathieu Boogaerts & Cole Porter choreo. by Sari Hakola | Fantasy for Violin and Orchestra on Porgy and Bess by George Gershwin performed by John Williams, Joshua Bell, & London Symphony Orchestra choreo. by Sari Hakola |

== Competitive highlights ==
- GP – Event of the ISU Grand Prix Series
- JGP – Event of the ISU Junior Grand Prix Series
- CS – Event of the ISU Challenger Series
- WD – Withdrew from competition
- C – Event was cancelled

Competition placements at senior level
| Season | 2021-22 | 2022–23 | 2023–24 | 2024–25 | 2025–26 | 2026–27 |
|---|---|---|---|---|---|---|
| Finnish Championships | 5th | 4th | 2nd | 1st | 2nd | |
| GP Finland | | | | 12th | 9th | |
| CS Lombardia Trophy | | | | | 7th | 10th |
| CS Nebelhorn Trophy | | | | 14th | | |
| CS Tallinn Trophy | | | | | 1st | |
| CS Trialeti Trophy | | | | | 13th | |
| CS Trophée Métropole Nice | | | | 8th | | |
| CS Warsaw Cup | | | 11th | | | |
| CS Budapest Trophy | | | 17th | | | |
| Bellu Memorial | | | | 3rd | | |
| Challenge Cup | | 11th | | | | |
| Crystal Skate | | | | | 1st | |
| Jégvirág Cup | 2nd | | | | | |
| Nordic Championships | 3rd | 3rd | 3rd | 1st | 3rd | |
| NRW Trophy | | 5th | | | | |
| Sofia Trophy | | | | | 2nd | |
| Sonja Henie Trophy | | | 4th | 2nd | 1st | |
| Swiss Open | | | 3rd | | 2nd | |
| Tallink Hotels Cup | | 4th | | | 1st | |
| Tallinn Trophy | 3rd | | | | | |
| Tirnavia Ice Cup | | 7th | | | | |
| Volvo Open Cup | | 3rd | 5th | 1st | | |
| Volvo Open Cup (Note: 52nd Volvo Cup Open) | | | | 2nd | | |
| Bavarian Open | 6th | | | | | |

Competition placements at junior level
| Season | 2019–20 | 2021–22 |
|---|---|---|
| Finnish Championships | 2nd | |
| JGP Slovakia | | 11th |
| JGP Slovenia | | 10th |
| Challenge Cup | 7th | |
| European Youth Olympic Festival | | 2nd |
| Halloween Cup | 3rd | |
| Mentor Toruń Cup | 10th | |
| Nordic Championships | 3rd | |
| Tallinn Trophy | 4th | |

== Detailed results ==
ISU personal best scores in the +5/-5 GOE System
| Segment | Type | Score | Event |
|---|---|---|---|
| Total | TSS | 196.23 | 2025 CS Tallinn Trophy |
| Short program | TSS | 67.47 | 2025 CS Tallinn Trophy |
| Short program | TES | 37.28 | 2025 CS Tallinn Trophy |
| Short program | PCS | 30.19 | 2025 CS Tallinn Trophy |
| Free skating | TSS | 128.76 | 2025 CS Tallinn Trophy |
| Free skating | TES | 65.08 | 2025 CS Tallinn Trophy |
| Free skating | PCS | 63.68 | 2025 CS Tallinn Trophy |

=== Senior level ===
Results in the 2021–22 season
| Date | Event | SP | | FS | | Total | |
| Date | Event | P | Score | P | Score | P | Score |
|---|---|---|---|---|---|---|---|
| Nov 16–21, 2021 | (Estonia) 2021 Tallinn Trophy | 2 | 55.27 | 4 | 98.94 | 3 | 154.21 |
| Dec 17–19, 2021 | (Finland) 2022 Finnish Championships | 5 | 50.90 | 5 | 95.84 | 5 | 146.74 |
| Jan 18–23, 2022 | (Germany) 2022 Bavarian Open | 7 | 52.34 | 6 | 98.76 | 6 | 151.10 |
| Jan 27–30, 2022 | (Denmark) 2022 Nordic Championships | 5 | 49.52 | 3 | 100.11 | 3 | 149.63 |
| Feb 11–13, 2022 | (Hungary) 2022 Jégvirág Cup | 4 | 52.49 | 1 | 113.89 | 2 | 166.38 |

Results in the 2022–23 season
| Date | Event | SP | | FS | | Total | |
| Date | Event | P | Score | P | Score | P | Score |
|---|---|---|---|---|---|---|---|
| Oct 28–29, 2022 | (Slovakia) 2022 Tirnavia Ice Cup | 2 | 53.16 | 7 | 77.40 | 7 | 130.56 |
| Nov 24–27, 2022 | (Germany) 2022 NRW Trophy | 2 | 56.45 | 7 | 83.58 | 5 | 140.03 |
| Dec 16–18, 2022 | (Finland) 2023 Finnish Championships | 2 | 55.26 | 4 | 100.40 | 4 | 155.66 |
| Jan 19–22, 2023 | (Latvia) 48th Volvo Open Cup | 2 | 57.74 | 3 | 113.56 | 3 | 171.30 |
| Feb 1–5, 2023 | (Iceland) 2023 Nordic Championships | 4 | 55.91 | 2 | 110.25 | 3 | 166.16 |
| Feb 16–19, 2023 | (Estonia) 2023 Tallink Hotels Cup | 5 | 57.40 | 4 | 102.70 | 4 | 160.10 |
| Feb 23–26, 2023 | (Netherlands) 2023 International Challenge Cup | 15 | 51.14 | 10 | 109.13 | 11 | 160.27 |

Results in the 2023–24 season
| Date | Event | SP | | FS | | Total | |
| Date | Event | P | Score | P | Score | P | Score |
|---|---|---|---|---|---|---|---|
| Sep 16–17, 2023 | (Latvia) 2023 Jelgava Cup | 6 | 46.78 | 9 | 81.06 | 9 | 127.84 |
| Oct 13–15, 2023 | (Hungary) 2023 CS Budapest Trophy | 17 | 50.34 | 19 | 90.85 | 17 | 141.19 |
| Oct 26–29, 2023 | (Switzerland) 2023 Swiss Open | 4 | 51.91 | 3 | 90.57 | 3 | 142.48 |
| Nov 16–19, 2023 | (Poland) 2023 CS Warsaw Cup | 8 | 53.89 | 13 | 95.32 | 11 | 149.21 |
| Dec 15–17, 2023 | (Finland) 2024 Finnish Championships | 1 | 61.67 | 3 | 110.11 | 2 | 171.78 |
| Jan 18–21, 2024 | (Latvia) 51st Volvo Open Cup | 7 | 44.78 | 5 | 83.45 | 5 | 128.23 |
| Feb 1–4, 2024 | (Sweden) 2024 Nordic Championships | 2 | 51.67 | 2 | 102.30 | 3 | 153.97 |
| Mar 8–10, 2024 | (Norway) 2024 Sonja Henje Trophy | 4 | 49.96 | 4 | 93.21 | 4 | 143.17 |

Results in the 2024–25 season
| Date | Event | SP | | FS | | Total | |
| Date | Event | P | Score | P | Score | P | Score |
|---|---|---|---|---|---|---|---|
| Sep 19–21, 2024 | (Germany) 2024 CS Nebelhorn Trophy | 12 | 50.74 | 14 | 85.63 | 14 | 136.37 |
| Oct 16–20, 2024 | (France) 2024 CS Trophée Métropole Nice Côte d'Azur | 14 | 48.08 | 6 | 104.71 | 8 | 152.79 |
| Oct 31 – Nov 3, 2024 | (Latvia) 52nd Volvo Open Cup | 3 | 55.53 | 1 | 102.70 | 2 | 158.23 |
| Nov 15–17, 2024 | (Finland) 2024 Finlandia Trophy | 10 | 54.68 | 12 | 98.99 | 12 | 153.67 |
| Dec 13–15, 2024 | (Finland) 2025 Finnish Championships | 1 | 62.10 | 1 | 107.83 | 1 | 169.93 |
| Jan 16–19, 2025 | (Latvia) 53rd Volvo Open Cup | 1 | 55.34 | 1 | 111.55 | 1 | 166.89 |
| Feb 6–9, 2025 | (Norway) 2025 Nordic Championships | 3 | 55.88 | 1 | 109.98 | 1 | 165.86 |
| Feb 18–23, 2025 | (Romania) 2025 Bellu Memorial | 5 | 54.96 | 3 | 109.30 | 3 | 164.26 |
| Mar 6–9, 2025 | (Norway) 2025 Sonja Henje Trophy | 1 | 60.18 | 2 | 114.04 | 2 | 174.22 |

Results in the 2025–26 season
| Date | Event | SP | | FS | | Total | |
| Date | Event | P | Score | P | Score | P | Score |
|---|---|---|---|---|---|---|---|
| Sep 11–14, 2025 | (Italy) 2025 CS Lombardia Trophy | 8 | 63.15 | 7 | 110.80 | 7 | 173.95 |
| Oct 8–11, 2025 | (Georgia (country)) 2025 CS Trialeti Trophy | 11 | 51.38 | 11 | 106.06 | 13 | 157.44 |
| Oct 23–26, 2025 | (Switzerland) 2025 Swiss Open | 3 | 58.41 | 3 | 112.99 | 2 | 171.40 |
| Nov 21–23, 2025 | (Finland) 2025 Finlandia Trophy | 7 | 61.00 | 9 | 103.67 | 9 | 164.67 |
| Nov 25–30, 2025 | (Estonia) 2025 CS Tallinn Trophy | 1 | 67.47 | 1 | 128.76 | 1 | 196.23 |
| Dec 12–14, 2025 | (Finland) 2026 Finnish Championships | 1 | 65.10 | 2 | 116.58 | 2 | 181.68 |
| Jan 6–11, 2026 | (Bulgaria) 2026 Sofia Trophy | 2 | 55.51 | 2 | 105.50 | 2 | 161.01 |
| Jan 14–18, 2026 | 2026 Crystal Skate of Romania | 1 | 55.60 | 1 | 99.22 | 1 | 154.82 |
| Jan 28 – Feb 1, 2026 | (Denmark) 2026 Nordic Championships | 2 | 54.56 | 3 | 110.51 | 3 | 165.07 |
| Feb 19-22, 2026 | (Estonia) 2026 Tallink Hotels Cup | 1 | 61.88 | 2 | 109.66 | 1 | 171.54 |
| Mar 5-8, 2026 | (Norway) 2026 Sonja Henie Trophy | 1 | 63.48 | 2 | 114.33 | 1 | 177.81 |

Results in the 2026–27 season
| Date | Event | SP | | FS | | Total | |
| Date | Event | P | Score | P | Score | P | Score |
|---|---|---|---|---|---|---|---|
| September 17–20, 2026 | (Italy) 2026 CS Lombardia Trophy | 6 | 58.65 | 9 | 99.10 | 10 | 157.75 |

=== Junior level ===
Results in the 2019–20 season
| Date | Event | SP | | FS | | Total | |
| Date | Event | P | Score | P | Score | P | Score |
|---|---|---|---|---|---|---|---|
| Oct 17–19, 2019 | (Hungary) 2019 Halloween Cup | 6 | 44.34 | 3 | 82.92 | 3 | 127.26 |
| Nov 11–17, 2019 | (Estonia) 2019 Tallinn Trophy | 6 | 44.34 | 4 | 85.84 | 3 | 130.32 |
| Dec 13–15, 2019 | (Finland) 2020 Finnish Junior Championships | 3 | 47.16 | 2 | 89.34 | 2 | 136.50 |
| Jan 7–12, 2020 | (Poland) 2020 Mentor Toruń Cup | 15 | 36.60 | 9 | 80.10 | 10 | 116.70 |
| Feb 5–9, 2020 | (Norway) 2020 Nordic Junior Championships | 13 | 38.69 | 3 | 82.28 | 3 | 120.97 |
| Feb 20–23, 2020 | (Netherlands) 2020 International Challenge Cup | 6 | 52.61 | 7 | 90.38 | 7 | 142.99 |

Results in the 2020–21 season
| Date | Event | SP | | FS | | Total | |
| Date | Event | P | Score | P | Score | P | Score |
|---|---|---|---|---|---|---|---|
| Sep 1–4, 2021 | 2021 JGP Slovakia | 17 | 43.21 | 11 | 88.67 | 11 | 131.88 |
| Sep 22–25, 2021 | 2021 JGP Slovenia | 11 | 49.93 | 10 | 96.28 | 10 | 146.21 |
| Mar 20–25, 2022 | (Finland) 2022 European Youth Olympic Winter Festival | 1 | 57.94 | 4 | 97.09 | 2 | 155.03 |
