= Edward Appleby =

English figure skater (born 2004)

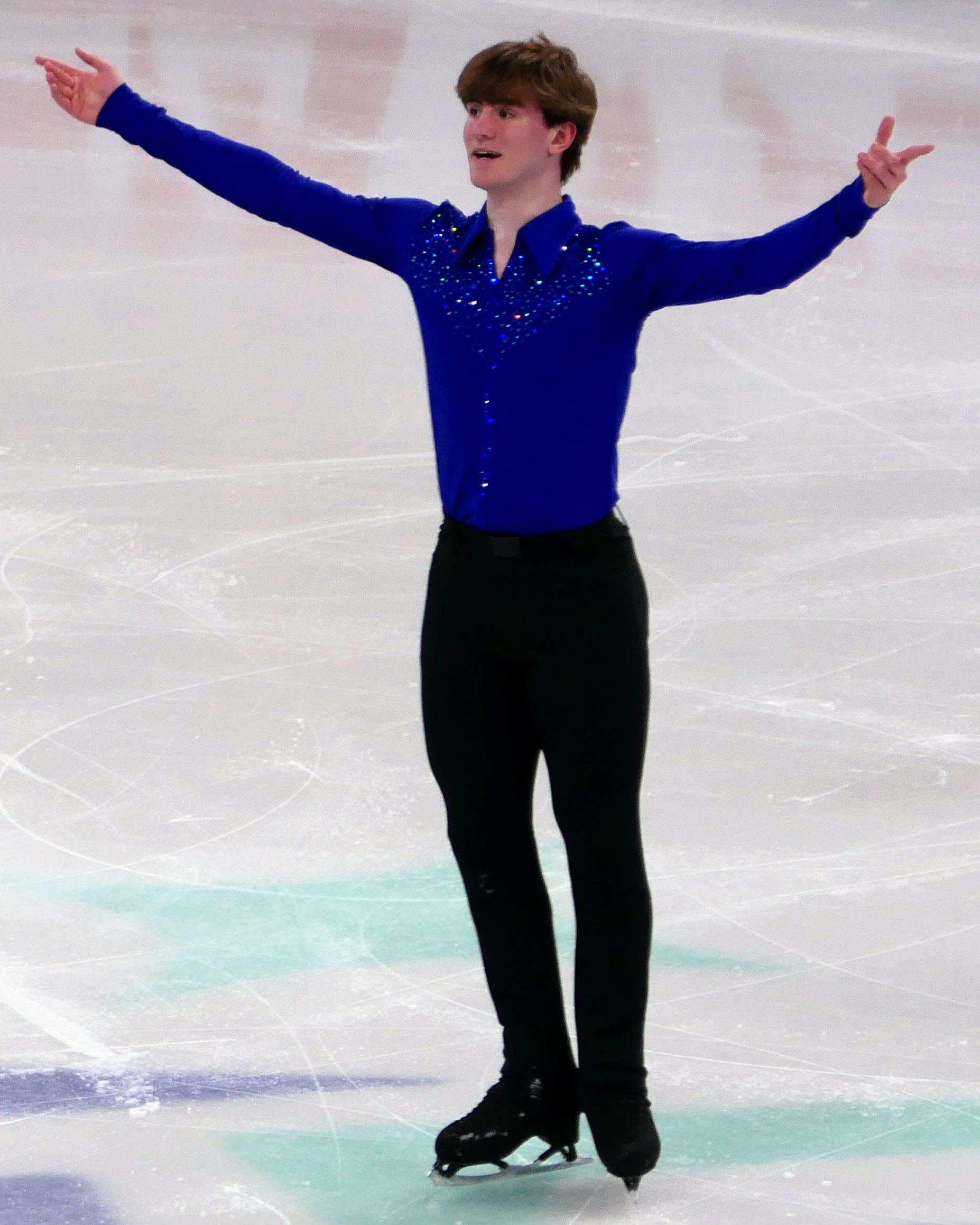
- Edward Appleby at the 2024 World Championships

Personal information
- Born: 21 December 2004 (age 21) Colchester, England, United Kingdom
- Home town: Wivenhoe, England
- Height: 1.83 m (6 ft 0 in)

Figure skating career
- Country: Great Britain
- Discipline: Men's singles
- Coach: Christopher Boyadji; Lloyd Jones; Zoe Jones
- Skating club: Romford Ice Arena
- Began skating: 2009

Medal record
British Championships
Gold medal – first place	2024 Sheffield	Singles
Gold medal – first place	2025 Sheffield	Singles
Gold medal – first place	2026 Sheffield	Singles
Silver medal – second place	2023 Sheffield	Singles

Edward Appleby (born 21 December 2004) is an English figure skater. He is a three-time British national champion. On the junior level, he is the 2021 JGP France II bronze medalist, 2020 Mentor Toruń Cup junior men's champion, and a two-time British junior national champion.

Appleby represented Great Britain at the 2026 Winter Olympics.

== Personal life ==
Edward Appleby was born on 21 December 2004 in Colchester, Essex, England. He has an older sister, Alexandra, and brother, Elliot, who are also former competitive figure skaters. He attended the Colne Community School in Brightlingsea.

== Career ==
=== Early years ===
Appleby began learning to skate in 2009. In October 2018, he debuted on the ISU Junior Grand Prix (JGP) circuit, finishing eighteenth in Ljubljana, Slovenia. He placed thirty-sixth at the 2019 World Junior Championships and twenty-sixth at the 2020 World Junior Championships.

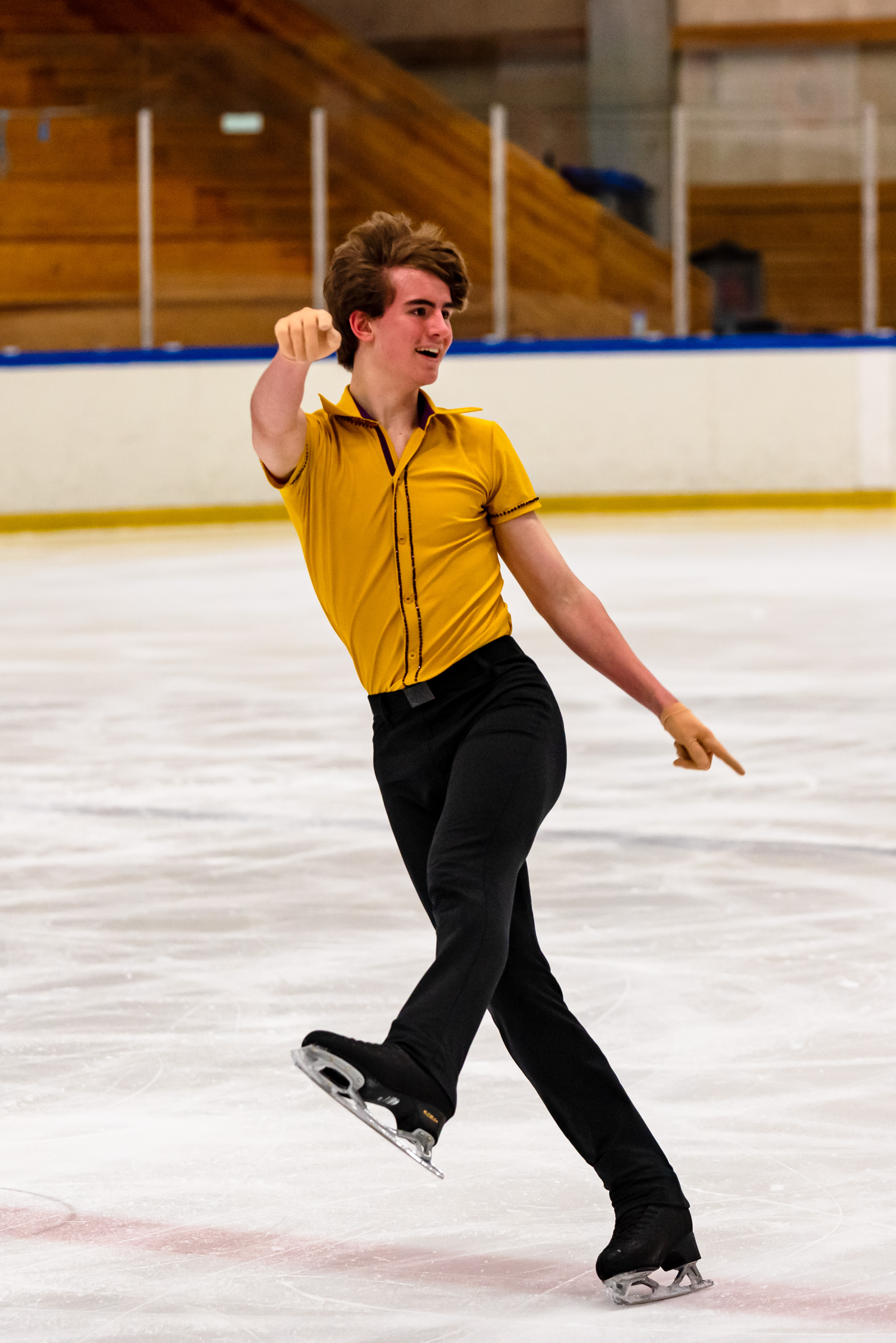
Appleby at the 2022 Reykjavík International Games.

=== 2021–22 season ===
In late August, Appleby won bronze in Courchevel, France, at the second event of the 2021–22 ISU Junior Grand Prix season. It was the first Junior Grand Prix medal won by a British skater in almost 20 years. In April, he qualified to the final segment at the 2022 World Junior Championships in Tallinn, Estonia. Ranked eighteenth in the short program and twenty-first in the free skate, he finished twentieth overall.

=== 2022–23 season ===
Appleby made his senior ISU Grand Prix debut at the 2022 MK John Wilson Trophy, where he placed last overall. At the British Figure Skating Championships, he competed in the senior category for the first time and placed second behind Graham Newberry. He was selected to compete at the 2023 World Junior Championships, where he placed seventeenth.

=== 2023–24 season ===
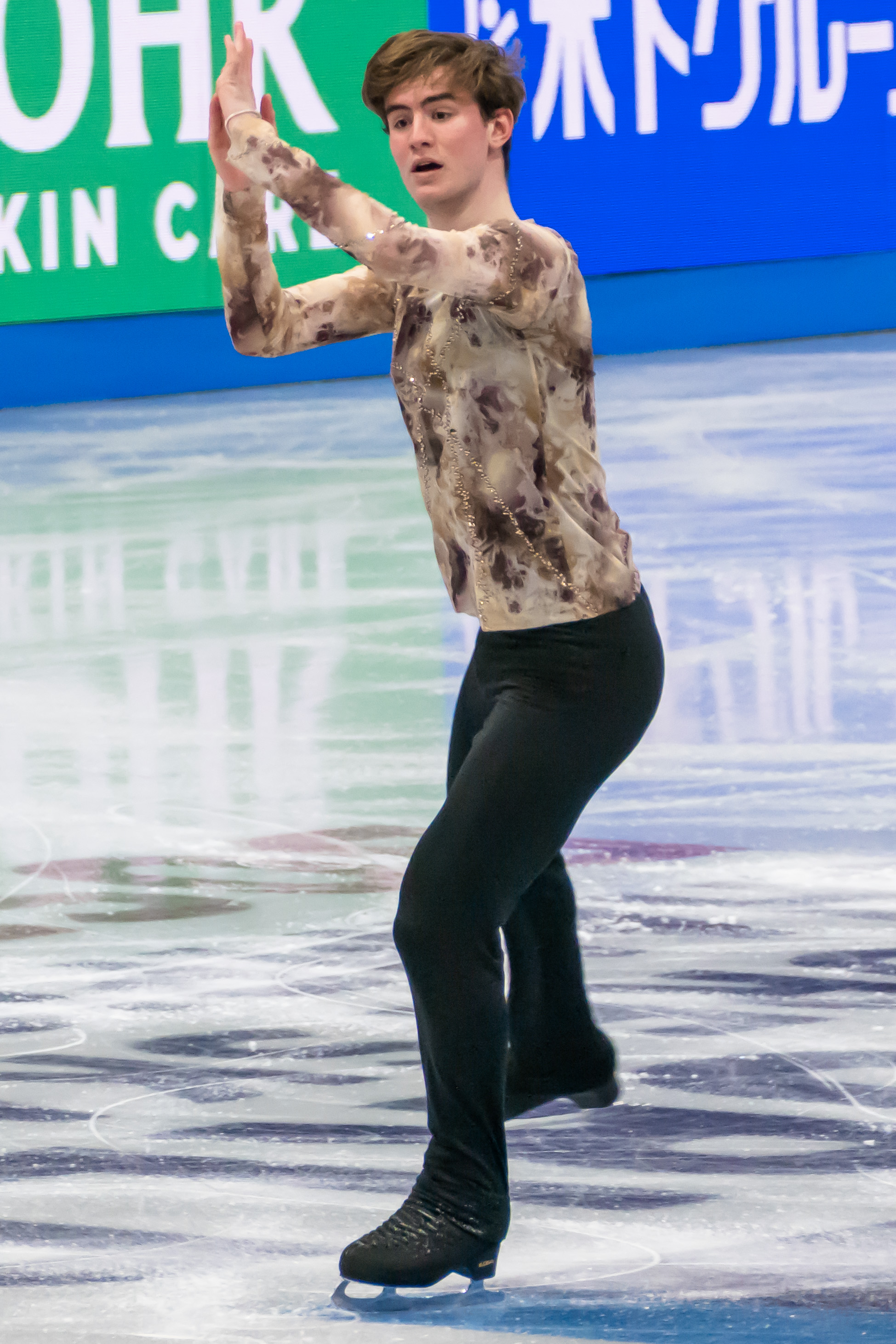
Appleby performing his short program at the 2025 World Championships

Competing in the 2023–24 ISU Junior Grand Prix series, Appleby placed sixth at the 2023 JGP Austria and fourth at the 2024 JGP Poland. In December, Appleby won his first senior national title at the 2024 British Championships. The week after, he competed at the Golden Spin of Zagreb, where he placed sixth and achieved the technical minimums to be eligible for the 2024 World Figure Skating Championships. At his first European Championships, he placed twenty-fifth in the short program and did not advance to the free skate.

Appleby was assigned to the 2024 World Junior Championships, and finished ninth, his highest-ever placement at the event. Weeks later, he competed at the 2024 World Championships, placing thirty-eighth in the short program and failing to advance to the free skate.

=== 2024–25 season ===
Prior to the season, Appleby added Alina Mayer-Virtanen to his coaching team, making frequent trips to Laukaa, Finland to work with her, while also continuing to train in Romford with John Wicker. He ultimately began the season with a sixth-place finish at the 2024 CS Nebelhorn Trophy. He would then go on to finish fifth at the 2024 Tayside Trophy. Continuing to compete on the 2024–25 ISU Challenger Series, he finished seventh at the 2024 CS Nepela Memorial.

In December, Appleby won his second consecutive national title at the 2025 British Championships. The following month, he competed at the 2025 European Championships in Tallinn, Estonia, where he finished twentieth overall.

Shortly before the 2025 World Championships, Appleby left his longtime coach, John Wicker, and relocated to Swindon to train under Christopher Boyadji and Lloyd Jones. In addition, he continued working with Alina Mayer-Virtanen in Laukaa. At the World Championships, he placed thirty-second in the short program and did not advance to the free skate segment.

=== 2025–26 season: Milano Cortina Olympics ===
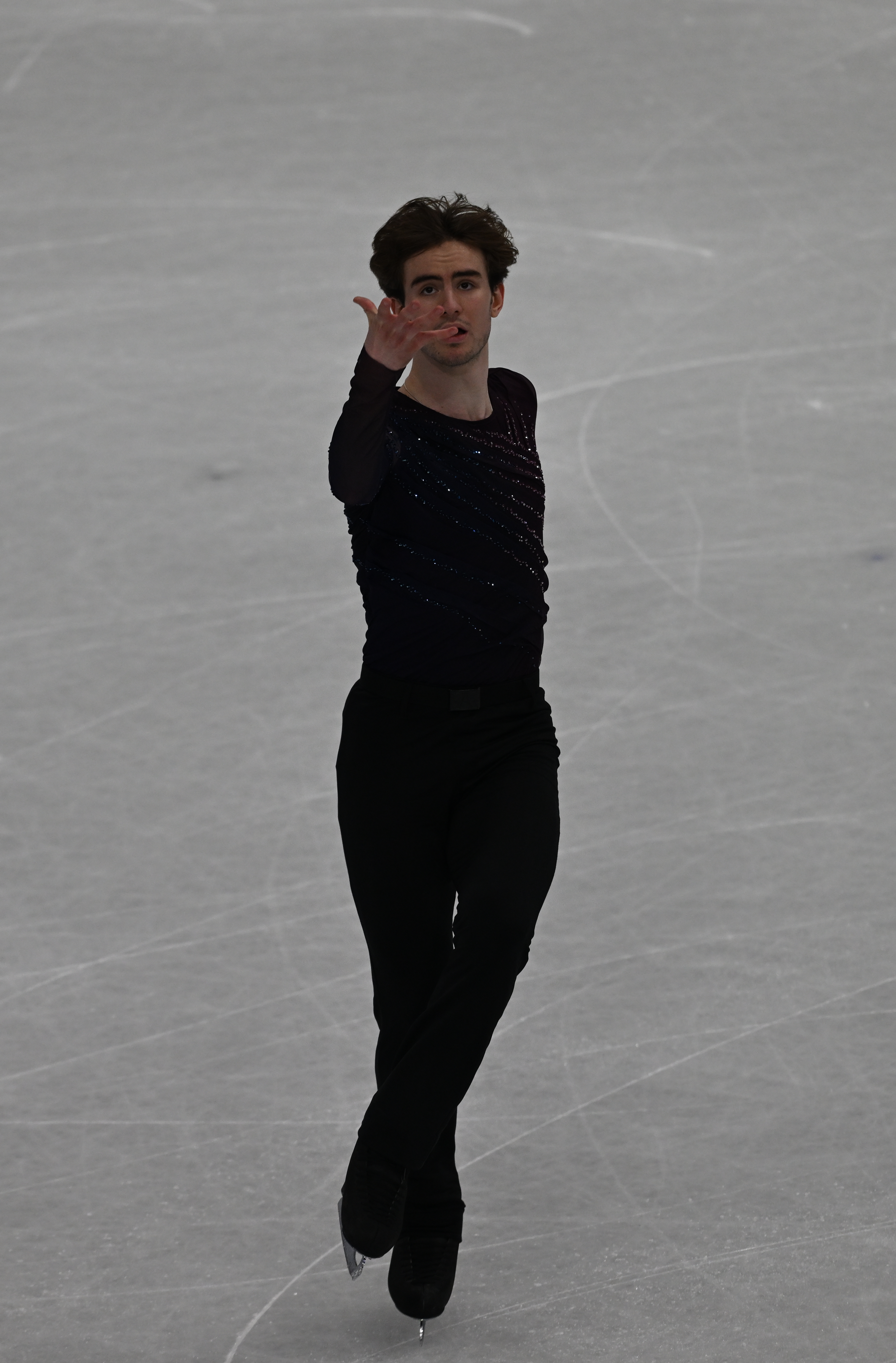
Appleby at the 2026 Winter Olympics

During the off-season, Appleby sustained an ankle injury. Still not fully recovered, he competed at the 2025 Skate to Milano, the final qualifying event for the 2026 Winter Olympics, in September. He ultimately finished in eighteenth place before going on to place sixth at the 2025 Swiss Open and fourth at the 2025 Cup of Innsbruck. In December, Appleby won his third consecutive national title at the 2026 British Championships. Following the event, he was selected as Great Britain's men's singles representative for the team event at the 2026 Winter Olympics. One month later, Appleby competed at the 2026 European Championships as the home crowd favourite, finishing in twenty-fourth place.

On 7 February, Appleby placed tenth in the short program and scored a season's best in the 2026 Winter Olympics Figure Skating Team Event. "Obviously it wasn’t a clean skate, but it felt very solid and it was one that just let me enjoy the moment a little more," he said. "I could just be proud of the hard work that we put in to get here." Team Great Britain ultimately finished in ninth place overall.

In March, Appleby competed at the 2026 World Championships. He placed thirty-third in the short program and did not advance to the free skate.

== Programs ==
Season	Short program	Free skating	Exhibition
2025–2026	Another Love by Tom Odell; Another Love (Remix) performed by Dimitri Vangelis & Wyman choreo. by Stéphane Lambiel	503; 160 BPM; Air (from Angels & Demons) by Hans Zimmer & Nick Glennie-Smith; Lux Aeterna (from Requiem for a Dream) by Clint Mansell & Kronos Quartet choreo. by Stéphane Lambiel	
2024–2025	Step Out for a While by Patrick Watson choreo. by Stéphane Lambiel	Sand Wick; Excommunicado by Tyler Bates & Joel J. Richard; John Wick Mode by Le Castle Vania, Tyler Bates, & Joel J. Richard choreo. by Stéphane Lambiel	Main Theme (from Johnny English) by Edward Shearmur; Sandstorm by Darude
2023–2024	You Should Be Dancing by Bee Gees, Albhy Galuten, Karl Richardson; Disco Inferno (Glee Cast Version) by Glee Cast, Adam Anders, Peer Åström, & Ryan Murphy choreo. by Wendi Ross	Sand Wick; Excommunicado by Tyler Bates & Joel J. Richard; John Wick Mode by Le Castle Vania, Tyler Bates, & Joel J. Richard choreo. by Stéphane Lambiel	Main Theme (from Johnny English) by Edward Shearmur; Sandstorm by Darude
2022–2023	Dawn of Faith by Eternal Eclipse choreo. by Wendi Ross, John Kerr	Scars by Michael Malarkey; Bad Things by Jace Everett choreo. by Wendi Ross, John Kerr	Disco Inferno by The Trammps performed by Amber Riley
2021–2022	Don't You Know by Kungs ft. Jamie N. Commons	Cry by Jon Batiste; I Need You by Jon Batiste	
2019–2020	I Will Wait by Mumford & Sons	Sherlock Holmes by Hans Zimmer; Discombobulate; I Never Woke Up in Handcuffs Before; Catatonic	
2018–2019	Ice Type Beat by Jorge Quintero; 300 Violin Orchestra by Jorge Quintero	Sherlock Holmes by Hans Zimmer; Discombobulate; I Never Woke Up in Handcuffs Before; Catatonic	

== Competitive highlights ==
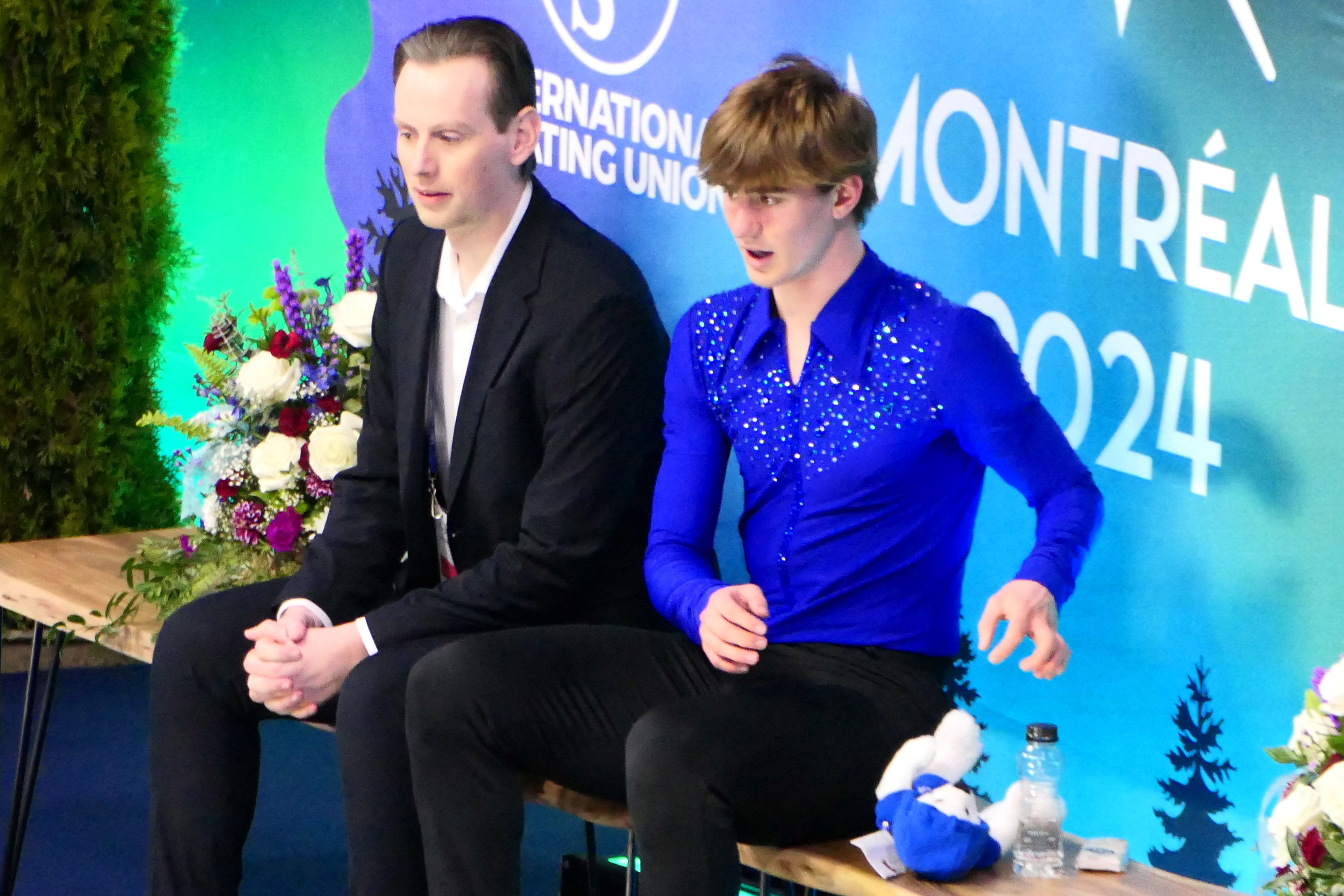
Appleby in the "kiss and cry" at the 2024 World Championships

- GP – Event of the ISU Grand Prix Series
- JGP – Event of the ISU Junior Grand Prix Series
- CS – Event of the ISU Challenger Series
- TBD – Assigned
- WD – Withdrew from competition
- Medals at team events are awarded for the team results only. Individual placements at team events are listed in parentheses.

Competition placements at senior level
Season	2021–22	2022–23	2023–24	2024–25	2025–26
Winter Olympics (Team event)					9th (10th)
World Championships			38th	32nd	33rd
European Championships			25th	20th	24th
British Championships		2nd	1st	1st	1st
GP Wilson Trophy		12th			
CS Golden Spin of Zagreb			6th		
CS Nebelhorn Trophy				6th	
CS Nepela Memorial		9th		7th	
CS Warsaw Cup			9th		
Cup of Innsbruck					4th
Skate to Milano					18th
Tayside Trophy	4th	2nd	5th	5th	
Trophée Métropole Nice	8th				

Competition placements at junior level
Season	2017–18	2018–19	2019–20	2021–22	2022–23	2023–24
World Junior Championships		36th	26th	20th	17th	9th
British Championships	3rd	3rd	1st	1st		
JGP Austria						6th
JGP Croatia			16th			
JGP France				3rd		
JGP Latvia			9th			
JGP Poland				10th		4th
JGP Slovenia		18th				
Bavarian Open		9th				
Challenge Cup			3rd			
European Youth Olympic Festival				4th		
Mentor Toruń Cup		15th	1st			
Reykjavik Games			1st	1st		
Skate Helena		6th				
Sofia Trophy		4th				
Tayside Trophy			2nd			
Volvo Open Cup					1st	6th

== Detailed results ==
ISU personal best scores in the +5/-5 GOE System
Segment	Type	Score	Event
Total	TSS	216.48	2024 CS Nebelhorn Trophy
Short program	TSS	75.69	2024 World Junior Championships
Short program	TES	42.11	2024 World Junior Championships
Short program	PCS	34.56	2024 CS Nebelhorn Trophy
Free skating	TSS	142.46	2024 CS Nebelhorn Trophy
Free skating	TES	75.57	2023 CS Golden Spin of Zagreb
Free skating	PCS	71.27	2024 CS Nebelhorn Trophy

=== Senior level ===
Results in the 2021–22 season
Date	Event	SP		FS		Total	
Date	Event	P	Score	P	Score	P	Score
20–24 Oct 2021	(France) 2021 Trophée Métropole Nice Côte d'Azur	5	69.21	12	108.36	8	177.57
6–7 Nov 2021	(United Kingdom) 2021 Tayside Trophy	4	65.96	4	124.73	4	190.69

Results in the 2022–23 season
Date	Event	SP		FS		Total	
Date	Event	P	Score	P	Score	P	Score
29 Sep – 1 Oct 2022	(Slovakia) 2022 CS Nepela Memorial	5	67.85	11	114.79	9	182.64
15–16 Oct 2022	(United Kingdom) 2022 Tayside Trophy	2	67.72	2	117.27	2	184.99
11–13 Nov 2022	(United Kingdom) 2022 MK John Wilson Trophy	11	62.52	11	117.61	12	180.13
1–4 Dec 2022	(United Kingdom) 2023 British Championships	2	73.33	3	108.96	2	182.29

Results in the 2023–24 season
Date	Event	SP		FS		Total	
Date	Event	P	Score	P	Score	P	Score
14–15 Oct 2023	(United Kingdom) 2023 Tayside Trophy	4	65.31	5	120.67	5	185.98
15–17 Nov 2023	(Poland) 2023 CS Warsaw Cup	6	71.21	8	131.47	9	202.68
27 Nov – 3 Dec 2023	(United Kingdom) 2024 British Championships	1	70.43	1	149.18	1	219.61
6–9 Dec 2023	(Croatia) 2023 CS Golden Spin of Zagreb	10	61.18	5	138.34	6	199.52
8–14 Jan 2024	(Lithuania) 2024 European Championships	25	63.59	—N/a	—N/a	25	63.59
18–24 Mar 2024	(Canada) 2024 World Championships	38	59.51	—N/a	—N/a	38	59.51

Results in the 2024–25 season
Date	Event	SP		FS		Total	
Date	Event	P	Score	P	Score	P	Score
18–21 Sep 2024	(Germany) 2024 CS Nebelhorn Trophy	5	74.02	7	142.46	6	216.48
12–13 Oct 2024	(United Kingdom) 2024 Tayside Trophy	5	61.43	5	121.57	5	183.00
25–27 Oct 2024	(Slovakia) 2024 CS Nepela Memorial	11	62.87	7	122.10	7	184.97
27 Nov – 1 Dec 2024	(United Kingdom) 2025 British Championships	1	74.90	1	153.17	1	228.07
28 Jan – 2 Feb 2025	(Estonia) 2025 European Championships	16	72.45	21	115.39	20	187.84
24–30 Mar 2025	(United States) 2025 World Championships	32	66.70	—N/a	—N/a	32	66.70

Results in the 2025–26 season
Date	Event	SP		FS		Total	
Date	Event	P	Score	P	Score	P	Score
18–21 Sep 2025	(China) 2025 ISU Skate to Milano	10	69.35	21	104.77	18	174.12
13–16 Nov 2025	(Austria) 2025 Cup of Innsbruck	4	63.66	4	113.66	4	177.32
26–30 Nov 2025	(United Kingdom) 2026 British Championships	1	74.69	2	128.18	1	202.87
13–18 Jan 2026	(United Kingdom) 2026 European Championships	22	64.95	23	116.77	24	181.72
Feb 6–8, 2026	(Italy) 2026 Winter Olympics – Team event	10	69.68	—N/a	—N/a	9	—N/a
Mar 24–29, 2026	(Czech Republic) 2026 World Championships	33	64.30	—N/a	—N/a	33	64.30

=== Junior level ===
Results in the 2017–18 season
Date	Event	SP		FS		Total	
Date	Event	P	Score	P	Score	P	Score
28 Nov – 4 Dec 2017	(United Kingdom) 2018 British Championships (Junior)	3	42.88	3	72.50	3	115.38

Results in the 2018–19 season
Date	Event	SP		FS		Total	
Date	Event	P	Score	P	Score	P	Score
3–6 Oct 2018	2018 JGP Slovenia	20	38.09	18	74.51	18	112.60
26 Nov – 1 Dec 2018	(United Kingdom) 2019 British Championships (Junior)	4	34.77	2	82.33	3	117.10
8–13 Jan 2019	(Poland) 2019 Mentor Toruń Cup	16	41.23	14	77.48	15	118.71
16–19 Jan 2019	(Serbia) 2019 Skate Helena	7	41.89	5	84.45	6	126.34
5–10 Feb 2019	(Bulgaria) 2019 Sofia Trophy	6	45.07	4	92.99	4	138.06
5–10 Feb 2019	(Germany) 2019 Bavarian Open	8	49.16	11	81.49	9	130.65
4–10 Mar 2019	(Croatia) 2019 World Junior Championships	36	44.80	–	–	36	44.80

Results in the 2019–20 season
Date	Event	SP		FS		Total	
Date	Event	P	Score	P	Score	P	Score
4–7 Sep 2019	2019 JGP Latvia	12	58.77	9	111.02	9	169.79
25–28 Sep 2019	2019 JGP Croatia	15	52.24	16	92.09	16	144.33
12–13 Aug 2019	(United Kingdom) 2019 Tayside Trophy	2	42.51	1	105.18	2	147.69
26 Nov – 1 Dec 2019	(United Kingdom) 2020 British Championships (Junior)	1	56.62	1	114.38	1	171.00
7–12 Jan 2020	(Poland) 2020 Mentor Toruń Cup	3	53.83	1	117.07	1	170.90
24–26 Jan 2020	(Iceland) 2020 Reykjavik International Games	1	45.71	1	99.69	1	145.40
20–23 Feb 2020	(Netherlands) 2020 International Challenge Cup	11	47.32	2	116.20	3	163.52
2–8 Mar 2020	(Estonia) 2020 World Junior Championships	26	54.56	–	–	26	54.56

Results in the 2021–22 season
Date	Event	SP		FS		Total	
Date	Event	P	Score	P	Score	P	Score
25–28 Aug 2021	2021 JGP France II	2	63.23	3	119.18	3	182.41
29 Sep – 2 Oct 2021	2021 JGP Poland	12	60.30	9	115.56	10	175.86
30 Nov – 5 Dec 2021	(United Kingdom) 2022 British Championships (Junior)	1	63.87	1	107.59	1	171.46
4–6 Feb 2022	(Iceland) 2022 Reykjavik International Games	1	63.69	1	98.88	1	162.57
20–25 Mar 2022	(Finland) 2022 European Youth Olympic Winter Festival	3	68.58	5	115.88	4	184.46
13–17 Apr 2022	(Estonia) 2022 World Junior Championships	18	64.05	21	109.91	20	173.96

Results in the 2022–23 season
Date	Event	SP		FS		Total	
Date	Event	P	Score	P	Score	P	Score
19–22 Jan 2023	(Latvia) 2023 Volvo Open Cup	1	70.19	2	119.33	1	189.52
27 Feb – 5 Mar 2023	(Canada) 2023 World Junior Championships	17	62.49	18	111.38	17	173.87

Results in the 2023–24 season
Date	Event	SP		FS		Total	
Date	Event	P	Score	P	Score	P	Score
30 Aug – 2 Sep 2023	2023 JGP Austria	5	66.16	7	120.03	6	186.19
27–30 Sept 2023	2023 JGP Poland	2	71.14	9	107.83	4	178.97
18–21 Jan 2024	(Latvia) 2024 Volvo Open Cup	5	62.48	6	108.49	6	170.97
26 Feb – 3 Mar 2024	(Taiwan) 2024 World Junior Championships	6	75.69	11	129.86	9	205.55
