= Elizabeth Golding =

Judge and children's right advocate

Elizabeth Bass Golding
- Born: Elizabeth Bass; 1900
- Died: January 6, 2001 (age 100); Fort Lauderdale, Florida
- Occupations: judge, children's rights advocate

Elizabeth Bass Golding (1900 – January 6, 2001) was an American judge of the Nassau County Family Court in New York and an advocate for children's rights.

== Life and career ==
Golding was born Elizabeth Bass in Manhattan. She graduated 2nd in her class from New York University School of Law in 1921. She was one of the first women admitted to the bar in the state of New York.

After graduating from law school, she established her own practice. She later practiced in partnership with her husband.

In 1944, Golding founded the Woman's Forum of Nassau County.

In 1963, Golding was appointed to the Nassau County Family Court. In the election later that year, she won a full eight-year term after defeating the Democratic candidate Beatrice S. Burstein. As a judge, Golding formed a committee of lawyers, social workers and members of other professions. Its lobbying led to the Youth Hostels Act, passed by the New York State Legislature in 1969, which authorized the appropriation of public money for group homes.

Later, Golding established Hope for Youth, an organization that relied largely on private fundraising. Its first home, in Rockville Centre, was one of the earliest group homes and opened with seven boys. The organization later grew to five homes, which housed thousands of young people.

Golding died at age 100 in Fort Lauderdale, Florida.
