= Wesley Chiu =

Canadian figure skater

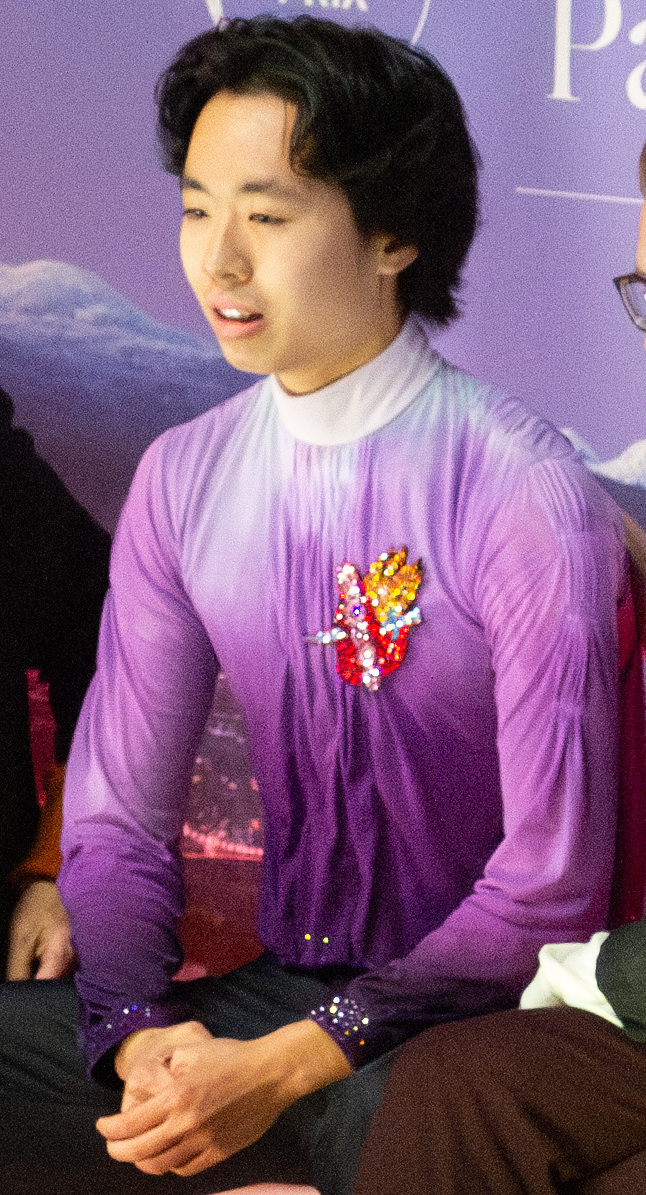
- Wesley Chiu at the 2023 Skate Canada International

Personal information
- Born: March 20, 2005 (age 21) Vancouver, British Columbia, Canada
- Home town: Richmond, British Columbia
- Height: 1.70 m (5 ft 7 in)

Figure skating career
- Country: Canada
- Discipline: Men's singles
- Coach: Keegan Murphy; Eileen Murphy
- Skating club: Connaught Skating Club
- Began skating: 2009

Medal record
Canadian Championships
Gold medal – first place	2024 Calgary	Singles
Bronze medal – third place	2022 Ottawa	Singles
Bronze medal – third place	2023 Oshawa	Singles

Wesley Chiu
- Traditional Chinese: 趙崇諾
- Simplified Chinese: 赵崇诺
Transcriptions
Standard Mandarin
- Hanyu Pinyin: Zhào Chóngnuò
- IPA: [ʈʂâʊ ʈʂʰʊ̌ŋnwô]
Yue: Cantonese
- Jyutping: Jiu6 Sung4 Nok6

Wesley Chiu (born March 20, 2005) is a Canadian figure skater. He is the 2024 Canadian champion and a two-time national bronze medallist (2022–23). He placed fourth at the 2022 World Junior Championships and won two medals on the ISU Junior Grand Prix, including gold at the 2021 JGP France II.

== Career ==
=== Early years ===
Chiu began learning to skate in 2009. In his early years in competitive skating at the national level, he was the 2017 Skate Canada Challenge silver medallist at the pre-novice level. Debuting as a novice the following season, he was the bronze medallist at the 2018 Skate Canada Challenge and finished ninth at the 2018 Canadian Novice Championships. In the 2018–19 season, he won gold at both Skate Canada Challenge and the 2019 Canadian Novice Championships and made his international debut at the advanced novice level by winning the Bavarian Open.

=== 2019–20 season: Junior international debut ===
After his novice results, Chiu was selected to make his Junior Grand Prix debut at the 2019 JGP Italy in Egna-Neumarkt. He finished thirteenth. Returning to the domestic scene, he won the silver medal at both Skate Canada Challenge and the 2020 Canadian Junior Championships.

=== 2020–21 season ===
Due to the COVID-19 pandemic, the Junior Grand Prix and the rest of the international junior season were cancelled. Chiu competed only domestically, winning bronze at the junior level at a virtually-held Skate Canada Challenge. This would have qualified him to the 2021 Canadian Championships, but these were cancelled due to the pandemic.

=== 2021–22 season: First JGP and national medals ===
Chiu returned to international competition with the resumption of the Junior Grand Prix, competing at the second installment of the French JGP in Courchevel. Due to pandemic restrictions, skaters from Russia could not attend the event. Chiu won the short program by a wide margin but struggled in the free skate, remaining narrowly in first overall and taking the gold medal. Speaking afterwards, he said that the short program result caused "a lot of excitement", as a result of which in "the long program, I feel like I struggled a bit in the beginning, but I was able to push that aside and really finish the program strong." At his second assignment, the 2021 JGP Russia in Krasnoyarsk, he won the bronze medal. He was one of only two non-Russian competitors to podium at the event in any discipline. He landed a quad toe loop in international competition for the first time, calling it "another great milestone I've achieved." Chiu's gold medal qualified him for the 2021–22 Junior Grand Prix Final, intended to be held in Osaka, but it was cancelled due to restrictions prompted by the Omicron variant.

Following the end of the Junior Grand Prix, Chiu was sent to make his international senior debut at the 2021 CS Warsaw Cup. Only eleventh in the short program after missing his jump combination, he rallied in the free skate, skating cleanly and landing two quads in a program for the first time. He set a new personal best and won that segment of the competition, finishing fourth overall, ten points behind bronze medallist Petr Gumennik.

Chiu next competed at the 2022 Canadian Championships in Ottawa, hoping to qualify for one of the two men's berths on the Canadian team for the 2022 Winter Olympics. Not initially considered among the top contenders, he finished a surprise second in the short program. He was only fifth in the free skate after singling a planned triple Axel but narrowly finished third overall, 0.54 points ahead of Joseph Phan. Wearing his first senior national medal, Chiu said his season was "like a rocket ship because it kept going higher and higher and kept getting better." He was named the first alternate for the Olympic team and assigned to attend the 2022 Four Continents Championships in Tallinn, which would have been his ISU championship debut. However, he had to withdraw from Four Continents due to his coach testing positive for COVID-19. Chiu's status as the first alternate for the Olympics briefly came into play when national champion Keegan Messing was initially unable to travel to Beijing due to positive COVID tests, as a result of which Chiu was standing by to depart in his stead. However, Messing was ultimately able to leave in time.

Chiu was assigned to finish his season at the 2022 World Junior Championships, held in mid-April rather than the traditional early March to accommodate a last-minute move from Sofia to Tallinn. Due to Vladimir Putin's invasion of Ukraine, all Russian and Belarusian skaters were banned by the ISU. In the short program, Chiu skated cleanly but for an edge call on his triple flip, receiving a new personal best score of 81.59. He finished second in the segment, 0.33 points ahead of Estonia's Mihhail Selevko and 7.40 points behind leader Ilia Malinin of the USA, winning a silver small medal. Errors in the free skate dropped him to fourth place overall, 5 points behind bronze medallist Tatsuya Tsuboi.

=== 2022–23 season ===
Beginning the season on the Challenger circuit, Chiu finished in tenth place at the 2022 CS U.S. Classic. He then made his senior Grand Prix debut at the 2022 Skate America, alongside American training partner Liam Kapeikis. Chiu said he was eager to participate in events with larger audiences. He finished sixth at the event, 0.40 points and one placement ahead of his friend Kapeikis. He was tenth at the 2022 Grand Prix de France.

Chiu won the silver medal at the 2022–23 Skate Canada Challenge, qualifying to the 2023 Canadian Championships. At the national championships, he had a poor short program, finishing eleventh in that segment. He was third in the free skate, rising to third overall and his second consecutive national bronze medal. Chiu related afterwards that he had been sick in advance of the championships, but had persevered through it. He was assigned to compete at the 2023 World Junior Championships.

At the World Junior Championships on home ice in Calgary, Chiu had a bad land on the first part of his planned jump combination, but was still able to complete it. He finished second in the segment for the second consecutive year, coming five points behind Japan's Kao Miura and taking another silver small medal. In the free skate, Chiu doubled both of his attempts at quad toe loop, coming eighth in the segment and dropping to fifth overall. Chiu said that he hoped to compete both at the junior and senior levels the following season, and indicated that he was developing a quad Lutz that was "going well."

=== 2023–24 season ===
Chiu began the season by winning the silver medal at the 2023 Cranberry Cup International behind Mark Gorodnitsky of Israel. He finished third in the short program at the 2023 CS Autumn Classic International, but dropped to seventh after struggling in the free skate. In his second season on the Grand Prix, Chiu finished seventh at the 2023 Skate Canada International, the highest placement of the three Canadian men in attendance. Subsequently added to the 2023 NHK Trophy, he came eleventh at the event, acknowledging "some big, costly mistakes."

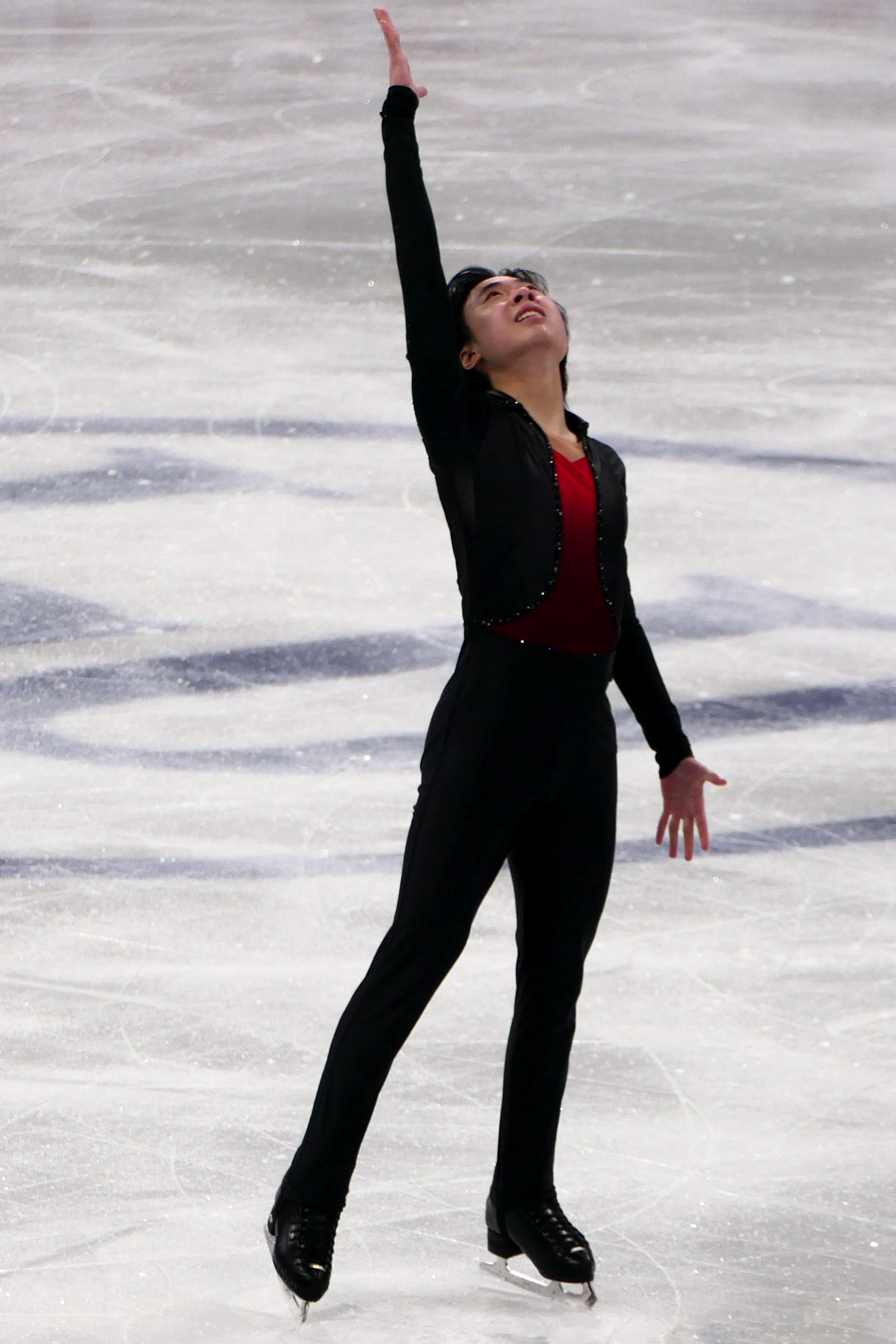
Chiu finishing his free skate at the 2024 World Championships

In the short program at the 2024 Canadian Championships, Chiu successfully landed his quad-triple combination and triple Lutz, though his triple Axel was only landed with difficulty. His 88.98 score led the segment by a wide margin. Despite problems in the free skate where he failed to land a clean quad or triple Axel, he remained in first place overall and won his first national title. On his victory, Chiu said "I can skate with more pride now. It also comes with responsibility. Really motivating to go back and train hard."

Skate Canada initially declined to name its team for the 2024 World Championships, pending the results of the 2024 Four Continents Championships in Shanghai, which Chiu attended alongside Conrad Orzel and Roman Sadovsky. He set new personal bests in the short program (83.50) and total score (240.38), and finished seventh overall, the highest placement among the Canadians. Chiu called the experience of his first senior ISU championship ""something you can't truly replicate in training," saying it was "truly eye-opening to skate alongside such incredible athletes." Afterward, he and Sadovsky were assigned to the two Canadian berths at the World Championships, being held on home ice in Montreal.

Chiu finished seventeenth in his World Championship debut. Despite errors, he said he felt he had learned a lot from the experience, explaining that "skating at home, in a sold-out arena isn't something you can really replicate in training."

=== 2024–25 season ===
Chiu began the season with a fourteenth-place finish at the 2024 Nebelhorn Trophy. He then went on to compete on the 2024–25 Grand Prix series, finishing ninth at the 2024 Skate America. Although Chiu had also been assigned to compete at the 2024 Cup of China, he suffered a bad fall in practice the day before the men's short program, where he injured his ankle. He ultimately withdrew shortly before the event. He subsequently withdrew from the 2025 Canadian Championships and later the 2025 Four Continents Championships as well, thus ending his season.

In June, Chiu shared that he had undergone surgery to treat a fracture in his ankle.

=== 2025–26 season ===
Chiu made his return to competition at the 2025 CS Warsaw Cup, where he finished in ninth place. He subsequently followed this up by winning gold at the 2025 Skate Canada Challenge.

In January, Chiu competed at the 2026 Canadian Championships, where he finished in fourth place.

=== 2026–27 season ===
Chiu opened the new season at the 2026 CS Budapest Trophy where he placed fourteenth overall. In October, Chiu placed tenth at the 2026 Skate Canada International.

== Programs ==
Season	Short program	Free skating	Exhibition
2026–2027	Adiós Nonino by Ástor Piazzolla choreo. by Joey Russell	Butterfly by Jon Batiste choreo. by Joey Russell	
2025–2026	How It Ends by DeVotchKa choreo. by Joey Russell	Nuvole Bianche by Ludovico Einaudi ft. Nathan Wu; Experience by Ludovico Einaudi, Daniel Hope, & I Virtuosi Italiani choreo. by Shae-Lynn Bourne	
2024–2025	1812 Overture by Pyotr Ilyich Tchaikovsky performed by Chicago Symphony Orchestra, Fritz Reiner, & ALIBI Music choreo. by Joey Russell	Nuvole Bianche by Ludovico Einaudi ft. Nathan Wu; Experience by Ludovico Einaudi, Daniel Hope, & I Virtuosi Italiani choreo. by Shae-Lynn Bourne	
2023–2024	O Verona; Kissing You performed by Sam Smith; Hanging; Escape (from Romeo + Juliet) by Craig Armstrong choreo. by Joey Russell	The Verdict (from The Big Gundown) by Ennio Morricone; Battle Without Honor or Humanity (from New Battles Without Honor and Humanity) by Tomoyasu Hotei; Twisted Nerve by Bernard Herrmann; Don't Let Me Be Misunderstood by Jac Ross; L'arena (from Il Mercenario) by Ennio Morricone choreo. by Joey Russell	Alors on danse by Stromae choreo. by Yebin Mok; Fire and Rain by James Taylor
2022–2023	Vincent by Don McLean performed by Govardo choreo. by Joey Russell	Nella Fantasia by Ennio Morricone & Chiara Ferraù performed by Nathan Pacheco choreo. by Joey Russell	This Is What It Feels Like by Armin van Buuren ft. Trevor Guthrie
2021–2022	Vincent by Don McLean performed by Govardo choreo. by Joey Russell	I Belong to You by Muse choreo. by Joey Russell	
2019–2020	Stargazing by Kygo choreo. by Joey Russell, Keegan Murphy	Casablanca by Max Steiner choreo. by Joey Russell, Keegan Murphy	

== Competitive highlights ==
- GP – Event of the ISU Grand Prix Series
- JGP – Event of the ISU Junior Grand Prix Series
- CS – Event of the ISU Challenger Series
- C – Event was cancelled
- TBD – Assigned
- WD – Withdrew from competition

Competition placements at senior level
Season	2021–22	2022–23	2023–24	2024–25	2025–26	2026-27
World Championships			17th			
Four Continents Championships			7th		12th	
Canadian Championships	3rd	3rd	1st		4th	
GP France		10th				
GP NHK Trophy			11th			
GP Skate America		6th		9th		
GP Skate Canada			7th			10th
CS Autumn Classic			7th			
CS Nebelhorn Trophy				14th		
CS U.S. Classic		10th				
CS Warsaw Cup	4th				9th	
CS Cranberry Cup			2nd			
CS Budapest Trophy						14th
Skate Canada Challenge		2nd			1st	

Competition placements at junior level
Season	2018–19	2019–20	2020–21	2021–22	2022–23
World Junior Championships				4th	5th
Canadian Championships		2nd	C		
JGP France				1st	
JGP Italy		13th			
JGP Russia				3rd	
Bavarian Open	1st				
Skate Canada Challenge		2nd	3rd		

== Detailed results ==
ISU personal best scores in the +5/-5 GOE System
Segment	Type	Score	Event
Total	TSS	240.38	2024 Four Continents Championships
Short program	TSS	83.50	2024 Four Continents Championships
Short program	TES	46.03	2024 Four Continents Championships
Short program	PCS	38.36	2023 World Junior Championships
Free skating	TSS	162.24	2021 CS Warsaw Cup
Free skating	TES	85.94	2021 CS Warsaw Cup
Free skating	PCS	76.35	2024 Four Continents Championships

- Small medals for the short program and free skating are only awarded at ISU Championships.

=== Senior level ===
Results in the 2021–22 season
Date	Event	SP		FS		Total	
Date	Event	P	Score	P	Score	P	Score
Nov 17–20, 2021	(Poland) 2021 CS Warsaw Cup	11	70.15	1	162.24	4	232.39
Jan 6–12, 2022	(Canada) 2022 Canadian Championships	2	81.47	5	150.57	3	232.04

Results in the 2022–23 season
Date	Event	SP		FS		Total	
Date	Event	P	Score	P	Score	P	Score
Sep 12–16, 2022	(United States) 2022 CS U.S. International Classic	10	55.14	9	116.55	10	171.69
Oct 21–23, 2022	(United States) 2022 Skate America	9	71.58	6	148.32	6	219.90
Nov 4–6, 2022	2022 Grand Prix de France	11	67.95	10	142.00	10	209.95
Jan 9–15, 2023	(Canada) 2023 Canadian Championships	11	65.44	3	160.71	3	226.15

Results in the 2023–24 season
Date	Event	SP		FS		Total	
Date	Event	P	Score	P	Score	P	Score
Aug 9–13, 2023	(United States) 2023 Cranberry Cup International	5	72.33	1	158.19	2	230.52
Sep 14–17, 2023	(Canada) 2023 CS Autumn Classic International	3	80.93	8	127.89	7	208.82
Oct 27–29, 2023	2023 Skate Canada International	7	76.40	8	144.60	7	208.82
Nov 24–26, 2023	(Japan) 2023 NHK Trophy	11	72.02	10	137.14	11	209.16
Jan 8–14, 2024	(Canada) 2024 Canadian Championships	1	88.98	3	143.17	1	232.15
Jan 30 – Feb 4, 2024	(China) 2024 Four Continents Championships	6	83.50	7	156.88	7	240.38
Mar 18–24, 2024	(Canada) 2024 World Championships	18	78.00	16	149.21	17	227.21

Results in the 2024–25 season
Date	Event	SP		FS		Total	
Date	Event	P	Score	P	Score	P	Score
Sep 18–21, 2024	(Germany) 2024 CS Nebelhorn Trophy	6	73.46	16	116.31	14	189.77
Oct 18–20, 2024	(United States) 2024 Skate America	10	66.86	9	140.08	9	206.94

Results in the 2025–26 season
Date	Event	SP		FS		Total	
Date	Event	P	Score	P	Score	P	Score
Nov 19–23, 2025	(Poland) 2025 CS Warsaw Cup	10	63.75	7	134.76	9	198.51
Nov 27–29, 2025	2025 Skate Canada Challenge	2	83.63	2	140.98	1	224.61
Jan 6–11, 2026	(Canada) 2026 Canadian Championships	2	89.14	4	152.34	4	241.48
Jan 21–25, 2026	(China) 2026 Four Continents Championships	15	73.61	11	146.70	12	220.31

Results in the 2026-27 season
Date	Event	SP		FS		Total	
Date	Event	P	Score	P	Score	P	Score
Oct 15-18, 2026	(Hungary) 2026 CS Budapest Trophy	10	71.93	15	115.17	14	187.10
Oct 30 - Nov 1, 2026	2026 Skate Canada International	9	73.87	10	127.07	10	200.94

=== Junior level ===
Results in the 2019–20 season
Date	Event	SP		FS		Total	
Date	Event	P	Score	P	Score	P	Score
Oct 2–5, 2019	2019 JGP Italy	14	55.51	13	111.78	13	167.29
Nov 27 – Dec 1, 2019	2020 Skate Canada Challenge	5	59.11	1	120.53	2	179.64
Jan 13–19, 2020	(Canada) 2020 Canadian Championships (Junior)	1	76.12	4	122.32	2	198.44

Results in the 2020–21 season
Date	Event	SP		FS		Total	
Date	Event	P	Score	P	Score	P	Score
Jan 8–17, 2021	2021 Skate Canada Challenge	5	57.47	2	121.83	3	179.30

Results in the 2021–22 season
Date	Event	SP		FS		Total	
Date	Event	P	Score	P	Score	P	Score
Aug 25–28, 2021	2021 JGP France II	1	76.26	2	123.63	1	199.89
Sep 15–18, 2021	2021 JGP Russia	4	76.63	3	140.96	3	217.59
Apr 13–17, 2022	(Estonia) 2022 World Junior Championships	2	81.59	4	146.70	4	228.29

Results in the 2022–23 season
Date	Event	SP		FS		Total	
Date	Event	P	Score	P	Score	P	Score
Feb 27 – Mar 5, 2023	(Canada) 2023 World Junior Championships	2	80.56	8	133.32	5	213.88
