= 2023 Grand Prix of Espoo =

Figure skating competition

- Type: Grand Prix
- Date: November 17 – 19
- Season: 2023–24
- Location: Espoo, Finland
- Venue: Espoo Metro Areena

Champions
- Men's singles: (Japan) Kao Miura
- Women's singles: (Japan) Kaori Sakamoto
- Pairs: (Germany) Minerva Fabienne Hase / Nikita Volodin
- Ice dance: (United States) Madison Chock / Evan Bates
- Previous: 2022 Grand Prix of Espoo
- Next: 2024 Finlandia Trophy
- Previous Grand Prix: 2023 Cup of China
- Next Grand Prix: 2023 NHK Trophy

The 2023 Grand Prix of Espoo was the fifth event of the 2023–24 ISU Grand Prix of Figure Skating: a senior-level international invitational competition series. It was held at the Espoo Metro Areena in Espoo, Finland, from November 17–19. Medals were awarded in men's singles, women's singles, pair skating, and ice dance. Skaters earned points toward qualifying for the 2023–24 Grand Prix Final.

== Entries ==
The International Skating Union announced the preliminary assignments on June 28, 2023.

Country	Men	Women	Pairs	Ice dance
Canada			Brooke McIntosh / Benjamin Mimar	Nadiia Bashynska / Peter Beaumont; Laurence Fournier Beaudry / Nikolaj Sørensen
China			Peng Cheng / Wang Lei	
Czech Republic				Kateřina Mrázková / Daniel Mrázek
Estonia	Arlet Levandi			
Finland	Makar Suntsev	Janna Jyrkinen; Oona Ounasvuori; Nella Pelkonen	Milania Väänänen / Filippo Clerici	Yuka Orihara / Juho Pirinen; Juulia Turkkila / Matthias Versluis
France	Kévin Aymoz	Lorine Schild	Camille Kovalev / Pavel Kovalev	
Germany	Nikita Starostin		Minerva Fabienne Hase / Nikita Volodin	Jennifer Janse van Rensburg / Benjamin Steffan
Hungary			Maria Pavlova / Alexei Sviatchenko	Mariia Ignateva / Danijil Szemko
Italy	Nikolaj Memola; Matteo Rizzo	Lara Naki Gutmann	Sara Conti / Niccolò Macii	
Japan	Kao Miura; Shun Sato; Koshiro Shimada	Mana Kawabe; Kaori Sakamoto; Rion Sumiyoshi		
South Korea		Kim Chae-yeon; You Young		
Ukraine	Ivan Shmuratko			
United States	Liam Kapeikis; Jimmy Ma	Starr Andrews; Amber Glenn	Ellie Kam / Danny O'Shea	Christina Carreira / Anthony Ponomarenko; Madison Chock / Evan Bates; Emilea Zingas / Vadym Kolesnik

== Changes to preliminary assignments ==
Discipline	Withdrew		Added		Notes	Ref.
Discipline	Date	Skater(s)	Date	Skater(s)	Notes	Ref.
Women	—		August 17	(Finland) Janna Jyrkinen	Host picks	
Women	—		August 17	(Finland) Oona Ounasvuori	Host picks	
Women	—		August 17	(Finland) Nella Pelkonen	Host picks	
Men	—		August 24	(United States) Jimmy Ma		
Men	November 6	(Sweden) Andreas Nordebäck	November 7	(United States) Liam Kapeikis		
Women	November 6	(Switzerland) Kimmy Repond	November 8	(Italy) Lara Naki Gutmann	Injury	
Men	November 13	(Azerbaijan) Vladimir Litvintsev	November 14	(Germany) Nikita Starostin		
Men	November 13	(South Korea) Cha Jun-hwan	November 14	(Ukraine) Ivan Shmuratko	Injury	

== Results ==
=== Men's singles ===
Rank	Skater	Nation	Total points	SP		FS	
1st place, gold medalist(s)	Kao Miura	Japan	274.56	1	93.54	2	181.02
2nd place, silver medalist(s)	Shun Sato	Japan	273.34	2	90.41	1	182.93
3rd place, bronze medalist(s)	Kévin Aymoz	France	250.03	5	73.94	3	176.09
4	Matteo Rizzo	Italy	241.47	6	73.37	4	168.10
5	Nikolaj Memola	Italy	221.25	7	72.11	5	149.14
6	Koshiro Shimada	Japan	218.44	4	77.81	6	140.63
7	Nikita Starostin	Germany	201.15	8	71.99	9	129.16
8	Ivan Shmuratko	Ukraine	200.67	10	66.30	7	134.37
9	Liam Kapeikis	United States	196.94	9	69.10	10	127.84
10	Arlet Levandi	Estonia	191.26	11	61.82	8	134.01
11	Jimmy Ma	United States	191.26	3	80.19	11	111.07
12	Makar Suntsev	Finland	162.00	12	54.44	12	107.56

=== Women's singles ===
Rank	Skater	Nation	Total points	SP		FS	
1st place, gold medalist(s)	Kaori Sakamoto	Japan	205.21	1	69.69	1	135.52
2nd place, silver medalist(s)	Rion Sumiyoshi	Japan	190.21	2	68.65	3	121.56
3rd place, bronze medalist(s)	Amber Glenn	United States	185.39	11	51.61	2	133.78
4	Kim Chae-yeon	South Korea	181.42	3	66.19	4	115.23
5	Lorine Schild	France	175.71	5	61.07	6	114.64
6	Nella Pelkonen	Finland	172.88	8	58.12	5	114.76
7	Lara Naki Gutmann	Italy	168.33	7	58.24	8	110.09
8	You Young	South Korea	168.14	4	63.46	9	104.68
9	Mana Kawabe	Japan	161.00	12	50.12	7	110.88
10	Starr Andrews	United States	154.42	9	57.36	10	97.06
11	Janna Jyrkinen	Finland	153.74	6	58.63	11	95.11
12	Oona Ounasvuori	Finland	144.16	10	54.21	12	89.95

=== Pairs ===
Rank	Team	Nation	Total points	SP		FS	
1st place, gold medalist(s)	Minerva Fabienne Hase / Nikita Volodin	Germany	192.72	3	63.59	1	129.13
2nd place, silver medalist(s)	Sara Conti / Niccolò Macii	Italy	188.60	2	65.00	3	123.60
3rd place, bronze medalist(s)	Maria Pavlova / Alexei Sviatchenko	Hungary	186.19	4	61.53	2	124.66
4	Peng Cheng / Wang Lei	China	186.16	1	65.25	4	120.91
5	Camille Kovalev / Pavel Kovalev	France	152.54	7	55.45	5	97.09
6	Ellie Kam / Danny O'Shea	United States	152.16	6	55.99	6	96.17
7	Brooke McIntosh / Benjamin Mimar	Canada	147.27	5	56.61	8	90.66
8	Milania Väänänen / Filippo Clerici	Finland	142.69	8	48.56	7	94.13

=== Ice dance ===
Rank	Team	Nation	Total points	RD		FD	
1st place, gold medalist(s)	Madison Chock / Evan Bates	United States	209.46	1	85.61	1	123.85
2nd place, silver medalist(s)	Laurence Fournier Beaudry / Nikolaj Sørensen	Canada	206.32	2	82.62	2	123.70
3rd place, bronze medalist(s)	Juulia Turkkila / Matthias Versluis	Finland	195.80	3	77.65	3	118.15
4	Christina Carreira / Anthony Ponomarenko	United States	188.76	4	74.58	4	114.18
5	Emilea Zingas / Vadym Kolesnik	United States	183.78	5	72.13	5	111.65
6	Yuka Orihara / Juho Pirinen	Finland	176.73	7	69.52	6	107.21
7	Kateřina Mrázková / Daniel Mrázek	Czech Republic	172.58	6	70.59	7	101.99
8	Nadiia Bashynska / Peter Beaumont	Canada	167.87	8	67.68	8	100.19
9	Jennifer Janse van Rensburg / Benjamin Steffan	Germany	164.55	9	65.53	9	99.02
10	Mariia Ignateva / Danijil Szemko	Hungary	147.40	10	57.57	10	89.83
