= 2023 Skate Canada International =

Figure skating competition

- Type: Grand Prix
- Date: October 27 – 29
- Season: 2023–24
- Location: Vancouver, British Columbia, Canada
- Host: Skate Canada
- Venue: Thunderbird Sports Centre

Champions
- Men's singles: (Japan) Sōta Yamamoto
- Women's singles: (Japan) Kaori Sakamoto
- Pairs: (Canada) Deanna Stellato-Dudek / Maxime Deschamps
- Ice dance: (Canada) Piper Gilles / Paul Poirier
- Previous: 2022 Skate Canada International
- Next: 2024 Skate Canada International
- Previous Grand Prix: 2023 Skate America
- Next Grand Prix: 2023 Grand Prix de France

The 2023 Skate Canada International was the second event of the 2023–24 ISU Grand Prix of Figure Skating: a senior-level international invitational competition series. It was held at the Doug Mitchell Thunderbird Sports Centre in Vancouver, British Columbia, from October 27–29. Medals were awarded in men's singles, women's singles, pair skating, and ice dance. Skaters also earned points toward qualifying for the 2023–24 Grand Prix Final.

== Entries ==
The International Skating Union announced the preliminary assignments on June 28, 2023.

Country	Men	Women	Pairs	Ice dance
Australia			Anastasia Golubeva / Hektor Giotopoulos Moore	
Canada	Wesley Chiu; Conrad Orzel; Aleksa Rakic	Sara-Maude Dupuis; Kaiya Ruiter; Madeline Schizas	Kelly Ann Laurin / Loucas Éthier; Brooke McIntosh / Benjamin Mimar; Deanna Stellato-Dudek & Maxime Deschamps	Alicia Fabbri / Paul Ayer; Piper Gilles / Paul Poirier; Molly Lanaghan / Dmitre Razgulajevs
China				Wang Shiyue / Liu Xinyu
Estonia	Mihhail Selevko			
France		Maé-Bérénice Méité		
Germany			Letizia Roscher / Luis Schuster	Jennifer Janse van Rensburg / Benjamin Steffan
Great Britain				Lilah Fear / Lewis Gibson
Hungary			Maria Pavlova / Alexei Sviatchenko	
Israel	Mark Gorodnitsky			
Italy	Matteo Rizzo	Lara Naki Gutmann	Lucrezia Beccari / Matteo Guarise	
Japan	Kao Miura; Kazuki Tomono; Sōta Yamamoto	Rino Matsuike; Kaori Sakamoto; Rinka Watanabe		
Kazakhstan	Mikhail Shaidorov			
Lithuania				Allison Reed / Saulius Ambrulevičius
Netherlands			Daria Danilova / Michel Tsiba	
South Korea	Cha Jun-hwan	Kim Chae-yeon		
United States	Liam Kapeikis	Starr Andrews; Audrey Shin; Lindsay Thorngren		Oona Brown / Gage Brown; Eva Pate / Logan Bye; Emilea Zingas / Vadym Kolesnik

== Changes to preliminary assignments ==
Discipline	Withdrew		Added		Notes	Ref.
Discipline	Date	Skater(s)	Date	Skater(s)	Notes	Ref.
Women	August 24	(Germany) Nicole Schott	August 31	(France) Maé-Bérénice Méité	Break from competition	
Women	September 28	(Japan) Rika Kihira	September 29	(Japan) Rino Matsuike	Injury	
Men	October 13	(Canada) Roman Sadovsky	October 16	(Canada) Aleksa Rakic		

== Results ==
=== Men's singles ===
Rank	Skater	Nation	Total points	SP		FS	
1st place, gold medalist(s)	Sōta Yamamoto	Japan	258.42	1	89.56	3	168.86
2nd place, silver medalist(s)	Kao Miura	Japan	257.89	4	80.80	1	177.09
3rd place, bronze medalist(s)	Matteo Rizzo	Italy	246.01	8	74.99	2	171.02
4	Kazuki Tomono	Japan	245.12	3	81.63	5	163.49
5	Mikhail Shaidorov	Kazakhstan	241.65	5	79.18	4	165.47
6	Mark Gorodnitsky	Israel	225.35	11	70.69	6	156.66
7	Wesley Chiu	Canada	221.54	7	76.94	8	144.60
8	Liam Kapeikis	United States	220.15	10	71.59	7	148.56
9	Cha Jun-hwan	South Korea	216.61	2	86.18	11	130.43
10	Conrad Orzel	Canada	213.22	6	77.68	10	135.44
11	Mihhail Selevko	Estonia	210.78	12	70.18	9	140.60
12	Aleksa Rakic	Canada	189.38	9	72.56	12	116.82

=== Women's singles ===
Rank	Skater	Nation	Total points	SP		FS	
1st place, gold medalist(s)	Kaori Sakamoto	Japan	226.13	1	75.13	1	151.00
2nd place, silver medalist(s)	Kim Chae-yeon	South Korea	201.15	2	70.31	4	130.84
3rd place, bronze medalist(s)	Rino Matsuike	Japan	198.62	3	66.29	3	132.33
4	Madeline Schizas	Canada	189.91	8	57.44	2	132.47
5	Lindsay Thorngren	United States	189.52	5	61.99	5	127.53
6	Rinka Watanabe	Japan	182.08	7	57.52	6	124.56
7	Audrey Shin	United States	177.14	4	65.19	9	111.95
8	Starr Andrews	United States	174.82	6	61.07	8	113.75
9	Lara Naki Gutmann	Italy	165.73	11	50.00	7	115.73
10	Kaiya Ruiter	Canada	155.44	9	55.82	11	99.62
11	Sara-Maude Dupuis	Canada	151.95	10	52.17	10	99.78
12	Maé-Bérénice Méité	France	121.13	12	41.65	12	79.48

=== Pairs ===
Rank	Team	Nation	Total points	SP		FS	
1st place, gold medalist(s)	Deanna Stellato-Dudek / Maxime Deschamps	Canada	214.64	1	72.25	1	142.39
2nd place, silver medalist(s)	Maria Pavlova / Alexei Sviatchenko	Hungary	187.78	4	62.22	2	125.56
3rd place, bronze medalist(s)	Lucrezia Beccari / Matteo Guarise	Italy	181.42	2	65.83	4	115.59
4	Anastasia Golubeva / Hektor Giotopoulos Moore	Australia	179.61	3	62.80	3	116.81
5	Kelly Ann Laurin / Loucas Éthier	Canada	168.12	7	57.14	5	110.98
6	Brooke McIntosh / Benjamin Mimar	Canada	166.00	5	59.83	7	106.17
7	Daria Danilova / Michel Tsiba	Netherlands	165.01	6	57.17	6	107.84
8	Letizia Roscher / Luis Schuster	Germany	137.54	8	52.07	8	85.47

=== Ice dance ===
Rank	Team	Nation	Total points	RD		FD	
1st place, gold medalist(s)	Piper Gilles / Paul Poirier	Canada	219.01	1	87.55	1	131.46
2nd place, silver medalist(s)	Lilah Fear / Lewis Gibson	Great Britain	209.55	2	83.51	2	126.04
3rd place, bronze medalist(s)	Allison Reed / Saulius Ambrulevičius	Lithuania	192.01	3	75.60	3	116.41
4	Oona Brown / Gage Brown	United States	187.62	4	73.91	4	113.71
5	Emilea Zingas / Vadym Kolesnik	United States	184.96	5	72.25	5	112.71
6	Eva Pate / Logan Bye	United States	181.46	6	72.12	6	109.34
7	Alicia Fabbri / Paul Ayer	Canada	173.34	7	68.31	8	105.03
8	Jennifer Janse van Rensburg / Benjamin Steffan	Germany	172.52	8	66.14	7	106.38
9	Molly Lanaghan / Dmitre Razgulajevs	Canada	168.79	9	65.97	9	102.82
10	Wang Shiyue / Liu Xinyu	China	160.61	10	64.66	10	95.95
