= Maria Pavlova (figure skater) =

Russian-Hungarian pair skater (born 2004)

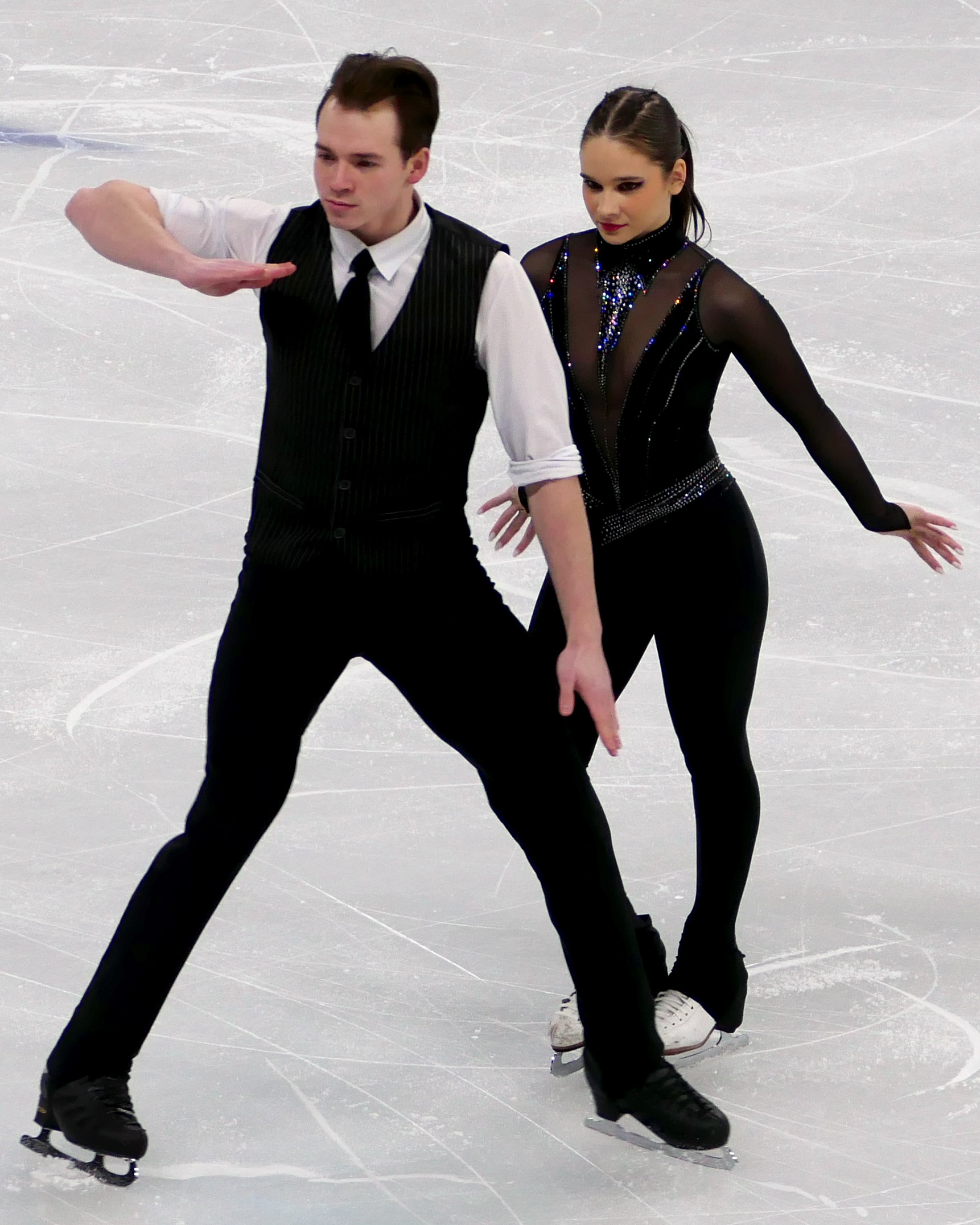
- Maria Pavlova and Alexei Sviatchenko at the 2024 World Championships

Personal information
- Native name: Мария Евгеньевна Павлова (Russian)
- Full name: Maria Evgenievna Pavlova
- Born: 2 August 2004 (age 22) Moscow, Russia
- Height: 1.54 m (5 ft 1 in)

Figure skating career
- Country: Hungary (since 2021); Russia (2017–19)
- Discipline: Pair skating (since 2021); Women's singles (2017–19)
- Partner: Alexei Sviatchenko (since 2022); Balázs Nagy (2021–22)
- Coach: Dmitri Savin; Fedor Klimov; Sofia Evdokimova; Gurgen Vardanjan
- Skating club: Sebestyén KSE
- Began skating: 2009

Medal record
Representing Hungary
European Championships
Bronze medal – third place	2026 Sheffield	Pairs
Hungarian Championships
Gold medal – first place	2023 Budapest	Pairs
Gold medal – first place	2024 Turnov	Pairs
Gold medal – first place	2026 Presov	Pairs
Silver medal – second place	2022 Spišská Nová Ves	Pairs

Maria Evgenievna Pavlova (Russian: Мария Евгеньевна Павлова; born 2 August 2004) is a Russian and Hungarian pair skater who currently competes for Hungary. With her current skating partner, Alexei Sviatchenko, she is the 2026 European bronze medalist, a five-time ISU Grand Prix medalist, two-time ISU Challenger Series medalist, and three-time Hungarian national champion (2023–24, 2026).

With her former partner, Balázs Nagy, Pavlova is the 2022 Hungarian national silver medalist and finished 11th at the 2022 European Championships.

== Personal life ==
Pavlova was born on 2 August 2004 in Moscow, Russia. When she was ten years old, Pavlova, her mother, and older sister moved to Toronto, Canada, due to her sister attending university there. Pavlova and her mother returned to Russia after two years, while her sister remained in Canada. Pavlova went on to become a Hungarian citizen in February 2022.

She is fluent in both Russian and English, and has some understanding of Hungarian.

== Career ==
=== Early years ===
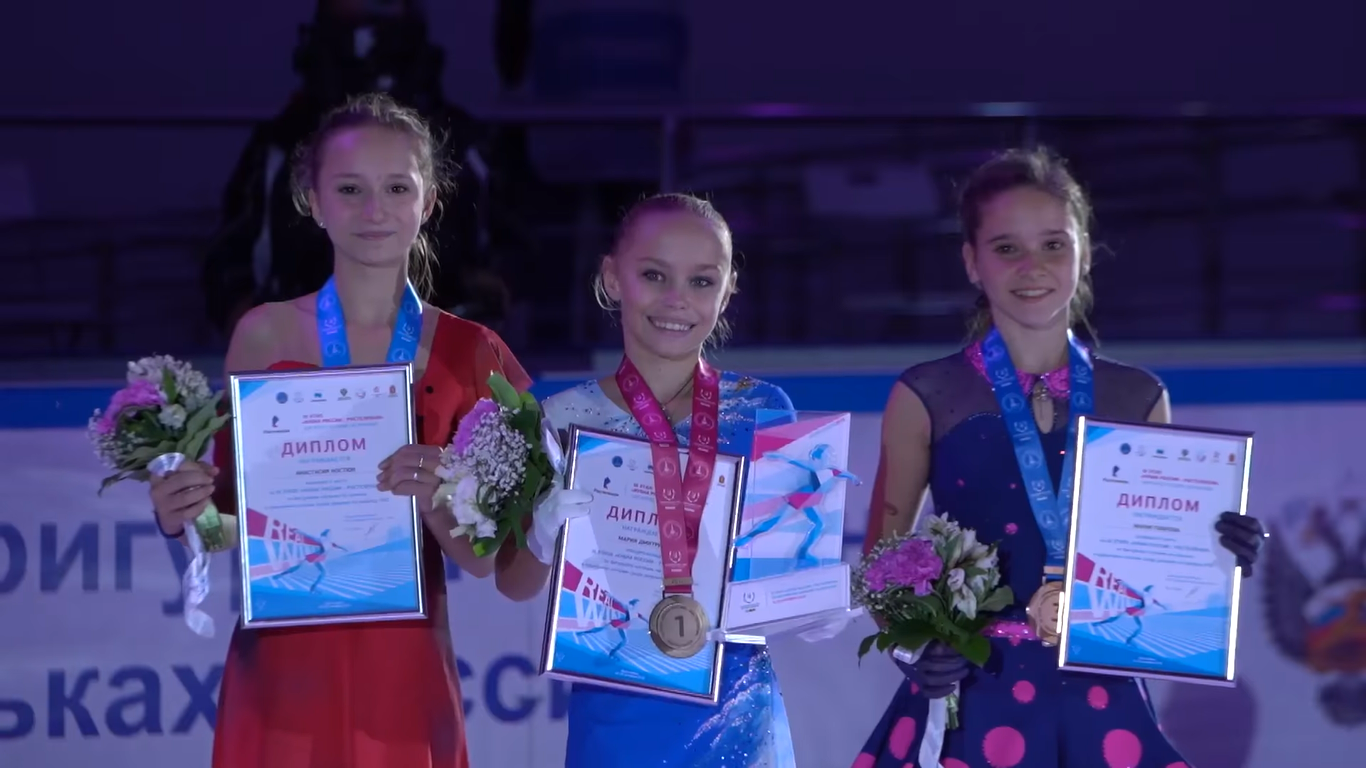
Pavlova (far right) on the podium at the 2018 Russian Cup

Pavlova began figure skating in 2009. Her family lived in Canada for two years during her childhood, during which time she trained at the Toronto Cricket, Skating & Curling Club under Brian Orser. As a singles skater, she competed at two Russian Championships (2018 and 2019). Her first pair partner was Ilia Spiridonov, though they never competed together internationally.

=== Partnership with Balázs Nagy ===
==== 2021–2022 season ====
In September 2021, it was announced that Pavlova had teamed up with Hungarian pair skater, Balázs Nagy and that they would represent Hungary together, coached by Dmitri Savin and Fedor Klimov.

Making their debut at the Budapest Trophy, where they were seventh, they then competed twice on the Challenger series, finishing fifth at the 2021 CS Denis Ten Memorial Challenge and thirteenth at the 2021 CS Golden Spin of Zagreb.

After winning the silver medal at the 2022 Four National Championships and the Hungarian Championships, Pavlova/Nagy made their debut at the European Championships, finishing eleventh.

=== Partnership with Alexei Sviatchenko ===
==== 2022–23 season: Debut of Pavlova/Sviatchenko, first national title ====
In November 2022, it was announced that Pavlova's partnership with Nagy had dissolved and that she would continue to represent Hungary with fellow Russian-born pair skater Alexei Sviatchenko. They were coached by Dmitri Savin and Fedor Klimov and primarily train in Sochi due to the shortage of elite-level training rinks for pair skaters in Hungary.

Pavlova dealt with injuries that caused them to miss the early part of their first season together. The pair made their debut at the 2022 CS Golden Spin of Zagreb, finishing ninth. Pavlova/Sviatchenko went on to win gold at the 2023 Four National Championships and the 2023 Hungarian Championships.

At the 2023 European Championships in Espoo, Finland, Pavlova/Sviatchenko skated two clean programs, placing sixth in the short program and fourth in the free skate, finishing in fifth place overall. They then competed at the 2023 Bavarian Open and the 2023 International Challenge Cup, taking gold and silver, respectively.

At the 2023 World Championships in Saitama, Japan, Pavlova/Sviatchenko delivered two strong performances, placing eighth in the short program and seventh in the free skate, finishing in seventh-place overall. Their results were the best for a team representing Hungary in decades.

==== 2023–24 season: Grand Prix medalists ====
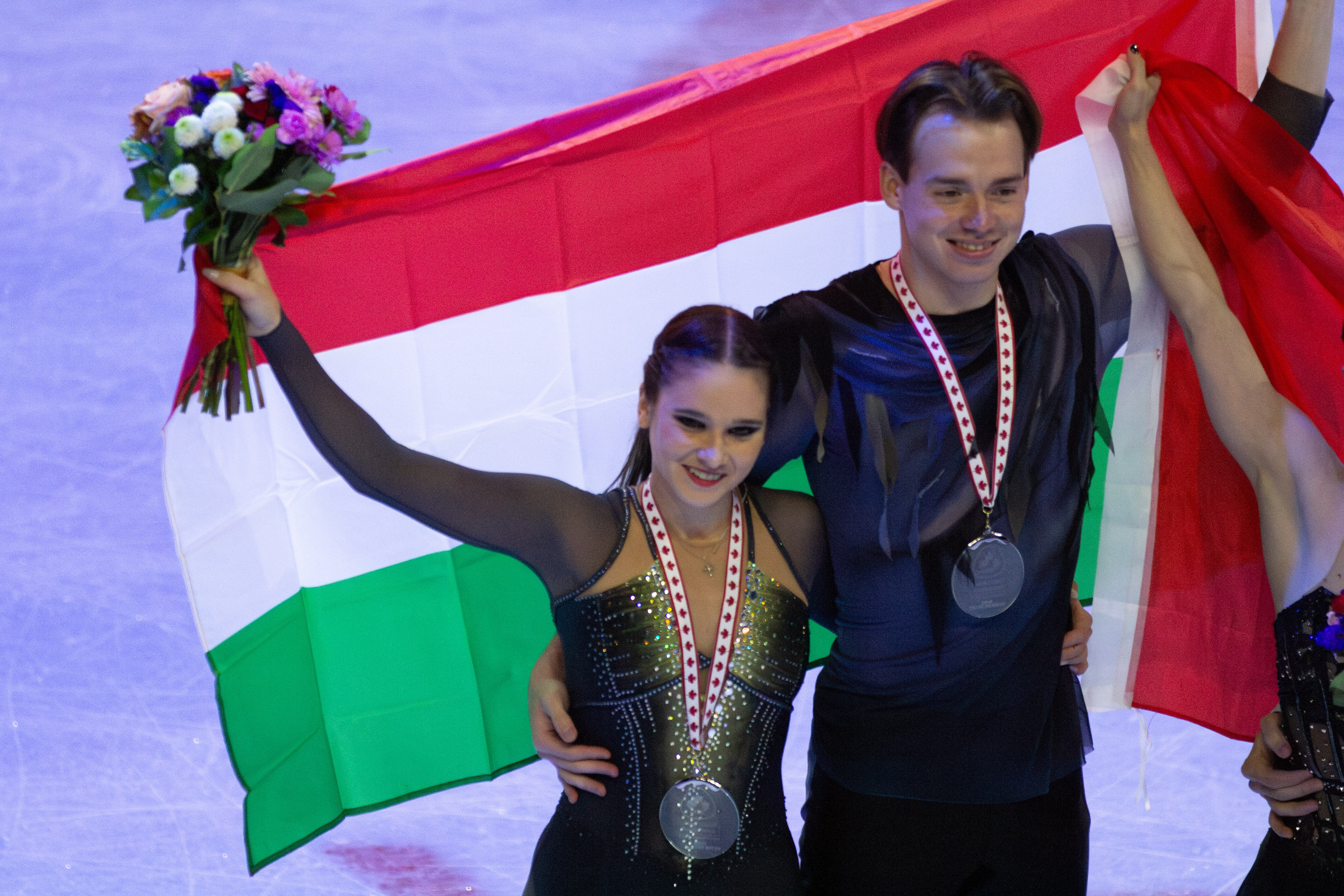
Pavlova and Sviatchenko at 2023 Skate Canada International

Pavlova/Sviatchenko competed twice on the Challenger circuit to begin the season, coming fifth at the 2023 CS Nebelhorn Trophy before winning the bronze medal at the 2023 CS Finlandia Trophy. They were then invited to make their Grand Prix debut at the 2023 Skate Canada International, where they finished fourth in the short program after a spin error. They then moved up to second after the free skate, taking the silver medal. This was the first ever Grand Prix medal for a pair representing Hungary, and the first in any discipline since Júlia Sebestyén's bronze medal at the 2009 Skate America.

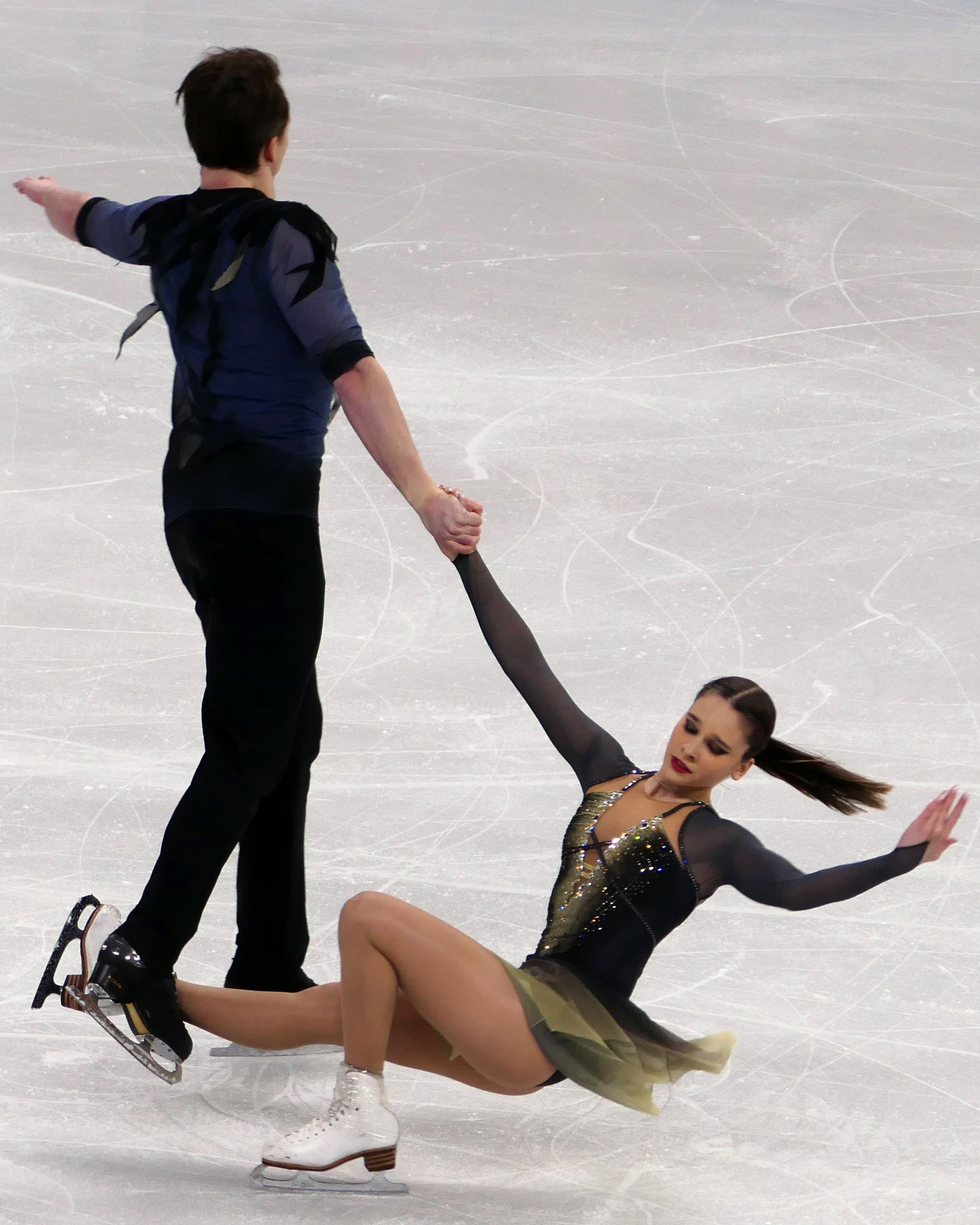
Pavlova and Sviatchenko perform a pair spin during their free skate at the 2024 World Championships

They were again fourth in the short program at the 2023 Grand Prix of Espoo, but another second-place free skate won them the bronze medal.

The team's results on the Grand Prix initially had them finishing as first alternates to the Grand Prix Final. They were called up to compete at the Beijing event following the withdrawal of German team Hocke/Kunkel, and came in fourth at the event.

Pavlova/Sviatchenko competed next at the 2024 European Championships, finishing fourth in the short program, less than two points back of third place. They came third in the free skate, winning a bronze small medal, but remained fourth overall, 1.66 points behind bronze medalists Ghilardi/Ambrosini of Italy. They expressed dissatisfaction with the judging of their performances, with Pavlova saying "our motivation goes down every time we keep getting these scores."

Finishing the season at the 2024 World Championships in Montreal, Pavlova/Sviatchenko came sixth in the short program. They moved up to fourth after the free skate, which she called "very motivating for next season."

==== 2024–25 season: Grand Prix silver ====
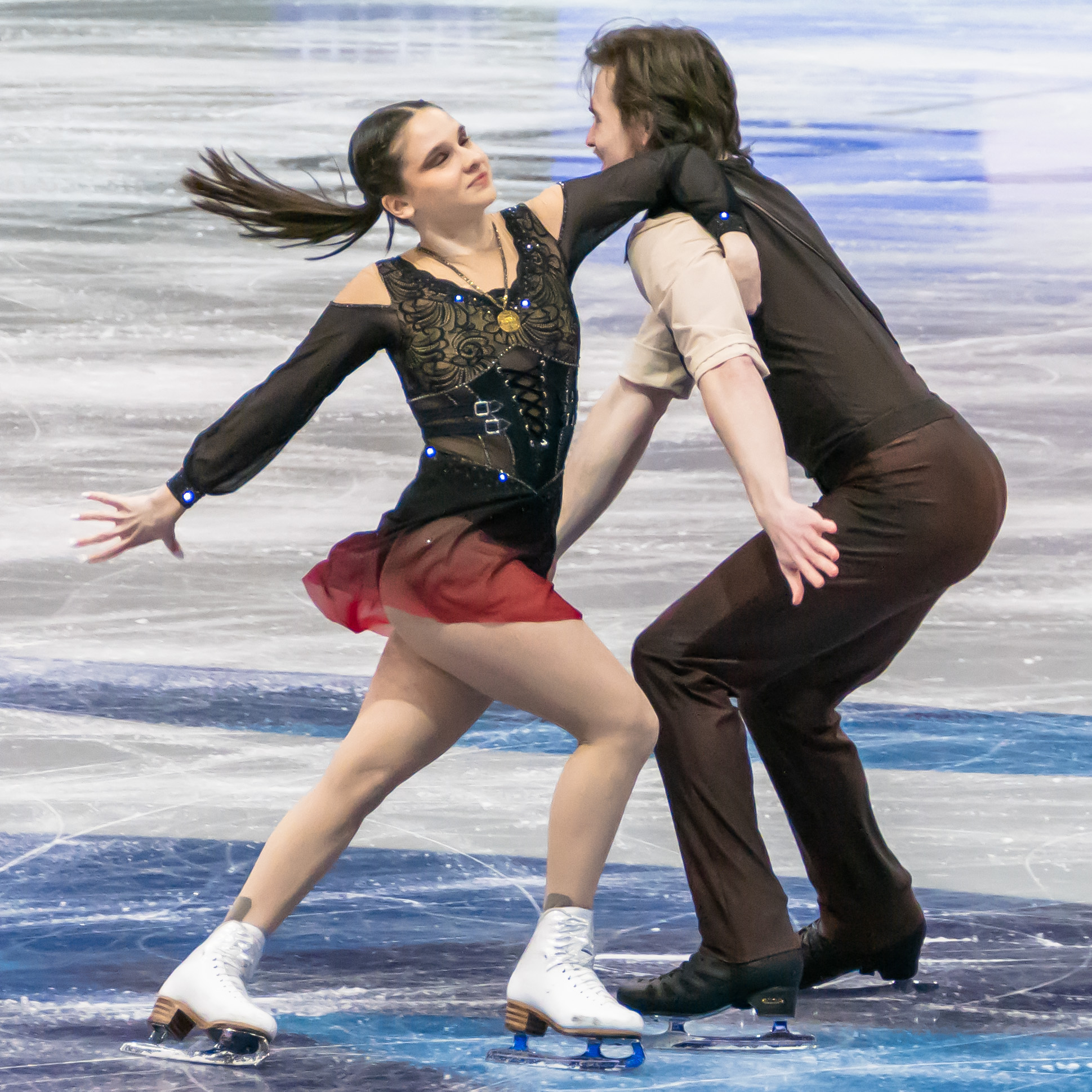
Pavlova and Sviatchenko performing their free skate at the 2025 World Championships

Pavlova and Sviatchenko began the season by competing at the 2024 Lombardia Trophy and the 2024 Shanghai Trophy, where they won bronze and gold, respectively.

Going on to compete on the 2024–25 Grand Prix series, they placed fifth at 2024 Skate America. “This wasn’t our best skate for sure," said Pavlova. "We were both a bit sick ahead of this competition. We have some time now to regroup and will be better at the next competition.” They went on to take silver at the 2024 Finlandia Trophy. Pavlova said after the event that Sviatchenko was dealing with a back injury and were not able to practice lifts before coming into the event. "I am surprised that our scores are still higher than at Skate America," she said. "We know though that the judges don’t forgive any mistakes, and we need to practice more.”

Going on to compete at the 2025 European Championships in Tallinn, Estonia, Pavlova/Sviatchenko placed third in the short program and fourth in the free skate, finishing fourth overall, only 0.44 points behind bronze medalists, Metelkina/Berulava. The following month, they competed at the 2025 World Championships in Boston, Massachusetts, United States, where the placed eighth overall after finishing sixth in the short program and eighth in the free skate.

==== 2025–26 season: European bronze, Milano Cortina Olympics ====
Pavlova and Sviatchenko opened the 2025–26 season with a bronze medal at 2025 Grand Prix de France. "We were just really happy to be here, to start the season, and to compete again so we weren't really thinking about medaling," said Pavlova.

Three weeks later, the team took silver at 2025 NHK Trophy, posting a new personal best in both the short program and total score. "I think we are working in the right direction and we just want to continue to improve on everything," said Pavlov. "But we are very happy with the results and our second place.”

The following month, Pavlova and Sviatchenko placed fifth overall at the 2025–26 Grand Prix Final. "We're feeling good," said Pavlova after the free skate. "It was our first clean skate this season, and we're proud of that. We're going in the right direction forward."

In January, the team won the bronze medal at the 2026 European Championships, becoming the first Hungarian pair team to medal since Marianna Nagy and László Nagy in 1957 and the first skaters from Hungary to medal since Júlia Sebestyén in 2004. "It's been a long time since pairs' for Hungary earned a medal," noted Pavlova. "So, I think it's a big achievement for us and for the country. It's an amazing feeling!"

The following month, Pavlova and Sviatchenko placed fourth overall at the 2026 Winter Olympics in their debut at this event. The team earned new personal best scores in each segment at this event, and said: “We’re very proud because a lot of people from Hungary are supporting us,” said Pavlova. “Yesterday I got a lot of messages from Hungarian fans, and it made us feel very proud. I think they’re proud of us for what we achieved out there, and we hope that more people will start figure skating in Hungary and that there will be more pairs for sure.”

In March, Pavlova and Sviatchenko competed at the 2026 World Figure Skating Championships where they placed fifth. The team finished fourth in the short program and sixth in the free skate. “I’m truly exhausted,” said Pavlova after the short program. “This was our first experience to be at the Olympics and then Worlds after the Olympics. I think we always questioned why people withdraw from Worlds after the Olympics. It happens every four years, and we didn’t know why. But now that we experienced it, we understand—because you gave it your all. You gave 100 percent."

== Programs ==
=== Pair skating with Alexei Sviatchenko (for Hungary) ===
Season	Short program	Free skating	Exhibition
2022–23	I See Red by Everybody Loves an Outlaw choreo. by Sofia Evdokimova	Angel by Tokio Myers; Somebody to Love by Queen choreo. by Sofia Evdokimova	Big Spender (from Sweet Charity) by Cy Coleman & Dorothy Fields choreo. by Sofia Evdokimova
2023–24	Another One Bites the Dust by Queen choreo. by Sofia Evdokimova	My Perception of Love by Benjamin Amaru; Iron 2021 by Woodkid choreo. by Sofia Evdokimova	Austin Powers; The "Shag-adelic" Austin Powers Score Medley by George S. Clinton; Shining Star by Earth, Wind & Fire; Hey Goldmember by Beyoncé; Soul Bossa Nova by Quincy Jones
2024–25	Kiss by Prince performed by Tom Jones; Sex Bomb by Tom Jones performed by Tom Jones & Froro choreo. by Sofia Evdokimova	Pirates of the Caribbean; Hoist Your Colours; The Medallion Calls; Up Is Down; Guilty of Being Jack Sparrow; Marry Me by Hans Zimmer & Klaus Badelt choreo. by Sofia Evdokimova	24K Magic by Bruno Mars; U Can't Touch This by MC Hammer; Hips Don't Lie by Shakira ft. Wyclef Jean; Single Ladies (Put a Ring on It) by Beyoncé; Boombastic by Shaggy; Pump It by Black Eyed Peas; Money, Money, Money by ABBA
2025–26	Earth Song by Michael Jackson choreo. by Luca Lanotte	Without You by Ursine Vulpine & Annaca choreo. by Benoît Richaud	Kiss by Prince performed by Tom Jones; Sex Bomb by Tom Jones performed by Tom Jones & Froro choreo. by Sofia Evdokimova

=== Pair skating with Balázs Nagy (for Hungary) ===
Season	Short program	Free skating
2021–22	Big Spender (from Sweet Charity) by Cy Coleman and Dorothy Fields choreo. by Sofia Evdokimova	The Mask of Zorro by James Horner choreo. by Sofia Evdokimova

== Competitive highlights ==
- GP – Event of the ISU Grand Prix Series
- CS – Event of the ISU Challenger Series
- TBD – Assigned
- WD – Withdrew from competition

=== Pair skating with Alexei Sviatchenko (for Hungary) ===
Competition placements at senior level
Season	2022–23	2023–24	2024–25	2025–26
Winter Olympics				4th
World Championships	7th	4th	8th	5th
European Championships	5th	4th	4th	3rd
Grand Prix Final		4th		5th
Hungarian Championships	1st	1st		1st
Four Nationals Championships	1st	1st		1st
GP Finland		3rd	2nd	
GP France				3rd
GP NHK Trophy				2nd
GP Skate America			5th	
GP Skate Canada		2nd		
CS Finlandia Trophy		3rd		
CS Golden Spin of Zagreb	9th			
CS Lombardia Trophy			3rd	
CS Nebelhorn Trophy		5th		
Bavarian Open	1st			
Budapest Trophy		2nd		
Challenge Cup	2nd			
Shanghai Trophy			1st	

=== Pair skating with Balázs Nagy (for Hungary) ===
Competition placements at senior level
Season	2021–22
European Championships	11th
Hungarian Championships	2nd
Four Nationals Championships	2nd
CS Golden Spin of Zagreb	13th
Budapest Trophy	7th
Denis Ten Memorial	5th

=== Single skating (for Russia) ===
Competition placements at junior level
Season	2017–18	2018–19
Russian Championships	18th	17th

== Detailed results ==
=== Pair skating with Alexei Sviatchenko (for Hungary) ===
ISU personal best scores in the +5/-5 GOE System
Segment	Type	Score	Event
Total	TSS	215.26	2026 Winter Olympics
Short program	TSS	73.87	2026 Winter Olympics
Short program	TES	41.49	2026 European Championships
Short program	PCS	32.64	2025 NHK Trophy
Free skating	TSS	141.39	2026 Winter Olympics
Free skating	TES	75.50	2026 Winter Olympics
Free skating	PCS	65.89	2026 Winter Olympics

- Small medals for the short program and free skating are only awarded at ISU Championships.

Results in the 2022–23 season
Date	Event	SP		FS		Total	
Date	Event	P	Score	P	Score	P	Score
Dec 7–10, 2022	(Croatia) 2022 CS Golden Spin of Zagreb	9	53.58	9	97.67	9	151.25
Dec 15–17, 2022	(Hungary) 2023 Four Nationals Championships	1	61.84	1	112.01	1	173.85
Dec 15–17, 2022	(Hungary) 2023 Hungarian Championships (Note: In Hungary, the Hungarian Championships are contested as part of the Four Nationals Championships.)	1	—N/a	1	—N/a	1	—N/a
Jan 25–29, 2023	(Finland) 2023 European Championships	6	57.97	4	115.01	5	172.98
Jan 31 – Feb 5, 2023	(Germany) 2023 Bavarian Open	2	65.07	1	112.71	1	177.78
Feb 23–26, 2023	(Netherlands) 2023 International Challenge Cup	4	58.44	2	115.19	2	173.63
Mar 22–26, 2023	(Japan) 2023 World Championships	8	64.43	7	126.24	7	190.67

Results in the 2023–24 season
Date	Event	SP		FS		Total	
Date	Event	P	Score	P	Score	P	Score
Sep 20–23, 2023	(Germany) 2023 CS Nebelhorn Trophy	5	61.34	5	121.26	5	182.60
Oct 4–8, 2023	(Finland) 2023 CS Finlandia Trophy	3	61.66	4	107.73	3	169.39
Oct 12–15, 2023	(Hungary) 2023 Budapest Trophy	1	63.08	2	129.28	2	192.36
Oct 27–29, 2023	2023 Skate Canada International	4	62.22	2	125.56	2	187.78
Nov 10–12, 2023	(Finland) 2023 Grand Prix of Espoo	4	61.53	2	124.66	3	186.19
Dec 7–10, 2023	(China) 2023–24 Grand Prix Final	4	65.51	5	126.51	4	192.02
Dec 14–16, 2023	(Czech Republic) 2024 Four Nationals Championships	1	64.87	1	131.31	1	196.18
Dec 14–16, 2023	(Czech Republic) 2024 Hungarian Championships	1	—N/a	1	—N/a	1	—N/a
Jan 8–14, 2024	(Lithuania) 2024 European Championships	4	65.29	3	128.73	4	194.02
Mar 18–24, 2024	(Canada) 2024 World Championships	6	68.01	4	136.59	4	204.60

Results in the 2024–25 season
Date	Event	SP		FS		Total	
Date	Event	P	Score	P	Score	P	Score
Sep 12–15, 2024	(Italy) 2024 CS Lombardia Trophy	4	66.89	1	129.78	3	196.67
Oct 3–5, 2024	(China) 2024 Shanghai Trophy	1	62.66	1	120.54	1	183.20
Oct 18–20, 2024	(United States) 2024 Skate America	4	65.11	5	118.90	5	184.01
Nov 15–17, 2024	(Finland) 2024 Finlandia Trophy	3	54.33	2	122.92	2	184.21
Jan 28 – Feb 2, 2025	(Estonia) 2025 European Championships	3	65.88	4	125.56	4	191.44
Mar 25–30, 2025	(United States) 2025 World Championships	6	67.45	8	125.84	8	193.29

Results in the 2025–26 season
Date	Event	SP		FS		Total	
Date	Event	P	Score	P	Score	P	Score
Oct 17–19, 2025	2025 Grand Prix de France	3	70.15	3	122.61	3	192.76
Nov 7–9, 2025	(Japan) 2025 NHK Trophy	3	73.04	2	134.24	2	207.28
Dec 4–7, 2025	(Japan) 2025–26 Grand Prix Final	4	72.84	5	135.49	5	208.33
Dec 11–13, 2025	(Slovakia) 2026 Four Nationals Championships	1	76.33	1	137.44	1	213.77
Dec 11–13, 2025	(Hungary) 2026 Hungarian Championships	1	—N/a	1	—N/a	1	—N/a
Jan 13–18, 2026	(United Kingdom) 2026 European Championships	3	73.32	2	129.24	3	202.56
Feb 6–19, 2026	(Italy) 2026 Winter Olympics	4	73.87	3	141.39	4	215.26
Mar 24–29, 2026	(Czech Republic) 2026 World Championships	4	69.92	6	135.16	5	205.08
