= 2023–24 ISU Grand Prix of Figure Skating =

Figure skating competition

2023-24 ISU Grand Prix of Figure Skating
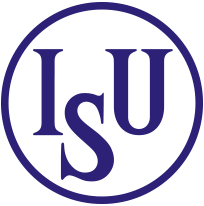
- Type: Grand Prix
- Date: October 20 – December 10, 2023
- Season: 2023–24
- Previous: 2022–23 Grand Prix
- Next: 2024–25 Grand Prix

The 2023–24 ISU Grand Prix of Figure Skating was a series of senior international competitions organized by the International Skating Union that were held from October 2023 through December 2023. Medals were awarded in men's singles, women's singles, pair skating, and ice dance. Skaters earned points based on their placements at each event and the top six in each discipline qualified to compete at the Grand Prix Final in Beijing, China. The corresponding series for junior-level skaters was the 2023–24 ISU Junior Grand Prix.

== Competitions ==
The series included the following events.

Grand Prix competitions
Date	Event	Location	Ref.
October 20–22	(United States) 2023 Skate America	Allen, Texas, United States	Details
October 27–29	2023 Skate Canada International	Vancouver, British Columbia, Canada	Details
November 3–5	2023 Grand Prix de France	Angers, France	Details
November 10–12	2023 Cup of China	Chongqing, China	Details
November 17–20	(Finland) 2023 Grand Prix of Espoo	Espoo, Finland	Details
November 24–26	(Japan) 2023 NHK Trophy	Osaka, Japan	Details
December 7–10	(China) 2023–24 Grand Prix Final	Beijing, China	Details

== Requirements ==
Skaters were eligible to compete on the senior Grand Prix circuit if they had reached the age of 16 before July 1, 2023. They were also required to have earned a minimum total score at certain international events.

== Assignments ==
=== Men's singles ===
Men's assignments
Nation	Skater	Assignment(s)	
Canada	Wesley Chiu	Skate Canada International	NHK Trophy
Canada	Stephen Gogolev	Skate America	Grand Prix de France
China	Jin Boyang	Grand Prix de France	Cup of China
Estonia	Mihhail Selevko	Skate Canada International	NHK Trophy
France	Kévin Aymoz	Skate America	Grand Prix of Espoo
France	Luc Economides	Grand Prix de France	NHK Trophy
France	Adam Siao Him Fa	Grand Prix de France	Cup of China
Georgia	Nika Egadze	Skate America	NHK Trophy
Italy	Gabriele Frangipani	Cup of China	NHK Trophy
Italy	Nikolaj Memola	Grand Prix de France	Grand Prix of Espoo
Italy	Matteo Rizzo	Skate Canada International	Grand Prix of Espoo
Japan	Yuma Kagiyama	Grand Prix de France	NHK Trophy
Japan	Kao Miura	Skate Canada International	Grand Prix of Espoo
Japan	Shun Sato	Skate America	Grand Prix of Espoo
Japan	Koshiro Shimada	Grand Prix de France	Grand Prix of Espoo
Japan	Kazuki Tomono	Skate Canada International	Cup of China
Japan	Tatsuya Tsuboi	Skate America	NHK Trophy
Japan	Shoma Uno	Cup of China	NHK Trophy
Japan	Sōta Yamamoto	Skate Canada International	Cup of China
Kazakhstan	Mikhail Shaidorov	Skate Canada International	Cup of China
Latvia	Deniss Vasiļjevs	Skate America	NHK Trophy
Switzerland	Lukas Britschgi	Grand Prix de France	NHK Trophy
United States	Liam Kapeikis	Skate Canada International	Grand Prix of Espoo
United States	Jimmy Ma	Cup of China	Grand Prix of Espoo
United States	Ilia Malinin	Skate America	Grand Prix de France
United States	Camden Pulkinen	Grand Prix de France	NHK Trophy
Azerbaijan	Vladimir Litvintsev	Skate America	
Canada	Conrad Orzel	Skate Canada International	
Canada	Aleksa Rakic	Skate Canada International	
China	Dai Daiwei	Cup of China	
China	Xu Juwen	Cup of China	
Estonia	Aleksandr Selevko	NHK Trophy	
Estonia	Arlet Levandi	Grand Prix of Espoo	
Finland	Makar Suntsev	Grand Prix of Espoo	
France	Landry Le May	Grand Prix de France	
Germany	Nikita Starostin	Grand Prix of Espoo	
Israel	Mark Gorodnitsky	Skate Canada International	
Japan	Takeru Amine Kataise	Grand Prix de France	
Japan	Nozomu Yoshioka	Skate America	
South Korea	Cha Jun-hwan	Skate Canada International	
South Korea	Lee Si-hyeong	Cup of China	
Sweden	Andreas Nordebäck	Skate America	
United States	Lucas Broussard	Cup of China	
United States	Maxim Naumov	Skate America	
United States	Andrew Torgashev	Skate America	
Ukraine	Ivan Shmuratko	Grand Prix of Espoo	

=== Women's singles ===
Women's assignments
Nation	Skater	Assignment(s)	
Belgium	Loena Hendrickx	Skate America	Cup of China
Belgium	Nina Pinzarrone	Grand Prix de France	NHK Trophy
Canada	Madeline Schizas	Skate Canada International	Cup of China
China	An Xiangyi	Skate America	Cup of China
Estonia	Niina Petrõkina	Skate America	Cup of China
Finland	Janna Jyrkinen	Grand Prix de France	Grand Prix of Espoo
France	Lorine Schild	Grand Prix de France	Grand Prix of Espoo
France	Léa Serna	Grand Prix de France	NHK Trophy
Georgia	Anastasiia Gubanova	Grand Prix de France	NHK Trophy
Italy	Lara Naki Gutmann	Skate Canada International	Grand Prix of Espoo
Japan	Mone Chiba	Skate America	Grand Prix de France
Japan	Wakaba Higuchi	Grand Prix de France	NHK Trophy
Japan	Mana Kawabe	Skate America	Grand Prix of Espoo
Japan	Kaori Sakamoto	Skate Canada International	Grand Prix of Espoo
Japan	Rion Sumiyoshi	Grand Prix de France	Grand Prix of Espoo
Japan	Rinka Watanabe	Skate Canada International	Cup of China
Japan	Hana Yoshida	Skate America	Cup of China
Poland	Ekaterina Kurakova	Skate America	Cup of China
South Korea	Kim Chae-yeon	Skate Canada International	Grand Prix of Espoo
South Korea	Kim Ye-lim	Cup of China	NHK Trophy
South Korea	Lee Hae-in	Grand Prix de France	NHK Trophy
South Korea	Wi Seo-yeong	Skate America	NHK Trophy
South Korea	You Young	Skate America	Grand Prix of Espoo
United States	Starr Andrews	Skate Canada International	Grand Prix of Espoo
United States	Amber Glenn	Skate America	Grand Prix of Espoo
United States	Isabeau Levito	Skate America	Grand Prix de France
United States	Audrey Shin	Skate Canada International	Cup of China
United States	Lindsay Thorngren	Skate Canada International	NHK Trophy
Canada	Sara-Maude Dupuis	Skate Canada International	
Canada	Kaiya Ruiter	Skate Canada International	
China	Chen Hongyi	Cup of China	
China	Zhu Yi	Cup of China	
Finland	Oona Ounasvuori	Grand Prix of Espoo	
Finland	Nella Pelkonen	Grand Prix of Espoo	
France	Maia Mazzara	Grand Prix de France	
France	Maé-Bérénice Méité	Skate Canada International	
Japan	Yuna Aoki	NHK Trophy	
Japan	Rino Matsuike	Skate Canada International	
Japan	Mai Mihara	NHK Trophy	
Netherlands	Lindsay Van Zundert	NHK Trophy	
Switzerland	Kimmy Repond	Grand Prix de France	
United States	Clare Seo	Skate America	
United States	Ava Marie Ziegler	NHK Trophy	

=== Pairs ===
Pairs' assignments
Nation	Team	Assignment(s)	
Australia	Anastasia Golubeva; Hektor Giotopoulos Moore	Skate Canada International	NHK Trophy
Canada	Kelly Ann Laurin; Loucas Ethier	Skate Canada International	NHK Trophy
Canada	Brooke McIntosh; Benjamin Mimar	Skate Canada International	Grand Prix of Espoo
Canada	Lia Pereira; Trennt Michaud	Skate America	Grand Prix de France
Canada	Deanna Stellato-Dudek; Maxime Deschamps	Skate Canada International	Cup of China
China	Peng Cheng; Wang Lei	Cup of China	Grand Prix of Espoo
France	Camille Kovalev; Pavel Kovalev	Grand Prix de France	Grand Prix of Espoo
Germany	Minerva Fabienne Hase; Nikita Volodin	Grand Prix Espoo	NHK Trophy
Germany	Annika Hocke; Robert Kunkel	Skate America	Cup of China
Hungary	Maria Pavlova; Alexei Sviatchenko	Skate Canada International	Grand Prix of Espoo
Italy	Lucrezia Beccari; Matteo Guarise	Skate Canada International	NHK Trophy
Italy	Sara Conti; Niccolò Macii	Grand Prix de France	Grand Prix of Espoo
Italy	Rebecca Ghilardi; Filippo Ambrosini	Cup of China	NHK Trophy
Italy	Anna Valesi; Manuel Piazza	Grand Prix de France	Cup of China
Netherlands	Daria Danilova; Michel Tsiba	Skate Canada International	NHK Trophy
United States	Ellie Kam; Daniel O'Shea	Grand Prix de France	Grand Prix of Espoo
United States	Chelsea Liu; Balázs Nagy	Skate America	NHK Trophy
United States	Valentina Plazas; Maximiliano Fernandez	Skate America	Grand Prix de France
China	Wang Yuchen; Zhu Lei	Cup of China	
China	Zhang Siyang; Yang Yongchao	Cup of China	
Finland	Milania Väänänen; Filippo Clerici	Grand Prix of Espoo	
France	Océane Piegad; Denys Strekalin	Grand Prix de France	
France	Oxana Vouillamoz; Flavien Giniaux	Grand Prix de France	
Germany	Letizia Roscher; Luis Schuster	Skate Canada International	
Great Britain	Anastasia Vaipan-Law; Luke Digby	Skate America	
Italy	Irma Caldara; Riccardo Maglio	Skate America	
Japan	Yuna Nagaoka; Sumitada Moriguchi	NHK Trophy	
United States	Isabelle Martins; Ryan Bedard	Skate America	
United States	Maria Mokhova; Ivan Mokhov	Cup of China	

=== Ice dance ===
Ice dance assignments
Nation	Team	Assignment(s)	
Canada	Laurence Fournier Beaudry; Nikolaj Sørensen	Grand Prix de France	Grand Prix of Espoo
Canada	Piper Gilles; Paul Poirier	Skate Canada International	Cup of China
Canada	Marjorie Lajoie; Zachary Lagha	Skate America	Cup of China
Canada	Marie-Jade Lauriault; Romain Le Gac	Grand Prix de France	NHK Trophy
Czech Republic	Kateřina Mrázková; Daniel Mrázek	Skate America	Grand Prix of Espoo
Finland	Juulia Turkkila; Matthias Versluis	Grand Prix Espoo	NHK Trophy
France	Loïcia Demougeot; Théo le Mercier	Cup of China	NHK Trophy
France	Evgeniia Lopareva; Geoffrey Brissaud	Skate America	Grand Prix de France
Germany	Jennifer Janse van Rensburg; Benjamin Steffan	Skate Canada International	Grand Prix of Espoo
Great Britain	Lilah Fear; Lewis Gibson	Skate Canada International	NHK Trophy
Italy	Charlène Guignard; Marco Fabbri	Grand Prix de France	NHK Trophy
Lithuania	Allison Reed; Saulius Ambrulevičius	Skate Canada International	NHK Trophy
South Korea	Hannah Lim; Ye Quan	Skate America	Grand Prix de France
Spain	Olivia Smart; Tim Dieck	Skate America	Grand Prix de France
United States	Emily Bratti; Ian Somerville	Cup of China	NHK Trophy
United States	Oona Brown; Gage Brown	Skate America	Skate Canada International
United States	Christina Carreira; Anthony Ponomarenko	Grand Prix de France	Grand Prix of Espoo
United States	Madison Chock; Evan Bates	Skate America	Grand Prix of Espoo
United States	Caroline Green; Michael Parsons	Skate America	Cup of China
United States	Lorraine McNamara; Anton Spiridonov	Grand Prix de France	NHK Trophy
United States	Eva Pate; Logan Bye	Skate Canada International	Cup of China
United States	Emilea Zingas; Vadym Kolesnik	Skate Canada International	Grand Prix of Espoo
Australia	Holly Harris; Jason Chan	Skate America	
Canada	Nadiia Bashynska; Peter Beaumont	Grand Prix of Espoo	
Canada	Alicia Fabbri; Paul Ayer	Skate Canada International	
Canada	Molly Lanaghan; Dmitre Razgulajevs	Skate Canada International	
China	Chen Xizi; Xing Jianing	Cup of China	
China	Shi Shang; Wu Nan	Cup of China	
China	Wang Shiyue; Liu Xinyu	Skate Canada International	
Czech Republic	Natálie Taschlerová; Filip Taschler	Skate America	
Finland	Yuka Orihara; Juho Pirinen	Grand Prix of Espoo	
France	Marie Dupayage; Thomas Nabais	Grand Prix de France	
France	Natacha Lagouge; Arnaud Caffa	Grand Prix de France	
Georgia	Maria Kazakova; Georgy Reviya	Cup of China	
Hungary	Mariia Ignateva; Danijil Szemko	Grand Prix of Espoo	
Japan	Misato Komatsubara; Tim Koleto	NHK Trophy	

=== Changes to preliminary assignments ===
==== Skate America ====
Changes to preliminary assignments
Discipline	Withdrew		Added		Notes	Ref.
Discipline	Date	Skater(s)	Date	Skater(s)	Notes	Ref.
Women	—N/a		August 30	(United States); Clare Seo	Host picks	
Pairs	—N/a		August 30	(United States); Chelsea Liu; Balázs Nagy	Host picks	
Pairs	—N/a		September 15	(United States); Evelyn Grace Hanns; Danny Neudecker	Host picks	
Ice dance	—N/a		September 15	(United States); Oona Brown; Gage Brown	Host picks	
Pairs	October 12	(Japan); Riku Miura; Ryuichi Kihara	October 13	(United Kingdom); Anastasia Vaipan-Law; Luke Digby	Back injury (Kihara)	
Pairs	October 13	(United States); Evelyn Grace Hanns; Danny Neudecker	October 13	(United States); Isabelle Martins; Ryan Bedard	Host pick	
Pairs	October 16	(Netherlands); Nika Osipova; Dmitry Epstein	—N/a			

==== Skate Canada International ====
Changes to preliminary assignments
Discipline	Withdrew		Added		Notes	Ref.
Discipline	Date	Skater(s)	Date	Skater(s)	Notes	Ref.
Women	August 24	(Germany); Nicole Schott	August 31	(France); Maé-Bérénice Méité	Break from competition	
Women	September 28	(Japan); Rika Kihira	September 29	(Japan); Rino Matsuike	Injury	
Men	October 13	(Canada); Roman Sadovsky	October 16	(Canada); Aleksa Rakic		

==== Grand Prix de France ====
Changes to preliminary assignments
Discipline	Withdrew		Added		Notes	Ref.
Discipline	Date	Skater(s)	Date	Skater(s)	Notes	Ref.
Women	—N/a		September 11	(France); Maia Mazzara	Host picks	
Women	—N/a		September 11	(France); Lorine Schild	Host picks	
Men	—N/a		September 19	(France); Luc Economides	Host picks	
Men	—N/a		October 2	(France); Landry Le May	Host picks	
Pairs	—N/a		October 2	(France); Oceane Piegad; Denys Strekalin	Host picks	
Ice dance	—N/a		October 2	(France); Natacha Lagouge; Arnaud Caffa	Host picks	
Ice dance	October 23	(United States); Kaitlin Hawayek; Jean-Luc Baker	October 24	(Spain); Olivia Smart; Tim Dieck	Concussion	
Men	October 26	(Italy); Daniel Grassl	October 30	(Canada); Stephen Gogolev		

==== Cup of China ====
Changes to preliminary assignments
Discipline	Withdrew		Added		Notes	Ref.
Discipline	Date	Skater(s)	Date	Skater(s)	Notes	Ref.
Men	—N/a		August 17	(China); Dai Daiwei	Host picks	
Men	—N/a		August 17	(China); Jin Boyang	Host picks	
Men	—N/a		August 17	(China); Zhang He	Host picks	
Women	—N/a		August 17	(China); An Xiangyi	Host picks	
Women	—N/a		August 17	(China); Chen Hongyi	Host picks	
Women	—N/a		August 17	(China); Zhu Yi	Host picks	
Pairs	—N/a		August 17	(China); Peng Cheng; Wang Lei	Host picks	
Pairs	—N/a		August 17	(China); Zhang Siyang; Yang Yongchao	Host picks	
Pairs	—N/a		August 17	(China); Wang Yuchen; Zhu Lei	Host picks	
Ice dance	—N/a		August 17	(China); Wang Shiyue; Liu Xinyu	Host picks	
Ice dance	—N/a		August 17	(China); Chen Xizi; Xing Jianing	Host picks	
Pairs	August 29	(United States); Anastasiia Smirnova; Danylo Siianytsia	September 4	(United States); Maria Mokhova; Ivan Mokhov	Smirnova retired.	
Men	October 13	(China); Zhang He	October 13	(China); Xu Juwen	Injury	
Pairs	October 19	(United States); Emily Chan; Spencer Akira Howe	October 23	(Italy); Anna Valesi; Manuel Piazza		
Women	November 1	(United States); Bradie Tennell	November 2	(Poland); Ekaterina Kurakova		
Ice dance	November 3	(China); Wang Shiyue; Liu Xinyu	November 3	(China); Shi Shang; Wu Nan		
Ice dance	November 3	(Czech Republic); Natálie Taschlerová; Filip Taschler	—N/a			
Women	November 6	(Japan); Mai Mihara	—N/a		Injury	

==== Grand Prix of Espoo ====
Changes to preliminary assignments
Discipline	Withdrew		Added		Notes	Ref.
Discipline	Date	Skater(s)	Date	Skater(s)	Notes	Ref.
Women	—N/a		August 17	(Finland); Janna Jyrkinen	Host picks	
Women	—N/a		August 17	(Finland); Oona Ounasvuori	Host picks	
Women	—N/a		August 17	(Finland); Nella Pelkonen	Host picks	
Men	—N/a		August 24	(United States); Jimmy Ma		
Men	November 6	(Sweden); Andreas Nordebäck	November 7	(United States); Liam Kapeikis		
Women	November 6	(Switzerland); Kimmy Repond	November 8	(Italy); Lara Naki Gutmann	Injury	
Men	November 13	(Azerbaijan); Vladimir Litvintsev	November 14	(Germany); Nikita Starostin		
Men	November 13	(South Korea); Cha Jun-hwan	November 14	(Ukraine); Ivan Shmuratko	Injury	

==== NHK Trophy ====
Changes to preliminary assignments
Discipline	Withdrew		Added		Notes	Ref.
Discipline	Date	Skater(s)	Date	Skater(s)	Notes	Ref.
Women	August 24	(Germany); Nicole Schott	August 31	(United States); Ava Marie Ziegler	Break from competition	
Pairs	August 29	(United States); Anastasiia Smirnova; Danylo Siianytsia	September 8	(Germany); Minerva Fabienne Hase; Nikita Volodin	Smirnova retired.	
Men	—N/a		September 6	(Japan); Tatsuya Tsuboi	Host picks	
Women	—N/a		September 6	(Japan); Yuna Aoki	Host picks	
Pairs	—N/a		September 6	(Japan); Yuna Nagaoka; Sumitada Moriguchi	Host picks	
Ice dance	October 25	(United States); Kaitlin Hawayek; Jean-Luc Baker	October 26	(United States); Lorraine McNamara; Anton Spiridonov	Concussion	
Men	October 26	(Italy); Daniel Grassl	October 30	(Canada); Wesley Chiu		
Pairs	October 30	(Japan); Riku Miura; Ryuichi Kihara	October 30	(Italy); Lucrezia Beccari; Matteo Guarise	Injury	
Pairs	October 30	(United States); Emily Chan; Spencer Akira Howe	October 30	(United States); Chelsea Liu; Balazs Nagy	Injury	
Women	November 1	(United States); Bradie Tennell	November 3	(France); Léa Serna		
Men	November 14	(South Korea); Lee Si-hyeong	November 15	(Estonia); Aleksandr Selevko		
Ice dance	November 17	(Georgia (country)); Maria Kazakova; Georgy Reviya	—N/a		Health reasons	

== Medal summary ==
Medal summary
Event	Discipline	Gold	Silver	Bronze
(United States) Skate America	Men	(United States); Ilia Malinin	(France); Kévin Aymoz	(Japan); Shun Sato
(United States) Skate America	Women	(Belgium); Loena Hendrickx	(United States); Isabeau Levito	(Estonia); Niina Petrõkina
(United States) Skate America	Pairs	(Germany); Annika Hocke; Robert Kunkel	(Canada); Lia Pereira; Trennt Michaud	(United States); Chelsea Liu; Balázs Nagy
(United States) Skate America	Ice dance	(United States); Madison Chock; Evan Bates	(Canada); Marjorie Lajoie; Zachary Lagha	(France); Evgeniia Lopareva; Geoffrey Brissaud

Medal summary
Event	Discipline	Gold	Silver	Bronze
Skate Canada International	Men	(Japan); Sōta Yamamoto	(Japan); Kao Miura	(Italy); Matteo Rizzo
Skate Canada International	Women	(Japan); Kaori Sakamoto	(South Korea); Kim Chae-yeon	(Japan); Rino Matsuike
Skate Canada International	Pairs	(Canada); Deanna Stellato-Dudek; Maxime Deschamps	(Hungary); Maria Pavlova; Alexei Sviatchenko	(Italy); Lucrezia Beccari; Matteo Guarise
Skate Canada International	Ice dance	(Canada); Piper Gilles; Paul Poirier	(United Kingdom); Lilah Fear; Lewis Gibson	(Lithuania); Allison Reed; Saulius Ambrulevičius

Medal summary
Event	Discipline	Gold	Silver	Bronze
Grand Prix de France	Men	(France); Adam Siao Him Fa	(United States); Ilia Malinin	(Japan); Yuma Kagiyama
Grand Prix de France	Women	(United States); Isabeau Levito	(Belgium); Nina Pinzarrone	(Japan); Rion Sumiyoshi
Grand Prix de France	Pairs	(Canada); Lia Pereira; Trennt Michaud	(Italy); Sara Conti; Niccolò Macii	(France); Camille Kovalev; Pavel Kovalev
Grand Prix de France	Ice dance	(Italy); Charlène Guignard; Marco Fabbri	(Canada); Laurence Fournier Beaudry; Nikolaj Sørensen	(France); Evgeniia Lopareva; Geoffrey Brissaud

Medal summary
Event	Discipline	Gold	Silver	Bronze
Cup of China	Men	(France); Adam Siao Him Fa	(Japan); Shoma Uno	(Kazakhstan); Mikhail Shaidorov
Cup of China	Women	(Japan); Hana Yoshida	(Japan); Rinka Watanabe	(Belgium); Loena Hendrickx
Cup of China	Pairs	(Canada); Deanna Stellato-Dudek; Maxime Deschamps	(Italy); Rebecca Ghilardi; Filippo Ambrosini	(China); Peng Cheng; Wang Lei
Cup of China	Ice dance	(Canada); Piper Gilles; Paul Poirier	(Canada); Marjorie Lajoie; Zachary Lagha	(United States); Caroline Green; Michael Parsons

Medal summary
Event	Discipline	Gold	Silver	Bronze
(Finland) Grand Prix of Espoo	Men	(Japan); Kao Miura	(Japan); Shun Sato	(France); Kévin Aymoz
(Finland) Grand Prix of Espoo	Women	(Japan); Kaori Sakamoto	(Japan); Rion Sumiyoshi	(United States); Amber Glenn
(Finland) Grand Prix of Espoo	Pairs	(Germany); Minerva Fabienne Hase; Nikita Volodin	(Italy); Sara Conti; Niccolò Macii	(Hungary); Maria Pavlova; Alexei Sviatchenko
(Finland) Grand Prix of Espoo	Ice dance	(United States); Madison Chock; Evan Bates	(Canada); Laurence Fournier Beaudry; Nikolaj Sørensen	(Finland); Juulia Turkkila; Matthias Versluis

Medal summary
Event	Discipline	Gold	Silver	Bronze
(Japan) NHK Trophy	Men	(Japan); Yuma Kagiyama	(Japan); Shoma Uno	(Switzerland); Lukas Britschgi
(Japan) NHK Trophy	Women	(United States); Ava Marie Ziegler	(United States); Lindsay Thorngren	(Belgium); Nina Pinzarrone
(Japan) NHK Trophy	Pairs	(Germany); Minerva Fabienne Hase; Nikita Volodin	(Italy); Lucrezia Beccari; Matteo Guarise	(Italy); Rebecca Ghilardi; Filippo Ambrosini
(Japan) NHK Trophy	Ice dance	(United Kingdom); Lilah Fear; Lewis Gibson	(Italy); Charlène Guignard; Marco Fabbri	(Lithuania); Allison Reed; Saulius Ambrulevičius

Medal summary
Event	Discipline	Gold	Silver	Bronze
(China) Grand Prix Final	Men	(United States); Ilia Malinin	(Japan); Shoma Uno	(Japan); Yuma Kagiyama
(China) Grand Prix Final	Women	(Japan); Kaori Sakamoto	(Belgium); Loena Hendrickx	(Japan); Hana Yoshida
(China) Grand Prix Final	Pairs	(Germany); Minerva Fabienne Hase; Nikita Volodin	(Italy); Sara Conti; Niccolò Macii	(Canada); Deanna Stellato-Dudek; Maxime Deschamps
(China) Grand Prix Final	Ice dance	(United States); Madison Chock; Evan Bates	(Italy); Charlène Guignard; Marco Fabbri	(Canada); Piper Gilles; Paul Poirier

=== Medal standings ===
Medal standings
Rank	Nation	Gold	Silver	Bronze	Total
1	Japan	7	7	6	20
2	United States	7	3	3	13
3	Canada	5	5	2	12
4	Germany	4	0	0	4
5	France	2	1	4	7
6	Italy	1	7	3	11
7	Belgium	1	2	2	5
8	Great Britain	1	1	0	2
9	Hungary	0	1	1	2
10	South Korea	0	1	0	1
11	Lithuania	0	0	2	2
12	China	0	0	1	1
12	Estonia	0	0	1	1
12	Finland	0	0	1	1
12	Kazakhstan	0	0	1	1
12	Switzerland	0	0	1	1
Totals (16 entries)		28	28	28	84

== Qualification ==
At each event, skaters earned points toward qualifying for the Grand Prix Final. Following the sixth event, the top six highest-scoring skaters/teams advanced to the Final. The points earned per placement were as follows:

Placement	Singles	Pairs/Ice dance
1st	15	15
2nd	13	13
3rd	11	11
4th	9	9
5th	7	7
6th	5	5
7th	4	—N/a
8th	3	—N/a

There were originally seven tie-breakers in cases of a tie in overall points:

1. Highest placement at an event. If a skater placed 1st and 3rd, the tiebreaker is the 1st place, and that beats a skater who placed 2nd in both events.
2. Highest combined total scores in both events. If a skater earned 200 points at one event and 250 at a second, that skater would win in the second tie-break over a skater who earned 200 points at one event and 150 at another.
3. Participated in two events.
4. Highest combined scores in the free skating/free dance portion of both events.
5. Highest individual score in the free skating/free dance portion from one event.
6. Highest combined scores in the short program/short dance of both events.
7. Highest number of total participants at the events.

If a tie remained, it was considered unbreakable, and the tied skaters all advanced to the Grand Prix Final.

=== Qualification standings ===
Pts.	Men	Women	Pairs	Ice dance
30	(France); Adam Siao Him Fa	(Japan); Kaori Sakamoto	(Canada); Deanna Stellato-Dudek; Maxime Deschamps; (Germany); Minerva Fabienne Hase; Nikita Volodin	(Canada); Piper Gilles; Paul Poirier; (United States); Madison Chock; Evan Bates
28	(United States); Ilia Malinin; (Japan); Kao Miura	(United States); Isabeau Levito	(Canada); Lia Pereira; Trennt Michaud	(Italy); Charlène Guignard; Marco Fabbri; (United Kingdom); Lilah Fear; Lewis Gibson
26	(Japan); Yuma Kagiyama; (Japan); Shoma Uno	(Belgium); Loena Hendrickx	(Italy); Sara Conti; Niccolò Macii	(Canada); Laurence Fournier Beaudry; Nikolaj Sørensen; (Canada); Marjorie Lajoie; Zachary Lagha
24	(France); Kévin Aymoz; (Japan); Shun Sato	(Japan); Hana Yoshida; (Belgium); Nina Pinzarrone; (Japan); Rion Sumiyoshi	(Germany); Annika Hocke; Robert Kunkel; (Italy); Rebecca Ghilardi; Filippo Ambrosini; (Hungary); Maria Pavlova; Alexei Sviatchenko; (Italy); Lucrezia Beccari; Matteo Guarise	—N/a
22	—N/a	(South Korea); Kim Chae-yeon	—N/a	(Lithuania); Allison Reed; Saulius Ambrulevičius; (France); Evgeniia Lopareva; Geoffrey Brissaud
20	(Japan); Sōta Yamamoto; (Switzerland); Lukas Britschgi; (Italy); Matteo Rizzo	(United States); Lindsay Thorngren; (Estonia); Niina Petrõkina	(China); Peng Cheng; Wang Lei	(Finland); Juulia Turkkila; Matthias Versluis; (United States); Caroline Green; Michael Parsons
18	(Kazakhstan); Mikhail Shaidorov; (Japan); Kazuki Tomono; (Georgia (country)); Nika Egadze	(Japan); Rinka Watanabe; (United States); Amber Glenn; (South Korea); Lee Hae-in	(France); Camille Kovalev; Pavel Kovalev; (Australia); Anastasia Golubeva; Hektor Giotopoulos Moore; (United States); Valentina Plazas; Maximiliano Fernandez	(United States); Christina Carreira; Anthony Ponomarenko
16	—N/a	(Canada); Madeline Schizas	(United States); Chelsea Liu; Balázs Nagy	—N/a
15	—N/a	(United States); Ava Marie Ziegler	—N/a	
14	(United States); Camden Pulkinen	—N/a		(United States); Eva Pate; Logan Bye; (United States); Emilea Zingas; Vadym Kolesnik; (France); Loïcia Demougeot; Théo le Mercier
12	(Italy); Gabriele Frangipani	—N/a		
11	—N/a	(Japan); Rino Matsuike	—N/a	
10	—N/a	(France); Lorine Schild; (Georgia (country)); Anastasiia Gubanova	(Italy); Anna Valesi; Manuel Piazza	(United States); Emily Bratti; Ian Somerville
9	—N/a	(South Korea); Kim Ye-lim	—N/a	(United States); Oona Brown; Gage Brown
8	—N/a	(Poland); Ekaterina Kurakova	—N/a	
7	(Italy); Nikolaj Memola; (Azerbaijan); Vladimir Litvintsev; (China); Jin Boyang	(Japan); Wakaba Higuchi; (Japan); Yuna Aoki	(Netherlands); Daria Danilova; Michel Tsiba; (Canada); Kelly Ann Laurin; Loucas Éthier; (China); Zhang Siyang; Yang Yongchao; (United States); Isabelle Martins; Ryan Bedard; (France); Océane Piegad; Denys Strekalin	(Canada); Marie-Jade Lauriault; Romain Le Gac; (Czech Republic); Natálie Taschlerová; Filip Taschler
5	(France); Luc Economides; (Japan); Koshiro Shimada; (Japan); Nozomu Yoshioka; (Israel); Mark Gorodnitsky	(Japan); Mone Chiba; (Finland); Nella Pelkonen	(Canada); Brooke McIntosh; Benjamin Mimar; (United States); Ellie Kam; Daniel O'Shea (figure skater); (Italy); Irma Caldara; Riccardo Maglio	(Spain); Olivia Smart; Tim Dieck; (South Korea); Hannah Lim; Ye Quan; (Finland); Yuka Orihara; Juho Pirinen
4	(Canada); Stephen Gogolev; (Latvia); Deniss Vasiljevs; (Canada); Wesley Chiu; (United States); Andrew Torgashev; (Germany); Nikita Starostin	(France); Léa Serna; (Italy); Lara Naki Gutmann; (United States); Audrey Shin	—N/a	
3	(Japan); Tatsuya Tsuboi; (United States); Liam Kapeikis; (Estonia); Aleksandr Selevko; (South Korea); Lee Si-hyeong; (Ukraine); Ivan Shmuratko	(Japan); Mana Kawabe; (United States); Starr Andrews; (South Korea); You Young; (Japan); Mai Mihara; (China); Chen Hongyi	—N/a	

=== Qualifiers ===
No.	Men	Women	Pairs	Ice dance
1	(France); Adam Siao Him Fa	(Japan); Kaori Sakamoto	(Canada); Deanna Stellato-Dudek; Maxime Deschamps	(Canada); Piper Gilles; Paul Poirier
2	(United States); Ilia Malinin	(United States); Isabeau Levito	(Germany); Minerva Fabienne Hase; Nikita Volodin	(United States); Madison Chock; Evan Bates
3	(Japan); Kao Miura	(Belgium); Loena Hendrickx	(Canada); Lia Pereira; Trennt Michaud	(Italy); Charlène Guignard; Marco Fabbri
4	(Japan); Yuma Kagiyama	(Japan); Hana Yoshida	(Italy); Sara Conti; Niccolò Macii	(United Kingdom); Lilah Fear; Lewis Gibson
5	(Japan); Shoma Uno	(Belgium); Nina Pinzarrone	(Germany); Annika Hocke; Robert Kunkel	(Canada); Laurence Fournier Beaudry; Nikolaj Sørensen
6	(France); Kévin Aymoz	(Japan); Rion Sumiyoshi	(Italy); Rebecca Ghilardi; Filippo Ambrosini	(Canada); Marjorie Lajoie; Zachary Lagha

Alternates

No.	Men	Women	Pairs	Ice dance
1	(Japan); Shun Sato	(South Korea); Kim Chae-yeon	(Hungary); Maria Pavlova; Alexei Sviatchenko	(Lithuania); Allison Reed; Saulius Ambrulevičius
2	(Japan); Sōta Yamamoto	(United States); Lindsay Thorngren	(Italy); Lucrezia Beccari; Matteo Guarise	(France); Evgeniia Lopareva; Geoffrey Brissaud
3	(Switzerland); Lukas Britschgi	(Estonia); Niina Petrõkina	(China); Peng Cheng; Wang Lei	(Finland); Juulia Turkkila; Matthias Versluis

== Records and achievements ==
=== Achievements ===
- At the 2023 Skate America, Niina Petrõkina won Estonia's first ever Grand Prix medal (a bronze medal) at the senior level in any discipline .
- At the 2023 Skate Canada International, Deanna Stellato-Dudek became the oldest skater (at age 40) to win a Grand Prix gold medal in any discipline.
- At the 2023 Skate Canada International, Maria Pavlova and Alexei Sviatchenko won Hungary's first ever Grand Prix medal in pairs (a silver medal) at either the senior or junior level.
- At the Grand Prix Final, Ilia Malinin successfully performed a quadruple Axel during his short program; this was the first time that any skater had ever performed this jump during a short program. Malinin had successfully performed quadruple Axels in previous competitions, but only during the free skate segment. Additionally, during the free skate, Malinin successfully performed a quadruple loop, thus becoming the first skater to ever perform all six jumps as quadruples in competition, though not in the same competition.

== Top scores ==
=== Men's singles ===
Top 10 best scores in the men's combined total
No.	Skater	Nation	Score	Event
1	Ilia Malinin	United States	314.66	2023–24 Grand Prix Final
2	Adam Siao Him Fa	France	306.78	2023 Grand Prix de France
3	Shoma Uno	Japan	297.34	2023–24 Grand Prix Final
4	Yuma Kagiyama	Japan	288.65	2023–24 Grand Prix Final
5	Kévin Aymoz	France	279.09	2023 Skate America
6	Kao Miura	Japan	274.56	2023 Grand Prix of Espoo
7	Shun Sato	Japan	273.34	2023 Grand Prix of Espoo
8	Mikhail Shaidorov	Kazakhstan	264.46	2023 Cup of China
9	Lukas Britschgi	Switzerland	263.43	2023 Grand Prix de France
10	Sōta Yamamoto	Japan	258.42	2023 Skate Canada International

Top 10 best scores in the men's short program
No.	Skater	Nation	Score	Event
1	Ilia Malinin	United States	106.90	2023–24 Grand Prix Final
2	Shoma Uno	Japan	106.02	2023–24 Grand Prix Final
3	Yuma Kagiyama	Japan	105.51	2023 NHK Trophy
4	Adam Siao Him Fa	France	101.07	2023 Grand Prix de France
5	Kévin Aymoz	France	97.34	2023 Skate America
6	Kao Miura	Japan	94.86	2023–24 Grand Prix Final
7	Shun Sato	Japan	91.61	2023 Skate America
8	Mikhail Shaidorov	Kazakhstan	89.94	2023 Cup of China
9	Sōta Yamamoto	Japan	89.56	2023 Skate Canada International
10	Jin Boyang	China	87.44	2023 Skate America

Top 10 best scores in the men's free skating
No.	Skater	Nation	Score	Event
1	Ilia Malinin	United States	207.76	2023–24 Grand Prix Final
2	Adam Siao Him Fa	France	207.17	2023 Cup of China
3	Shoma Uno	Japan	191.32	2023–24 Grand Prix Final
4	Yuma Kagiyama	Japan	184.93	2023–24 Grand Prix Final
5	Shun Sato	Japan	182.93	2023 Grand Prix of Espoo
6	Kévin Aymoz	France	181.75	2023 Skate America
7	Kao Miura	Japan	181.02	2023 Grand Prix of Espoo
8	Lukas Britschgi	Switzerland	176.49	2023 Grand Prix de France
9	Mikhail Shaidorov	Kazakhstan	174.52	2023 Cup of China
10	Kazuki Tomono	Japan	171.45	2023 Cup of China

=== Women's singles ===
Top 10 best scores in the women's combined total
No.	Skater	Nation	Score	Event
1	Kaori Sakamoto	Japan	226.13	2023 Skate Canada International
2	Loena Hendrickx	Belgium	221.28	2023 Skate America
3	Isabeau Levito	United States	208.15	2023 Skate America
4	Hana Yoshida	Japan	203.97	2023 Cup of China
5	Rinka Watanabe	Japan	203.22	2023 Cup of China
6	Kim Chae-yeon	South Korea	201.15	2023 Skate Canada International
7	Ava Marie Ziegler	United States	200.50	2023 NHK Trophy
8	Nina Pinzarrone	Belgium	198.80	2023 Grand Prix de France
9	Lindsay Thorngren	United States	198.73	2023 NHK Trophy
10	Rino Matsuike	Japan	198.62	2023 Skate Canada International

Top 10 best scores in the women's short program
No.	Skater	Nation	Score	Event
1	Kaori Sakamoto	Japan	77.35	2023–24 Grand Prix Final
2	Loena Hendrickx	Belgium	75.92	2023 Skate America
3	Isabeau Levito	United States	71.83	2023 Grand Prix de France
4	Amber Glenn	United States	71.45	2023 Skate America
5	Kim Chae-yeon	South Korea	70.31	2023 Skate Canada International
6	Lindsay Thorngren	United States	68.93	2023 NHK Trophy
7	Rion Sumiyoshi	Japan	68.65	2023 Grand Prix of Espoo
8	Anastasiia Gubanova	Georgia	66.73	2023 Grand Prix de France
9	Nina Pinzarrone	Belgium	66.72	2023–24 Grand Prix Final
10	Lee Hae-in	South Korea	66.30	2023 Grand Prix de France

Top 10 best scores in the women's free skating
No.	Skater	Nation	Score	Event
1	Kaori Sakamoto	Japan	151.00	2023 Skate Canada International
2	Loena Hendrickx	Belgium	145.36	2023 Skate America
3	Hana Yoshida	Japan	142.51	2023–24 Grand Prix Final
4	Ava Marie Ziegler	United States	138.46	2023 NHK Trophy
5	Rinka Watanabe	Japan	138.13	2023 Cup of China
6	Isabeau Levito	United States	138.08	2023 Skate America
7	Rion Sumiyoshi	Japan	136.04	2023 Grand Prix de France
8	Amber Glenn	United States	133.78	2023 Grand Prix of Espoo
9	Nina Pinzarrone	Belgium	133.06	2023 Grand Prix de France
10	Madeline Schizas	Canada	132.47	2023 Skate Canada International

=== Pairs ===
Top 10 best scores in the pairs' combined total
No.	Team	Nation	Score	Event
1	Deanna Stellato-Dudek; Maxime Deschamps	Canada	214.64	2023 Skate Canada International
2	Minerva Fabienne Hase; Nikita Volodin	Germany	206.43	2023–24 Grand Prix Final
3	Sara Conti; Niccolò Macii	Italy	205.88	2023–24 Grand Prix Final
4	Lia Pereira; Trennt Michaud	Canada	194.67	2023 Grand Prix de France
5	Rebecca Ghilardi; Filippo Ambrosini	Italy	191.00	2023 Cup of China
6	Lucrezia Beccari; Matteo Guarise	Italy	190.31	2023 NHK Trophy
7	Maria Pavlova; Alexei Sviatchenko	Hungary	187.78	2023 Skate Canada International
8	Peng Cheng; Wang Lei	China	186.16	2023 Grand Prix of Espoo
9	Anastasia Golubeva; Hektor Giotopoulos Moore	Australia	185.39	2023 NHK Trophy
10	Annika Hocke; Robert Kunkel	Germany	184.23	2023 Skate America

Top 10 best scores in the pairs' short program
No.	Team	Nation	Score	Event
1	Minerva Fabienne Hase; Nikita Volodin	Germany	72.56	2023–24 Grand Prix Final
2	Deanna Stellato-Dudek; Maxime Deschamps	Canada	72.25	2023 Skate Canada International
3	Sara Conti; Niccolò Macii	Italy	70.30	2023–24 Grand Prix Final
4	Lucrezia Beccari; Matteo Guarise	Italy	66.77	2023 NHK Trophy
5	Rebecca Ghilardi; Filippo Ambrosini	Italy	66.33	2023 Cup of China
6	Lia Pereira; Trennt Michaud	Canada	65.97	2023 Grand Prix de France
7	Maria Pavlova; Alexei Sviatchenko	Hungary	65.51	2023–24 Grand Prix Final
8	Peng Cheng; Wang Lei	China	65.25	2023 Grand Prix of Espoo
9	Anastasia Golubeva; Hektor Giotopoulos Moore	Australia	64.61	2023 NHK Trophy
10	Annika Hocke; Robert Kunkel	Germany	63.59	2023 Skate America

Top 10 best scores in the pairs' free skating
No.	Team	Nation	Score	Event
1	Deanna Stellato-Dudek; Maxime Deschamps	Canada	142.39	2023 Skate Canada International
2	Sara Conti; Niccolò Macii	Italy	135.58	2023–24 Grand Prix Final
3	Minerva Fabienne Hase; Nikita Volodin	Germany	135.28	2023 NHK Trophy
4	Lia Pereira; Trennt Michaud	Canada	128.70	2023 Grand Prix de France
5	Rebecca Ghilardi; Filippo Ambrosini	Italy	126.94	2023–24 Grand Prix Final
6	Maria Pavlova; Alexei Sviatchenko	Hungary	126.51	2023–24 Grand Prix Final
7	Lucrezia Beccari; Matteo Guarise	Italy	123.54	2023 NHK Trophy
8	Peng Cheng; Wang Lei	China	120.91	2023 Grand Prix of Espoo
9	Anastasia Golubeva; Hektor Giotopoulos Moore	Australia	120.78	2023 NHK Trophy
10	Annika Hocke; Robert Kunkel	Germany	120.64	2023 Skate America

=== Ice dance ===
Top 10 best scores in the combined total (ice dance)
No.	Team	Nation	Score	Event
1	Madison Chock; Evan Bates	United States	221.61	2023–24 Grand Prix Final
2	Piper Gilles; Paul Poirier	Canada	219.01	2023 Skate Canada International
3	Charlène Guignard; Marco Fabbri	Italy	215.51	2023–24 Grand Prix Final
4	Lilah Fear; Lewis Gibson	Great Britain	215.19	2023 NHK Trophy
5	Laurence Fournier Beaudry; Nikolaj Sørensen	Canada	206.32	2023 Grand Prix of Espoo
6	Marjorie Lajoie; Zachary Lagha	Canada	206.02	2023 Cup of China
7	Allison Reed; Saulius Ambrulevičius	Lithuania	196.86	2023 NHK Trophy
8	Juulia Turkkila; Matthias Versluis	Finland	195.80	2023 Grand Prix of Espoo
9	Evgeniia Lopareva; Geoffrey Brissaud	France	193.47	2023 Skate America
10	Caroline Green; Michael Parsons	United States	189.33	2023 Cup of China

Top 10 best scores in the rhythm dance
No.	Team	Nation	Score	Event
1	Madison Chock; Evan Bates	United States	89.15	2023–24 Grand Prix Final
2	Piper Gilles; Paul Poirier	Canada	87.55	2023 Skate Canada International
3	Charlène Guignard; Marco Fabbri	Italy	86.62	2023 Grand Prix de France
4	Lilah Fear; Lewis Gibson	Great Britain	84.93	2023 NHK Trophy
5	Laurence Fournier Beaudry; Nikolaj Sørensen	Canada	82.62	2023 Grand Prix of Espoo
6	Marjorie Lajoie; Zachary Lagha	Canada	82.02	2023 Cup of China
7	Allison Reed; Saulius Ambrulevičius	Lithuania	78.71	2023 NHK Trophy
8	Juulia Turkkila; Matthias Versluis	Finland	77.65	2023 Grand Prix of Espoo
9	Evgeniia Lopareva; Geoffrey Brissaud	France	77.20	2023 Skate America
10	Caroline Green; Michael Parsons	United States	76.07	2023 Cup of China

Top 10 best scores in the free dance
No.	Team	Nation	Score	Event
1	Madison Chock; Evan Bates	United States	132.46	2023–24 Grand Prix Final
2	Piper Gilles; Paul Poirier	Canada	131.46	2023 Skate Canada International
3	Lilah Fear; Lewis Gibson	Great Britain	130.26	2023 NHK Trophy
4	Charlène Guignard; Marco Fabbri	Italy	129.69	2023 NHK Trophy
5	Laurence Fournier Beaudry; Nikolaj Sørensen	Canada	124.17	2023 Grand Prix de France
6	Marjorie Lajoie; Zachary Lagha	Canada	124.00	2023 Cup of China
7	Allison Reed; Saulius Ambrulevičius	Lithuania	118.15	2023 NHK Trophy
7	Juulia Turkkila; Matthias Versluis	Finland	118.15	2023 Grand Prix of Espoo
9	Evgeniia Lopareva; Geoffrey Brissaud	France	116.27	2023 Skate America
10	Christina Carreira; Anthony Ponomarenko	United States	114.18	2023 Grand Prix of Espoo
