= 2023 NHK Trophy =

Figure skating competition

- Type: Grand Prix
- Date: November 24 – 26
- Season: 2023–24
- Location: Osaka, Japan
- Host: Japan Skating Federation
- Venue: Towa Pharmaceutical Ractab Dome

Champions
- Men's singles: (Japan) Yuma Kagiyama
- Women's singles: (United States) Ava Ziegler
- Pairs: (Germany) Minerva Fabienne Hase / Nikita Volodin
- Ice dance: (United Kingdom) Lilah Fear / Lewis Gibson
- Previous: 2022 NHK Trophy
- Next: 2024 NHK Trophy
- Previous Grand Prix: 2023 Grand Prix of Espoo
- Next Grand Prix: 2023–24 Grand Prix Final

The 2023 NHK Trophy was the sixth event of the 2023–24 ISU Grand Prix of Figure Skating: a senior-level international invitational competition series. It was held at the Osaka Prefectural Kadoma Sports Center (Towa Pharmaceutical Ractab Dome) in Osaka, Japan, from November 24–26. Medals were awarded in men's singles, women's singles, pair skating, and ice dance. Skaters earned points toward qualifying for the 2023–24 Grand Prix Final.

== Entries ==
The International Skating Union announced the preliminary assignments on June 28, 2023.

Country	Men	Women	Pairs	Ice dance
Australia			Anastasia Golubeva / Hektor Giotopoulos Moore	
Belgium		Nina Pinzarrone		
Canada	Wesley Chiu		Kelly Ann Laurin / Loucas Éthier	Marie-Jade Lauriault / Romain Le Gac
Estonia	Aleksandr Selevko; Mihhail Selevko			
Finland				Juulia Turkkila / Matthias Versluis
France	Luc Economides	Léa Serna		Loïcia Demougeot / Théo le Mercier
Georgia	Nika Egadze	Anastasiia Gubanova		
Germany			Minerva Fabienne Hase / Nikita Volodin	
Great Britain				Lilah Fear / Lewis Gibson
Italy	Gabriele Frangipani		Lucrezia Beccari / Matteo Guarise; Rebecca Ghilardi / Filippo Ambrosini	Charlène Guignard / Marco Fabbri
Japan	Yuma Kagiyama; Shoma Uno; Tatsuya Tsuboi	Yuna Aoki; Wakaba Higuchi; Mai Mihara	Yuna Nagaoka / Sumitada Moriguchi	Misato Komatsubara / Tim Koleto
Latvia	Deniss Vasiļjevs			
Lithuania				Allison Reed / Saulius Ambrulevičius
Netherlands		Lindsay van Zundert	Daria Danilova / Michel Tsiba	
South Korea		Kim Ye-lim; Lee Hae-in; Wi Seo-yeong		
Switzerland	Lukas Britschgi			
United States	Camden Pulkinen	Lindsay Thorngren; Ava Ziegler	Chelsea Liu / Balazs Nagy	Emily Bratti / Ian Somerville; Lorraine McNamara / Anton Spiridonov

== Changes to preliminary assignments ==
Discipline	Withdrew		Added		Notes	Ref.
Discipline	Date	Skater(s)	Date	Skater(s)	Notes	Ref.
Women	August 24	(Germany) Nicole Schott	August 31	(United States) Ava Marie Ziegler	Break from competition	
Pairs	August 29	(United States) Anastasiia Smirnova / Danylo Siianytsia	September 8	(Germany) Minerva Fabienne Hase / Nikita Volodin	Smirnova retired.	
Men	—N/a		September 6	(Japan) Tatsuya Tsuboi	Host picks	
Women	—N/a		September 6	(Japan) Yuna Aoki	Host picks	
Pairs	—N/a		September 6	(Japan) Yuna Nagaoka / Sumitada Moriguchi	Host picks	
Ice dance	October 25	(United States) Kaitlin Hawayek / Jean-Luc Baker	October 26	(United States) Lorraine McNamara / Anton Spiridonov	Concussion	
Men	October 26	(Italy) Daniel Grassl	October 30	(Canada) Wesley Chiu		
Pairs	October 30	(Japan) Riku Miura / Ryuichi Kihara	October 30	(Italy) Lucrezia Beccari / Matteo Guarise	Injury	
Pairs	October 30	(United States) Emily Chan / Spencer Howe	October 30	(United States) Chelsea Liu / Balazs Nagy	Injury	
Women	November 1	(United States) Bradie Tennell	November 3	(France) Léa Serna		
Men	November 14	(South Korea) Lee Si-hyeong	November 15	(Estonia) Aleksandr Selevko		
Ice dance	November 17	(Georgia (country)) Maria Kazakova / Georgy Reviya	—N/a		Health reasons	

== Results ==
=== Men's singles ===
Rank	Skater	Nation	Total points	SP		FS	
1st place, gold medalist(s)	Yuma Kagiyama	Japan	288.39	1	105.51	2	182.88
2nd place, silver medalist(s)	Shoma Uno	Japan	286.55	2	100.20	1	186.35
3rd place, bronze medalist(s)	Lukas Britschgi	Switzerland	254.60	3	86.42	3	168.18
4	Nika Egadze	Georgia	237.34	7	81.30	4	156.04
5	Camden Pulkinen	United States	229.32	4	86.40	8	142.92
6	Gabriele Frangipani	Italy	227.15	8	78.20	6	148.95
7	Deniss Vasiļjevs	Latvia	221.95	5	82.14	9	139.81
8	Aleksandr Selevko	Estonia	221.43	9	75.85	7	145.58
9	Tatsuya Tsuboi	Japan	216.62	12	64.63	5	151.99
10	Luc Economides	France	211.12	10	74.24	11	136.88
11	Wesley Chiu	Canada	209.16	11	72.02	10	137.14
12	Mihhail Selevko	Estonia	207.58	6	81.31	12	126.27

=== Women's singles ===
Rank	Skater	Nation	Total points	SP		FS	
1st place, gold medalist(s)	Ava Ziegler	United States	200.50	5	62.04	1	138.46
2nd place, silver medalist(s)	Lindsay Thorngren	United States	198.73	1	68.93	3	129.80
3rd place, bronze medalist(s)	Nina Pinzarrone	Belgium	194.66	2	63.44	2	131.22
4	Lee Hae-in	South Korea	188.95	3	62.93	6	126.02
5	Yuna Aoki	Japan	184.46	8	58.28	5	126.18
6	Anastasiia Gubanova	Georgia	184.32	10	55.80	4	128.52
7	Kim Ye-lim	South Korea	183.19	7	59.33	7	123.86
8	Mai Mihara	Japan	172.64	4	62.82	9	109.82
9	Wakaba Higuchi	Japan	165.69	11	52.18	8	113.51
10	Wi Seo-yeong	South Korea	158.15	6	60.63	10	97.52
11	Léa Serna	France	156.04	9	56.85	11	99.19
12	Lindsay van Zundert	Netherlands	125.82	12	43.46	12	82.36

=== Pairs ===
Rank	Team	Nation	Total points	SP		FS	
1st place, gold medalist(s)	Minerva Fabienne Hase / Nikita Volodin	Germany	202.51	1	67.23	1	135.28
2nd place, silver medalist(s)	Lucrezia Beccari / Matteo Guarise	Italy	190.31	2	66.77	2	123.54
3rd place, bronze medalist(s)	Rebecca Ghilardi / Filippo Ambrosini	Italy	186.47	4	62.98	3	123.49
4	Anastasia Golubeva / Hektor Giotopoulos Moore	Australia	185.39	3	64.61	4	120.78
5	Daria Danilova / Michel Tsiba	Netherlands	177.54	6	58.61	5	118.93
6	Chelsea Liu / Balazs Nagy	United States	172.60	5	61.23	7	111.37
7	Kelly Ann Laurin / Loucas Éthier	Canada	160.79	7	49.18	6	111.61
8	Yuna Nagaoka / Sumitada Moriguchi	Japan	135.39	8	45.36	8	90.03

=== Ice dance ===
Rank	Team	Nation	Total points	RD		FD	
1st place, gold medalist(s)	Lilah Fear / Lewis Gibson	Great Britain	215.19	2	84.93	1	130.26
2nd place, silver medalist(s)	Charlène Guignard / Marco Fabbri	Italy	214.56	1	85.27	2	129.29
3rd place, bronze medalist(s)	Allison Reed / Saulius Ambrulevičius	Lithuania	196.86	3	78.71	3	118.15
4	Juulia Turkkila / Matthias Versluis	Finland	191.01	4	74.66	4	116.35
5	Loïcia Demougeot / Théo le Mercier	France	187.76	5	73.58	5	114.18
6	Emily Bratti / Ian Somerville	United States	183.43	6	71.47	6	111.96
7	Marie-Jade Lauriault / Romain Le Gac	Canada	176.26	7	71.35	7	104.91
8	Lorraine McNamara / Anton Spiridonov	United States	167.84	8	65.65	9	102.19
9	Misato Komatsubara / Tim Koleto	Japan	167.61	9	64.12	8	103.49
