= Liam Kapeikis =

American figure skater (born 2004)

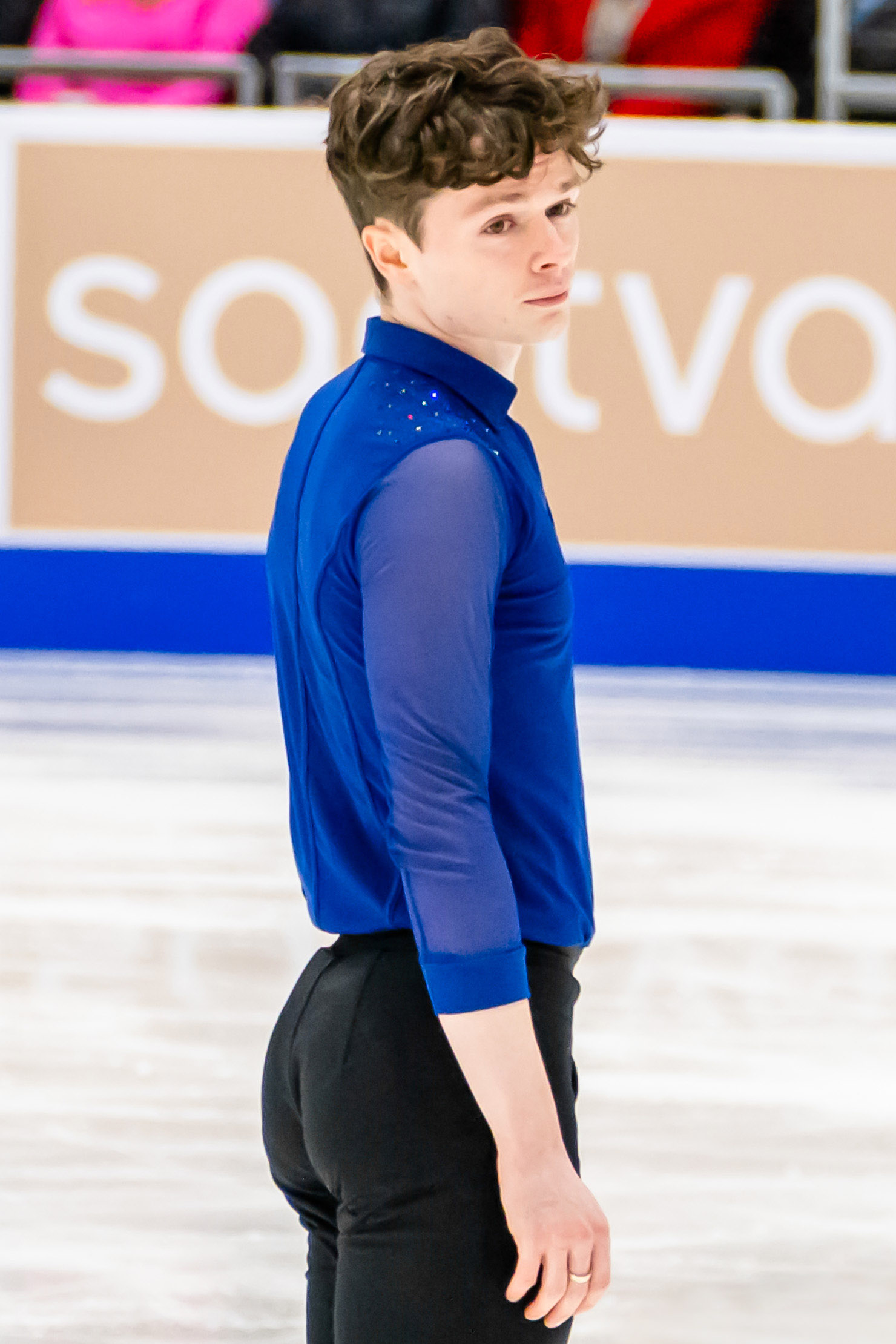
- Kapeikis at the 2025 Skate America

Personal information
- Born: June 28, 2004 (age 22) Wenatchee, Washington, U.S.
- Home town: Blaine, Washington, U.S.
- Height: 5 ft 10 in (1.77 m)

Figure skating career
- Country: United States
- Discipline: Men's singles
- Coach: Keegan Murphy
- Skating club: Wenatchee Figure Skating Club
- Began skating: 2010

Liam Kapeikis (born June 28, 2004) is an American figure skater. He is the 2022 CS Ice Challenge champion and 2020 U.S. national junior bronze medalist.

== Personal life ==
Liam Kapeikis was born on June 28, 2004, in Wenatchee, Washington to parents, Louise and Paul. Kapeikis has two sisters, Kaela and Danika. His parents and sister, Kaela, have skated with Disney on Ice.

Kapeikis holds citizenship for the United States, Canada, and Great Britain.

== Career ==
=== Early career ===
Kapeikis began figure skating at the age of seven. His parents coached him in Wenatchee, Washington until the age of fifteen when he relocated to Richmond, British Columbia to be coached by former Canadian figure skater Keegan Murphy.

=== 2019–20 season: Junior international debut ===
Competing on the 2019–20 ISU Junior Grand Prix, he placed eleventh at 2019 JGP Latvia. In January, he won the junior bronze medal at the 2020 U.S. Championships. Kapeikis was later assigned to compete at the 2020 Winter Youth Olympic Games in Lausanne, Switzerland, where he placed 10th.

=== 2020–21 season ===
Kapeikis finished ninth at the 2021 U.S. Junior Championships.

=== 2021–22 season: Senior international debut ===
Kapeikis started the season at the Skating Club of Boston's Cranberry Cup, where he finished fifth place at the junior level. In January 2022, he finished seventh at the U.S. national championships, placing eighth in the short program and sixth in the free skate. After attending the US junior camp, he was named to the US team for the 2022 World Junior Championships. At the 2022 World Junior Championships, Kapeikis placed fourth in the short program with a clean skate but placed twelfth in the free skate with several jump errors. As a result, he dropped to eighth place overall.

Making his senior international debut, he took the bronze medal at the Egna Spring Trophy in April.

=== 2022–23 season: Grand Prix and Four Continents debut ===
After winning gold at the Philadelphia Summer International, Kapeikis made his Challenger debut at the 2022 CS Nebelhorn Trophy, finishing eighth. Kapeikis then went on to make his senior Grand Prix debut at 2022 Skate America, where he placed seventh after finishing eighth in both the short program and free skate segments. He subsequently won the gold medal at the 2022 CS Ice Challenge.

At the 2023 U.S. Championships, Kapeikis placed fourth in the short program and tenth in the free skate, finishing the event in sixth place overall.

Selected to compete at the 2023 Four Continents Championships in Colorado Springs, Colorado, Kapeikis finished fourteenth after placing thirteenth in the short program and fourteenth in the free skate.

=== 2023–24 season ===
Kapeikis began the season with a sixth-place finish at the 2023 Cranberry Cup International and thirteenth at the 2023 CS Finlandia Trophy. He then went on to compete on the 2023–24 Grand Prix series, finishing eighth at the 2023 Skate Canada International and ninth at the 2023 Grand Prix of Espoo.

He closed the season with a thirteenth-place finish at the 2024 U.S. Championships.

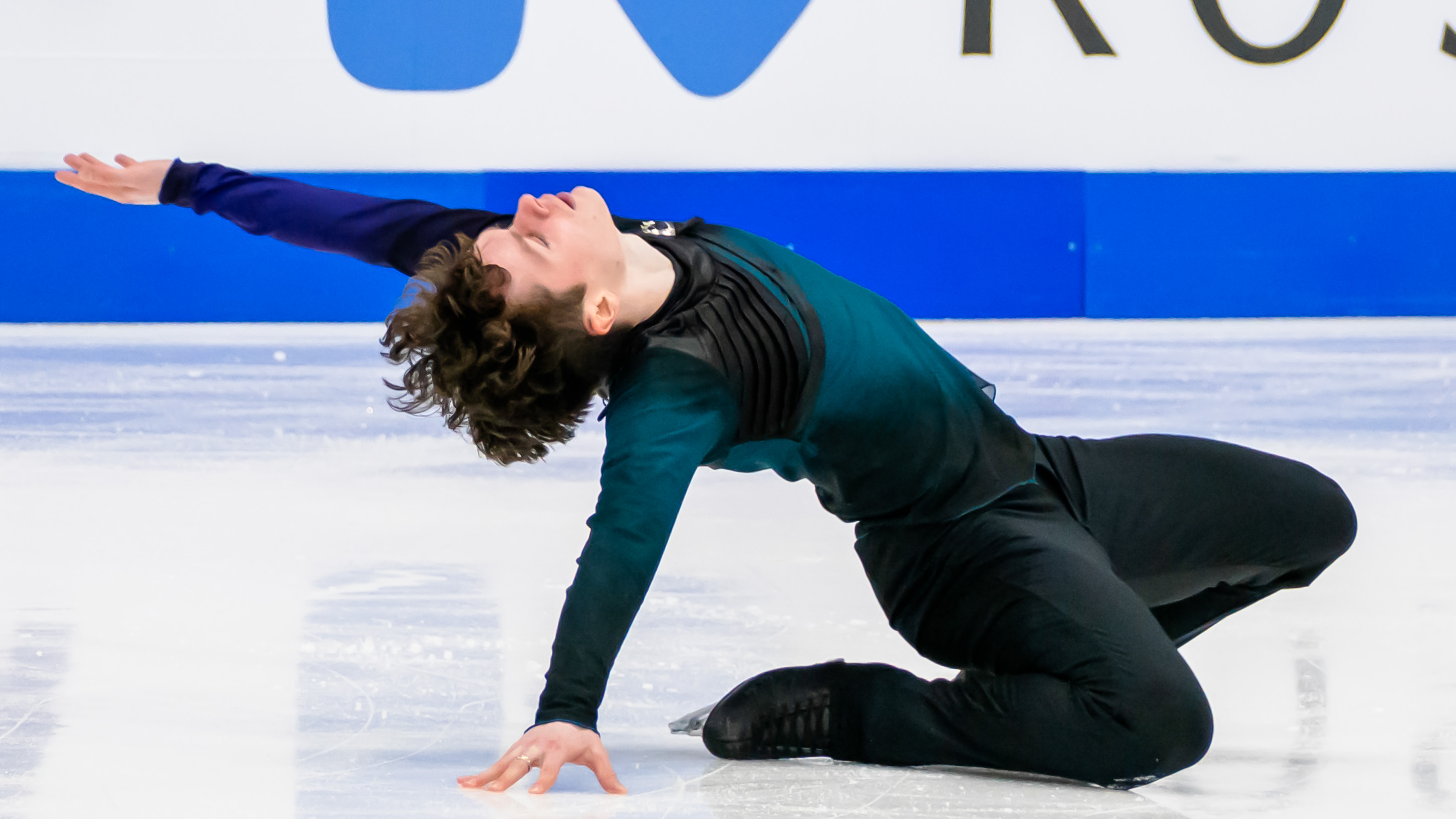
Kapeikis during his final free skate pose at 2025 Skate America

=== 2024–25 season ===
Kapeikis started the season by competing on the 2024-25 ISU Challenger Series, placing tenth at the 2024 CS Cranberry Cup International and seventh at the 2024 CS Trophée Métropole Nice Côte d'Azur.

Following an eighth-place finish at the 2025 U.S. Championships, he rounded off the season by finishing tenth at the Road to 26 Trophy.

=== 2025–26 season ===
Kapeikis began the season by competing on the 2025–26 Challenger Series, placing eighth at the 2025 CS Cranberry Cup International and sixth at the 2025 CS Nebelhorn Trophy. Selected as a host pick for 2025 Skate America, Kapeikis finished the event in ninth place. He then went on to finish eighth at the 2025 CS Tallinn Trophy.

In January, Kapeikis competed at the 2026 U.S. Championships, where he finished in sixth place. Following the withdrawal of Jason Brown, Kapeikis was assigned to compete at 2026 Four Continents Championships where he finished in 10th place.

=== 2026–27 season ===
Kapeikis opened the new season by placing 12th at the 2026 Kinoshita Group Cup.

== Programs ==
Season	Short program	Free skate	Exhibition	Ref.
2019–20	Never Enough (from The Greatest Showman) By Pasek and Paul Performed by Boyce Avenue	Les Misérables By Claude-Michel Schönberg	—N/a	
2020–21	Kyrie By Mr. Mister	Les Misérables By Claude-Michel Schönberg	—N/a	
2021–22	Man of La Mancha By Mitch Leigh Choreo. by Keegan Murphy & Joey Russell	Moulin Rouge! By Craig Armstrong Choreo. by Keegan Murphy &Joey Russell	—N/a	
2022–23	The Mask of Zorro By James Horner Choreo. by Keegan Murphy & Joey Russell	Moulin Rouge! By Craig Armstrong Choreo. by Keegan Murphy &Joey Russell	"Greased Lightnin'" (from Grease) By John Travolta; "Shout" By Tears for Fears Performed by Zayde Wølf	
2023–24	Jesus Christ Superstar; The Overture; Gethsemane By Andrew Lloyd Webber Choreo. by Joey Russell	"The Boxer" By Simon & Garfunkel Performed by Mumford & Sons; "Regained Faith" By Karl Hugo Choreo. by Joey Russell	"I Lived" By OneRepublic; Greased Lightnin'	
2024–25	"Movement" By Hozier Choreo. by Joey Russell	"The Boxer" By Simon & Garfunkel Performed by Mumford & Sons; "Regained Faith" By Karl Hugo Choreo. by Joey Russell		
2025–26	"Unchained Melody" (From Ghost) By Alex North & Hy Zaret Performed by The Righteous Brothers Choreo. by Joey Russell	Dragonheart By Randy Edelman Choreo. by Joey Russell		
2026–27	Are You Going to Be My Girl?; by Jet, Chris Cester & Cameron Muncey	Pompei MMXXIII; by Dan Smith, Hans Zimmer, Andrew Christie		

== Competitive highlights ==
- GP – Event of the ISU Grand Prix Series
- JGP – Event of the ISU Junior Grand Prix Series
- CS – Event of the ISU Challenger Series
- TBD – Assigned
- WD – Withdrew from competition

Competition placements at senior level
Season	2021–22	2022–23	2023-24	2024–25	2025–26	2026–27
Four Continents Championships		14th			10th	
U.S. Championships	7th	6th	13th	8th	6th	
GP Finland			9th			
GP Skate America		7th			9th	
GP Skate Canada International			8th			12th
CS Cranberry Cup			6th	10th	8th	
CS Finlandia Trophy			13th			
CS Ice Challenge		1st				
CS Kinoshita Group Cup						12th
CS Nebelhorn Trophy		8th			6th	5th
CS Tallinn Trophy					8th	
CS Trophée Métropole Nice				7th		
Egna Spring Trophy	3rd					
Philadelphia Summer		1st		2nd		
Road to 26 Trophy				10th		

Competition placements at junior level
Season	2019–20	2020–21	2021–22
Winter Youth Olympics	10th		
Winter Youth Olympics (Team event)	8th		
World Junior Championships			8th
U.S. Championships	3rd	9th	
JGP Latvia	11th		
Cranberry Cup			5th

== Detailed results ==
ISU personal best scores in the +5/-5 GOE System
Segment	Type	Score	Event
Total	TSS	227.45	2025 CS Nebelhorn Trophy
Short program	TSS	80.34	2026 CS Nebelhorn Trophy
Short program	TES	43.55	2022 World Junior Championships
Short program	PCS	37.49	2025 CS Nebelhorn Trophy
Free skating	TSS	153.54	2025 CS Nebelhorn Trophy
Free skating	TES	76.45	2025 CS Nebelhorn Trophy
Free skating	PCS	77.09	2025 CS Nebelhorn Trophy

=== Senior level ===
Results in the 2021–22 season
Date	Event	SP		FS		Total	
Date	Event	P	Score	P	Score	P	Score
Jan 3–9, 2022	(United States) 2022 U.S. Championships	8	73.77	6	147.54	7	221.31
Apr 7–10, 2022	(Italy) 2022 Egna Spring Trophy	3	71.52	2	148.29	3	219.81

Results in the 2022–23 season
Date	Event	SP		FS		Total	
Date	Event	P	Score	P	Score	P	Score
Aug 4–7, 2022	(United States) 2022 Philadelphia Summer Championships	1	72.91	1	136.65	1	209.56
Sep 21–24, 2022	(Germany) 2022 CS Nebelhorn Trophy	8	67.48	9	124.24	8	191.72
Oct 21–23, 2022	(United States) 2022 Skate America	8	74.29	8	145.21	7	219.50
Nov 9–13, 2022	(Austria) 2022 CS Ice Challenge	1	76.46	2	146.56	1	223.02
Jan 23–29, 2023	(United States) 2023 U.S. Championships	4	82.27	10	144.58	6	226.55
Feb 7–12, 2023	(United States) 2023 Four Continents Championships	13	71.43	14	126.57	14	198.00

Results in the 2023–24 season
Date	Event	SP		FS		Total	
Date	Event	P	Score	P	Score	P	Score
Aug 9–13, 2023	(United States) 2023 Cranberry Cup International	3	74.31	9	117.68	6	193.39
Oct 4–8, 2023	(Finland) 2023 CS Finlandia Trophy	14	67.27	13	113.76	13	181.03
Oct 27–29, 2023	2023 Skate Canada International	10	71.59	7	148.56	8	220.15
Nov 17–19, 2023	(Finland) 2023 Grand Prix of Espoo	9	69.10	10	127.84	9	196.94
Jan 22-28, 2024	(United States) 2024 U.S. Championships	10	72.44	15	120.05	9	192.69

Results in the 2024–25 season
Date	Event	SP		FS		Total	
Date	Event	P	Score	P	Score	P	Score
Jul 31 – Aug 4, 2024	(United States) 2024 Philadelphia Summer Championships	4	68.96	2	136.69	2	205.65
Aug 8–11, 2024	(United States) 2024 CS Cranberry Cup International	11	65.96	9	130.68	10	196.64
Oct 16–20, 2024	(France) 2024 CS Trophée Métropole Nice Côte d'Azur	10	68.15	7	140.78	7	208.93
Jan 20–26, 2025	(United States) 2025 U.S. Championships	5	84.01	14	129.69	8	213.70
Feb 19–20, 2025	(Italy) 2025 Road to 26 Trophy	10	63.44	8	124.09	10	187.53

Results in the 2025–26 season
Date	Event	SP		FS		Total	
Date	Event	P	Score	P	Score	P	Score
Aug 7–10, 2025	(United States) 2025 CS Cranberry Cup International	8	69.65	8	132.29	8	201.94
Sep 25–27, 2025	(Germany) 2025 CS Nebelhorn Trophy	6	73.91	3	153.54	6	227.45
Nov 14–16, 2025	(United States) 2025 Skate America	9	74.28	9	140.01	9	214.29
Nov 25–30, 2025	(Estonia) 2025 CS Tallinn Trophy	4	75.88	9	135.86	8	211.74
Jan 4–11, 2026	(United States) 2026 U.S. Championships	8	78.86	6	156.27	6	235.13
Jan 21–25, 2026	(China) 2026 Four Continents Championships	12	76.72	10	150.03	10	226.75

Results in the 2026–27 season
Date	Event	SP		FS		Total	
Date	Event	P	Score	P	Score	P	Score
Sep 4–6, 2026	(Japan) 2026 CS Kinoshita Group Cup	7	73.28	14	119.92	12	193.20
Sep 24–26, 2026	(Germany) 2026 CS Nebelhorn Trophy	3	80.34	6	140.70	5	221.04
Oct 30 – Nov 1, 2026	2026 Skate Canada International	10	70.07	12	118.94	12	189.01

=== Junior level ===
Results in the 2019–20 season
Date	Event	SP		FS		Total	
Date	Event	P	Score	P	Score	P	Score
Sep 4–7, 2019	2019 JGP Latvia	7	64.76	16	97.57	11	162.33
Jan 10–15, 2020	(Switzerland) 2020 Winter Youth Olympics	14	49.57	9	112.02	10	161.59
Jan 10–15, 2020	(Switzerland) 2020 Winter Youth Olympics (Team event)	—N/a	—N/a	4	117.28	8	—N/a
Jan 20–26, 2020	(United States) 2020 U.S. Championships (Junior)	2	68.12	4	121.03	3	189.15

Results in the 2020–21 season
Date	Event	SP		FS		Total	
Date	Event	P	Score	P	Score	P	Score
Jan 11–21, 2021	(United States) 2021 U.S. Championships (Junior)	10	58.37	9	104.52	9	162.89

Results in the 2021–22 season
Date	Event	SP		FS		Total	
Date	Event	P	Score	P	Score	P	Score
Aug 11–15, 2021	(United States) 2021 Cranberry Cup International	8	51.33	5	109.03	5	160.36
Apr 13–17, 2022	(United States) 2022 World Junior Championships	4	79.83	12	131.11	8	210.94
