= Michail Savitskiy =

German ice dancer (born 2003)

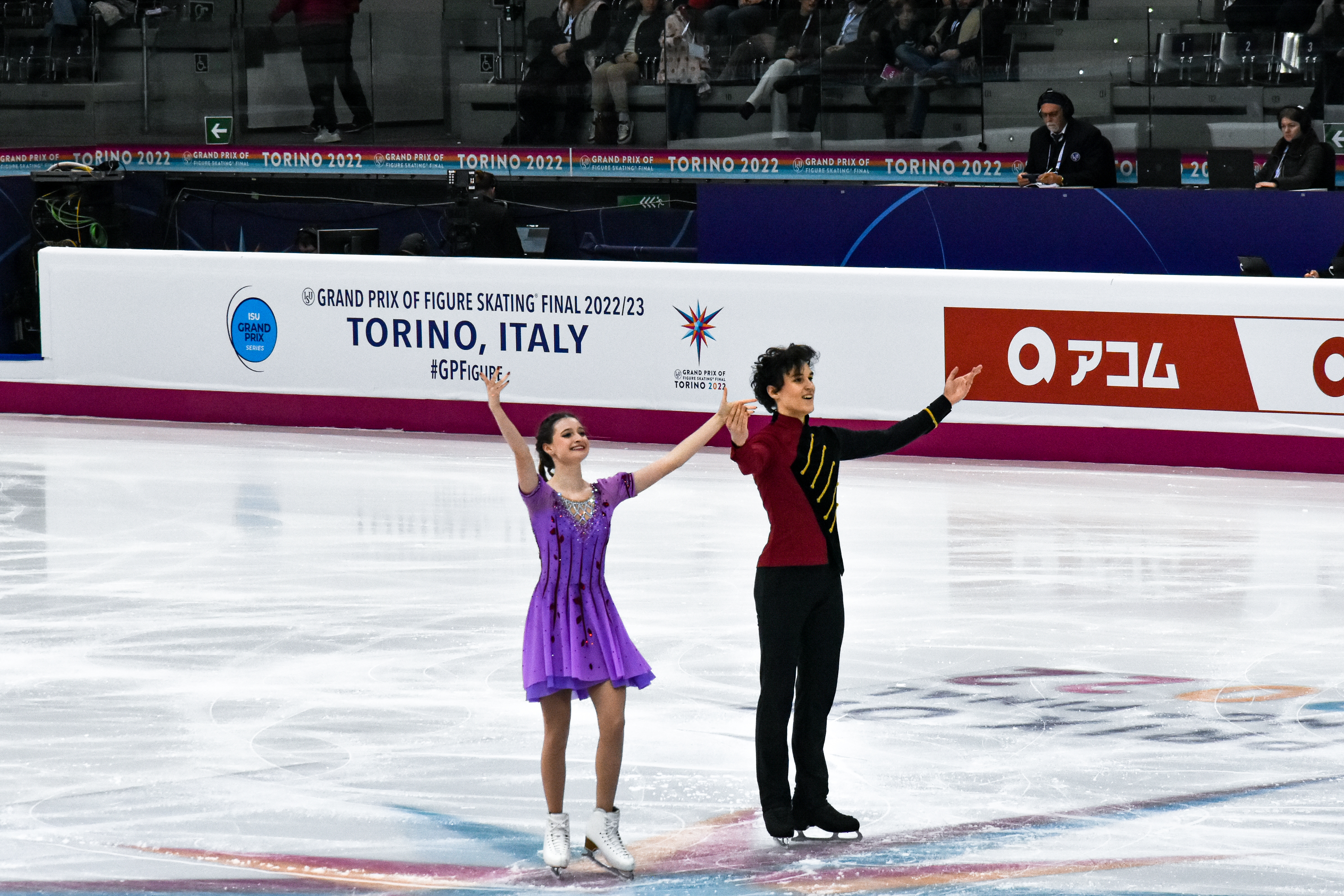
- Darya Grimm and Michail Savitskiy at the 2022–23 Junior Grand Prix Final

Personal information
- Born: 1 July 2003 (age 23) Offenbach am Main, Germany
- Home town: Oberstdorf, Germany
- Height: 1.83 m (6 ft 0 in)

Figure skating career
- Country: Germany
- Discipline: Ice dance
- Partner: Elizabeth Tkachenko(since 2026); Sara Kishimoto (2025-2026); Darya Grimm (2019–25)
- Coach: Matteo Zanni; Barbora Řezníčková; Katharina Müller; Maurizio Margaglio; Neil Brown
- Skating club: EC Oberstdorf

Medal record
World Junior Championships
Bronze medal – third place	2024 Taipei	Ice dance
Bronze medal – third place	2025 Debrecen	Ice dance
Junior Grand Prix Final
Bronze medal – third place	2023–24 Beijing	Ice dance
Bronze medal – third place	2024–25 Grenoble	Ice dance

Michail Savitskiy (born 1 July 2003) is a German ice dancer. With his former skating partner, Darya Grimm, he is a two-time World Junior bronze medalist (2024, 2025), a two-time Junior Grand Prix Final bronze medalist (2023–24, 2024–25), a four-time ISU Junior Grand Prix gold medalist, and a four-time German junior national champion (2022–25).

== Personal life ==
Savitskiy was born on 1 July 2003 in Offenbach am Main, Germany. Both of his parents were immigrants, his father from Belarus and his mother from Russia. He has an older brother named Daniil.

== Career ==
=== Partnership with Darya Grimm ===
==== Early career ====
Savitskiy began learning to skate at the age of five. With limited training opportunities for figure skaters in the Frankfurt-Rhein region, his brother Daniil moved to train in Oberstdorf, and he would eventually follow him there. He competed initially in men's singles figure skating. However, by the end of the 2018–19 season, Savitskiy found himself losing interest in the discipline, later saying "jump-wise I was doing okay, but lost the interest in single skating. I basically wanted to retire, but then I had the opportunity to switch to ice dance and I thought, 'why shouldn't I try it?'"

In September 2019, Savitskiy formed an ice dance partnership with Darya Grimm. They began training in Oberstdorf, coached by former Soviet ice dancers Rostislav Sinicyn and Natalia Karamysheva.

==== 2021–22 season ====
With the onset of COVID-19 pandemic having cancelled international junior competitions in the 2020–21 season, Grimm/Savitskiy had the opportunity to make their ISU Junior Grand Prix debut in the fall of 2021. Given two assignments, they placed sixth at both the 2021 JGP France in Courchevel and the 2021 JGP Austria in Linz. They went on to place fourth at both the Ice Challenge and the Egna Dance Trophy, and won the German junior national title.

Their national title earned Grimm/Savitskiy the German berth at the 2022 World Junior Championships. The championships could not be held as scheduled in Sofia in early March, and as a result were rescheduled for Tallinn in mid-April. The championships were further upended when Vladimir Putin ordered a Russian invasion of Ukraine. As a result of the invasion, the International Skating Union banned all Russian and Belarusian athletes from participating in competitions, which had a significant impact on the junior dance field. In the leadup, Grimm briefly tested positive for COVID, but only lost a few training days. Competing in Tallinn, Grimm/Savitskiy placed an unexpected fourth in the rhythm dance. Seventh in the free dance, they were fifth overall. Reflecting on their result, Savitskiy noted "I don't think many people expected that and it was a surprise for us as well, but of course we are very happy."

==== 2022–23 season ====
Beginning the Junior Grand Prix at the 2022 JGP Latvia in Riga, Grimm/Savitskiy were the pre-event favourites in light of their Junior World result, but were narrowly second in the rhythm dance. They decisively overtook Canadians Gauthier/Thieren in the free dance, taking the gold medal. This was their first international win, and the first Junior Grand Prix gold for a German dance team since 2002. At their second event in Gdańsk, they took the silver medal behind reigning World bronze medalists Bashynska/Beaumont, despite Grimm falling in the free dance. Their results qualified them for the Junior Grand Prix Final. They finished fifth in both segments and overall at the Final.

After winning their second German junior title, Grimm/Savitskiy won the gold medal at the Bavarian Open's junior event. Both dealt with illness in the leadup to the 2023 World Junior Championships in Calgary. They finished narrowly sixth in the rhythm dance with a new personal best score of 65.67, 0.14 behind the fifth-place French team Fradji/Fourneaux. However, they had to withdraw before the free dance, citing Grimm having come down with suspected food poisoning. She said that they were "really upset, but we don't want to risk our health," and so "with an amazing rhythm dance and a sixth-place, we are finishing our season."

==== 2023–24 season ====
Grimm and Savitskiy encountered difficulties in the leadup to the beginning of the Junior Grand Prix, with him falling ill shortly before the 2023 JGP Austria. Despite this, they won both segments of the competition and took the gold medal. They competed next at the 2023 JGP Poland, facing off against the Ukrainian team Pinchuk/Pogorielov, who had also won a gold medal at their prior event. Shortly prior to departing for the event in Gdańsk, Savitskiy cut his hand in practice, impeding their performance ability. Both they and the Ukrainians struggled in the free dance, with Grimm/Savitskiy coming third in that segment, but their first-place in the rhythm dance secured them another gold medal and a second consecutive Junior Grand Prix Final. Grimm said they were "relieved" by the result.

At the Junior Grand Prix Final in Beijing, Grimm/Savitskiy finished third in both segments and won the bronze medal. They were the third German competitors to medal at the Final on the junior level, after fellow dance team Steinel/Tsvetkov and men's singles skater Stefan Lindemann, and this was the first medal win in 22 years. Savitskiy said the result was an "honour."

After winning a third consecutive German junior title, Grimm/Savitskiy traveled to Taipei to compete at the 2024 World Junior Championships. They were second in the rhythm dance, 0.23 points ahead of Israelis Tkachenko/Kiliakov, and won a silver small medal for the segment. In the free dance, both lost levels on their twizzles, and as a result they were third in that segment, 0.78 points behind Tkachenko/Kiliakov, who overtook them for the overall silver medal. Despite this, both said it was "great" to win a bronze medal at the championship. Savitskiy suggested that while they would compete junior in the next season, they might consider trying senior events as well, adding "we aren't entirely sure yet."

==== 2024–25 season ====
In late August, it was announced that due to disagreements Grimm/Savitskiy had left coaches Rostislav Sinicyn and Natalia Karamysheva to train under Martin Skotnický. In their first competition of the season, they won the bronze medal at the 2024 JGP Latvia. While preparing for their second Junior Grand Prix event, Grimm/Savitskiy moved from Oberstdorf to Egna, Italy, where Matteo Zanni, Barbora Řezníčková and Katharina Müller became their new coaches. Savitskiy would later acknowledge their coaching changes to be a "mentally stressful situation." The duo had time to adjust to their new training location and were able to better prepare for the 2024 JGP Turkey in Ankara, where they won the gold medal. Grimm/Savitskiy's JGP results allowed them to qualify for the JGP Final for the third consecutive year. They then made their senior level debut at the 2024 CS Nepela Memorial, where they finished ninth.

In early November, it was reported that Maurizio Margaglio and Neil Brown had joined Grimm/Savitskiy's coaching staff, and that the team would make frequent trips to Helsinki, Finland to work with the coaching duo. Grimm and Savitskiy opted to change their rhythm dance for the Final. She explained that their first program "didn't score so well and the feedback from the judges was like, 'It's OK but it’s not groundbreaking'. So we decided to change it." They placed third in the segment at the Final. Third in the free dance as well, Grimm/Savitskiy won their second consecutive Final bronze medal. T Two weeks later they won their fourth consecutive national title at the 2025 German Junior Championships.

Savitskiy was plagued with back problems in the leadup to the 2025 World Junior Championships in Debrecen, and until the week prior the team was uncertain whether they would be able to attend. Grimm/Savitskiy placed third in the rhythm dance, 0.29 points behind Americans Wolfkostin/Tsarevski in second place. Third in the free dance as well, albeit further back from second, the team won their second World Junior bronze medal. Savitskiy said afterward that the "best way to describe how we feel is relief. We're definitely super happy with how the season ended, with how we delivered the final product, especially considering our not-so-good preparation."

In May 2025, Grimm/Savitskiy announced the end of their partnership.

=== Partnership with Sara Kishimoto ===
In September 2025, it was announced that Savitskiy had teamed up with Japanese ice dancer, Sara Kishimoto, and that the team planned to represent Germany whilst training full-time in Canada. Due to Kishimoto's decision to switch countries, the team are required to sit out of international competition for a whole year.

=== Partnership with Elizabeth Tkachenko ===
In October 2026, it was announced that Savitskiy had teamed up with Elizabeth Tkachenko, who had formerly represented Israel.

== Programs ==
=== With Grimm ===
Season	Rhythm dance	Free dance	Exhibition
2024–2025	Miss Broadway by Belle Epoque; Black Betty performed by Caravan Palace choreo. by Mariia Tumanovska-Chaika, Natalia Karamysheva	Adagio performed by Dimash Qudaibergen choreo. by Mariia Tumanovska-Chaika, Natalia Karamysheva	Toy Story; Woody's Roundup by Riders in the Sky; You've Got a Friend in Me by Randy Newman; When She Loved Me by Sarah McLachlan; Sway by Luis Demetrio & Pablo Beltrán Ruiz
2023–2024	No Way Out; Ticket to the Moon; So Serious by Electric Light Orchestra choreo. by Mariia Tumanovska-Chaika, Natalia Karamysheva	Introduction and Rondo Capriccioso by Camille Saint-Saëns; Habanera (from Carmen) by Georges Bizet performed by Soprano choreo. by Mariia Tumanovska-Chaika, Natalia Karamysheva	The Nutcracker Suite, Op. 71a: 1st Movement arr. for drums by Mike Terrana; The Nutcracker Suite by Pyotr Ilyich Tchaikovsky arr. for cello and orchestra by Stjepan Hauser performed by the London Symphony Orchestra choreo. by Mariia Tumanovska-Chaika, Natalia Karamysheva
2022–2023	Milonga Sentimental by Delfina Cheb; Tango: Finale (Tango Apasionado) by 1721 Project; Tango Codigo de barra by Bajofondo choreo. by Mariia Tumanovska-Chaika, Natalia Karamysheva	The Nutcracker Suite, Op. 71a: 1st Movement arr. for drums by Mike Terrana; The Nutcracker Suite by Pyotr Ilyich Tchaikovsky arr. for cello and orchestra by Stjepan Hauser performed by the London Symphony Orchestra choreo. by Mariia Tumanovska-Chaika, Natalia Karamysheva	
2021–2022	Blues: Goin' Crazy With the Blues; Swing: Bei Mir Bistu Shein performed by The Hot Sardines choreo. by Mariia Tumanovska-Chaika	Sarabande by Escala; Sarabande Suite (Aeternae) by Globus choreo. by Mariia Tumanovska-Chaika	

== Competitive highlights ==
=== Ice dance with Darya Grimm ===
- CS – Event of the ISU Challenger Series
- JGP – Event of the ISU Junior Grand Prix Series
- TBD – Assigned
- WD – Withdrew from competition

Competition placements at senior level
Season	2024–25
CS Nepela Memorial	9th

Competition placements at junior level
Season	2021–22	2022–23	2023–24	2024–25
World Junior Championships	5th	WD	3rd	3rd
Junior Grand Prix Final		5th	3rd	3rd
German Championships	1st	1st	1st	1st
JGP Austria	6th		1st	
JGP France	6th			
JGP Latvia		1st		3rd
JGP Poland		2nd	1st	
JGP Turkey				1st
Bavarian Open		1st	1st	
Denis Ten Memorial			1st	
Egna Dance Trophy	4th			
Ice Challenge	4th			
NRW Trophy		3rd		

== Detailed results ==
=== Ice dance with Darya Grimm ===
ISU personal best scores in the +5/-5 GOE System
Segment	Type	Score	Event
Total	TSS	162.49	2024 CS Nepela Memorial
Short program	TSS	66.49	2023–24 Grand Prix Final
Short program	TES	36.99	2023–24 Grand Prix Final
Short program	PCS	29.50	2023–24 Grand Prix Final
Free skating	TSS	101.12	2024 CS Nepela Memorial
Free skating	TES	57.72	2024 CS Nepela Memorial
Free skating	PCS	45.86	2024 World Junior Championships

==== Senior results ====
Results in the 2024–25 season
Date	Event	RD		FD		Total	
Date	Event	P	Score	P	Score	P	Score
Oct 24-26, 2024	(Czech Republic) 2024 CS Nepela Memorial	11	61.37	8	101.12	9	162.49

==== Junior results ====
Results in the 2024–25 season
Date	Event	RD		FD		Total	
Date	Event	P	Score	P	Score	P	Score
Aug 28–31, 2024	2024 JGP Latvia	2	61.97	3	94.36	3	156.33
Sep 18–21, 2024	2024 JGP Turkey	3	60.89	1	97.31	1	158.20
Dec 5–8, 2024	(France) 2024–25 Junior Grand Prix Final	3	64.84	3	97.02	3	161.86
Dec 16–21, 2024	(Germany) 2025 German Championships	1	69.85	1	90.68	1	160.53
Feb 25 – Mar 2, 2025	(Hungary) 2025 World Junior Championships	3	65.42	3	98.84	3	164.26
