= 2023–24 Grand Prix of Figure Skating Final =

Figure skating competition

2023–24 Grand Prix Final
- Type: Grand Prix
- Date: December 7 – 10
- Season: 2023–24
- Location: Beijing, China
- Host: Chinese Skating Association
- Venue: National Indoor Stadium

Champions
- Men's singles: (United States) Ilia Malinin (S) (Japan) Rio Nakata (J)
- Women's singles: (Japan) Kaori Sakamoto (S) (Japan) Mao Shimada (J)
- Pairs: (Germany) Minerva Fabienne Hase / Nikita Volodin (S) (Georgia (country)) Anastasia Metelkina / Luka Berulava (J)
- Ice dance: (United States) Madison Chock / Evan Bates (S) (United States) Leah Neset / Artem Markelov (J)
- Previous: 2022–23 Grand Prix Final
- Next: 2024–25 Grand Prix Final
- Previous Grand Prix: 2023 NHK Trophy
- Next Grand Prix: 2024 Skate America

The 2023–24 Grand Prix of Figure Skating Final and ISU Junior Grand Prix Final were held from December 7–10, 2023, at the National Indoor Stadium in Beijing, China. The combined event was the culmination of two international series: the Grand Prix of Figure Skating and the Junior Grand Prix. Medals were awarded in men's singles, women's singles, pair skating, and ice dance at both the senior and junior levels.

== Qualifiers ==
=== Senior qualifiers ===
No.	Men	Women	Pairs	Ice dance
1	(France); Adam Siao Him Fa	(Japan); Kaori Sakamoto	(Canada); Deanna Stellato-Dudek; Maxime Deschamps	(Canada); Piper Gilles; Paul Poirier
2	(United States); Ilia Malinin	(United States); Isabeau Levito	(Germany); Minerva Fabienne Hase; Nikita Volodin	(United States); Madison Chock; Evan Bates
3	(Japan); Kao Miura	(Belgium); Loena Hendrickx	(Canada); Lia Pereira; Trennt Michaud	(Italy); Charlène Guignard; Marco Fabbri
4	(Japan); Yuma Kagiyama	(Japan); Hana Yoshida	(Italy); Sara Conti; Niccolò Macii	(United Kingdom); Lilah Fear; Lewis Gibson
5	(Japan); Shoma Uno	(Belgium); Nina Pinzarrone	(Germany); Annika Hocke; Robert Kunkel; (withdrew)	(Canada); Laurence Fournier Beaudry; Nikolaj Sørensen
6	(France); Kévin Aymoz	(Japan); Rion Sumiyoshi	(Italy); Rebecca Ghilardi; Filippo Ambrosini	(Canada); Marjorie Lajoie; Zachary Lagha

Alternates

No.	Men	Women	Pairs	Ice dance
1	(Japan); Shun Sato	(South Korea); Kim Chae-yeon	(Hungary); Maria Pavlova; Alexei Sviatchenko; (called up)	(Lithuania); Allison Reed; Saulius Ambrulevičius
2	(Japan); Sōta Yamamoto	(United States); Lindsay Thorngren	(Italy); Lucrezia Beccari; Matteo Guarise	(France); Evgeniia Lopareva; Geoffrey Brissaud
3	(Switzerland); Lukas Britschgi	(Estonia); Niina Petrõkina	(China); Peng Cheng; Wang Lei	(Finland); Juulia Turkkila; Matthias Versluis

=== Junior qualifiers ===
No.	Men	Women	Pairs	Ice dance
1	(Japan); Rio Nakata	(Japan); Mao Shimada	(Georgia (country)); Anastasia Metelkina; Luka Berulava	(United States); Leah Neset; Artem Markelov
2	(South Korea); Lim Ju-heon	(South Korea); Shin Ji-a	(Canada); Martina Ariano Kent; Charly Laliberté-Laurent	(Germany); Darya Grimm; Michail Savitskiy
3	(France); François Pitot	(Japan); Ami Nakai	(Ukraine); Violetta Sierova; Ivan Khobta	(Israel); Elizabeth Tkachenko; Alexei Kiliakov
4	(South Korea); Kim Hyun-gyeom	(Japan); Rena Uezono	(United States); Olivia Flores; Luke Wang	(Ukraine); Mariia Pinchuk; Mykyta Pogorielov
5	(United States); Daniel Martynov	(South Korea); Kim Yu-seong	(Canada); Ava Kemp; Yohnatan Elizarov	(United States); Yahli Pedersen; Jeffrey Chen
6	(Slovakia); Adam Hagara	(South Korea); Kwon Min-sol	(Canada); Jazmine Desrochers; Kieran Thrasher	(France); Célina Fradji; Jean-Hans Fourneaux

Alternates

No.	Men	Women	Pairs	Ice dance
1	(United States); Beck Strommer	(Japan); Yo Takagi	(France); Louise Ehrhard; Mathis Pellegris	(United States); Elliana Peal; Ethan Peal
2	(South Korea); Seo Min-kyu	(United States); Elyce Lin-Gracey	(China); Shi Wenning; Wang Zhiyu	(Ukraine); Iryna Pidgaina; Artem Koval
3	(Japan); Daiya Ebihara	(South Korea); Youn Seo-jin	(China); Yang Yixi; Deng Shunyang	(Japan); Sara Kishimoto; Atsuhiko Tamura

=== Changes to preliminary assignments ===
Discipline	Withdrew		Added		Notes	Ref.
Discipline	Date	Skater(s)	Date	Skater(s)	Notes	Ref.
Senior pairs	November 30	(Germany) Annika Hocke / Robert Kunkel	November 30	(Hungary) Maria Pavlova / Alexei Sviatchenko	Injury (Kunkel)	

== Medal summary ==
=== Senior medalists ===
Discipline	Gold	Silver	Bronze
Men	(United States) Ilia Malinin	(Japan) Shoma Uno	(Japan) Yuma Kagiyama
Women	(Japan) Kaori Sakamoto	(Belgium) Loena Hendrickx	(Japan) Hana Yoshida
Pairs	(Germany) Minerva Fabienne Hase / Nikita Volodin	(Italy) Sara Conti / Niccolò Macii	(Canada) Deanna Stellato-Dudek / Maxime Deschamps
Ice dance	(United States) Madison Chock / Evan Bates	(Italy) Charlene Guignard / Marco Fabbri	(Canada) Piper Gilles / Paul Poirier

=== Junior medalists ===
Discipline	Gold	Silver	Bronze
Men	(Japan) Rio Nakata	(South Korea) Kim Hyun-gyeom	(Slovakia) Adam Hagara
Women	(Japan) Mao Shimada	(South Korea) Shin Ji-a	(Japan) Rena Uezono
Pairs	(Georgia (country)) Anastasiia Metelkina / Luka Berulava	(Canada) Ava Kemp / Yohnatan Elizarov	(Canada) Jazmine Desrochers / Kieran Thrasher
Ice dance	(United States) Leah Neset / Artem Markelov	(Israel) Elizabeth Tkachenko / Alexei Kiliakov	(Germany) Darya Grimm / Michail Savitskiy

=== Medals table ===
==== Senior ====
Rank	Nation	Gold	Silver	Bronze	Total
1	United States	2	0	0	2
2	Japan	1	1	2	4
3	Germany	1	0	0	1
4	Italy	0	2	0	2
5	Belgium	0	1	0	1
6	Canada	0	0	2	2
Totals (6 entries)		4	4	4	12

==== Junior ====
Rank	Nation	Gold	Silver	Bronze	Total
1	Japan	2	0	1	3
2	Georgia	1	0	0	1
2	United States	1	0	0	1
4	South Korea	0	2	0	2
5	Canada	0	1	1	2
6	Israel	0	1	0	1
7	Germany	0	0	1	1
7	Slovakia	0	0	1	1
Totals (8 entries)		4	4	4	12

== Senior-level results ==
=== Men's singles ===
American skater Ilia Malinin successfully performed a quadruple Axel during his short program; this was the first time that any skater had performed this jump during a short program. Malinin had successfully performed quadruple Axels in previous competitions, but only during the free skating segment.

During the free skate, Malinin successfully performed a quadruple loop, thus becoming the first skater to ever perform all six jumps as quadruples in competition.

Rank	Skater	Nation	Total points	SP		FS	
1st place, gold medalist(s)	Ilia Malinin	United States	314.66	1	106.90	1	207.76
2nd place, silver medalist(s)	Shoma Uno	Japan	297.34	2	106.02	2	191.32
3rd place, bronze medalist(s)	Yuma Kagiyama	Japan	288.65	3	103.72	4	184.93
4	Adam Siao Him Fa	France	278.28	6	88.36	3	190.02
5	Kao Miura	Japan	261.53	4	94.86	5	166.67
6	Kévin Aymoz	France	219.91	5	93.20	6	126.71

=== Women's singles ===
Rank	Skater	Nation	Total points	SP		FS	
1st place, gold medalist(s)	Kaori Sakamoto	Japan	225.70	1	77.35	1	148.35
2nd place, silver medalist(s)	Loena Hendrickx	Belgium	203.36	2	73.25	4	130.11
3rd place, bronze medalist(s)	Hana Yoshida	Japan	203.16	4	60.65	2	142.51
4	Nina Pinzarrone	Belgium	194.91	3	66.72	5	128.19
5	Isabeau Levito	United States	191.86	6	56.53	3	135.33
6	Rion Sumiyoshi	Japan	180.39	5	58.63	6	121.76

=== Pairs ===
Rank	Team	Nation	Total points	SP		FS	
1st place, gold medalist(s)	Minerva Fabienne Hase / Nikita Volodin	Germany	206.43	1	72.56	2	133.87
2nd place, silver medalist(s)	Sara Conti / Niccolò Macii	Italy	205.88	3	70.30	1	135.58
3rd place, bronze medalist(s)	Deanna Stellato-Dudek / Maxime Deschamps	Canada	204.30	2	71.22	3	133.08
4	Maria Pavlova / Alexei Sviatchenko	Hungary	192.01	4	65.51	5	126.51
5	Rebecca Ghilardi / Filippo Ambrosini	Italy	188.85	5	61.91	4	126.94
6	Lia Pereira / Trennt Michaud	Canada	185.16	6	61.78	6	123.38

=== Ice dance ===
Rank	Team	Nation	Total points	RD		FD	
1st place, gold medalist(s)	Madison Chock / Evan Bates	United States	221.61	1	89.15	1	132.46
2nd place, silver medalist(s)	Charlène Guignard / Marco Fabbri	Italy	215.51	2	85.82	2	129.69
3rd place, bronze medalist(s)	Piper Gilles / Paul Poirier	Canada	213.58	3	85.17	3	128.41
4	Lilah Fear / Lewis Gibson	Great Britain	202.27	4	76.24	4	126.03
5	Laurence Fournier Beaudry / Nikolaj Sørensen	Canada	195.57	5	74.82	5	120.75
6	Marjorie Lajoie / Zachary Lagha	Canada	193.63	6	74.74	6	118.89

== Junior-level results ==
=== Men's singles ===
Rank	Skater	Nation	Total points	SP		FS	
1st place, gold medalist(s)	Rio Nakata	Japan	227.77	4	67.71	1	160.06
2nd place, silver medalist(s)	Kim Hyun-gyeom	South Korea	223.61	1	77.01	2	146.60
3rd place, bronze medalist(s)	Adam Hagara	Slovakia	213.26	3	71.43	3	141.83
4	Lim Ju-heon	South Korea	209.99	2	73.72	4	136.27
5	François Pitot	France	197.31	6	64.87	5	132.44
6	Daniel Martynov	United States	183.47	5	66.23	6	117.24

=== Women's singles ===
Rank	Skater	Nation	Total points	SP		FS	
1st place, gold medalist(s)	Mao Shimada	Japan	206.33	2	68.27	1	138.06
2nd place, silver medalist(s)	Shin Ji-a	South Korea	200.75	1	69.08	2	131.67
3rd place, bronze medalist(s)	Rena Uezono	Japan	196.46	3	67.87	3	128.59
4	Kim Yu-seong	South Korea	190.48	5	62.71	4	127.77
5	Ami Nakai	Japan	187.04	4	65.04	5	122.00
6	Kwon Min-sol	South Korea	183.06	6	62.12	6	120.94

=== Pairs ===
Rank	Team	Nation	Total points	SP		FS	
1st place, gold medalist(s)	Anastasiia Metelkina / Luka Berulava	Georgia	202.11	1	70.48	1	131.63
2nd place, silver medalist(s)	Ava Kemp / Yohnatan Elizarov	Canada	168.83	2	57.91	2	110.92
3rd place, bronze medalist(s)	Jazmine Desrochers / Kieran Thrasher	Canada	156.33	4	54.91	3	101.42
4	Martina Ariano Kent / Charly Laliberté-Laurent	Canada	150.70	3	55.97	4	94.73
5	Olivia Flores / Luke Wang	United States	145.39	5	54.37	6	91.02
6	Violetta Sierova / Ivan Khobta	Ukraine	140.17	6	47.52	5	92.65

=== Ice dance ===
Rank	Team	Nation	Total points	RD		FD	
1st place, gold medalist(s)	Leah Neset / Artem Markelov	United States	177.09	1	72.48	1	104.61
2nd place, silver medalist(s)	Elizabeth Tkachenko / Alexei Kiliakov	Israel	168.78	2	68.14	2	100.64
3rd place, bronze medalist(s)	Darya Grimm / Michail Savitskiy	Germany	159.41	3	66.49	3	92.92
4	Célina Fradji / Jean-Hans Fourneaux	France	153.42	4	61.60	4	91.82
5	Mariia Pinchuk / Mykyta Pogorielov	Ukraine	147.23	5	60.20	6	87.03
6	Yahli Pedersen / Jeffrey Chen	United States	144.57	6	54.30	5	90.27
