= Rostislav Sinicyn =

Soviet-Czech ice dancer

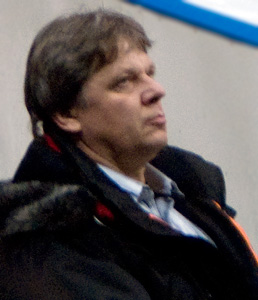
- Rostislav Sinicyn at the 2010 Cup of Russia

Personal information
- Other names: Rostislav Alexandrovich Sinitsyn
- Born: 18 October 1955 (age 70) Nizhny Tagil, Russian SFSR, Soviet Union

Figure skating career
- Country: Soviet Union

Rostislav Alexandrovich Sinicyn (Russian: Ростислав Александрович Синицын, also romanized as Rostislav Sinitsyn) (born 18 October 1955) is an ice dancer who competed for the Soviet Union. With his wife Natalia Karamyševa (Karamysheva), Sinicyn is the 1978 and 1980 Soviet national champion. Following his retirement from competitive skating, he has wrked as a coach and choreographer. He was naturalized as a Czech citizen.

== Career ==
Rostislav Sinitsyn and Natalia Karamysheva placed 5th at the 1979 European Championships and 7th at the 1980 World Championships. They won the silver medal at the 1981 Winter Universiade.

Following his retirement from competitive skating, he became a coach and choreographer. His current and former students and clients include:

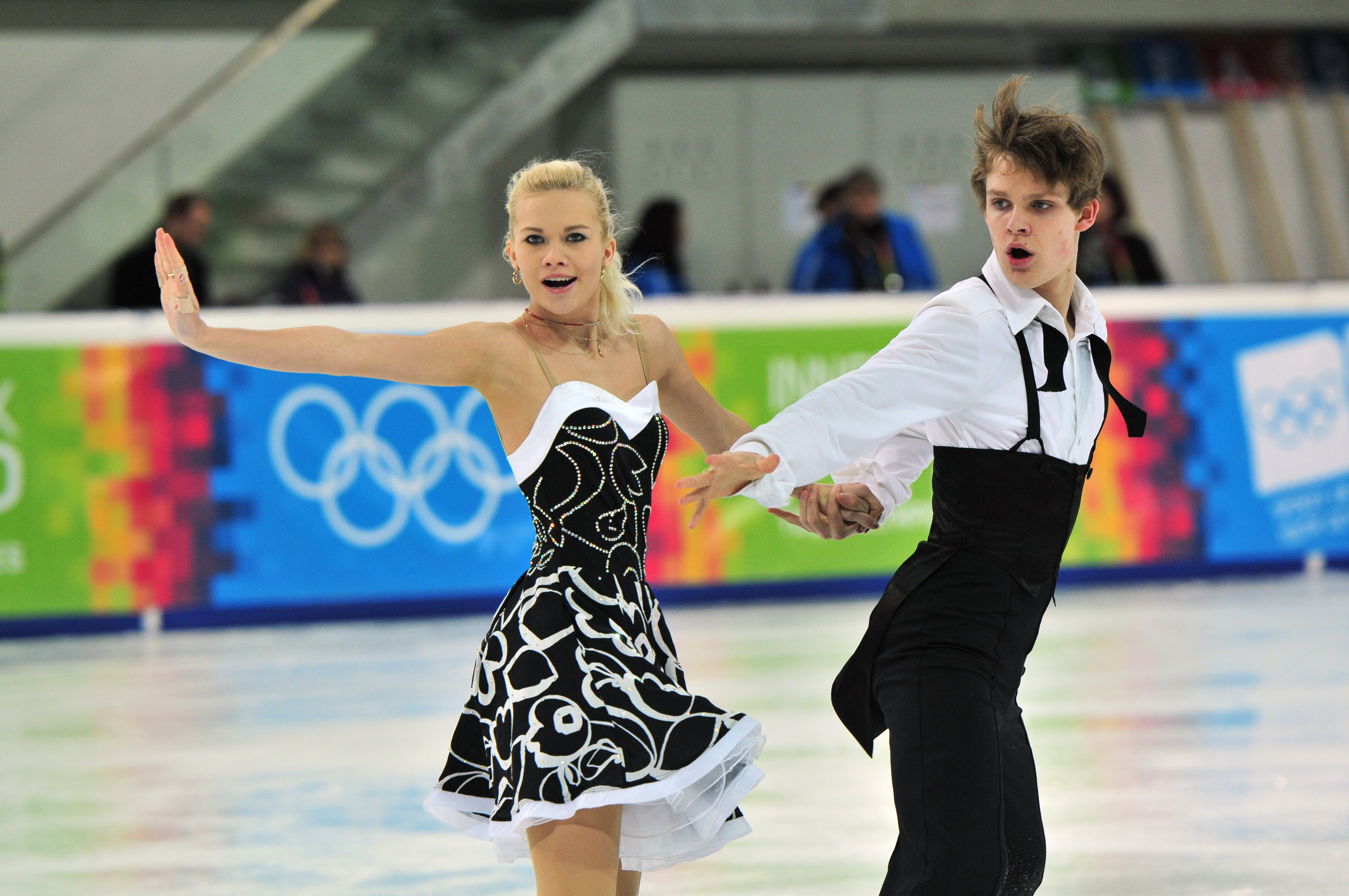
Jana Čejková / Alexandr Sinicyn

Ice dancing

- (Germany) Saskia Brall / Tim Giesen
- (Czech Republic) Jana Čejková / Alexandr Sinicyn
- (Lithuania) Margarita Drobiazko / Povilas Vanagas
- (Germany) Darya Grimm / Michail Savitskiy
- (Czech Republic) Kamila Hájková / David Vincour
- (Germany) Carolina Hermann / Daniel Hermann
- (Germany) Jennifer Janse van Rensburg / Benjamin Steffan
- (Czech Republic) Barbora Heroldova / Zdenek Pazdera
- (Czech Republic) Lucie Myslivečková / Matěj Novák
- (Czech Republic) Karolína Procházková / Michal Češka
- (Lithuania) Allison Reed / Saulius Ambrulevičius
- (Sweden) Milla Ruud Reitan / Nikolaj Majorov
- (Germany) Lilia Schubert / Nikita Remeshevskiy
- (Germany) Nelli Zhiganshina / Alexander Gazsi

Single & pair skating

- (Slovakia) Radka Bártová
- (Switzerland) Lukas Britschgi
- (Slovenia) Nika Ceric
- (Turkey) Burak Demirboğa
- (Germany) Annette Dytrt
- (Germany) Alisa Efimova / Ruben Blommaert
- (Italy) Sara Falotico
- (Germany) Minerva Fabienne Hase / Nolan Seegert
- (Czech Republic) Ivana Hudziecová
- (Estonia) Olga Ikonnikova
- (Germany) Kristina Isaev
- (Germany) Kai Jagoda
- (Czech Republic) Pavel Kaška
- (Austria) Denise Koegl
- (Ukraine) Yehor Kurtsev
- (Uzbekistan) Tatiana Malinina
- (Austria) Olga Mikutina
- (Slovenia) Damjan Ostojič
- (Slovenia) Teodora Poštič
- (Germany) Annabelle Prölß / Ruben Blommaert
- (Italy) Ivan Righini
- (Germany) Nicole Schott
- (Estonia) Aleksandr Selevko
- (Estonia) Mihhail Selevko
- (Germany) Silvio Smalun
- (Czech Republic) Tomáš Verner
- (Finland) Valtter Virtanen
- (Germany) Kristin Wieczorek

== Personal life ==
Sinicyn is a naturalized Czech citizen. He is married to Natalia Karamyševa. Their son, Alexandr Sinicyn (born 27 March 1996 in Prague), is a competitive ice dancer for the Czech Republic.

"Sinicyn" and "Sinitsyn" have both been used to romanize his surname. "Sinicyn" is the Czech-style version.

== Results ==
(with Karamysheva)

International
Event	77–78	78–79	79–80	80–81	81–82	82–83
World Champ.			7th			
European Champ.		5th				
NHK Trophy			3rd		2nd	
Prize of Moscow News			3rd			
Rotary Watches		3rd	3rd			
Skate Canada					3rd	
Winter Universiade				2nd		
International
Soviet Champ.	1st	3rd	1st			3rd
