= Lukas Britschgi =

Swiss figure skater (born 1998)

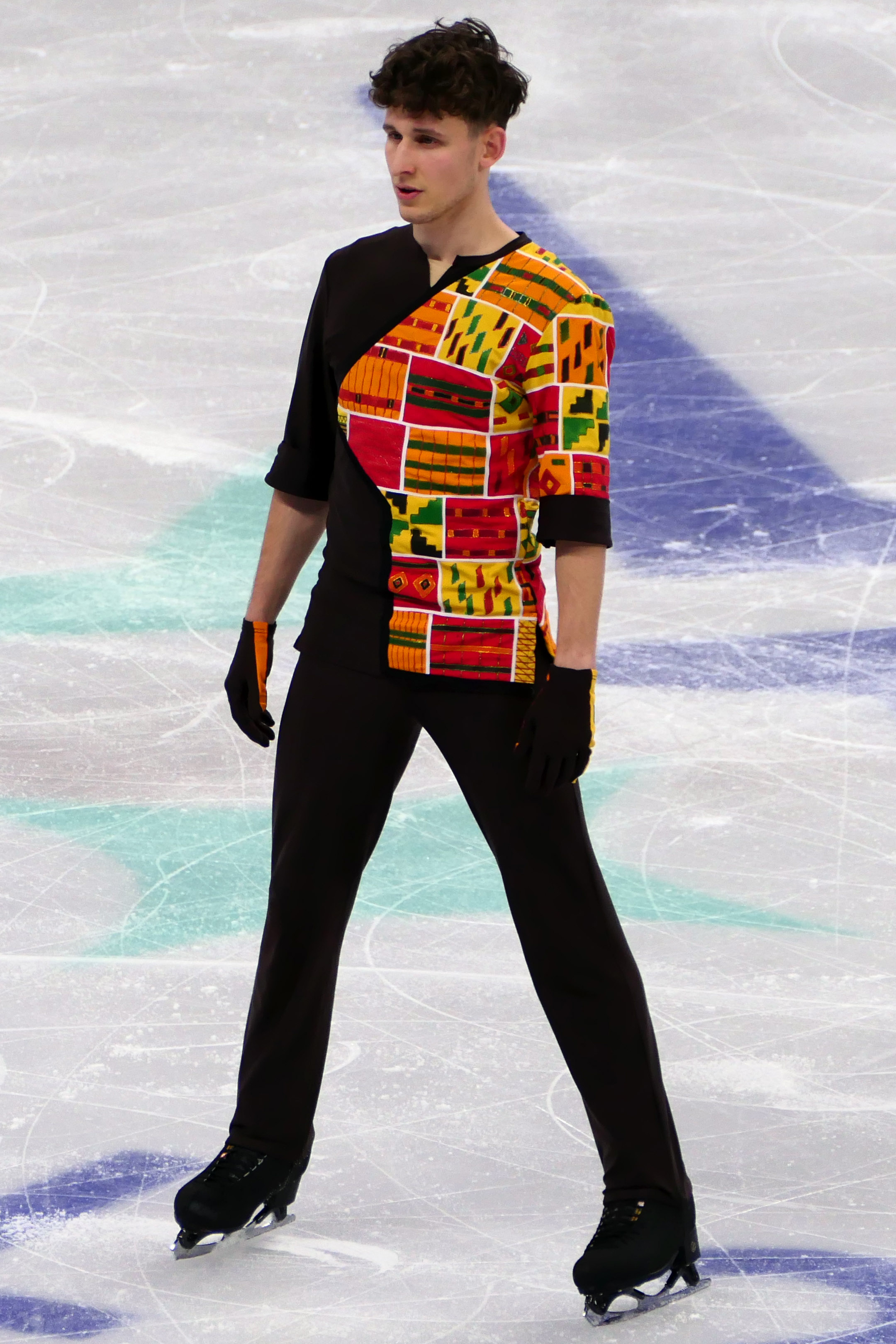
- Britschgi at the 2024 World Championships

Personal information
- Born: 17 February 1998 (age 28) Schaffhausen, Switzerland
- Height: 1.70 m (5 ft 7 in)

Figure skating career
- Country: Switzerland
- Discipline: Men's singles
- Coach: Michael Huth
- Skating club: ES Frauenfeld
- Began skating: 2005

Medal record
European Championships
Gold medal – first place	2025 Tallinn	Singles
Bronze medal – third place	2023 Espoo	Singles
Swiss Championships
Gold medal – first place	2019 Wetzikon	Singles
Gold medal – first place	2020 Biel/Bienne	Singles
Gold medal – first place	2022 Lucerne	Singles
Gold medal – first place	2024 Küsnacht	Singles
Gold medal – first place	2025 Geneva	Singles
Gold medal – first place	2026 Lugano	Singles
Silver medal – second place	2017 Lucerne	Singles
Bronze medal – third place	2018 Neuchâtel	Singles

Lukas Britschgi (born 17 February 1998) is a Swiss figure skater. He is the 2025 European champion, 2023 European bronze medalist, a two-time Grand Prix medalist, a nine-time ISU Challenger Series medalist (including gold at the 2023 Warsaw Cup), and a six-time Swiss national champion (2019–20, 2022, 2024–26).

He represented Switzerland at the 2022 and the 2026 Winter Olympics.

Britschgi is the first Swiss man to win the European Championships title since 1947.

== Personal life ==
Britschgi was born on February 17, 1998, in Schaffhausen, Switzerland. Coming from a family of athletes, Britschgi's mother is a former competitive ice dancer and his brother is a soccer player.

Britschgi is bilingual, able to communicate in German and English fluently.

His figure skating idol is Stéphane Lambiel. In addition to figure skating, Britschgi also enjoys playing tennis.

== Career ==
=== Early career ===
Britschgi began figure skating in 2005 at six or seven years old, having been introduced to the sport by his mother, who as a figure skating coach, would bring Britschgi and his brother to the rink while their father was at work.

Initially skating only for fun, he did not decide to become a competitive figure skater until around the age of fourteen.

He debuted at the 2014–15 Swiss Junior Championships, where he won the silver medal.

=== 2015–16 season: International junior debut ===
Britschgi debuted on the 2015–16 Junior Grand Prix series, placing fifteenth at 2015 JGP Latvia. He then went on to finish fifth at the 2015 Leo Scheu Memorial, fourth at the 2015 Merano Cup, and seventh at the 2015 NRW Trophy.

At the 2015–16 Swiss Junior Championships, Britschgi won the gold medal. He closed his season with a fifth place finish at the 2016 Bavarian Open.

=== 2016–17 season: Senior debut ===
Britschgi started the season on the 2016–17 Junior Grand Prix series, placing tenth at the 2016 JGP Czech Republic and thirteenth at the 2016 JGP Germany. He went on to place fourth at the 2016 Cup of Nice and thirteenth at the 2016 Tallinn Trophy.

Competing at his first senior Swiss Championships, Britschgi won the silver medal. He ended his season at the 2017 Bavarian Open, where he placed tenth.

=== 2017–18 season ===
Prior to the season, Britschgi decided to relocate to Oberstdorf, Germany, with Michael Huth becoming his coach.

Britschgi opened the season with a fifteenth-place finish at the 2017 Ondrej Nepela Trophy, a tenth-place finish at the 2017 Cup of Nice, a bronze medal at the 2017 Golden Bear of Zagreb, and a twelfth-place finish at the 2017 Warsaw Cup.

He then went on to win the bronze medal at the 2017–18 Swiss Championships and closed his season with a silver medal at the 2018 Bavarian Open.

=== 2018–19 season: First national title ===
Britschgi opened his season at the 2018 Finlandia Trophy, finishing in eighth place. He then went on to place eighth at the 2018 Ice Star, ninth at the 2018 CS Alpen Trophy, and eighth at the 2018 Warsaw Cup.

At the 2018–19 Swiss Championships, Britschgi won his first national title and was subsequently selected to represent Switzerland at the 2019 European Championships in Minsk, Belarus, and the 2019 World Championships in Saitama, Japan. At the European Championships, Britschgi placed thirty-first in the short program, failing to qualify for the free skate segment of the competition and finishing thirty-first overall. He then went on to win the bronze medal at the 2019 International Challenge Cup.

Britschgi concluded his season at the World Championships, where he placed thirty-fourth in the short program, not qualifying for the free skate segment of the competition and finished thirty-fourth overall.

=== 2019–20 season ===
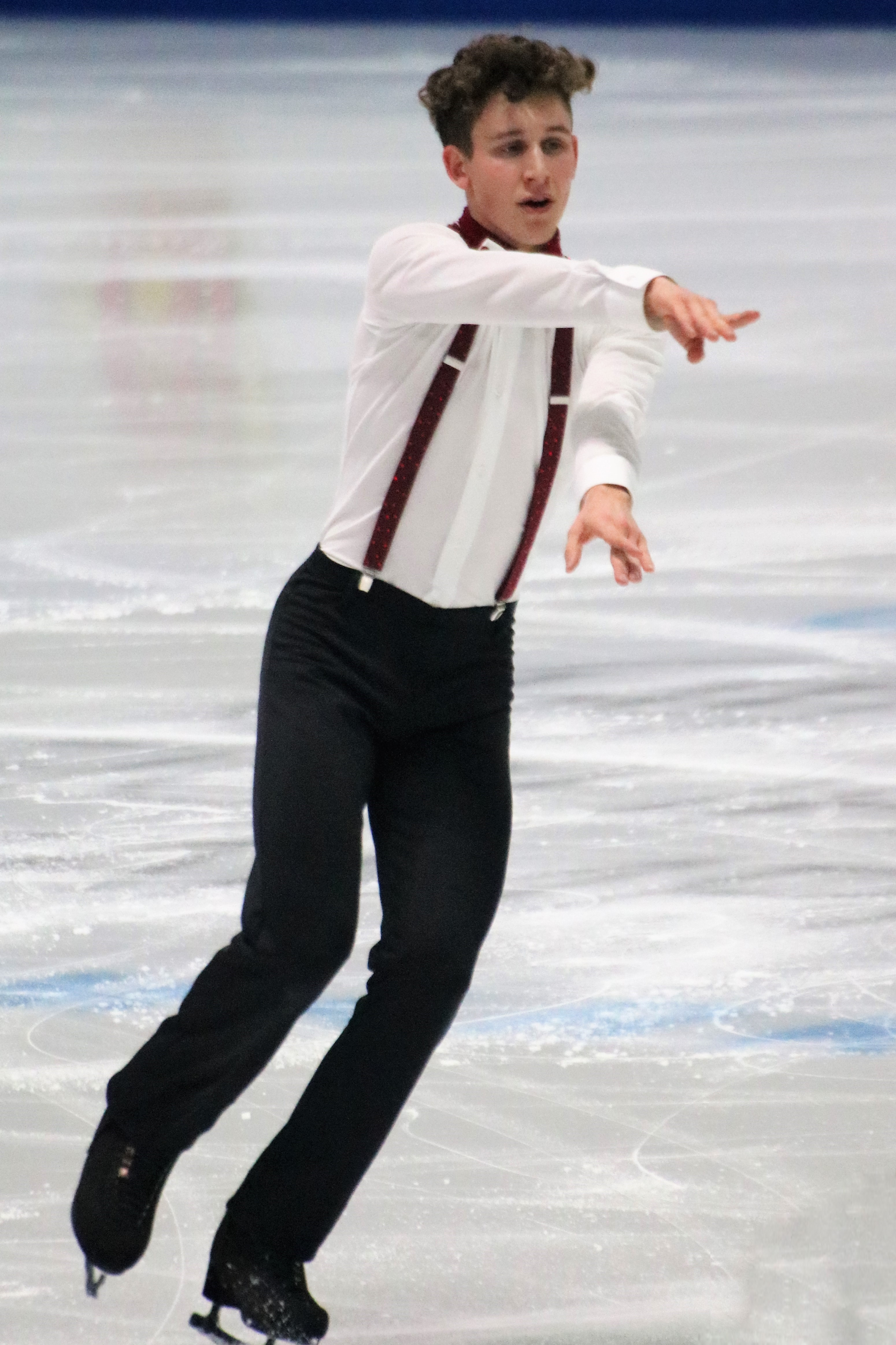
Britschgi at the 2020 European Championships

Britschgi started his season by winning the bronze medal at the 2018 Golden Bear of Zagreb as well as finishing sixth at both the 2019 Volvo Open Cup and the 2019 Warsaw Cup. Britschgi then went on to win his second consecutive title at the 2019–20 Swiss Championships.

At the 2020 European Championships in Graz, Austria, Britschgi finished in nineteenth place after placing twenty-second in the short program and nineteenth in the free skate. He then went on to place fourth at the 2020 International Challenge Cup.

Although selected to compete at the 2020 World Championships, the event was ultimately cancelled due to the COVID-19 pandemic.

=== 2020–21 season ===
Britschgi began the season with an eighth-place finish at the 2020 Nebelhorn Trophy.

Despite the 2020–21 Swiss Championships being cancelled due to the COVID-19 pandemic, Britschgi was ultimately selected to compete at the 2021 World Championships in Stockholm, Sweden. He went on to place fifteenth at the event after placing seventeenth in the short program and sixteenth in the free skate. With this placement, Britschgi was able to secure one spot for Swiss men's singles skating at the 2022 Winter Olympics.

=== 2021–22 season: Beijing Olympics ===
Britschgi started the season by competing at the 2021 Finlandia Trophy, the 2021 Asian Open Trophy, and the 2021 Warsaw Cup, where he placed eighth, fifth, and seventh, respectively. He then went on to win the gold medal at the 2021 NRW Trophy.

At the 2021–22 Swiss Championships, Britschgi won his third national title and was subsequently named to the European, Olympic, and World team. He went on to place eleventh at the 2022 European Championships in Tallinn, Estonia, after placing thirteenth in the short program and eleventh in the free skate.

At the 2022 Winter Olympics in Beijing, China, Britschgi managed to qualify for the free skate segment of the competition after placing twenty-fourth in the short program. In the free program, Britschgi placed twenty-third and moved up to twenty-third place overall.

Shortly prior the 2022 World Championships, Britschgi tested positive for COVID-19 and was forced to withdraw from the event.

=== 2022–23 season: European bronze ===
Britschgi began his season by finishing fifth at the 2022 Finlandia Trophy, before going on to compete at the 2022 Budapest Trophy where he won the silver medal. He then went on to make his Grand Prix series debut at 2022 Skate Canada International, where he finished sixth. Shortly before the 2022 Grand Prix de France, Mikhail Shaidorov of Kazakhstan withdrew and Britschgi was called up to replace him.

At the 2022 Warsaw Cup, Britschgi won the bronze medal after skating a clean short and free program, scoring personal bests in the process. Following the event, however, he fell off his bicycle and broke his collar bone and had to five weeks off the ice to recover. As a result, Britschgi had to miss the 2022–23 Swiss Championships.

Competing at the 2023 European Championships in Espoo, Finland, Britschgi placed fifth in the short program after fall on his quad toe loop attempt. However, he managed to perform a near perfect free skate, placing third in that segment of the competition and winning the bronze medal. His bronze medal was the highest finish for a Swiss skater of any discipline at the European Championships in over a decade. Following the event, Britschgi said he was "relieved" to have performed so well with only four weeks of post-accident training. This placement granted two spots for Swiss men's singles skaters at the 2024 European Championships.

At the 2023 World Championships in Saitama, Japan, Britschgi placed ninth in both the short and free program segments of the competition and finished in eighth place overall, scoring a new personal best free skate and combined total score in the process. 's top ten finish guaranteed two spots for Swiss men's singles skaters at the 2024 World Championships.

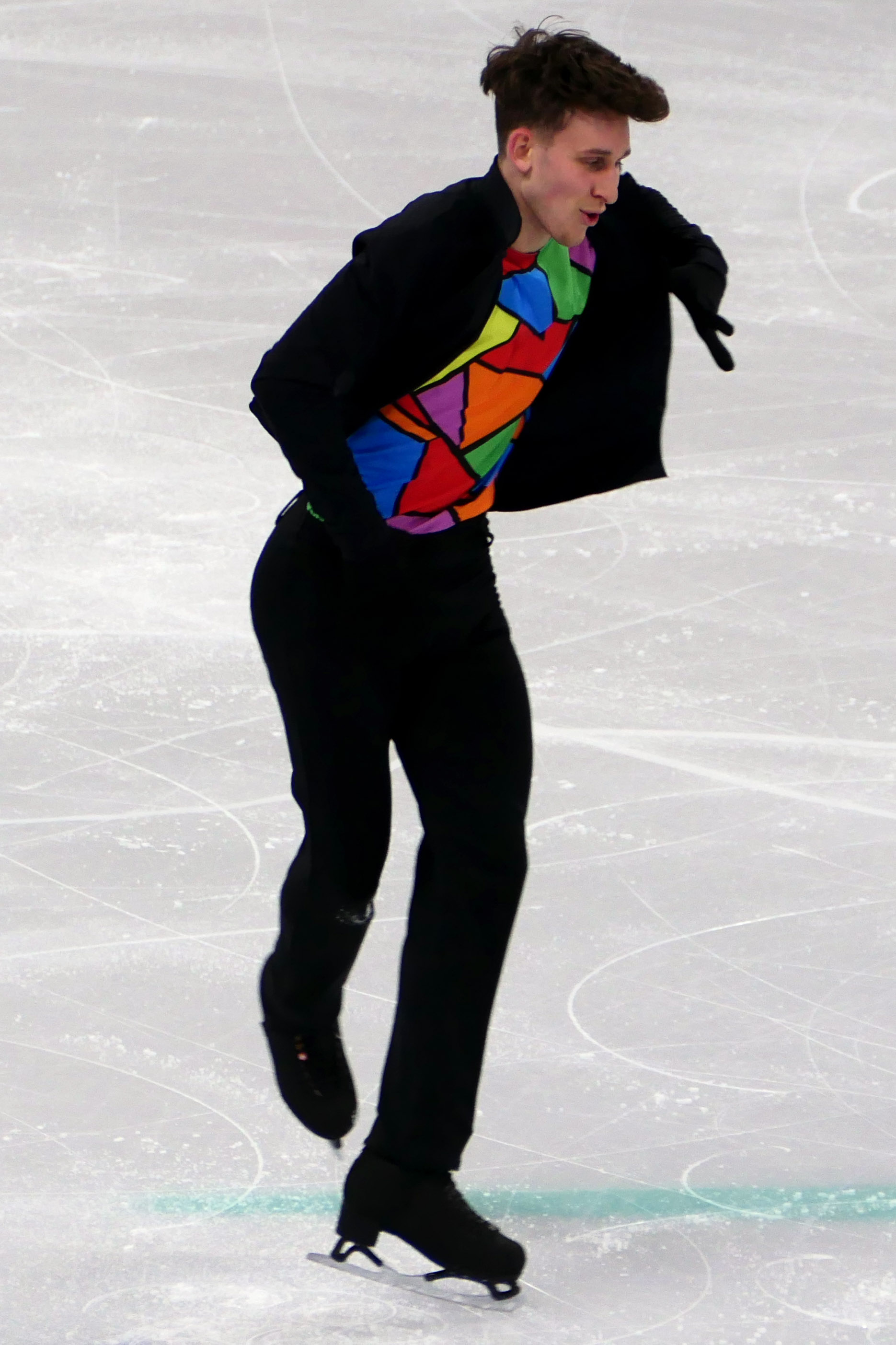
Britschgi performing his short program at the 2024 World Championships

=== 2023–24 season: First Grand Prix medal ===
Britschgi began the season with two appearances on the Challenger circuit, finishing fourth at the 2023 Finlandia Trophy before winning the silver medal the next week at the 2023 Budapest Trophy. At the Grand Prix, he placed fourth at the 2023 Grand Prix de France, including a third-place finish in the free skate with a new personal best score. His total score of 263.43 would have been sufficient to win the gold medal at the 2023 Skate Canada International the prior week. In between Grand Prix appearances, Britschgi competed at the 2023 Warsaw Cup, winning the gold medal, his first Challenger title. At the 2023 NHK Trophy, he placed third in both segments to win the bronze medal, a result he described as "amazing." This was the first Grand Prix medal for a Swiss skater since Sarah Meier and Stéphane Lambiel's silver medals on the 2007–08 circuit.

After winning another Swiss national title, Britschgi was assigned to the 2024 European Championships in Kaunas. He finished second in the short program, but errors in the free skate dropped him to fifth overall. At the 2024 World Championships in Montreal, Britschgi finished sixth, despite dealing with a left knee injury. Of finishing in the top six, he said "I never thought that would be possible."

=== 2024–25 season: European gold ===
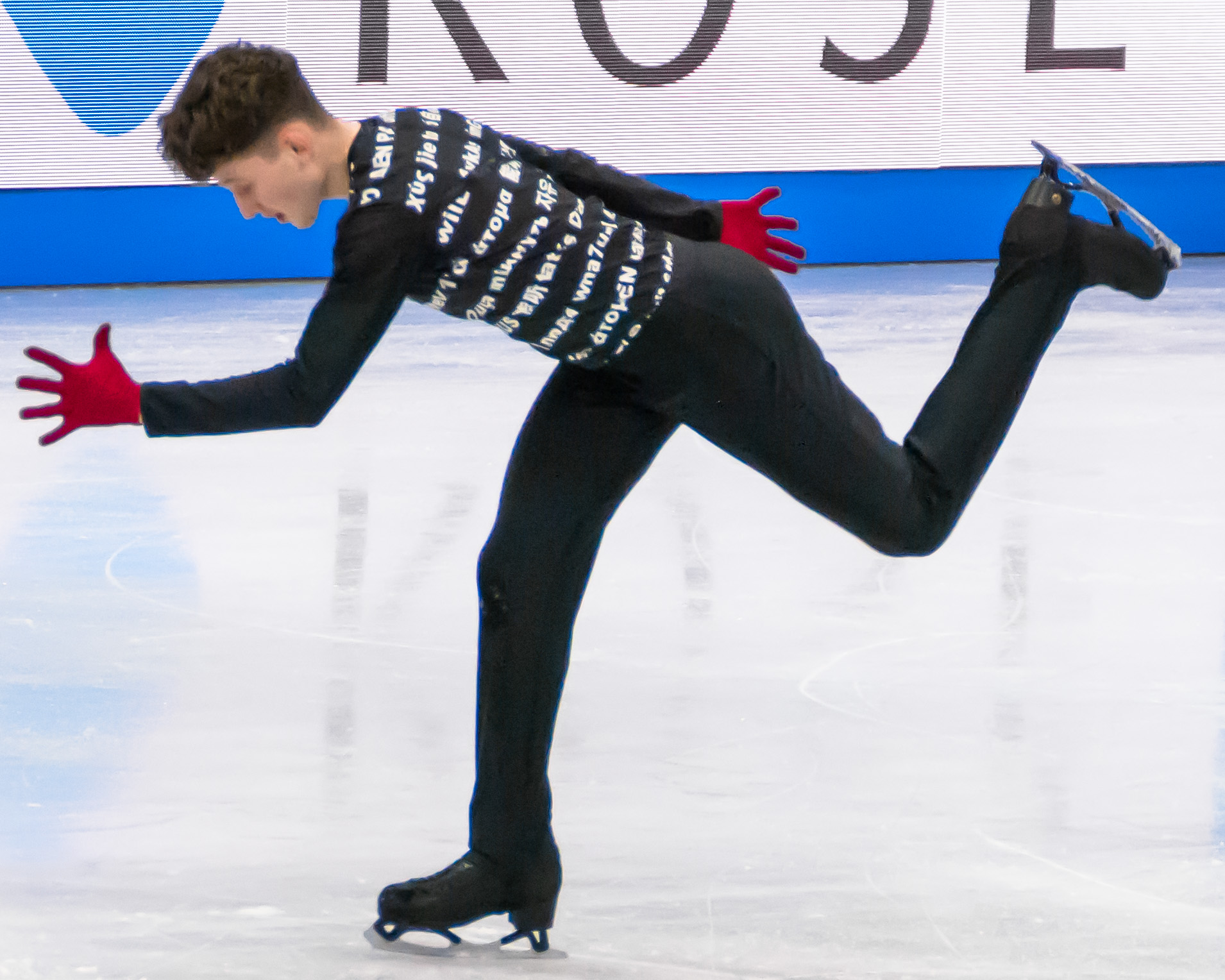
Britschgi performing his short program at the 2025 World Championships

Britschgi's short program incorporated sign language as part of his performance during a section of the song that quoted Charlie Chaplin's ending speech from his film The Great Dictator. Brischgi said his program was not meant as a specific political statement, but as a call for more peace in the world.

He started his season by competing on the 2024–25 ISU Challenger Series, winning silver at the 2024 Budapest Trophy and the 2024 Trophée Métropole Nice Côte d'Azur.

Going on to compete on the 2024–25 Grand Prix circuit, Brischgi finished ninth at the 2024 Grand Prix de France. Following the event, he shared that his preparation for the competition was hindered by a knee injury he had sustained prior. Two weeks later, Britsghi delivered stronger performances at the 2024 Finlandia Trophy, where he placed fifth. “It’s a relief,” he said. “This is a competition and a result I can build on. I am quite pleased.”

In early December, Britschgi won his fifth national title at the 2025 Swiss Championships. Ahead of the 2025 European Championships in January, held in Tallinn, he struggled with issues with his patellar tendon. At the championships, he was in eighth place after the short program, but rose to first place to win the championships after the free skate, where he landed two quads and two triple Axels. He was the first Swiss man to win the European Championships since Hans Gerschwiler in 1947. In the winner's interview afterward, Britschgi expressed surprise at his victory. “It wasn’t even a dream of mine to come out on top of the podium,” he said, after he was announced as the new champion. “We have so many great skaters here who are for sure better than me. I am just incredibly happy.”

Ahead of the 2025 World Championships, he cut himself during training at Art on Ice. The cut became infected and had to be operated on, which interrupted his preparations for the championships. He finished in twelfth place overall and won Switzerland a quota in the men's event at the upcoming 2026 Winter Olympics. “Next, I actually have to take eight weeks off to do rehabilitation for my knee,” he said. “That means eight weeks off the ice. Three of those weeks, I’ll use for vacation."

=== 2025–26 season: Milano Cortina Olympics ===
Britschgi opened his season at 2025 Nebelhorn Trophy, where he won the bronze medal. He then competed on the 2025–26 Grand Prix circuit, placing fourth at 2025 Grand Prix de France. Three weeks later, Britschgi captured the bronze at 2025 NHK Trophy. "I have flashbacks," he said. "Two years ago, I was also here with Yuma and back then it was with Shoma. I'm very happy to be on the podium again." One week following the event, he won the silver medal at the 2025 CS Warsaw Cup.

In December, he won his sixth national title at the 2026 Swiss Championships. The following month, Britschgi placed fourth at the 2026 European Figure Skating Championships. "Now I can really focus on the Olympics," he said after the event. "Before, there was always another competition that I was practicing for, but now I can give all the power and energy I have towards the Olympics." After the event, Britschgi was officially named to the 2026 Winter Olympic team.

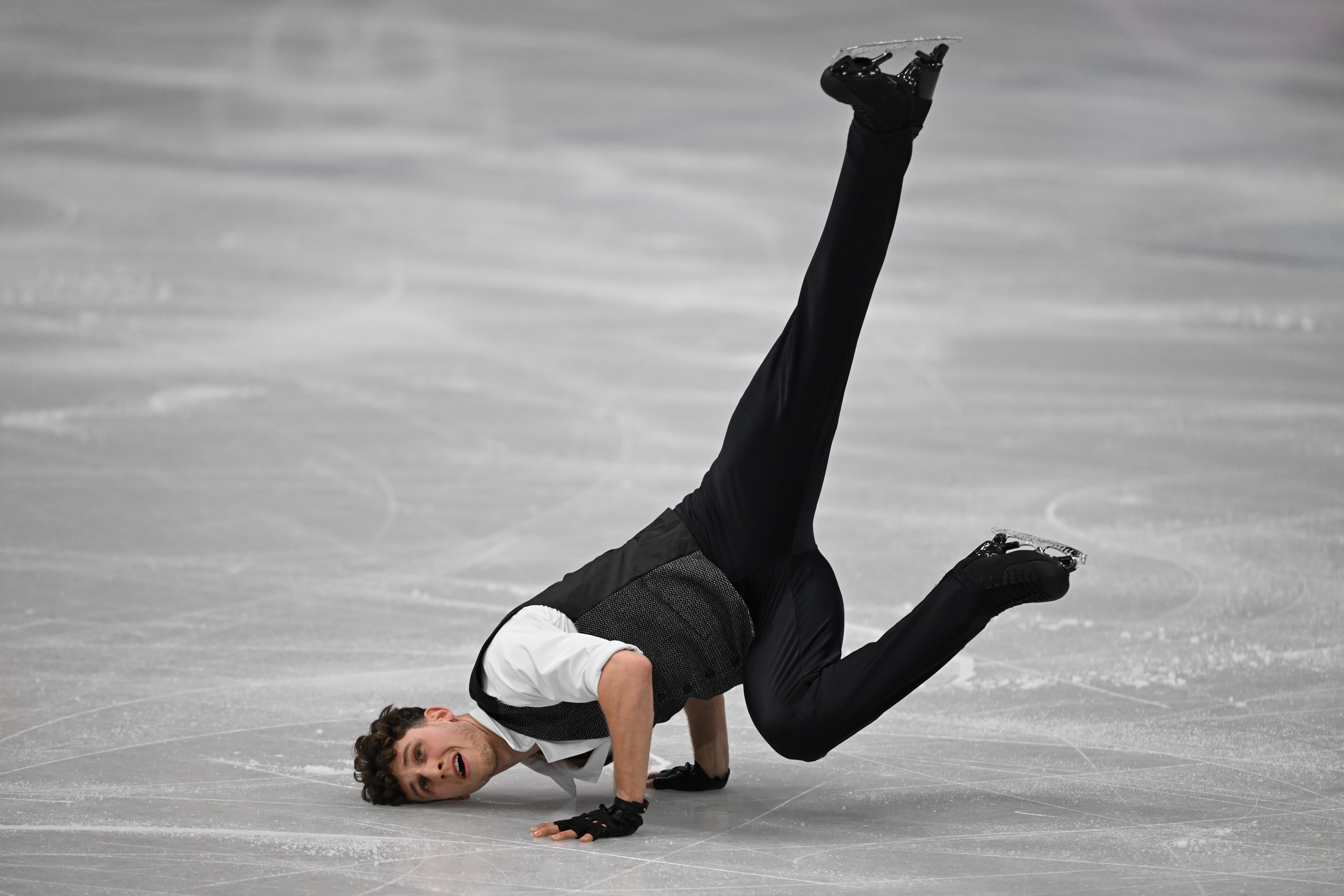
Britschgi at the 2026 Winter Olympics

On 10 February, Britschgi competed in the short program segment of the 2026 Winter Olympics. He placed nineteenth in the short program after missing a planned quad toe. "My practices were perfect," he said following his performance. "I did not make a single mistake or almost no mistakes, all the run-throughs I did were really, really good. Today I was hesitating on my quads while thinking I have to do it the same way. But hesitating was the mistake... We were on a really high level and I felt at the same level to be honest. But I was not able to show it today on the ice. That's the tough part about figure skating. I have to come back." Two days later, he delivered a stronger free skate performance, placing thirteenth in that segment and moving up to fourteenth place overall.

In March, Britschgi competed at the 2026 World Championships. He placed ninth in the short program and tenth in the free skate, finishing ninth overall and securing a second spot for Switzerland in the next year's World Championships. He set season's best scores in both the short program and the total score. "I don’t really know yet what that means to me," he said of the score. "Maybe next season I can approach things a bit more relaxed. This season had quite a lot of pressure, and I hope I can take some of that pressure away next season."

== Programs ==
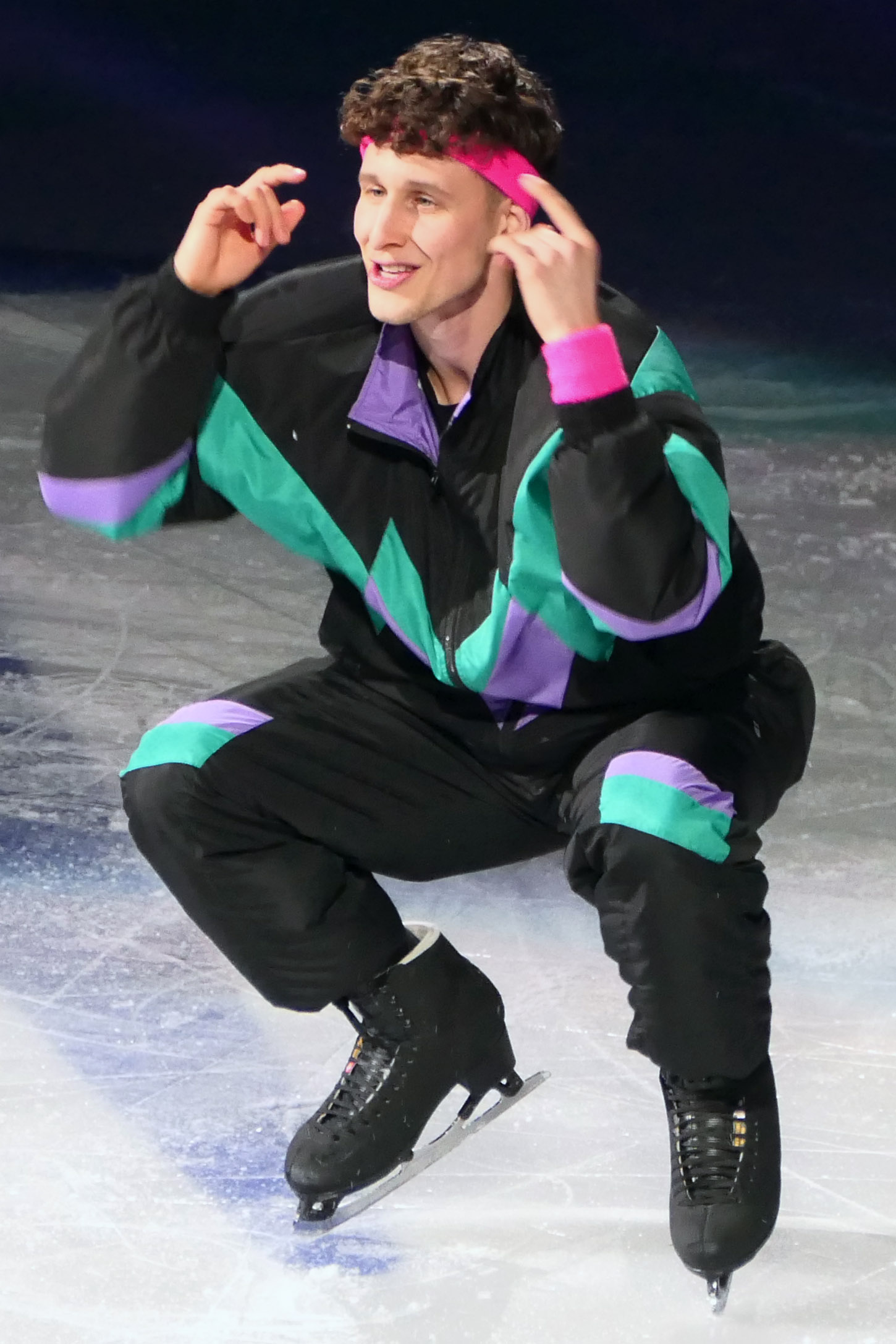
Britschgi during the gala at the 2024 World Championships

Season	Short program	Free skating	Exhibition
2025–2026	No Good by KALEO choreo. by Andrea Vaturi	Journey through the Orient; Eastern Intro by Jeff van Dyck; Shadows Over Persia by Håkan Glänte; Epic Middle East Female Vocal Trailer by Andrea Krux; Middle Eastern by India Happy choreo. by Adam Solya	They Don't Care About Us; Dangerous; Smooth Criminal by Michael Jackson
2024–2025	Iron Sky by Paolo Nutini & Charlie Chaplin choreo. by Andrea Vaturi	Lux; Deeply; Aero by Ryan Taubert choreo. by Adam Solya	Technologic by Daft Punk; Sexy and I Know It by LMFAO; Jump Around by House of Pain; Single Ladies (Put a Ring on It) by Beyoncé; Billie Jean by Michael Jackson; Stayin' Alive by Bee Gees
2023–2024	I'm in the Mood by John Lee Hooker; Superstition by Stevie Wonder performed by Chris Blue choreo. by Andrea Vaturi	The Rainmaker (from The Power of One) by Hans Zimmer; Enduring Hope by Daniel Deuschle; Corpus Rex by Safri Duo choreo. by Adam Solya	The Fresh Prince of Bel-Air theme song (from The Fresh Prince of Bel-Air) by DJ Jazzy Jeff & the Fresh Prince; It's Not Unusual by Tom Jones; Apache (Jump on It!) by The Sugarhill Gang
2022–2023	Another Level by Tyrone Wells, Dustin Burnett performed by Oh the Larceny choreo. by Andrea Vaturi	An Honourable Choice by Saunder Jurriaans, Danny Bensi; Sacrifice of Tradition by Ilan Eshkeri; Trap by OBC9LHKA; Knight / Promises by Saunder Jurriaans, Danny Bensi choreo. by Adam Solya	Giant by Calvin Harris and Rag'n'Bone Man
2021–2022	Keeping Me Alive by Jonathan Roy choreo. by Andrea Vaturi	Euphoria: Mount Everest; Forever; Still Don't Know My Name by Labrinth choreo. by Adam Solya	
2020–2021	Amber by The Gardener & The Tree choreo. by Michael Huth, Rostislav Sinicyn	Hallelujah I Love Her So; Hard Times by Ray Charles; Soda Pop by Robbie Williams choreo. by Michael Huth, Rostislav Sinicyn	
2019–2020	Nothing Else Matters by Metallica choreo. by Michael Huth, Rostislav Sinicyn	Hallelujah I Love Her So; Hard Times by Ray Charles; Soda Pop by Robbie Williams choreo. by Michael Huth, Rostislav Sinicyn	
2018–2019	Love Is a Bitch by Two Feet choreo. by Rostislav Sinicyn	The Blues Brothers medley choreo. by Michael Huth	
2017–2018	Hells Bells by AC/DC; Black Betty by Ram Jam choreo. by Rostislav Sinicyn	The Blues Brothers medley choreo. by Michael Huth	
2016–2017	Hells Bells by AC/DC; Black Betty by Ram Jam choreo. by Rostislav Sinicyn	The Artist by Ludovic Bource choreo. by Rostislav Sinicyn	
2015–2016	Sing, Sing, Sing performed by Benny Goodman choreo. by Rostislav Sinicyn	The Artist by Ludovic Bource choreo. by Rostislav Sinicyn	

== Competitive highlights ==
- GP – Event of the ISU Grand Prix Series
- JGP – Event of the ISU Junior Grand Prix Series
- CS – Event of the ISU Challenger Series
- C – Event was cancelled
- TBD – Assigned
- WD – Withdrew from competition

Competition placements at senior level
Season	2016–17	2017–18	2018–19	2019–20	2020–21	2021–22	2022–23	2023–24	2024-25	2025–26	2026-27
Winter Olympics						23rd				14th	
World Championships			34th	C	15th		8th	6th	12th	9th	
European Championships			31st	19th		11th	3rd	5th	1st	4th	
Swiss Championships	2nd	3rd	1st	1st	C	1st		1st	1st	1st	
GP Finland									5th		
GP France							7th	4th	9th	4th	
GP NHK Trophy								3rd		3rd	TBD
GP Skate America											6th
GP Skate Canada							6th				
CS Alpen Trophy			9th								
CS Budapest Trophy							2nd	2nd	2nd		3rd
CS Finlandia Trophy			8th			8th	5th	4th			
CS Nebelhorn Trophy					8th					3rd	
CS Nepela Memorial		15th									
CS Tallinn Trophy	13th										
CS Trophée Métropole Nice		10th							2nd		
CS Warsaw Cup		12th	8th	6th		7th	3rd	1st		2nd	
Asian Open Trophy						5th					
Bavarian Open	10th	2nd									
Challenge Cup			3rd	4th							
Golden Bear of Zagreb		3rd		3rd							
Ice Star			8th								
NRW Trophy					3rd	1st					
Sofia Trophy	2nd										
Volvo Open Cup				6th							

Competition placements at junior level
Season	2014–15	2015–16	2016–17
Swiss Championships	2nd	1st	
JGP Czech Republic			10th
JGP Germany			13th
JGP Latvia		15th	
Bavarian Open		5th	
Cup of Nice			4th
Leo Scheu Memorial		5th	
Merano Cup		4th	
NRW Trophy		7th	

== Detailed results ==
ISU personal best scores in the +5/-5 GOE System
Segment	Type	Score	Event
Total	TSS	274.09	2024 World Championships
Short program	TSS	93.41	2024 World Championships
Short program	TES	50.93	2023 CS Warsaw Cup
Short program	PCS	42.89	2024 World Championships
Free skating	TSS	184.19	2025 European Championships
Free skating	TES	98.31	2025 European Championships
Free skating	PCS	86.08	2024 World Championships

ISU personal best scores in the +3/-3 GOE System
Segment	Type	Score	Event
Total	TSS	171.81	2017 CS Warsaw Cup
Short program	TSS	57.51	2017 CS Warsaw Cup
Short program	TES	29.61	2016 JGP Czech Republic
Short program	PCS	30.35	2017 CS Warsaw Cup
Free skating	TSS	119.99	2016 CS Tallinn Trophy
Free skating	TES	61.19	2016 CS Tallinn Trophy
Free skating	PCS	60.80	2017 CS Ondrej Nepela Trophy

- Small medals for the short program and free skating are only awarded at ISU Championships.

=== Senior level ===
Results in the 2016–17 season
Date	Event	SP		FS		Total	
Date	Event	P	Score	P	Score	P	Score
Nov 20–27, 2016	(Estonia) 2016 CS Tallinn Trophy	16	45.09	9	119.99	13	165.08
Dec 15–17, 2016	(Switzerland) 2017 Swiss Championships	4	53.99	2	116.61	2	170.60
Feb 8–12, 2017	(Bulgaria) 2017 Sofia Trophy	3	57.57	2	123.13	2	180.70
Feb 14–19, 2017	(Germany) 2017 Bavarian Open	11	55.94	8	123.43	10	179.37

Results in the 2017–18 season
Date	Event	SP		FS		Total	
Date	Event	P	Score	P	Score	P	Score
Sep 21–23, 2017	(Slovakia) 2017 CS Ondrej Nepela Trophy	15	54.19	15	107.87	15	162.06
Oct 11–15, 2017	(France) 2017 Cup of Nice	10	61.51	10	120.59	10	182.10
Oct 26–29, 2017	(Croatia) 2017 Golden Bear of Zagreb	4	51.65	3	112.08	3	163.73
Nov 16–19, 2017	(Poland) 2017 CS Warsaw Cup	13	57.51	10	114.30	12	171.81
Dec 15–16, 2017	(Switzerland) 2018 Swiss Championships	1	61.88	3	113.42	3	175.30
Jan 26–31, 2018	(Germany) 2018 Bavarian Open	2	68.70	3	130.37	2	199.07

Results in the 2018–19 season
Date	Event	SP		FS		Total	
Date	Event	P	Score	P	Score	P	Score
Oct 4–7, 2018	(Finland) 2018 CS Finlandia Trophy	10	68.40	8	138.36	8	206.76
Oct 18–20, 2018	(Belarus) 2018 Ice Star	4	69.03	10	105.89	8	174.92
Nov 11–18, 2018	(Austria) 2018 CS Alpen Trophy	9	62.16	9	120.11	9	182.27
Nov 23–25, 2018	(Poland) 2018 Warsaw Cup	10	55.52	4	121.69	8	177.21
Dec 14–16, 2018	(Switzerland) 2019 Swiss Championships	1	71.67	1	139.05	1	210.72
Jan 21–27, 2019	(Belarus) 2019 European Championships	31	55.86	–	–	31	55.86
Feb 21–24, 2019	(Netherlands) 2019 International Challenge Cup	3	70.43	3	136.45	3	206.88
Mar 18–24, 2019	(Japan) 2019 World Championships	34	54.58	–	–	34	54.58

Results in the 2019–20 season
Date	Event	SP		FS		Total	
Date	Event	P	Score	P	Score	P	Score
Oct 24–27, 2019	(Croatia) 2019 Golden Bear of Zagreb	6	60.41	3	126.05	3	186.46
Nov 5–10, 2019	(Latvia) 2019 Volvo Open Cup	4	70.05	10	123.59	6	193.64
Nov 14–17, 2019	(Poland) 2019 CS Warsaw Cup	7	66.60	7	122.83	6	189.43
Dec 7–8, 2019	(Switzerland) 2020 Swiss Championships	1	73.58	1	132.40	1	205.98
Jan 20–26, 2020	(Austria) 2020 European Championships	22	66.32	19	124.43	19	190.75
Feb 20–23, 2020	(Netherlands) 2020 International Challenge Cup	6	69.02	5	132.96	4	201.98

Results in the 2020–21 season
Date	Event	SP		FS		Total	
Date	Event	P	Score	P	Score	P	Score
Sep 23–26, 2020	(Germany) 2020 CS Nebelhorn Trophy	11	66.63	4	143.53	8	210.16
Nov 26–29, 2020	(Germany) 2020 NRW Trophy	5	64.52	2	119.71	3	184.23
Mar 22–28, 2021	(Sweden) 2021 World Championships	17	78.27	16	147.28	15	225.55

Results in the 2021–22 season
Date	Event	SP		FS		Total	
Date	Event	P	Score	P	Score	P	Score
Oct 7–10, 2021	(Finland) 2021 CS Finlandia Trophy	15	65.28	8	145.81	8	211.09
Oct 13–17, 2021	(China) 2021 Asian Open Trophy	6	69.07	3	147.97	5	217.04
Nov 4–7, 2021	(Germany) 2021 NRW Trophy	1	76.42	1	142.14	1	218.56
Nov 18–21, 2021	(Poland) 2021 CS Warsaw Cup	6	79.34	12	134.42	7	213.76
Nov 27–28, 2021	(Switzerland) 2022 Swiss Championships	1	85.13	1	155.28	1	240.41
Jan 10–16, 2022	(Estonia) 2022 European Championships	13	72.96	11	145.95	11	218.91
Feb 8–10, 2022	(China) 2022 Winter Olympics	24	76.16	23	136.42	23	212.58

Results in the 2022–23 season
Date	Event	SP		FS		Total	
Date	Event	P	Score	P	Score	P	Score
Oct 5–9, 2022	(Finland) 2022 CS Finlandia Trophy	10	66.62	4	149.80	5	216.42
Oct 13–16, 2022	(Hungary) 2022 CS Budapest Trophy	5	72.85	2	166.81	2	239.66
Oct 28–30, 2022	2022 Skate Canada International	8	64.35	6	148.08	6	212.43
Nov 4–6, 2022	2022 Grand Prix de France	9	74.25	7	148.61	7	222.86
Nov 17–20, 2022	(Poland) 2022 CS Warsaw Cup	2	86.51	3	167.15	3	253.66
Jan 25–29, 2023	(Finland) 2023 European Championships	5	79.26	3	168.75	3	248.01
Mar 22–26, 2023	(Japan) 2023 World Championships	9	86.18	9	171.16	8	257.34

Results in the 2023–24 season
Date	Event	SP		FS		Total	
Date	Event	P	Score	P	Score	P	Score
Oct 6–8, 2023	(Finland) 2023 CS Finlandia Trophy	6	74.02	4	155.35	4	229.37
Oct 13–15, 2023	(Hungary) 2023 CS Budapest Trophy	6	77.78	1	168.34	2	246.12
Nov 3–5, 2023	2023 Grand Prix de France	4	86.94	3	176.49	4	263.43
Nov 15–19, 2023	(Poland) 2023 CS Warsaw Cup	1	91.51	3	154.71	1	246.22
Nov 24–26, 2023	(Japan) 2023 NHK Trophy	3	86.42	3	168.18	3	254.60
Dec 15–17, 2023	(Switzerland) 2024 Swiss Championships	1	93.09	1	171.80	1	264.89
Jan 10–14, 2024	(Lithuania) 2024 European Championships	2	91.17	10	151.29	5	242.46
Mar 18–24, 2024	(Canada) 2024 World Championships	5	93.41	4	180.68	6	274.09

Results in the 2024–25 season
Date	Event	SP		FS		Total	
Date	Event	P	Score	P	Score	P	Score
Oct 11–13, 2024	(Hungary) 2024 CS Budapest Trophy	2	82.92	2	155.10	2	238.02
Oct 16–20, 2024	(France) 2024 CS Trophée Métropole Nice Côte d'Azur	2	87.98	4	145.24	2	233.22
Nov 1–3, 2024	2024 Grand Prix de France	7	77.09	9	135.85	9	212.94
Nov 15–17, 2024	(Finland) 2024 Finlandia Trophy	5	80.44	4	166.26	5	246.70
Dec 13–15, 2024	(Switzerland) 2025 Swiss Championships	1	90.84	1	176.18	1	267.02
Jan 28 – Feb 2, 2025	(Estonia) 2025 European Championships	8	82.90	1	184.19	1	267.09
Mar 25–30, 2025	(United States) 2025 World Championships	11	85.83	14	158.36	12	244.19

Results in the 2025–26 season
Date	Event	SP		FS		Total	
Date	Event	P	Score	P	Score	P	Score
Sep 25–27, 2025	(Germany) 2025 CS Nebelhorn Trophy	4	85.16	5	151.90	3	236.06
Oct 17–19, 2025	2025 Grand Prix de France	7	78.68	3	170.36	4	249.04
Nov 7–9, 2025	(Japan) 2025 NHK Trophy	5	83.45	3	163.49	3	246.94
Nov 19–23, 2025	(Poland) 2025 CS Warsaw Cup	2	82.76	2	146.97	2	229.73
Dec 19–21, 2025	(Switzerland) 2026 Swiss Championships	1	93.90	1	175.43	1	269.33
Jan 13–18, 2026	(United Kingdom) 2026 European Championships	6	82.12	5	154.78	4	236.90
Feb 10–13, 2026	(Italy) 2026 Winter Olympics	19	80.87	13	165.77	14	246.64
Mar 24–29, 2026	(Czech Republic) 2026 World Championships	9	88.30	10	163.60	9	251.90

Results in the 2026–27 season
Date	Event	SP		FS		Total	
Date	Event	P	Score	P	Score	P	Score
Oct 15-18, 2026	(Hungary) 2026 CS Budapest Trophy	4	80.05	3	159.96	3	240.01
Nov 13–15, 2026	(United States) 2026 Skate America	9	80.88	6	150.71	6	231.59

=== Junior level ===
Results in the 2014–15 season
Date	Event	SP		FS		Total	
Date	Event	P	Score	P	Score	P	Score
Jan 17–18, 2015	(Switzerland) 2015 Swiss Championships (Junior)	1	46.57	3	76.24	2	122.81

Results in the 2015–16 season
Date	Event	SP		FS		Total	
Date	Event	P	Score	P	Score	P	Score
Aug 27–29, 2015	2015 JGP Latvia	21	40.57	15	89.46	15	130.03
Oct 27–31, 2015	(Austria) 2015 Leo Scheu Memorial	3	51.09	5	93.02	5	144.11
Nov 12–15, 2015	(Italy) 2015 Merano Cup	2	48.72	4	89.91	4	138.63
Nov 24–29, 2015	(Germany) 2015 NRW Trophy	7	46.08	7	88.55	7	134.63
Jan 9–10, 2016	(Switzerland) 2016 Swiss Championships (Junior)	1	54.52	1	106.95	1	161.47
Feb 17–21, 2016	(Germany) 2016 Bavarian Open	7	51.23	3	107.60	5	158.83

Results in the 2016–17 season
Date	Event	SP		FS		Total	
Date	Event	P	Score	P	Score	P	Score
Aug 31 – Sep 3, 2016	2016 JGP Czech Republic	12	53.54	10	109.49	10	163.03
Oct 5–8, 2016	2016 JGP Germany	19	48.63	12	105.65	13	154.28
Oct 19–23, 2016	(France) 2016 Cup of Nice	10	48.27	3	105.87	4	154.14
