= Miss Broadway =

Studio album by Belle Epoque
- Released: 1977
- Genre: Disco
- Length: 31:25
- Label: Carrere
- Producer: Prima Linea

Belle Epoque chronology
Miss Broadway (1977)	Bamalama (1978)

Professional ratings
Review scores
Source	Rating
AllMusic	3/5 stars
The Village Voice	B−

Miss Broadway is the debut album by the female trio Belle Epoque, released in 1977. The album includes a disco version of Los Bravos' 1966 hit "Black Is Black".

The second side of the album is a disco medley, in which "Black Is Black" itself appears three times.

The title track was released as a single, reaching #92 in the United States and #11 in France.

== Track listing as appears in record's sleeve ==
=== Side 1 ===
1. "Miss Broadway" (E. Lenton, A. Weyman) – 7:25
2. "Me and You" (E. Lenton) – 5:30
3. "Losing You" (E. Lenton, R. Conrado) – 4:15

=== Side 2 ===
1. a) "Disco Sound" (A. Weyman)
  b) "Black Is Black" (M. Grainger, S. Waday, T. Hayes)
  c) "Why Don't You Lay" (A. Weyman) – 14:15

== Track listing as appears in record's label ==
=== Side 1 ===
Same as the sleeve

=== Side 2 ===
1. "Black is Black / Disco Sound"
2. "Black is Black"
3. "Why Don't You Lay Down"
4. "Black is Black"

== Charts ==
Chart (1978)	Peak position
Australia (Kent Music Report)	40
