= Natalia Karamysheva =

Soviet Russian figure skater (born 1959)

Natalja Karamyševa
Personal information
- Full name: Natalja Germanovna Karamyševa
- Born: 3 August 1959 (age 66) Sverdlovsk, Russian SFSR, Soviet Union

Figure skating career
- Country: Soviet Union

Natalja Germanovna Karamyševa (Russian: Наталья Германовна Карамышева, also romanized as Natalia Karamysheva) (born 3 August 1959) is a former Soviet ice dancer who works as a coach and choreographer. With her husband Rostislav Sinicyn (Sinitsyn), she is the 1978 and 1980 Soviet national champion.

== Career ==
Natalia Karamysheva and Rostislav Sinitsyn placed 5th at the 1979 European Championships and 7th at the 1980 World Championships. They won the silver medal at the 1981 Winter Universiade.

Following her retirement from competitive skating, Karamyševa became a coach and choreographer working in the Czech Republic. Her current and former students and clients include Karolína Procházková / Michal Češka, Jana Čejková / Alexandr Sinicyn, Kamila Hájková / David Vincour, Lucie Myslivečková / Matěj Novák, Jakub Strobl, and Barbora Ulehlova.

== Personal life ==
Karamyševa is married to Rostislav Sinicyn. Their son, Alexandr Sinicyn (born 27 March 1996 in Prague), is a competitive ice dancer for the Czech Republic.

Karamyševa and Karamysheva have both been used to Romanize her surname. Karamyševa is the Czech-style version.

== Results ==
with Rostislav Sinicyn

International
Event	77–78	78–79	79–80	80–81	81–82	82–83
World Champ.			7th			
European Champ.		5th				
NHK Trophy			3rd		2nd	
Prize of Moscow News			3rd			
Rotary Watches		3rd				
Skate Canada					3rd	
Winter Universiade				2nd		
National
Soviet Champ.	1st	3rd	1st			3rd
