= Belle Epoque (band) =

French female vocal trio

- Origin: Paris, France
- Genres: Euro disco, pop
- Years active: 1977–1979
- Past members: Evelyne Lenton; Giusy Fortes; Marzia Thear

Belle Epoque (also referenced in some sources as La Belle Epoque; French for "(the) beautiful past") was the name of a female vocal trio, based in Paris, France. The group first rose to popularity during the late 1970s with a disco remake of the song "Black Is Black", originally a hit in 1966 for the Spanish group Los Bravos.

== History ==
Belle Epoque consisted of lead singer Evelyne Lenton (born Evelyne Verrecchia), a French singer who began recording and performing in the early 1960s under the name Evy, and two back-up singers. Originally, the back-up singers were Jusy Fortes (also known as Judy Lisboa), originating from Cape Verde, and Marcia Briscoe (also known as Marcia Briscue), hailing from Atlanta, Georgia. However, over time, as Lenton notes, "The girls kept changing with the circumstances."

The trio scored a major European hit in 1977 with their disco remake of "Black Is Black". The Belle Epoque version was a top ten hit in many European countries, including number 2 in the UK Singles Chart (the same chart position that Los Bravos' original had reached there 11 years earlier). The song also became a number 1 hit in Australia in 1978.

In the US, Belle Epoque are better known for another song, "Miss Broadway", which charted at number 26 on the U.S. R&B chart and at number 92 on the Billboard Hot 100 in 1978. "Miss Broadway" and "Black Is Black" both rose to number 21 on Billboard's "National Disco Action Top 40" chart in summer 1977.

Other hits in continental Europe followed into the late 1970s. Lenton began recording solo again in 1983, although she has worked with contemporary music producers to craft remixes of "Black Is Black" and "Miss Broadway".

Evelyne Lenton died on 22 April 2026, at the age of 80.

== Name ==
In UK sources, such as David Roberts' British Hit Singles & Albums, the band is listed by the name "La Belle Epoque". In US sources, such as Joel Whitburn's Hot Dance/Disco 1974–2003 and Top Pop Singles 1955–2002, the group is listed as "Belle Epoque". Evelyne Lenton's official website lists the band's name as "Belle Epoque". "Belle Epoque" is also the name listed for the group on its first US album, Miss Broadway, released in 1977 on Big Tree Records (BT 76008). But the cover of their "Black Is Black" single (extended version) is shown as "La Belle Epoque". A reproduction of this cover can be seen online at YouTube.

== Discography ==
=== Albums ===
- Miss Broadway (1977)
- Bamalama (1978)
- Now (1979)

=== Singles ===
Year	Title	Peak chart positions											Certifications
Year	Title	AUS	AUT	BEL (FL)	CAN	GER	IRE	NL 100	NOR	SWI	UK	US	Certifications
1977	"Black Is Black"	1	3	4	—	2	3	7	7	6	2	—	BPI: Gold
1977	"Miss Broadway"	—	13	15	—	8	—	11	—	—	—	92	
1978	"Bamalama"	—	—	26	8	38	—	—	—	—	—	—	
1978	"Let Men Be"	—	—	—	—	—	—	—	—	—	—	—	
1978	"Com' On Tonight" / "Stranger Once Again"	—	—	—	—	—	—	—	—	—	—		
1979	"Now" (Germany-only release)	—	—	—	—	—	—	—	—	—	—	—	
1979	"Jump Down"	—	—	—	—	—	—	—	—	—	—	—	
"—" denotes releases that did not chart or were not released in that territory.
