= 2025 Italian Figure Skating Championships =

Figure skating competition

- Type: National championship
- Date: 19 – 21 December 2024
- Season: 2024–25
- Location: Varese
- Host: Federazione Italiana Sport del Ghiaccio
- Venue: Acinque Ice Arena

Champions
- Men's singles: Daniel Grassl (Senior)
- Women's singles: Anna Pezzetta (Senior)
- Pairs: Sara Conti and Niccolò Macii (Senior) & Irina Napolitano and Edoardo Comi (Junior)
- Ice dance: Charlène Guignard and Marco Fabbri (Senior) & Noemi Maria Tali and Noah Lafornara (Junior)
- Previous: 2024 Italian Championships
- Next: 2026 Italian Championships

The 2025 Italian Figure Skating Championships (Italian: Campionati Italiani Assoluti 2025 Pattinaggio Di Figura Su Ghiaccio) were held from 19–21 December 2024, at the Acinque Ice Arena in Varese. Medals were awarded in men's singles, women's singles, pair skating, and ice dance at the senior level, and pair skating and ice dance at the junior level. The results were part of the selection criteria for the 2025 European Championships, 2025 World Championships, and 2025 World Junior Championships.

== Medal summary ==
=== Senior ===
Discipline	Gold	Silver	Bronze
Men	Daniel Grassl	Nikolaj Memola	Gabriele Frangipani
Women	Anna Pezzetta	Lara Naki Gutmann	Marina Piredda
Pairs	Sara Conti; Niccolò Macii	Rebecca Ghilardi; Filippo Ambrosini	Irma Caldara; Riccardo Maglio
Ice dance	Charlène Guignard; Marco Fabbri	Victoria Manni; Carlo Röthlisberger	Leia Dozzi; Pietro Papetti

=== Junior ===
Discipline	Gold	Silver	Bronze
Pairs	Irina Napolitano; Edoardo Comi	Polina Polman; Gabriel Renoldi	Melissa Merrone; Alberto Tommasi
Ice dance	Noemi Maria Tali; Noah Lafornara	Laura Finelli; Massimiliano Bucciarelli	Vittoria Petracchi; Daniel Basile

== Senior results ==
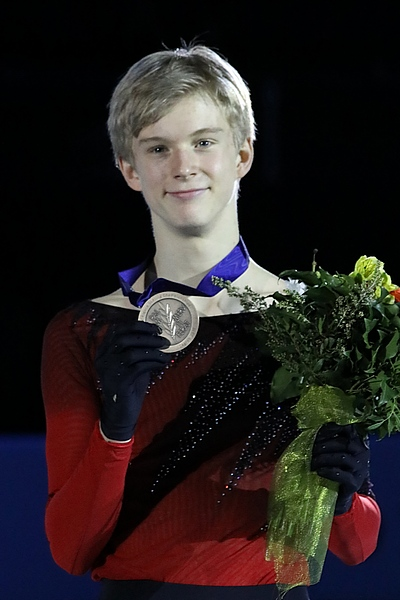
Daniel Grassl, the 2025 Italian champion in men's singles

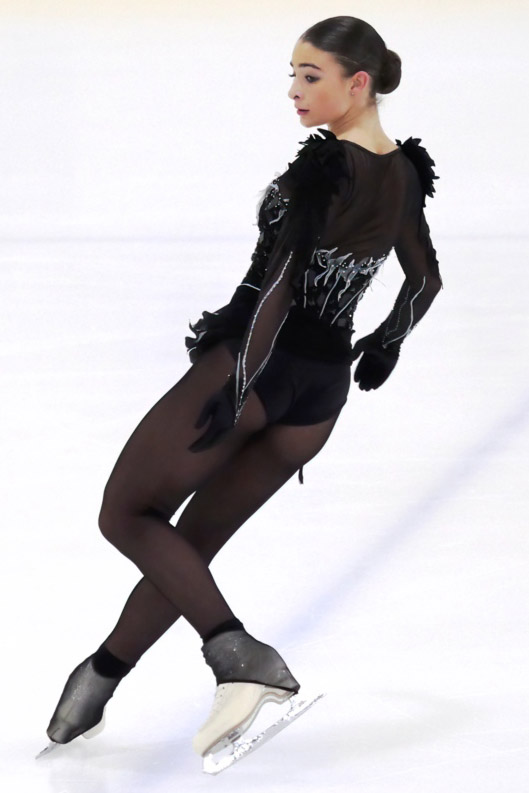
Anna Pezzetta, the 2025 Italian champion in women's singles

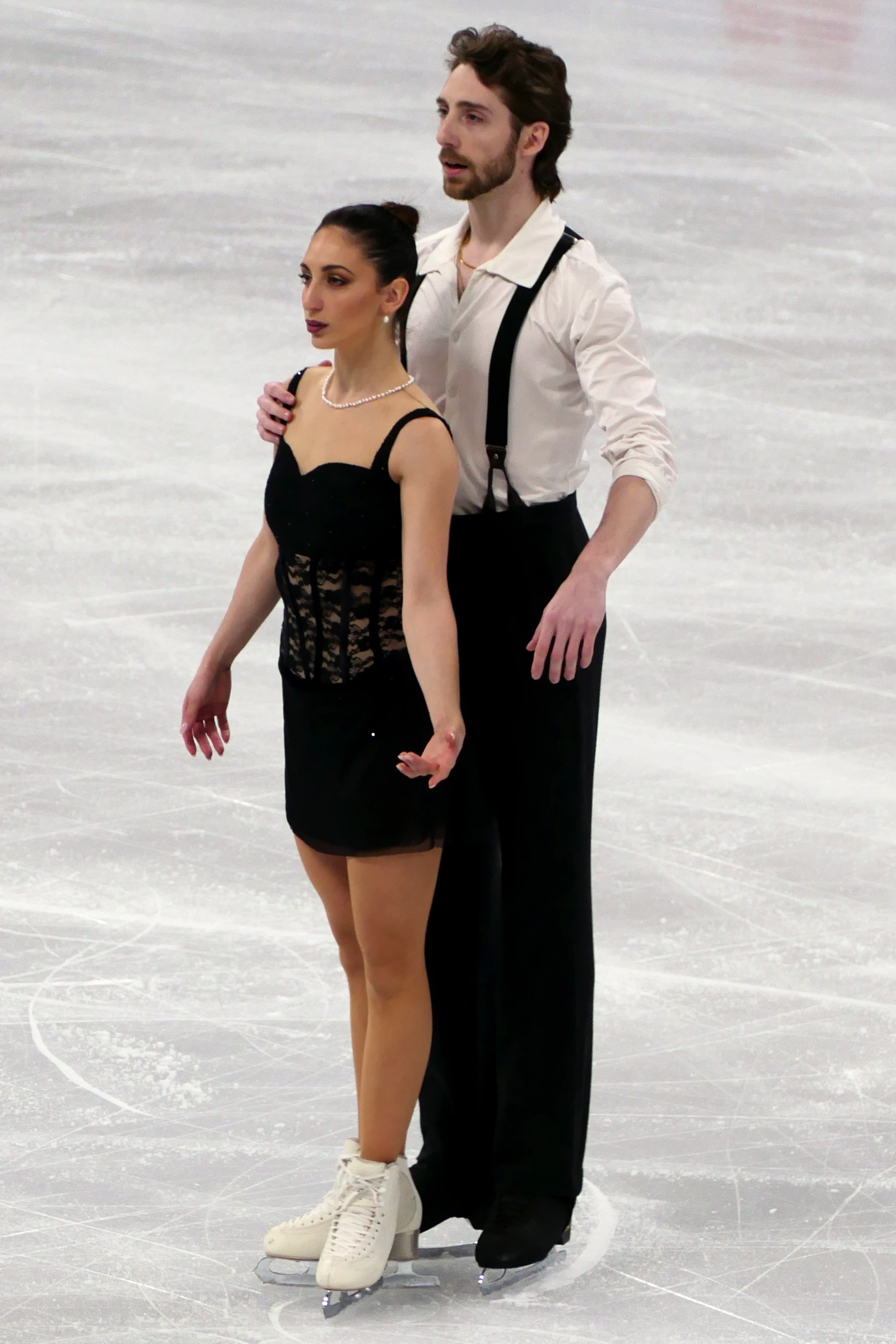
Sara Conti and Niccolò Macii, the 2025 Italian champions in pair skating

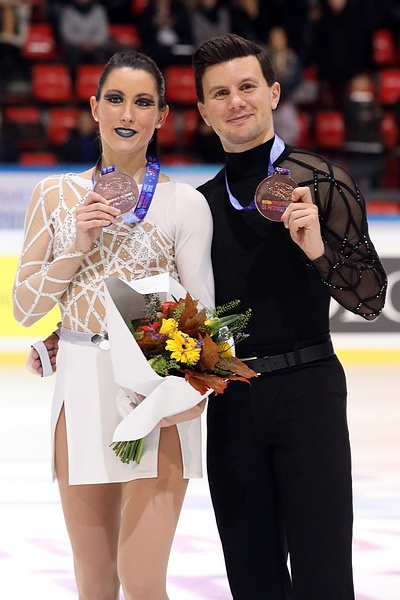
Charlène Guignard and Marco Fabbri, the 2025 Italian champions in ice dance

=== Men's singles ===
Men's results
Rank	Skater	Total points	SP		FS	
1st place, gold medalist(s)	Daniel Grassl	272.29	1	101.25	2	171.04
2nd place, silver medalist(s)	Nikolaj Memola	264.54	3	86.32	1	178.22
3rd place, bronze medalist(s)	Gabriele Frangipani	243.75	4	82.70	3	161.05
4	Matteo Rizzo	230.22	2	87.46	4	142.76
5	Corey Circelli	200.98	5	73.82	5	127.16
6	Raffaele Francesco Zich	193.94	6	73.62	6	120.32
7	Matteo Nalbone	172.64	7	56.38	7	116.26

=== Women's singles ===
Women's results
Rank	Skater	Total points	SP		FS	
1st place, gold medalist(s)	Anna Pezzetta	194.83	2	60.37	1	134.46
2nd place, silver medalist(s)	Lara Naki Gutmann	180.92	1	63.29	2	117.63
3rd place, bronze medalist(s)	Marina Piredda	169.88	4	56.63	3	113.25
4	Ginevra Lavinia Negrello	167.87	3	58.20	5	109.67
5	Amanda Ghezzo	161.25	6	51.09	4	110.16
6	Chiara Minighini	143.14	5	55.52	8	87.62
7	Carlotta Maria Gardini	142.20	8	45.83	6	96.37
8	Elena Agostinelli	136.86	9	43.78	7	93.08
9	Giulia Barucchi	133.03	7	45.95	9	87.08

=== Pairs ===
Pairs' results
Rank	Team	Total points	SP		FS	
1st place, gold medalist(s)	Sara Conti; Niccolò Macii	221.36	1	76.11	1	145.25
2nd place, silver medalist(s)	Rebecca Ghilardi; Filippo Ambrosini	188.21	2	70.31	2	117.90
3rd place, bronze medalist(s)	Irma Caldara; Riccardo Maglio	159.46	3	59.93	3	99.53

=== Ice dance ===
Ice dance results
Rank	Team	Total points	RD		FD	
1st place, gold medalist(s)	Charlène Guignard; Marco Fabbri	226.72	1	91.39	1	135.33
2nd place, silver medalist(s)	Victoria Manni; Carlo Röthlisberger	180.32	3	71.75	2	108.57
3rd place, bronze medalist(s)	Leia Francesca Dozzi; Pietro Papetti	178.64	2	71.92	3	106.72
4	Giulia Paolino; Andrea Tuba	175.85	4	70.60	4	105.25
5	Carlotta Argentieri; Francesco Riva	150.95	5	62.92	5	88.03
6	Anna Bodrone; Stefano Frasca	143.56	6	58.95	6	84.61

== Junior results ==
=== Pairs ===
Pairs' results
Rank	Team	Total points	SP		FS	
1st place, gold medalist(s)	Irina Napolitano; Edoardo Comi	139.93	2	47.90	1	92.03
2nd place, silver medalist(s)	Polina Polman; Gabriel Renoldi	137.57	1	49.34	2	88.23
3rd place, bronze medalist(s)	Melissa Merrone; Alberto Tommasi	103.25	3	39.68	4	63.57
4	Elisabetta Profaizer; Matteo Libasse Mandelli	99.86	4	33.51	3	66.35

=== Ice dance ===
Ice dance results
Rank	Team	Total points	RD		FD	
1st place, gold medalist(s)	Noemi Maria Tali; Noah Lafornara	183.55	1	74.57	1	108.98
2nd place, silver medalist(s)	Laura Finelli; Massimiliano Bucciarelli	151.07	2	63.30	2	87.77
3rd place, bronze medalist(s)	Vittoria Petracchi; Daniel Basile	145.03	3	57.27	3	87.76
4	Arianna Soldati; Nicholas Tagliabue	132.84	4	48.55	4	84.29
5	Zoe Bianchi; Pietro Rota	125.86	6	47.61	5	78.25
6	Martina Lavazza; Raphael Meunier	118.85	5	48.48	6	70.37
7	Alessia Rocci; Davide Pettigiani	98.43	7	37.10	7	61.33
8	Irene Barreri; Alessando di Giogio	90.38	8	36.68	8	53.70
