= 2024 Italian Figure Skating Championships =

Figure skating competition

- Type: National championship
- Date: December 22 – 23, 2023
- Season: 2023–24
- Location: Pinerolo
- Host: Federazione Italiana Sport del Ghiaccio
- Venue: Stadio Olimpico Pinerolo

Champions
- Men's singles: Nikolaj Memola (Senior) & Matteo Nalbone (Junior)
- Women's singles: Sarina Joos (Senior) & Noemi Joos (Junior)
- Pairs: Rebecca Ghilardi and Filippo Ambrosini (Senior) & Irina Napolitano and Edoardo Comi (Junior)
- Ice dance: Charlène Guignard and Marco Fabbri (Senior) & Noemi Maria Tali and Noah Lafornara (Junior)
- Previous: 2023 Italian Championships
- Next: 2025 Italian Championships

The 2024 Italian Figure Skating Championships (Italian: Campionati Italiani Assoluti 2025 Pattinaggio Di Figura Su Ghiaccio) were held from December 12–23, 2023, at the Stadio Olimpico Pinerolo in Pinerolo. Medals were awarded in men's singles, women's singles, pair skating, and ice dance at the senior level, and ice dance at the junior level. The results were part of the selection criteria for the 2024 European Championships, 2024 World Championships, and 2024 World Junior Championships.

The 2024 Italian Junior Championships were held later from February 3–4, 2024, in Varese. Medals were awarded in men's singles, women's singles, and pair skating at the junior level.

== Medal summary ==
=== Senior level ===
Discipline	Gold	Silver	Bronze
Men	Nikolaj Memola	Gabriele Frangipani	Corey Circelli
Women	Sarina Joos	Lara Naki Gutmann	Anna Pezzetta
Pairs	Rebecca Ghilardi; Filippo Ambrosini	Lucrezia Beccari; Matteo Guarise	Anna Valesi; Manuel Piazza
Ice dance	Charlène Guignard; Marco Fabbri	Victoria Manni; Carlo Röthlisberger	Leia Francesca Dozzi; Pietro Papetti

=== Junior ===
Discipline	Gold	Silver	Bronze
Men	Matteo Nalbone	Nikolay Di Tria	Edoardo Profaizer
Women	Noemi Joos	Giulia Barucchi	Annalisa Ursino
Pairs	Irina Napolitano; Edoardo Comi	Polina Polman; Gabriel Renoldi	—N/a
Ice dance	Noemi Maria Tali; Noah Lafornara	Beatrice Ventura; Stefano Frasca	Vittoria Petracchi; Daniel Basile

== Senior results ==
=== Men's singles ===
Men's results
Rank	Skater	Total points	SP		FS	
1st place, gold medalist(s)	Nikolaj Memola	248.68	2	90.70	1	157.98
2nd place, silver medalist(s)	Gabriele Frangipani	239.78	1	91.04	2	148.74
3rd place, bronze medalist(s)	Corey Circelli	214.00	3	72.98	3	214.00
4	Raffaele Francesco Zich	195.60	4	67.39	4	128.21

=== Women's singles ===
Women's results
Rank	Skater	Total points	SP		FS	
1st place, gold medalist(s)	Sarina Joos	192.79	2	65.27	2	127.04
2nd place, silver medalist(s)	Lara Naki Gutmann	183.88	7	53.84	1	130.04
3rd place, bronze medalist(s)	Anna Pezzetta	181.59	1	66.42	4	115.17
4	Marina Piredda	181.53	3	63.09	3	118.44
5	Ginevra Lavinia Negrello	170.38	6	55.42	5	114.96
6	Chiara Minighini	163.57	4	57.73	6	105.84
7	Amanda Ghezzo	154.70	5	56.14	7	98.56
8	Irina Napolitano	150.53	8	52.77	8	97.76

=== Pairs ===
Pairs' results
Rank	Team	Total points	SP		FS	
1st place, gold medalist(s)	Rebecca Ghilardi; Filippo Ambrosini	192.88	2	66.69	1	126.19
2nd place, silver medalist(s)	Lucrezia Beccari; Matteo Guarise	191.13	1	70.09	2	121.04
3rd place, bronze medalist(s)	Anna Valesi; Manuel Piazza	157.72	3	57.66	3	100.06
4	Irma Caldara; Riccardo Maglio	154.85	4	55.23	4	99.62

=== Ice dance ===
Ice dance results
Rank	Team	Total points	RD		FD	
1st place, gold medalist(s)	Charlène Guignard; Marco Fabbri	229.98	1	91.59	1	138.39
2nd place, silver medalist(s)	Victoria Manni; Carlo Röthlisberger	177.75	2	70.45	2	107.30
3rd place, bronze medalist(s)	Leia Francesca Dozzi; Pietro Papetti	165.78	3	61.05	3	104.73
4	Lavinia Casteller; Vladislav Kasinskii	152.33	4	59.33	4	93.00
5	Giorgia Galimberti; Matteo Mandelli	150.69	5	58.65	5	92.04

== Junior results ==
=== Men's singles ===
Men's results
Rank	Skater	Total points	SP		FS	
1st place, gold medalist(s)	Matteo Nalbone	160.42	1	62.69	1	97.73
2nd place, silver medalist(s)	Nikolay di Tria	142.93	2	50.31	2	92.62
3rd place, bronze medalist(s)	Edoardo Luigi Profaizer	131.74	3	47.34	3	84.40
4	Tommaso Barison	122.59	4	42.97	4	79.62
5	Nikita Dossena	120.12	5	42.29	5	77.83
6	Matteo Marchioni	116.79	6	39.08	6	77.71
7	Giorgio Basile	110.89	7	37.32	7	73.57

=== Women's singles ===
Women's results
Rank	Skater	Total points	SP		FS	
1st place, gold medalist(s)	Noemi Joos	166.57	1	57.30	1	109.27
2nd place, silver medalist(s)	Giulia Barucchi	148.85	5	46.16	2	102.69
3rd place, bronze medalist(s)	Annalisa Ursino	127.57	6	45.88	5	81.69
4	Letizia Martegani	127.43	7	45.62	4	81.81
5	Gioia Fiori	127.29	3	47.11	7	80.18
6	Rina Taniguchi	126.67	4	46.83	8	79.84
7	Carlotta Maria Gardini	124.13	2	50.58	14	73.55
8	Sofia Gaddo	123.13	12	41.82	6	81.31
9	Siqi Liu	121.95	15	39.47	3	82.48
10	Anita Gemelli	120.15	8	45.00	11	75.85
11	Anita Mapelli	120.15	9	44.30	12	75.85
12	Matilde Petracchi	119.24	10	44.06	13	75.18
13	Beatrice Soldati	117.81	14	41.25	9	76.56
14	Eleonora Ciferri	114.80	16	38.85	10	75.95
15	Micol Panepucci	112.61	11	42.70	17	69.91
16	Linda Lezuo	112.14	13	41.73	16	70.41
17	Melissa Merrone	109.04	17	37.70	15	71.34
18	Elisabetta Profaizer	104.98	20	36.22	18	68.76
19	Matilda Malgarise	103.65	18	37.36	19	66.29
20	Francesca Serafini	95.80	19	37.29	20	58.51
21	Greta Viskare	86.99	21	33.62	21	53.37

=== Pairs ===
Pairs' results
Rank	Team	Total points	SP		FS	
1st place, gold medalist(s)	Irina Napolitano; Edoardo Comi	138.93	1	48.33	1	90.60
2nd place, silver medalist(s)	Polina Polman; Gabriel Renoldi	113.51	2	41.17	2	72.34

=== Ice dance ===
Ice dance results
Rank	Team	Total points	RD		FD	
1st place, gold medalist(s)	Noemi Maria Tali; Noah Lafornara	157.72	1	59.17	1	98.55
2nd place, silver medalist(s)	Beatrice Ventura; Stefano Frasca	140.13	2	56.31	3	83.82
3rd place, bronze medalist(s)	Vittoria Petracchi; Daniel Basile	137.54	4	53.55	2	83.99
4	Alice Pizzorni; Massimiliano Bucciarelli	137.37	3	54.86	4	82.51
5	Arianna Soldati; Nicholas Tagliabue	128.43	5	48.77	5	79.66
6	Irene Barreri; Alessando di Giogio	99.64	6	37.44	6	62.20
7	Martina Lavazza; Raphael Meunier	91.85	7	37.26	7	54.59
8	Alessia Rocci; Davide Pettigiani	83.90	8	31.32	8	52.58
