= 2025 CS Nebelhorn Trophy =

Figure skating competition in Germany

- Type: ISU Challenger Series
- Date: 25 – 27 September
- Season: 2025–26
- Location: Oberstdorf, Germany
- Host: German Ice Skating Union
- Venue: Eissportzentrum Oberstdorf

Champions
- Men's singles: (Canada) Stephen Gogolev
- Women's singles: (United States) Amber Glenn
- Pairs: (Germany) Minerva Fabienne Hase & Nikita Volodin
- Ice dance: (United Kingdom) Lilah Fear & Lewis Gibson
- Previous: 2024 CS Nebelhorn Trophy
- Next: 2026 CS Nebelhorn Trophy
- Previous CS: 2025 CS Lombardia Trophy
- Next CS: 2025 CS Nepela Memorial

The 2025 Nebelhorn Trophy was a figure skating competition sanctioned by the International Skating Union (ISU), organized and hosted by the Deutsche Eislauf Union, and the fifth event of the 2025–26 ISU Challenger Series. It was held at the Eissportzentrum Oberstdorf in Oberstdorf, Germany, from 25 to 27 September 2025. Medals were awarded in men's singles, women's singles, pair skating, and ice dance, and skaters earned ISU World Standing points based on their results. Stephen Gogolev of Canada won the men's event, Amber Glenn of the United States won the women's event, Minerva Fabienne Hase and Nikita Volodin of Germany won the pairs event, and Lilah Fear and Lewis Gibson of Great Britain won the ice dance event.

== Background ==
The ISU Challenger Series was introduced in 2014. It is a series of international figure skating competitions sanctioned by the International Skating Union (ISU) and organized by ISU member nations. The objective was to ensure consistent organization and structure within a series of international competitions linked together, providing opportunities for senior-level skaters to compete at the international level and also earn ISU World Standing points. The 2025–26 Challenger Series consists of eleven events, of which the Nebelhorn Trophy was the fifth.

== Changes to preliminary assignments ==
The International Skating Union published the preliminary list of entrants on 26 August 2025.

Date	Discipline	Withdrew	Added	Ref.
2 September	Pairs	(United States); Ellie Kam; Danny O'Shea	(United States); Olivia Flores; Luke Wang	
5 September	Pairs	(United States); Olivia Flores; Luke Wang	—N/a	
14 September	Men	(Latvia); Deniss Vasiļjevs	—N/a	
18 September	Women	—N/a	(Finland); Iida Karhunen	
18 September	Ice dance	(Czech Republic); Kateřina Mrázková; Daniel Mrázek	—N/a	
18 September	Ice dance	(Italy); Leia Dozzi; Pietro Papetti	—N/a	
18 September	Ice dance	(Italy); Giulia Isabella Paolino; Andrea Tuba	—N/a	
24 September	Ice dance	(United States); Emily Bratti; Ian Somerville	—N/a	
24 September	Ice dance	(France); Laurence Fournier Beaudry; Guillaume Cizeron	—N/a	

== Required performance elements ==
=== Single skating ===
Men and women competing in single skating first performed their short programs on Thursday, 25 September. Lasting no more than 2 minutes 40 seconds, the short program had to include the following elements:

For men: one double or triple Axel; one triple or quadruple jump; one jump combination consisting of a double jump and a triple jump, two triple jumps, or a quadruple jump and a double jump or triple jump; one flying spin; one camel spin or sit spin with a change of foot; one spin combination with a change of foot; and a step sequence using the full ice surface.

For women: one double or triple Axel; one triple jump; one jump combination consisting of a double jump and a triple jump, or two triple jumps; one flying spin; one layback spin, sideways leaning spin, camel spin, or sit spin without a change of foot; one spin combination with a change of foot; and one step sequence using the full ice surface.

Women performed their free skates on Saturday, 27 September, while men performed theirs on Friday, 26 September. The free skate performance for both men and women could last no more than 4 minutes, and had to include the following: seven jump elements, of which one had to be an Axel-type jump; three spins, of which one had to be a spin combination, one had to be a flying spin, and one had to be a spin with only one position; a step sequence; and a choreographic sequence.

=== Pairs ===
Couples competing in pair skating first performed their short programs on Thursday, 25 September. Lasting no more than 2 minutes 40 seconds, the short program had to include the following elements: one pair lift, one double or triple twist lift, one double or triple throw jump, one double or triple solo jump, one solo spin combination with a change of foot, one death spiral, and a step sequence using the full ice surface.

Couples performed their free skates on Friday, 26 September. The free skate performance could last no more than 4 minutes, and had to include the following: three pair lifts, of which one has to be a twist lift; two different throw jumps; one solo jump; one jump combination or sequence; one pair spin combination; one death spiral; and a choreographic sequence.

=== Ice dance ===
Couples competing in ice dance performed their rhythm dances on Friday, 26 September. Lasting no more than 2 minutes 50 seconds, the theme of the rhythm dance this season was "music, dance styles, and feeling of the 1990s". Examples of applicable dance styles and music included, but were not limited to: pop, Latin, house, techno, hip-hop, and grunge. The rhythm dance had to include the following elements: one pattern dance step sequence, one choreographic rhythm sequence, one dance lift, one set of sequential twizzles, and one step sequence.

Couples then performed their free dances on Saturday, 27 September. The free dance performance could last no longer than 4 minutes, and had to include the following: three dance lifts, one dance spin, one set of synchronized twizzles, one step sequence in hold, one step sequence while on one skate and not touching, and three choreographic elements.

== Judging ==
Skaters were judged according to the required technical elements of their program (such as jumps and spins), as well as the overall presentation of their program, based on three program components (skating skills, presentation, and composition). Each technical element in a figure skating performance was assigned a predetermined base point value and scored by a panel of nine judges on a scale from −5 to +5 based on the quality of its execution. Each Grade of Execution (GOE) from –5 to +5 was assigned a value as indicated on the Scale of Values. For example, a triple Axel was worth a base value of 8.00 points, and a GOE of +3 was worth 2.40 points, so a triple Axel with a GOE of +3 earned 10.40 points. The judging panel's GOE for each element was determined by calculating the trimmed mean (the average after discarding the highest and lowest scores). The panel's scores for all elements were added together to generate a Total Elements Score. At the same time, the judges evaluated each performance based on the five aforementioned program components and assigned each a score from 0.25 to 10 in 0.25-point increments. The judging panel's final score for each program component was also determined by calculating the trimmed mean. Those scores were then multiplied by the factor shown on the chart below; the results were added together to generate a total Program Component Score.

Program component factoring
Discipline	Short program or Rhythm dance	Free skate or Free dance
Men	1.67	3.33
Women	1.33	2.67
Pairs	1.33	2.67
Ice dance	1.33	2.00

Deductions were applied for certain violations, such as time infractions, stops and restarts, or falls. The Total Elements Score and Program Component Score were then added together, minus any deductions, to generate a final performance score for each skater or team.

== Medal summary ==
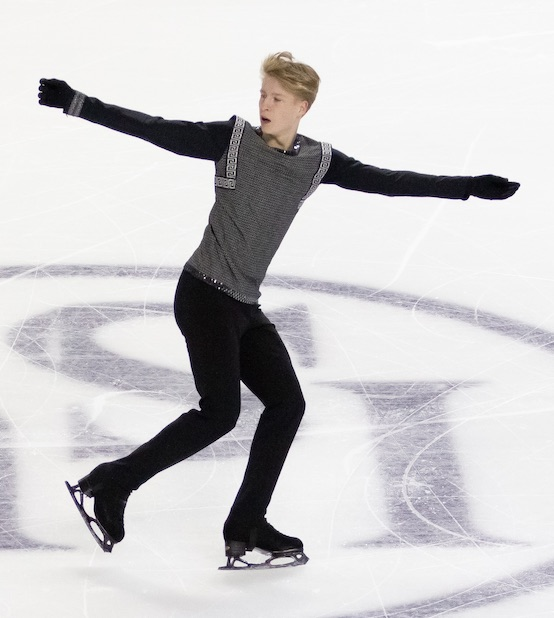
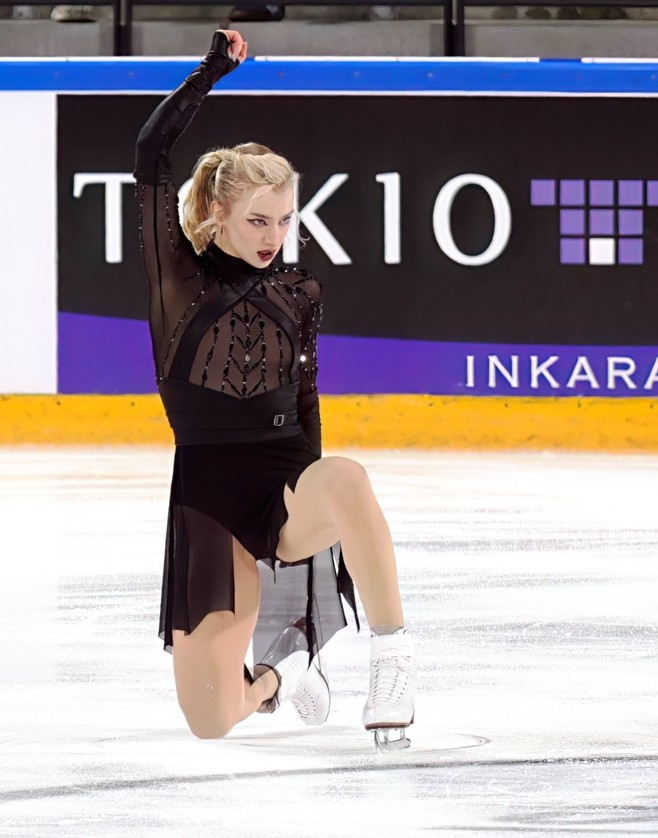
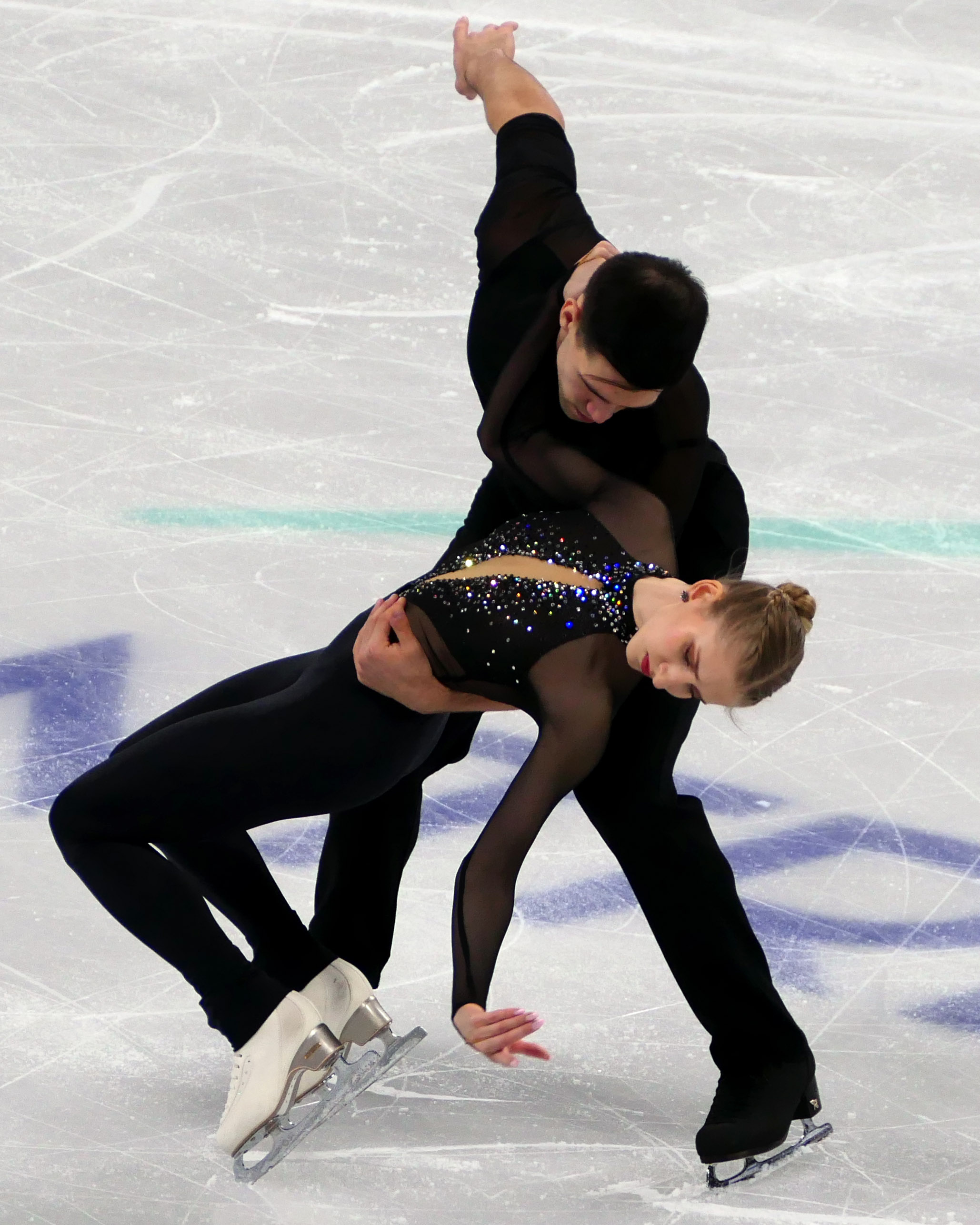
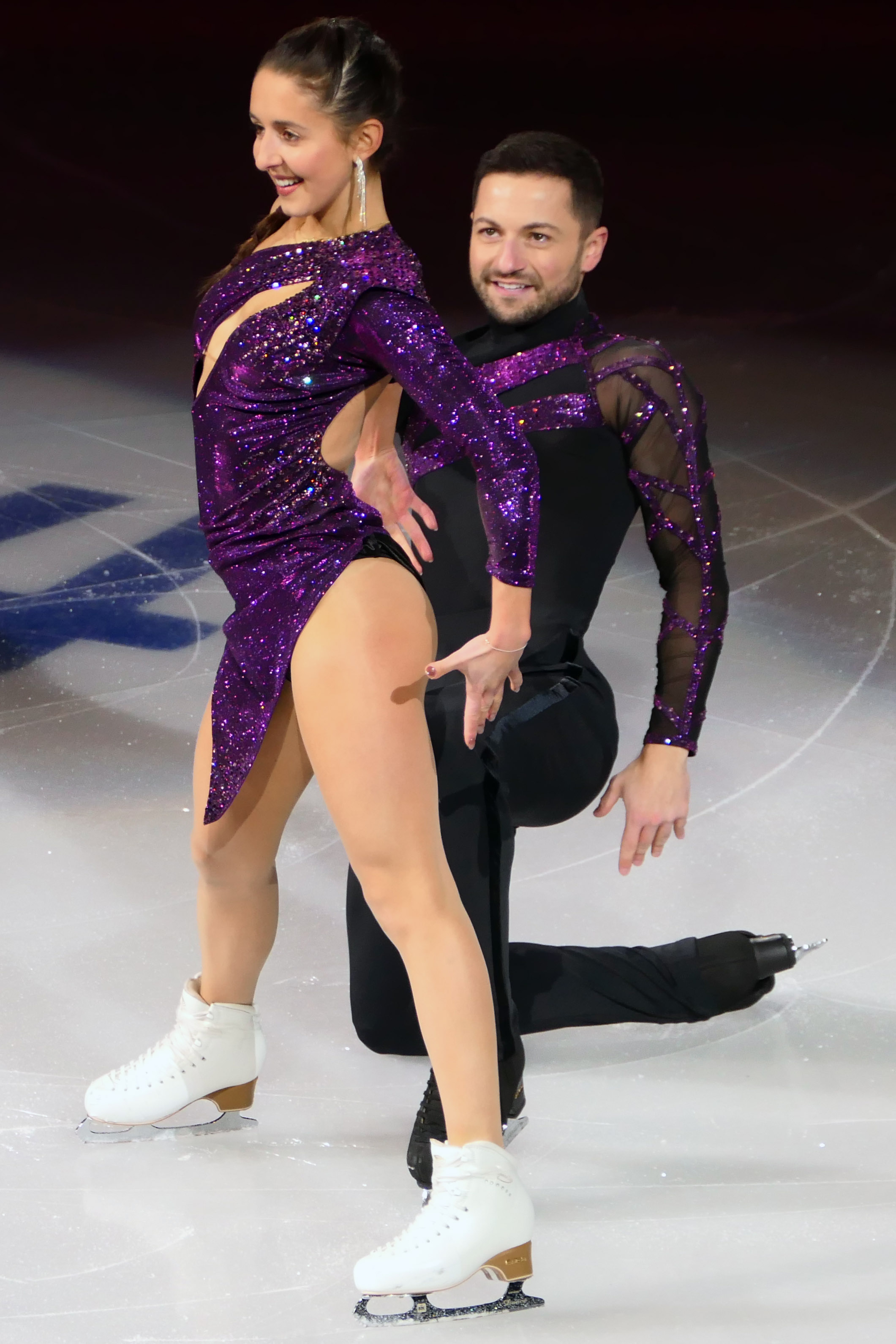
The 2025 Nebelhorn Trophy champions: Stephen Gogolev of Canada (men's singles); Amber Glenn of the United States (women's singles); Minerva Fabienne Hase and Nikita Volodin of Germany (pair skating); and Lilah Fear and Lewis Gibson of Great Britain (ice dance)

Medalists
Discipline	Gold	Silver	Bronze
Men	(Canada) Stephen Gogolev	(United States) Andrew Torgashev	(Switzerland) Lukas Britschgi
Women	(United States) Amber Glenn	(Japan) Mone Chiba	(South Korea) Shin Ji-a
Pairs	(Germany); Minerva Fabienne Hase; Nikita Volodin	(Japan); Riku Miura; Ryuichi Kihara	(United States); Alisa Efimova; Misha Mitrofanov
Ice dance	(United Kingdom); Lilah Fear; Lewis Gibson	(United States); Christina Carreira; Anthony Ponomarenko	(Canada); Marie-Jade Lauriault; Romain Le Gac

== Results ==
=== Men's singles ===
Men's results
Rank	Skater	Nation	Total points	SP		FS	
1st place, gold medalist(s)	Stephen Gogolev	Canada	255.06	1	90.19	1	164.87
2nd place, silver medalist(s)	Andrew Torgashev	United States	239.54	2	87.35	4	152.19
3rd place, bronze medalist(s)	Lukas Britschgi	Switzerland	236.06	4	84.16	5	151.90
4	Kazuki Tomono	Japan	234.59	3	86.43	6	148.16
5	Roman Sadovsky	Canada	233.39	5	78.44	2	154.95
6	Liam Kapeikis	United States	227.45	6	73.91	3	153.54
7	Lee Jae-keun	South Korea	219.99	7	73.02	7	146.97
8	Tatsuya Tsuboi	Japan	209.01	12	63.35	8	145.66
9	Gabriele Frangipani	Italy	198.37	10	63.76	9	134.61
10	Landry Le May	France	193.63	8	65.97	10	127.66
11	Kornel Witkowski	Poland	190.78	9	64.59	11	126.19
12	Arthur Mai	Germany	179.47	13	61.61	13	117.86
13	Kai Jagoda	Germany	179.22	11	63.50	15	115.72
14	Filip Šcerba	Czech Republic	176.93	14	61.03	14	115.90
15	Lim Ju-heon	South Korea	171.55	15	53.41	12	118.14
16	Luca Fünfer	Germany	159.09	16	52.62	16	106.47
17	Lucas Fitterer	Great Britain	153.24	18	50.54	17	102.70
18	Iker Oyarzabal	Spain	148.36	19	45.68	18	102.68
19	Ken Fitterer	Great Britain	137.10	17	52.55	19	84.55

=== Women's singles ===
Amber Glenn of the United States finished second in both the short program and the free skate, but won the gold medal. Shin Ji-a of South Korea had been in first place after the short program, but finished fourth in the free skate; while Mone Chiba of Japan, who had been in fourth place after the short program, finished first in the free skate. This wild swap in placements allowed Glenn to ultimately win the competition.

Women's results
Rank	Skater	Nation	Total points	SP		FS	
1st place, gold medalist(s)	Amber Glenn	United States	214.49	2	73.69	2	140.80
2nd place, silver medalist(s)	Mone Chiba	Japan	213.64	4	69.24	1	144.40
3rd place, bronze medalist(s)	Shin Ji-a	South Korea	208.45	1	74.47	4	133.98
4	Isabeau Levito	United States	207.21	3	71.10	3	136.11
5	Kaiya Ruiter	Canada	178.44	5	64.46	6	113.98
6	Iida Karhunen	Finland	174.01	8	54.50	5	119.51
7	Léa Serna	France	168.58	6	63.88	7	104.70
8	Hana Yoshida	Japan	155.84	11	51.78	8	104.06
9	Olga Mikutina	Austria	151.91	10	53.13	9	98.78
10	Katherine Medland Spence	Canada	151.57	9	54.16	10	97.41
11	Julia Sauter	Romania	144.71	7	54.75	11	89.96
12	Linnea Kilsand	Norway	124.80	12	46.13	14	78.67
13	Selma Välitalo	Finland	122.69	15	41.93	13	80.76
14	Nela Šnebergerová	Czech Republic	122.66	16	38.91	12	83.75
15	Anna Grekul	Germany	117.11	14	42.87	15	74.24
16	Oona Ounasvuori	Finland	99.45	17	34.79	16	64.66
WD	Livia Kaiser	Switzerland	Withdrew	13	43.82	Withdrew from competition	

=== Pairs ===
Pairs results
Rank	Skater	Nation	Total points	SP		FS	
1st place, gold medalist(s)	Minerva Fabienne Hase; Nikita Volodin	Germany	221.38	2	77.61	1	143.77
2nd place, silver medalist(s)	Riku Miura; Ryuichi Kihara	Japan	221.03	1	78.19	2	142.84
3rd place, bronze medalist(s)	Alisa Efimova; Misha Mitrofanov	United States	193.79	3	67.42	3	126.37
4	Rebecca Ghilardi; Filippo Ambrosini	Italy	193.03	4	66.82	4	126.21
5	Katie McBeath; Daniil Parkman	United States	183.81	6	64.24	6	119.57
6	Lia Pereira; Trennt Michaud	Canada	183.57	11	60.35	5	123.22
7	Lucrezia Beccari; Matteo Guarise	Italy	181.22	7	62.96	7	118.26
8	Annika Hocke; Robert Kunkel	Germany	180.04	10	62.11	8	117.93
9	Oxana Vouillamoz; Tom Bouvart	Switzerland	179.80	5	65.85	9	113.95
10	Gabriella Izzo; Luc Maierhofer	Austria	171.24	9	62.13	10	109.11
11	Anastasia Vaipan-Law; Luke Digby	Great Britain	165.02	12	60.05	11	104.97
12	Daria Danilova; Michel Tsiba	Netherlands	159.53	8	62.69	13	96.84
13	Ioulia Chtchetinina; Michał Woźniak	Poland	158.38	13	57.01	12	101.37
14	Letizia Roscher; Luis Schuster	Germany	142.50	15	53.35	15	89.15
15	Aurélie Faula; Théo Belle	France	139.48	16	46.12	14	93.36
16	Irma Caldara; Riccardo Maglio	Italy	131.85	14	54.68	17	77.17
17	Megan Wessenberg; Denys Strekalin	France	127.89	17	44.32	16	83.57

=== Ice dance ===
Ice dance results
Rank	Team	Nation	Total points	RD		FD	
1st place, gold medalist(s)	Lilah Fear; Lewis Gibson	Great Britain	201.51	1	78.87	1	122.64
2nd place, silver medalist(s)	Christina Carreira; Anthony Ponomarenko	United States	192.35	2	76.11	2	116.24
3rd place, bronze medalist(s)	Marie-Jade Lauriault; Romain Le Gac	Canada	180.17	4	71.73	3	111.19
4	Jennifer Janse van Rensburg; Benjamin Steffan	Germany	180.05	3	68.98	4	108.32
5	Marie Dupayage; Thomas Nabais	France	161.94	5	62.91	5	99.03
6	Lily Hensen; Nathan Lickers	Canada	154.24	6	58.22	6	96.02
7	Karla Maria Karl; Kai Hoferichter	Germany	150.73	7	56.16	7	94.57
8	Lila Schubert; Nikita Remeshevskiy	Germany	136.60	8	53.65	8	82.95
9	Laura Finelli; Massimiliano Bucciarelli	Italy	124.39	9	47.43	9	76.96
10	Louise Bordet; Martin Chardain	France	110.16	11	46.57	10	63.59
WD	Lara Luft; Ilias Fourati	Hungary	Withdrew	10	47.18	Withdrew from competition	

== Works cited ==
- "Special Regulations & Technical Rules – Single & Pair Skating and Ice Dance 2024" (PDF). International Skating Union. Archived (PDF) from the original on 3 June 2025.
