= Riccardo Maglio =

Italian pair skater (born 1999)

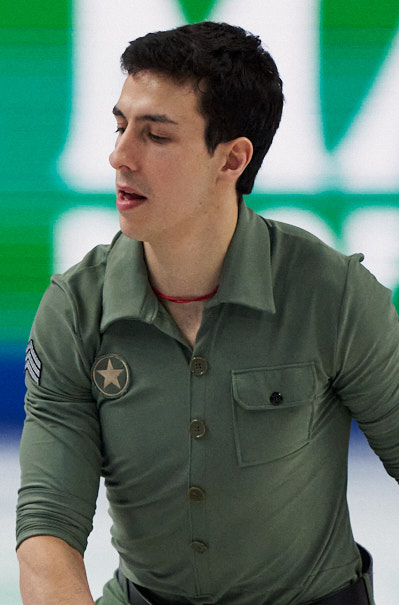
- Maglio at the 2026 World Championships

Personal information
- Full name: Riccardo Maria Maglio
- Born: 24 April 1999 (age 27) Milan, Italy
- Home town: Opera, Italy
- Height: 1.81 m (5 ft 11 1/2 in)

Figure skating career
- Country: Italy
- Discipline: Pair skating
- Partner: Irma Caldara (since 2021); Giulia Papa (2017–21)
- Coach: Cristiana Di Natale; Fabiana Di Natale; Lorenzo Marchei
- Skating club: CUS Torino
- Began skating: 2007

Medal record
Italian Championships
Bronze medal – third place	2025 Varese	Pairs
Bronze medal – third place	2026 Begamo	Pairs

Riccardo Maria Maglio (born 24 April 1999) is an Italian pair skater. With his skating partner, Irma Caldara, he is a two-time Italian national bronze medalist (2025-26) and has won six senior international medals, including gold at the 2022 Bavarian Open, 2022 Trophée Métropole Nice Côte d'Azur, and the 2025 Merano Ice Trophy.

== Career ==
=== Early years ===
Maglio began learning to skate in 2007.

He skated four seasons with Giulia Papa. The two made their international debut in February 2018, appearing in junior pairs at the Ice Mall Cup. Their other international appearances were also as juniors.

Papa/Maglio moved up to seniors for their fourth and final season as a pair but did not compete internationally. They finished fourth at the Italian Championships in December 2020.

=== 2021–22 season: Debut of Caldara/Maglio ===
Maglio began competing in partnership with Irma Caldara. The two placed tenth at their first international event, the Lombardia Trophy in September 2021, and fourteenth at the 2021 CS Golden Spin of Zagreb in December. In January, they took bronze at the Icelab International Cup before winning the Bavarian Open.

=== 2022–23 season: Grand Prix debut ===
Caldara and Maglio won silver at the Lombardia Trophy in September and gold at the Trophée Métropole Nice Côte d'Azur in October. They finished in fifth place at the 2022 MK John Wilson Trophy. Caldara and Maglio then finished fourth at the 2022 NHK Trophy.

=== 2023–24 season ===
Beginning the season at the 2023 CS Nebelhorn Trophy, Caldara and Maglio finished tenth. They were eighth at the 2023 Finlandia Trophy. Invited to one Grand Prix event, they finished in sixth place at the 2023 Skate America.

Following a fourth-place finish at the 2024 Italian Championships, Caldara/Maglio closed the season by placing fifth at the 2024 Bavarian Open.

=== 2024–25 season: European Championships debut ===
Caldara/Maglio opened the season by finishing seventh at the 2024 CS Lombardia Trophy, winning bronze at the 2024 Diamond Spin, and placing eighth at the 2024 CS Warsaw Cup. In December, at the 2025 Italian Championships, the pair won the bronze medal.

Selected to compete at the 2025 European Championships in Tallinn, Estonia, Caldara/Maglio finished the event in fifteenth place. They then closed the season by winning gold at the 2025 Merano Ice Trophy.

=== 2025–26 season: World Championships debut ===
Caldara/Maglio started the season by finishing fifth at the 2025 Lombardia Trophy. They then followed this up by finishing sixteenth at the 2025 CS Nebelhorn Trophy and winning silver at the 2025 Swiss Open.

In November, they withdrew following the short program at the 2025 Cup of Innsbruck. The following month, Caldara/Maglio finished sixth at the 2025 CS Golden Spin of Zagreb and won the bronze medal at the 2026 Italian Championships. The pair were subsequently selected to compete at the 2026 European Championships following the withdrawal of Beccari/Guarise, finishing the event in thirteenth place overall.

== Programs ==
=== With Caldara ===
Season	Short program	Free skating	Exhibition
2025–2026	La donna cannone by Francesco De Gregori choreo. by Andrea Vaturi	Jake Enters His Avatar World (from Avatar) by James Horner; The Songcord (from Avatar: The Way of Water) by Simon Franglen; Adiemus by Karl Jenkins; I See You (from Avatar) performed by Leona Lewis choreo. by Andrea Vaturi	
2024–2025	La donna cannone by Francesco De Gregori choreo. by Andrea Vaturi	Iris by Goo Goo Dolls choreo. by Andrea Vaturi	
2023–2024	Brotsjor by Ólafur Arnalds; Iron by Woodkid choreo. by Federica Bernardi, David Cipolleschi	The Batman; Cat Woman; The Batman by Michael Giacchino choreo. by Andrea Vaturi, David Cipolleschi	
2022–2023	Brotsjor by Ólafur Arnalds; Iron by Woodkid choreo. by Federica Bernardi, David Cipolleschi	Don't Be So Serious by Low Roar; BB's Theme (from Death Stranding) by Jenny Plant choreo. by Federica Bernardi	Ovunque Sarai by Irama
2021–2022	Maria and the Violin's String by Ashram choreo. by Federica Bernardi	Don't Be So Serious by Low Roar; BB's Theme (from Death Stranding) by Jenny Plant choreo. by Federica Bernardi	

== Competitive highlights ==
- GP – Event of the ISU Grand Prix Series
- CS – Event of the ISU Challenger Series
- TBD – Assigned
- WD – Withdrew from competition

=== Pair skating with Irma Caldara ===
Competition placements at senior level
Season	2021–22	2022–23	2023–24	2024–25	2025–26	2026–27
World Championships					20th	
European Championships				15th	13th	
Italian Championships	5th	4th	4th	3rd	3rd	
GP NHK Trophy		4th				
GP Skate America			6th			
GP Wilson Trophy		5th				
GP Skate Canada						8th
CS Golden Spin of Zagreb	14th				6th	
CS Lombardia Trophy	10th	2nd		7th		
CS Nebelhorn Trophy			10th		16th	9th
CS Warsaw Cup				8th		
CS Finlandia Trophy			8th			
Challenge Cup		4th				
Cup of Innsbruck					WD	
Diamond Spin				3rd		
IceLab Cup	3rd					
Lombardia Trophy					5th	
Trophée Métropole Nice		1st				
Merano Ice Trophy				1st		
Bavarian Open	1st		5th			

=== Pair skating with Giulia Papa ===
Competition placements at junior level
Season	2017–18	2018–19	2019–20	2020–21
Italian Championships (Senior)				4th
Italian Championships (Junior)		5th	3rd	
Bavarian Open			7th	
Egna Spring Trophy		3rd		
Golden Spin of Zagreb			4th	
IceLab Cup			4th	
Open Ice Mall Cup	1st	1st		

== Detailed results ==
=== Pair skating with Irma Caldara ===
ISU personal best scores in the +5/-5 GOE System
Segment	Type	Score	Event
Total	TSS	168.25	2025 CS Golden Spin of Zagreb
Short program	TSS	61.20	2025 CS Golden Spin of Zagreb
Short program	TES	34.40	2025 CS Golden Spin of Zagreb
Short program	PCS	26.80	2025 CS Golden Spin of Zagreb
Free skating	TSS	107.05	2025 CS Golden Spin of Zagreb
Free skating	TES	54.76	2022 MK John Wilson Trophy
Free skating	PCS	54.88	2025 CS Golden Spin of Zagreb

Results in the 2021–22 season
Date	Event	SP		FS		Total	
Date	Event	P	Score	P	Score	P	Score
Sep 10–12, 2021	(Italy) 2021 CS Lombardia Trophy	9	43.24	10	73.87	10	117.11
Dec 4–5, 2021	(Italy) 2022 Italian Championships	5	44.96	5	79.30	5	124.26
Dec 8–11, 2021	(Croatia) 2021 CS Golden Spin of Zagreb	14	51.18	13	96.11	14	147.29
Jan 13–14, 2022	(Italy) 2022 IceLab International Cup	2	51.83	3	87.72	3	139.55
Jan 18–23, 2022	(Germany) 2022 Bavarian Open	2	51.30	1	96.17	1	147.47

Results in the 2022–23 season
Date	Event	SP		FS		Total	
Date	Event	P	Score	P	Score	P	Score
Sep 15–18, 2022	(Italy) 2022 CS Lombardia Trophy	2	56.10	3	98.98	2	155.08
Oct 18–23, 2022	(France) 2022 Trophée Métropole Nice Côte d'Azur	1	59.52	2	92.75	1	152.27
Nov 11–13, 2022	(United Kingdom) 2022 MK John Wilson Trophy	6	55.70	5	104,53	5	160.23
Nov 18–20, 2022	(Japan) 2022 NHK Trophy	4	58.95	5	105.28	4	164.23
Dec 15–18, 2022	(Italy) 2023 Italian Championships	4	56.17	4	99.77	4	155.94
Feb 23–26, 2023	(Netherlands) 2023 International Challenge Cup	2	60.68	4	103.36	4	164.04

Results in the 2023–24 season
Date	Event	SP		FS		Total	
Date	Event	P	Score	P	Score	P	Score
Sep 20–23, 2023	(Germany) 2023 CS Nebelhorn Trophy	9	47.78	12	91.37	10	139.15
Oct 4–8, 2023	(Finland) 2023 CS Finlandia Trophy	9	48.14	8	88.65	8	136.79
Oct 20–22, 2023	(United States) 2023 Skate America	5	52.22	6	85.96	6	138.18
Dec 22–23, 2023	(Italy) 2024 Italian Championships	4	55.23	4	99.62	4	154.85
Jan 30 – Feb 4, 2024	(Germany) 2024 Bavarian Open	4	51.53	6	87.82	5	139.35

Results in the 2024–25 season
Date	Event	SP		FS		Total	
Date	Event	P	Score	P	Score	P	Score
Sep 13–15, 2024	(Italy) 2024 CS Lombardia Trophy	6	52.73	9	85.41	7	138.14
Oct 15–20, 2024	(Poland) 2024 Diamond Spin	3	56.89	4	95.88	3	152.77
Nov 20–24, 2024	(Poland) 2024 CS Warsaw Cup	9	48.97	10	88.45	8	137.42
Dec 19–21, 2024	(Italy) 2025 Italian Championships	3	59.93	3	99.53	3	159.46
Jan 28 – Feb 2, 2025	(Estonia) 2025 European Championships	14	53.75	15	96.78	15	150.53
Feb 13–16, 2025	(Italy) 2025 Merano Ice Trophy	2	58.32	2	107.51	1	165.83

Results in the 2025–26 season
Date	Event	SP		FS		Total	
Date	Event	P	Score	P	Score	P	Score
Sep 11–14, 2025	(Italy) 2025 Lombardia Trophy	4	58.47	9	90.24	5	145.11
Sep 25–27, 2025	(Germany) 2025 CS Nebelhorn Trophy	14	54.68	17	77.17	16	131.85
Nov 13–16, 2025	(Austria) 2025 Cup of Innsbruck	3	59.01	—N/a	—N/a	WD	—N/a
Dec 3–6, 2025	(Croatia) 2025 CS Golden Spin of Zagreb	3	61.20	6	107.05	6	168.25
Dec 17–20, 2025	(Italy) 2026 Italian Championships	3	55.08	3	105.65	3	160.73
Jan 13–18, 2026	(United Kingdom) 2026 European Championships	14	53.29	14	100.33	13	153.62
Mar 24–29, 2026	(Czech Republic) 2026 World Championships	18	58.79	19	102.16	20	160.95

Results in the 2026–27 season
Date	Event	SP		FS		Total	
Date	Event	P	Score	P	Score	P	Score
Sep 24–26, 2026	(Germany) 2026 CS Nebelhorn Trophy	7	55.22	7	96.19	9	151.41
Oct 30 - Nov 1, 2026	2026 Skate Canada International	7	58.10	8	88.47	8	146.57
