= Irma Caldara =

Italian pair skater (born 2000)

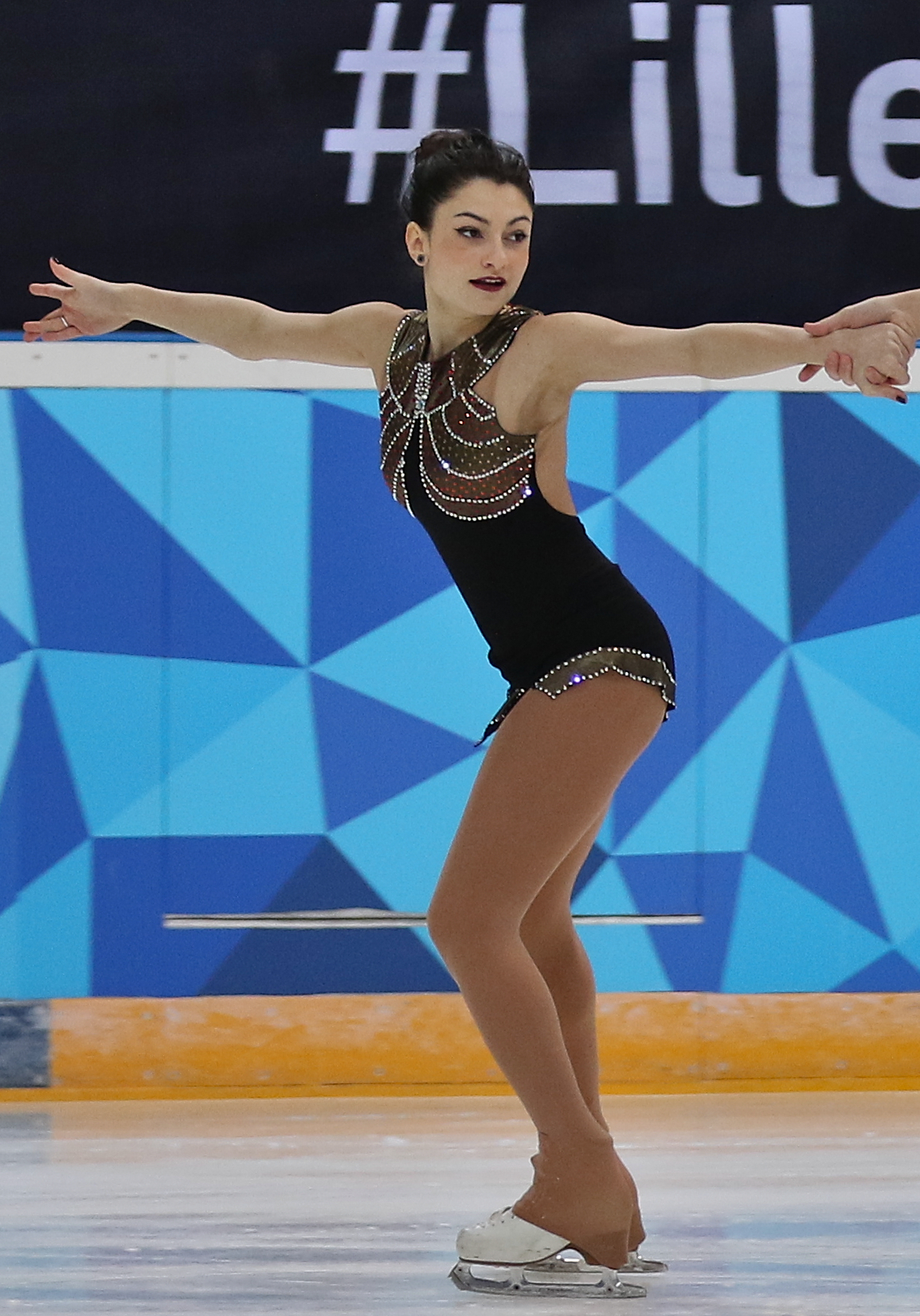
- Caldara at the 2016 Winter Youth Olympics

Personal information
- Full name: Irma Angela Sofia Caldara
- Born: 4 July 2000 (age 26) Milan, Italy
- Height: 1.61 m (5 ft 3 1/2 in)

Figure skating career
- Country: Italy
- Discipline: Pair skating
- Partner: Riccardo Maglio (since 2021); Marco Santucci (2018–21); Edoardo Caputo (2014–18)
- Coach: Cristiana Di Natale; Fabiana Di Natale; Lorenzo Marchei
- Skating club: CUS Torino
- Began skating: 2006

Medal record
Italian Championships
Bronze medal – third place	2025 Varese	Pairs
Bronze medal – third place	2026 Begamo	Pairs

Irma Angela Sofia Caldara (born 4 July 2000) is an Italian pair skater. With her skating partner, Riccardo Maglio, she is a two-time Italian national bronze medalist (2025-26) and has won six senior international medals, including gold at the 2022 Bavarian Open, 2022 Trophée Métropole Nice Côte d'Azur, and the 2025 Merano Ice Trophy.

== Career ==
=== Early years ===
Caldara began learning to skate in 2006.

By 2014, she had teamed up with Edoardo Caputo to compete in junior pairs. Making their international debut, Caldara/Caputo took silver at the Lombardia Trophy in September 2014.

=== 2015–16 season: Youth Olympics ===
In September 2015, Caldara/Caputo competed at two 2015–16 ISU Junior Grand Prix (JGP) events, placing tenth at both. In February, they finished ninth in the pairs' event at the 2016 Winter Youth Olympics in Hamar, Norway. They were sixth in the team event, skating as members of Team Courage.

=== 2016–17 season ===
Caldara/Caputo took silver at the Lombardia Trophy, placed 15th at their JGP event in Germany, and then won silver at the NRW Trophy. In March 2017, the pair placed 15th at the 2017 World Junior Championships in Taipei.

=== 2017–18 season ===
Caldara/Caputo placed ninth at their JGP assignment in Belarus, then took gold at the Volvo Open Cup, held in November in Latvia. The latter was their final competition as a pair. They were coached by Tiziana Pagani in Milan.

=== 2018–19 through 2020–21: Partnership with Santucci ===
Caldara skated the next three seasons with Marco Santucci in senior pairs. The two made their international debut in February 2019, placing sixth at the Open Ice Mall Cup in Israel.

The following season, Caldara/Santucci skated at two Challenger Series events, placing 20th at both, and then finished fourth at the Italian Championships. In February 2020, they placed tenth at the Bavarian Open.

In their third and final season together, they made no international appearances. In December 2020, they withdrew from the Italian Championships after placing fourth in the short program.

=== 2021–22 season: Debut of Caldara/Maglio ===
Caldara began competing in partnership with Riccardo Maglio. The two placed tenth at their first international event, the Lombardia Trophy in September 2021, and fourteenth at the 2021 CS Golden Spin of Zagreb in December. In January, they took bronze at the Icelab International Cup before winning the Bavarian Open.

=== 2022–23 season: Grand Prix debut ===
Caldara/Maglio won silver at the Lombardia Trophy in September and gold at the Trophée Métropole Nice Côte d'Azur in October. They were assigned to make their Grand Prix debut and finished in fifth place at the 2022 MK John Wilson Trophy. Caldara/Maglio then finished fourth at the 2022 NHK Trophy, 11.42 points back of bronze medalists McIntosh/Mimar of Canada.

=== 2023–24 season ===
Beginning the season at the 2023 CS Nebelhorn Trophy, Caldara/Maglio came tenth. They were eighth at the 2023 CS Finlandia Trophy. Invited to one Grand Prix event, they finished sixth at the 2023 Skate America.

Following a fourth-place finish at the 2024 Italian Championships, Caldara/Maglio closed the season by placing fifth at the 2024 Bavarian Open.

=== 2024–25 season: European Championships debut ===
Caldara/Maglio opened the season by finishing seventh at the 2024 CS Lombardia Trophy, winning bronze at the 2024 Diamond Spin, and placing eighth at the 2024 CS Warsaw Cup. In December, at the 2025 Italian Championships, the pair won the bronze medal.

Selected to compete at the 2025 European Championships in Tallinn, Estonia, Caldara/Maglio finished the event in fifteenth place. They then closed the season by winning gold at the 2025 Merano Ice Trophy.

=== 2025–26 season: World Championships debut ===
Caldara/Maglio started the season by finishing fifth at the 2025 Lombardia Trophy. They then followed this up by finishing sixteenth at the 2025 CS Nebelhorn Trophy and winning silver at the 2025 Swiss Open.

In November, they withdrew following the short program at the 2025 Cup of Innsbruck. The following month, Caldara/Maglio finished sixth at the 2025 CS Golden Spin of Zagreb and won the bronze medal at the 2026 Italian Championships. The pair were subsequently selected to compete at the 2026 European Championships following the withdrawal of Beccari/Guarise, finishing the event in thirteenth place overall.

== Programs ==
=== Pair skating with Riccardo Maglio ===
Season	Short program	Free skating	Exhibition
2025–2026	La donna cannone by Francesco De Gregori choreo. by Andrea Vaturi	Jake Enters His Avatar World (from Avatar) by James Horner; The Songcord (from Avatar: The Way of Water) by Simon Franglen; Adiemus by Karl Jenkins; I See You (from Avatar) performed by Leona Lewis choreo. by Andrea Vaturi	
2024–2025	La donna cannone by Francesco De Gregori choreo. by Andrea Vaturi	Iris by Goo Goo Dolls choreo. by Andrea Vaturi	
2023–2024	Brotsjor by Ólafur Arnalds; Iron by Woodkid choreo. by Federica Bernardi, David Cipolleschi	The Batman; Cat Woman; The Batman by Michael Giacchino choreo. by Andrea Vaturi, David Cipolleschi	
2022–2023	Brotsjor by Ólafur Arnalds; Iron by Woodkid choreo. by Federica Bernardi, David Cipolleschi	Don't Be So Serious by Low Roar; BB's Theme (from Death Stranding) by Jenny Plant choreo. by Federica Bernardi	Ovunque Sarai by Irama
2021–2022	Maria and the Violin's String by Ashram choreo. by Federica Bernardi	Don't Be So Serious by Low Roar; BB's Theme (from Death Stranding) by Jenny Plant choreo. by Federica Bernardi	

=== Pair skating with Edoardo Caputo ===
Season	Short program	Free skating
2017–2018	La La Land by Justin Hurwitz; Mia and Sebastian's Theme; City of Stars choreo. by Nicoletta Lunghi, Paola Mezzadri	The Addams Family by Marc Shaiman choreo. by Nicoletta Lunghi, Paola Mezzadri
2016–2017	Nostradamus by Maksim Mrvica choreo. by Nicoletta Lunghi, Paola Mezzadri	The Lion King by Hans Zimmer choreo. by Nicoletta Lunghi, Paola Mezzadri
2015–2016	The Lion King by Hans Zimmer choreo. by Nicoletta Lunghi, Raffaella Cazzaniga	Mulan by Matthew Wilder, David Zippel choreo. by Nicoletta Lunghi, Raffaella Cazzaniga

== Competitive highlights ==
- GP – Event of the ISU Grand Prix Series
- JGP – Event of the ISU Junior Grand Prix Series
- CS – Event of the ISU Challenger Series
- TBD – Assigned
- WD – Withdrew from competition

=== Pair skating with Riccardo Maglio ===
Competition placements at senior level
Season	2021–22	2022–23	2023–24	2024–25	2025–26	2026–27
World Championships					20th	
European Championships				15th	13th	
Italian Championships	5th	4th	4th	3rd	3rd	
GP NHK Trophy		4th				
GP Skate America			6th			
GP Wilson Trophy		5th				
GP Skate Canada						8th
CS Golden Spin of Zagreb	14th				6th	
CS Lombardia Trophy	10th	2nd		7th		
CS Nebelhorn Trophy			10th		16th	9th
CS Warsaw Cup				8th		
CS Finlandia Trophy			8th			
Challenge Cup		4th				
Cup of Innsbruck					WD	
Diamond Spin				3rd		
IceLab Cup	3rd					
Lombardia Trophy					5th	
Trophée Métropole Nice		1st				
Merano Ice Trophy				1st		
Bavarian Open	1st		5th			

=== Pair skating with Marco Santucci ===
Competition placements at senior level
Season	2018–19	2019–20	2020–21
Italian Championships		4th	WD
CS Golden Spin of Zagreb		20th	
CS Warsaw Cup		20th	
Bavarian Open		10th	
Egna Spring Trophy	1st		
IceLab Cup		8th	
Open Ice Mall Cup	6th		

=== Pair skating with Edoardo Caputo ===
Competition placements at junior level
Season	2014–15	2015–16	2016–17	2017–18
Winter Youth Olympics		9th		
Winter Youth Olympics (Team event)		6th		
World Junior Championships			15th	
Italian Championships	2nd	1st	1st	
JGP Austria		10th		
JGP Belarus				9th
JGP Germany			15th	
JGP Poland		10th		
Bavarian Open	2nd		6th	
Lombardia Trophy	2nd		2nd	
Mentor Toruń Cup	2nd			
Merano Cup			1st	
NRW Trophy			2nd	
Volvo Open Cup	1st			1st

== Detailed results ==
=== Pair skating with Riccardo Maglio ===
ISU personal best scores in the +5/-5 GOE System
Segment	Type	Score	Event
Total	TSS	168.25	2025 CS Golden Spin of Zagreb
Short program	TSS	61.20	2025 CS Golden Spin of Zagreb
Short program	TES	34.40	2025 CS Golden Spin of Zagreb
Short program	PCS	26.80	2025 CS Golden Spin of Zagreb
Free skating	TSS	107.05	2025 CS Golden Spin of Zagreb
Free skating	TES	54.76	2022 MK John Wilson Trophy
Free skating	PCS	54.88	2025 CS Golden Spin of Zagreb

Results in the 2021–22 season
Date	Event	SP		FS		Total	
Date	Event	P	Score	P	Score	P	Score
Sep 10–12, 2021	(Italy) 2021 CS Lombardia Trophy	9	43.24	10	73.87	10	117.11
Dec 4–5, 2021	(Italy) 2022 Italian Championships	5	44.96	5	79.30	5	124.26
Dec 8–11, 2021	(Croatia) 2021 CS Golden Spin of Zagreb	14	51.18	13	96.11	14	147.29
Jan 13–14, 2022	(Italy) 2022 IceLab International Cup	2	51.83	3	87.72	3	139.55
Jan 18–23, 2022	(Germany) 2022 Bavarian Open	2	51.30	1	96.17	1	147.47

Results in the 2022–23 season
Date	Event	SP		FS		Total	
Date	Event	P	Score	P	Score	P	Score
Sep 15–18, 2022	(Italy) 2022 CS Lombardia Trophy	2	56.10	3	98.98	2	155.08
Oct 18–23, 2022	(France) 2022 Trophée Métropole Nice Côte d'Azur	1	59.52	2	92.75	1	152.27
Nov 11–13, 2022	(United Kingdom) 2022 MK John Wilson Trophy	6	55.70	5	104,53	5	160.23
Nov 18–20, 2022	(Japan) 2022 NHK Trophy	4	58.95	5	105.28	4	164.23
Dec 15–18, 2022	(Italy) 2023 Italian Championships	4	56.17	4	99.77	4	155.94
Feb 23–26, 2023	(Netherlands) 2023 International Challenge Cup	2	60.68	4	103.36	4	164.04

Results in the 2023–24 season
Date	Event	SP		FS		Total	
Date	Event	P	Score	P	Score	P	Score
Sep 20–23, 2023	(Germany) 2023 CS Nebelhorn Trophy	9	47.78	12	91.37	10	139.15
Oct 4–8, 2023	(Finland) 2023 CS Finlandia Trophy	9	48.14	8	88.65	8	136.79
Oct 20–22, 2023	(United States) 2023 Skate America	5	52.22	6	85.96	6	138.18
Dec 22–23, 2023	(Italy) 2024 Italian Championships	4	55.23	4	99.62	4	154.85
Jan 30 – Feb 4, 2024	(Germany) 2024 Bavarian Open	4	51.53	6	87.82	5	139.35

Results in the 2024–25 season
Date	Event	SP		FS		Total	
Date	Event	P	Score	P	Score	P	Score
Sep 13–15, 2024	(Italy) 2024 CS Lombardia Trophy	6	52.73	9	85.41	7	138.14
Oct 15–20, 2024	(Poland) 2024 Diamond Spin	3	56.89	4	95.88	3	152.77
Nov 20–24, 2024	(Poland) 2024 CS Warsaw Cup	9	48.97	10	88.45	8	137.42
Dec 19–21, 2024	(Italy) 2025 Italian Championships	3	59.93	3	99.53	3	159.46
Jan 28 – Feb 2, 2025	(Estonia) 2025 European Championships	14	53.75	15	96.78	15	150.53
Feb 13–16, 2025	(Italy) 2025 Merano Ice Trophy	2	58.32	2	107.51	1	165.83

Results in the 2025–26 season
Date	Event	SP		FS		Total	
Date	Event	P	Score	P	Score	P	Score
Sep 11–14, 2025	(Italy) 2025 Lombardia Trophy	4	58.47	9	90.24	5	145.11
Sep 25–27, 2025	(Germany) 2025 CS Nebelhorn Trophy	14	54.68	17	77.17	16	131.85
Nov 13–16, 2025	(Austria) 2025 Cup of Innsbruck	3	59.01	—N/a	—N/a	WD	—N/a
Dec 3–6, 2025	(Croatia) 2025 CS Golden Spin of Zagreb	3	61.20	6	107.05	6	168.25
Dec 17–20, 2025	(Italy) 2026 Italian Championships	3	55.08	3	105.65	3	160.73
Jan 13–18, 2026	(United Kingdom) 2026 European Championships	14	53.29	14	100.33	13	153.62
Mar 24–29, 2026	(Czech Republic) 2026 World Championships	18	58.79	19	102.16	20	160.95

Results in the 2026–27 season
Date	Event	SP		FS		Total	
Date	Event	P	Score	P	Score	P	Score
Sep 24–26, 2026	(Germany) 2026 CS Nebelhorn Trophy	7	55.22	7	96.19	9	151.41
Oct 30 - Nov 1, 2026	2026 Skate Canada International	7	58.10	8	88.47	8	146.57
