= Merano Ice Trophy =

International figure skating competition

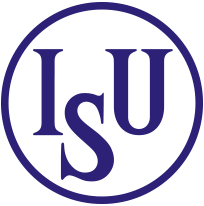
- Location: Italy

The Merano Ice Trophy Memorial Martina Barricelli is an annual international figure skating competition which is generally held in the spring in Merano, Italy. It is named in honor of former figure skater and coach Martina Barricelli, who died in 2021. It is organized by the Italian Ice Sports Federation (Italian: Federazione Italiana Sport del Ghiaccio) and the Associazione Sportiva Merano. Medals may be awarded in men's singles, women's singles, and pairs at the senior, junior, and novice levels.

== Senior medalists ==
=== Men's singles ===
Year	Gold	Silver	Bronze	Ref.
2022	(Italy) Gabriele Frangipani	(Austria) Luc Maierhofer	(Croatia) Jari Kessler	
2024	(Italy) Nikolaj Memola	(Azerbaijan) Vladimir Litvintsev	(Italy) Gabriele Frangipani	
2025	(Spain) Tomàs-Llorenç Guarino Sabaté	(Finland) Valtter Virtanen	(Croatia) Jari Kessler	
2026	(Ukraine) Kyrylo Marsak	(Italy) Corey Circelli	(France) Corentin Spinar	

=== Women's singles ===
Year	Gold	Silver	Bronze	Ref.
2022	(Italy) Ginevra Lavinia Negrello	(Italy) Lucrezia Beccari	(Austria) Sophia Schaller	
2023	(Ukraine) Mariia Andriichuk	(Italy) Alice Orrù	No other competitors	
2024	(France) Léa Serna	(Italy) Lara Naki Gutmann	(Italy) Marina Piredda	
2025	(Austria) Stefanie Pesendorfer	(Germany) Anna Grekul	(Poland) Narietta Atkins	
2026	(Italy) Marina Piredda	(Azerbaijan) Nargiz Süleymanova	(Czech Republic) Barbora Vránková	

=== Pairs ===
Year	Gold	Silver	Bronze	Ref.
2025	(Italy); Irma Caldara; Riccardo Maglio	(Czech Republic); Anna Valesi; Martin Bidar	(Austria); Gabriella Izzo; Luc Maierhofer	

== Junior medalists ==
=== Men's singles ===
Year	Gold	Silver	Bronze	Ref.
2022	(Switzerland) Naoki Rossi	(Switzerland) Georgii Pavlov	(Italy) Daniel Basile	
2023	(Czech Republic) Damian Malczyk	(South Africa) Nicolas van de Vijver	(Italy) Giorgio Basile	
2024	(Slovakia) Lukas Vaclavik	(France) Ilia Gogitidze	(United Kingdom) Arin Yorke	
2025	(Germany) Genrikh Gartung	(Austria) Maksym Petrychenko	(Switzerland) Aurélian Chervet	
2026	(Switzerland) Gion Schmid	(France) Daniel Verbat	(Czech Republic) Tadeáš Václavík	

=== Women's singles ===
Year	Gold	Silver	Bronze	Ref.
2022	(Italy) Anna Pezzetta	(Switzerland) Sarina Joos	(Switzerland) Elina Plüss	
2023	(Italy) Chiara Minighini	(Italy) Siqi Liu	(Malaysia) Katherine Ong Pui Kwan	
2024	(Italy) Chiara Minighini	(Czech Republic) Barbora Tykalová	(Switzerland) Eugenia Sekulovski	
2025	(Italy) Chiara Minighini	(Austria) Hannah Frank	(Switzerland) Savra Bessire	
2026	(Slovakia) Olívia Lengyelová	(Slovakia) Alica Lengyelová	(Italy) Amanda Ghezzo	

=== Pairs ===
Year	Gold	Silver	Bronze	Ref.
2025	(France); Clelia Liget-Latus; Allan Daniel Fisher	No other competitors		
