= 2026 CS Nebelhorn Trophy =

Figure skating competition in Germany

- Type: ISU Challenger Series
- Date: 24 – 26 September
- Season: 2026–27
- Location: Oberstdorf, Germany
- Host: German Ice Skating Union
- Venue: Eissportzentrum Oberstdorf

Champions
- Men's singles: (Estonia) Aleksandr Selevko
- Women's singles: (Norway) Mia Risa Gomez
- Pairs: (Canada) Lia Pereira and Trennt Michaud
- Ice dance: (United States) Christina Carreira and Anthony Ponomarenko
- Previous: 2025 CS Nebelhorn Trophy
- Next: 2027 CS Nebelhorn Trophy
- Previous CS: 2026 CS Lombardia Trophy
- Next CS: 2026 CS Nepela Memorial

The 2026 Nebelhorn Trophy is a figure skating competition sanctioned by the International Skating Union (ISU), organized and hosted by the Deutsche Eislauf Union, and the fifth event of the 2026–27 ISU Challenger Series. It was held at the Eissportzentrum Oberstdorf in Oberstdorf, Germany, from 24 to 26 September 2026. Medals were awarded in men's singles, women's singles, pair skating, and ice dance, and skaters earned ISU World Standing points based on their results. Aleksandr Selevko of Estonia won the men's event, Mia Risa Gomez of Norway won the women's event, Lia Pereira and Trennt Michaud of Canada won the pairs' event, and Christina Carreira and Anthony Ponomarenko of the United States won the ice dance event.

== Background ==
The ISU Challenger Series was introduced in 2014. It is a series of international figure skating competitions sanctioned by the International Skating Union (ISU) and organized by ISU member nations. The objective was to ensure consistent organization and structure within a series of international competitions linked together, providing opportunities for senior-level skaters to compete at the international level and also earn ISU World Standing points. The 2026–27 Challenger Series consists of thirteen events, of which the Nebelhorn Trophy was the fifth.

== Changes to preliminary assignments ==
The International Skating Union published the preliminary list of entrants on 4 September 2026.

Date	Discipline	Withdrew	Ref.
September 8	Pairs	(Hungary); Maria Pavlova; Alexei Sviatchenko	
September 8	Men	(Armenia); Mikayel Salazaryan	
September 18	Pairs	(Germany); Annika Hocke; Robert Kunkel	
September 23	Women	(Republic of Ireland); Sophia Tracey	
September 23	Ice dance	(United Kingdom); Lilah Fear; Lewis Gibson	

== Required performance elements ==
=== Single skating ===
Men and women competing in single skating first perform their short programs on September 24. Lasting no more than 2 minutes 40 seconds, the short program has to include the following elements:

For men: one double or triple Axel; one triple or quadruple jump; one jump combination consisting of a double jump and a triple jump, two triple jumps, or a quadruple jump and a double jump or triple jump; one flying spin; one camel spin or sit spin with a change of foot; one spin combination with a change of foot; and one step sequence using the full ice surface.

For women: one double or triple Axel; one triple jump; one jump combination consisting of a double jump and a triple jump, or two triple jumps; one flying spin; one layback spin, sideways leaning spin, camel spin, or sit spin without a change of foot; one spin combination with a change of foot; and one step sequence using the full ice surface.

Men perform their free skates on September 25, while women perform theirs on September 26. The free skate can last no more than 4 minutes, and has to include the following: six jump elements, of which one has to be an Axel-type jump; three spins, of which one has to be a spin combination, one a flying spin, and one a choreographic spin; one step sequence; and a choreographic sequence.

=== Pair skating ===
Couples competing in pair skating first perform their short programs on September 24. Lasting no more than 2 minutes 40 seconds, the short program has to include the following elements: one pair lift, one double or triple twist lift, one double or triple throw jump, one double or triple solo jump, one pair spin combination, one death spiral, and one step sequence using the full ice surface.

Couples then perform their free skates on September 25. The free skate can last no more than 4 minutes, and has to include the following: two pair lifts, one twist lift, two different throw jumps, one solo jump, one jump combination or sequence, one choreographic pair spin, one choreographic pair lift and one death spiral.

=== Ice dance ===
Couples competing in ice dance first perform their rhythm dances on September 25. Lasting no more than 2 minutes 50 seconds, the theme of the rhythm dance this season is "Rhythm and Waltz". The rhythm dance has to include the following elements: one section of the Golden Waltz pattern dance, one creative dance element, one dance lift, one set of sequential twizzles, and one step sequence while not touching.

Couples then perform their free dances on September 26. The free dance can last no longer than 4 minutes, and has to include the following: three dance lifts or one short lift and one combination lift; one dance spin; one step sequence in hold; one set of synchronized twizzles, one one-foot turns sequence in hold, and two choreographic elements.

== Judging ==
Skaters are judged according to the required technical elements of their program (such as jumps and spins), as well as the overall presentation of their program, based on three program components (skating skills, presentation, and composition). Each technical element in a figure skating performance is assigned a predetermined base point value and scored by a panel of nine judges on a scale from −5 to +5 based on the quality of its execution. Each Grade of Execution (GOE) from –5 to +5 is assigned a value as indicated on the Scale of Values. For example, a triple Axel is worth a base value of 8.00 points, and a GOE of +3 is worth 2.40 points, so a triple Axel with a GOE of +3 earns 10.40 points. The judging panel's GOE for each element is determined by calculating the trimmed mean (the average after discarding the highest and lowest scores). The panel's scores for all elements are added together to generate a Total Elements Score. At the same time, the judges evaluate each performance based on the five aforementioned program components and assign each a score from 0.25 to 10 in 0.25-point increments. The judging panel's final score for each program component is also determined by calculating the trimmed mean. Those scores are then multiplied by the factor shown on the chart below; the results are added together to generate a total Program Component Score.

Program component factoring
Discipline	Short program or rhythm dance	Free skate or free dance
Men	1.67	3.33
Women	1.33	2.67
Pairs	1.33	2.67
Ice dance	1.33	2.00

Deductions are applied for certain violations, such as time infractions, stops and restarts, or falls. The Total Elements Score and Program Component Score are then added together, minus any deductions, to generate a final performance score for each skater or team.

== Medal summary ==
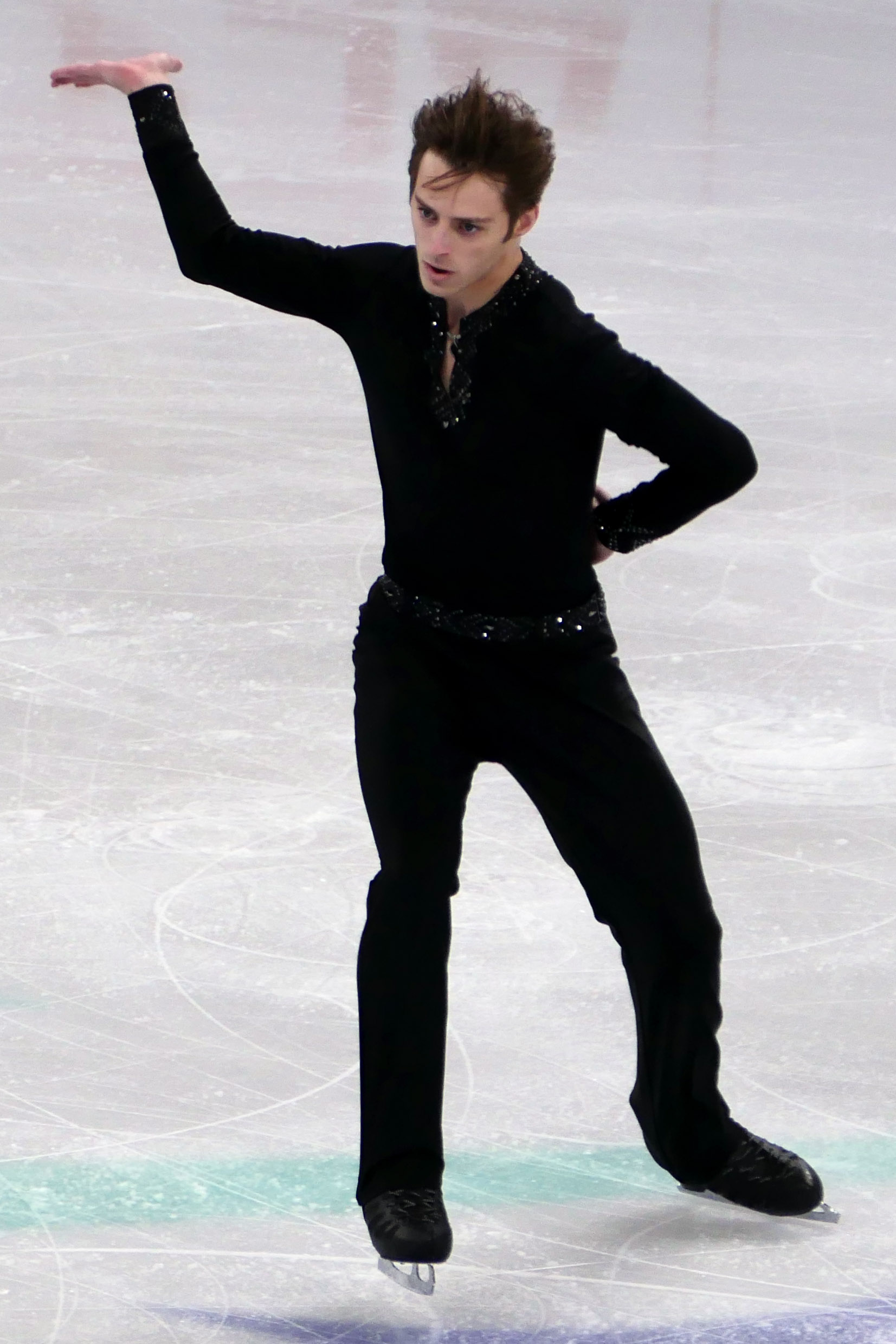
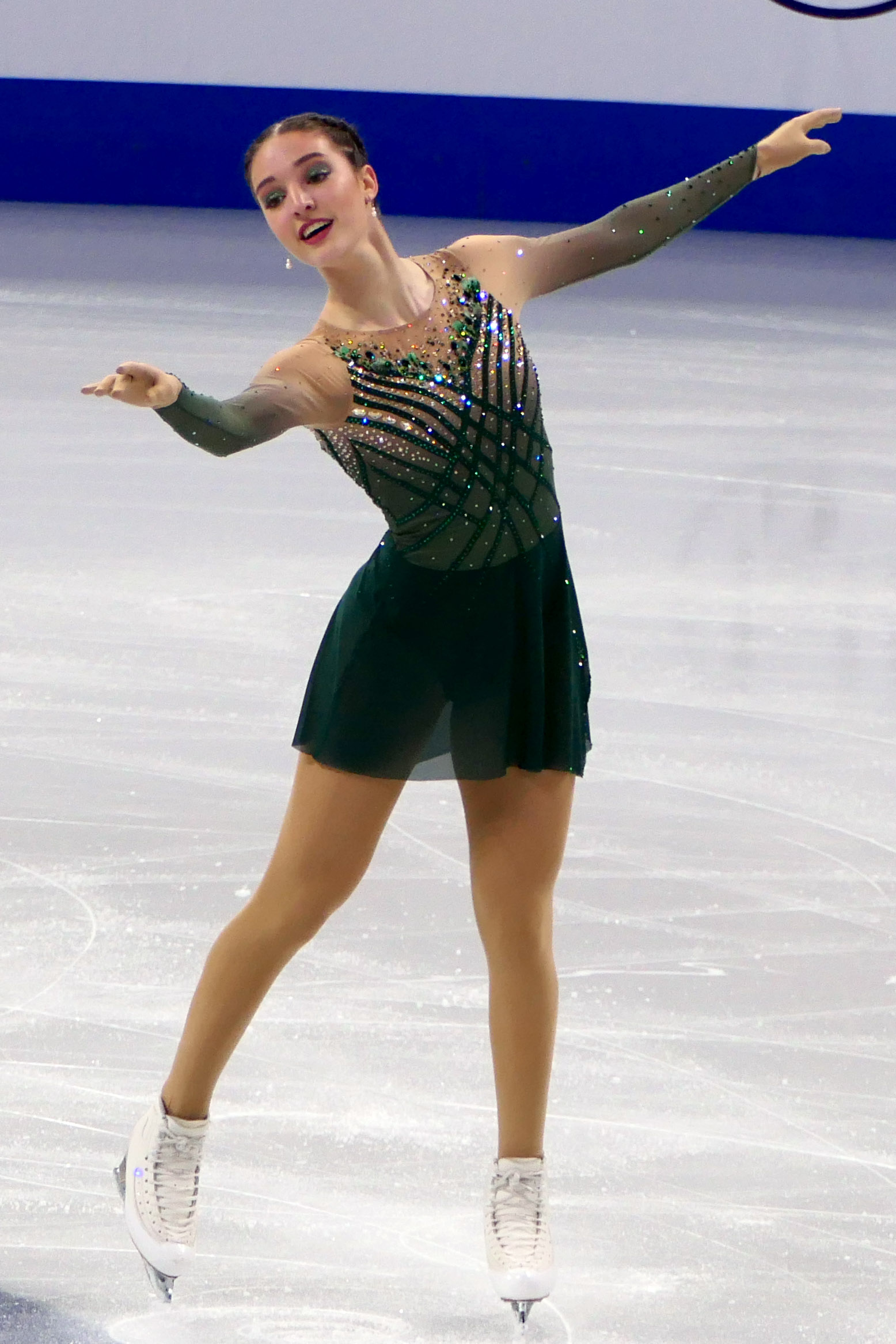
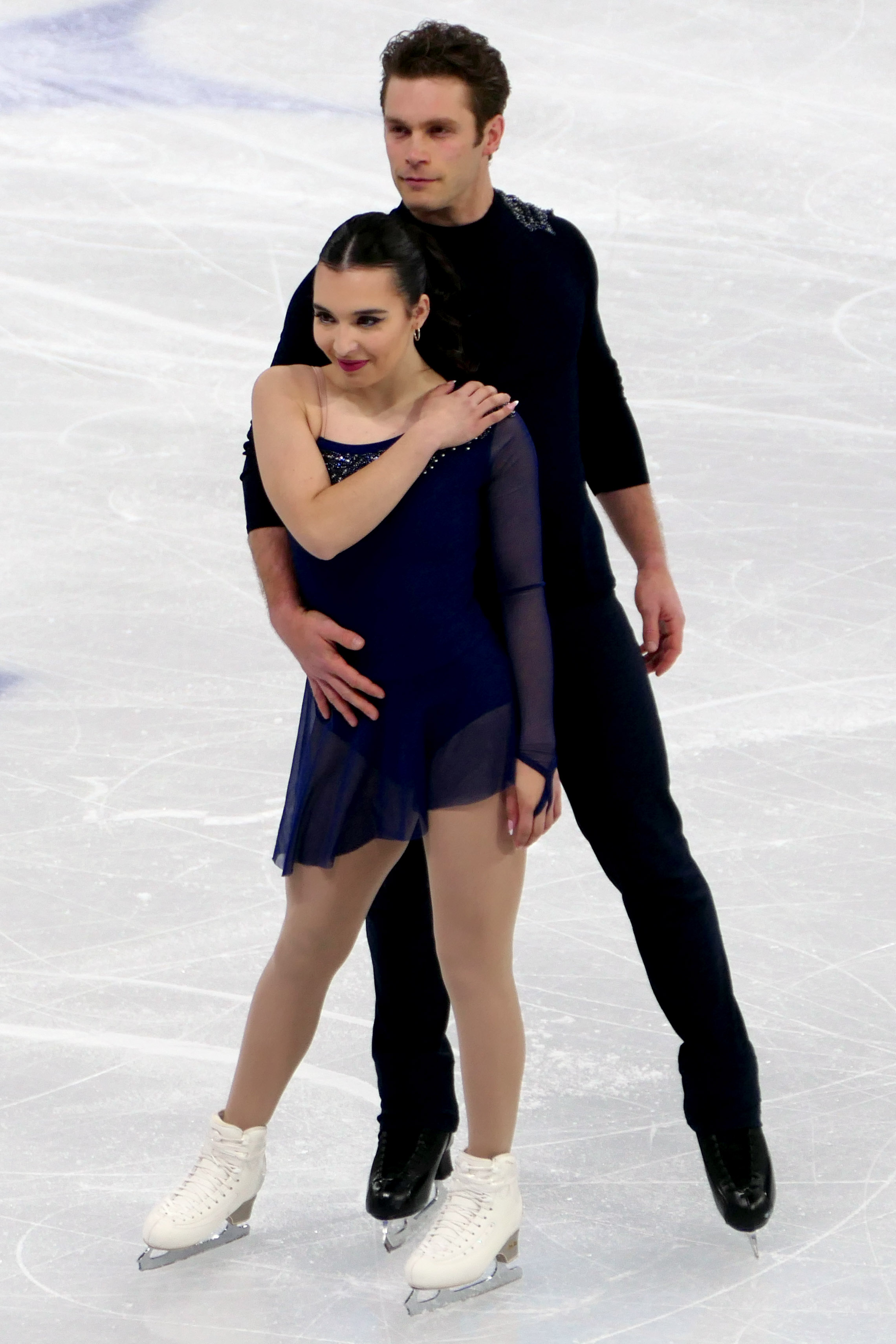
The 2026 Nebelhorn Trophy champions (from left to right): Aleksandr Selevko of Estonia (men's singles); Mia Risa Gomez of Norway (women's singles); Lia Pereira and Trennt Michaud of Canada (pair skating); and Christina Carreira and Anthony Ponomarenko of the United States (ice dance)

Medalists
Discipline	Gold	Silver	Bronze
Men	(Estonia) Aleksandr Selevko	(Germany) Genrikh Gartung	(France) François Pitot
Women	(Norway) Mia Risa Gomez	(Italy) Marina Piredda	(Canada) Fee Ann Landry
Pairs	(Canada); Lia Pereira; Trennt Michaud	(United States); Audrey Shin; Spencer Akira Howe	(China); Zhang Jiaxuan; Huang Yihang
Ice dance	(United States); Christina Carreira; Anthony Ponomarenko	(Canada); Marie-Jade Lauriault; Romain le Gac	(Australia); Holly Harris; Jason Chan

== Results ==
=== Men's singles ===
Men's results
Rank	Skater	Nation	Total points	SP		FS	
1	Aleksandr Selevko	Estonia	246.24	1	81.56	1	164.68
2	Genrikh Gartung	Germany	231.39	5	79.05	2	152.34
3	François Pitot	France	224.19	7	75.28	3	148.91
4	Kornel Witkowski	Poland	222.69	4	80.27	5	142.42
5	Liam Kapeikis	United States	221.04	3	80.34	6	140.70
6	Aleksa Rakic	Canada	219.78	2	80.56	7	139.22
7	Arlet Levandi	Estonia	218.16	9	72.19	4	145.97
8	Nikita Starostin	Germany	212.11	6	75.76	8	136.35
9	Jimmy Ma	United States	205.87	8	73.75	9	132.12
10	Tobia Oellerer	Austria	177.30	10	69.40	10	107.90
11	Fang Ze Zeng	Malaysia	158.30	11	61.77	12	96.53
12	Gabriel Martinez	Ecuador	152.22	13	53.71	11	98.50
13	Luca Fünfer	Germany	143.74	12	58.77	14	84.97
14	Dillon Judge	Ireland	131.51	14	46.12	13	85.39

=== Women's singles ===
Women's results
Rank	Skater	Nation	Total points	SP		FS	
1	Mia Risa Gomez	Norway	175.80	1	58.45	1	117.35
2	Marina Piredda	Italy	158.04	5	56.08	2	101.96
3	Fee Ann Landry	Canada	156.88	4	56.41	3	100.47
4	Logan Higase-Chen	United States	155.56	2	57.34	4	98.22
5	Nikola Fomchenkova	Latvia	151.31	3	56.92	5	94.39
6	Valentina Andrianova	Germany	138.61	6	52.13	6	86.48
7	Nela Šnebergerová	Czech Republic	123.36	9	38.61	7	84.75
8	Noelle Streuli	Poland	120.28	7	41.04	8	79.24
9	Sofja Stepčenko	Latvia	89.83	8	38.88	9	50.95

=== Pairs ===
Pairs results
Rank	Team	Nation	Total points	SP		FS	
1	Lia Pereira; Trennt Michaud	Canada	194.48	1	74.70	1	119.78
2	Audrey Shin; Spencer Akira Howe	United States	177.83	2	66.46	3	111.37
3	Zhang Jiaxuan; Huang Yihang	China	167.54	3	64.35	5	103.19
4	Ava Kemp; Yohnatan Elizarov	Canada	165.48	4	64.21	6	101.27
5	Oxana Vouillamoz; Tom Bouvart	Switzerland	165.13	11	52.74	2	112.39
6	Valentina Plazas; Maximiliano Fernandez	United States	162.57	8	54.55	4	108.02
7	Karina Akopova; Nikita Rakhmanin	Armenia	155.12	6	59.25	9	95.87
8	Anna Valesi; Martin Bidař	Czech Republic	151.72	5	59.30	11	92.42
9	Irma Caldara; Riccardo Maglio	Italy	151.41	7	55.22	7	96.19
10	Naomi Williams; Lachlan Lewer	United States	149.79	9	53.91	8	95.88
11	Aurélie Faula; Théo Belle	France	148.28	10	53.86	10	94.42

=== Ice dance ===
Ice dance results
Rank	Team	Nation	Total points	RD		FD	
1	Christina Carreira; Anthony Ponomarenko	United States	188.83	1	78.98	2	109.85
2	Marie-Jade Lauriault; Romain Le Gac	Canada	183.40	2	75.57	4	107.83
3	Holly Harris; Jason Chan	Australia	176.04	4	67.28	3	108.76
4	Kateřina Mrázková; Daniel Mrázek	Czech Republic	174.18	7	64.23	1	109.95
5	Leah Neset; Artem Markelov	United States	170.76	5	66.88	5	103.88
6	Katarina Wolfkostin; Dimitry Tsarevski	United States	167.65	3	68.33	6	99.32
7	Layla Veillon; Alexander Brandys	Canada	156.55	8	61.43	7	95.12
8	Charise Matthaei; Max Liebers	Germany	149.04	6	65.85	11	83.19
9	Carolina Portesi Peroni; Pietro Papetti	Italy	148.00	11	55.10	8	92.90
10	Louise Bordet; Martin Chardain	France	142.36	10	55.20	9	87.16
11	Karla Maria Karl; Kai Hoferichter	Germany	142.11	9	58.84	10	83.27
12	Gabriela Palomeque; Tanner White	Ecuador	98.50	12	41.86	12	56.64

== Works cited ==
- "Sports Rules – Single & Pair Skating and Ice Dance" (PDF). International Skating Union. Archived (PDF) from the original on 24 May 2026.
