= Gabriele Frangipani =

Italian figure skater (born 2001)

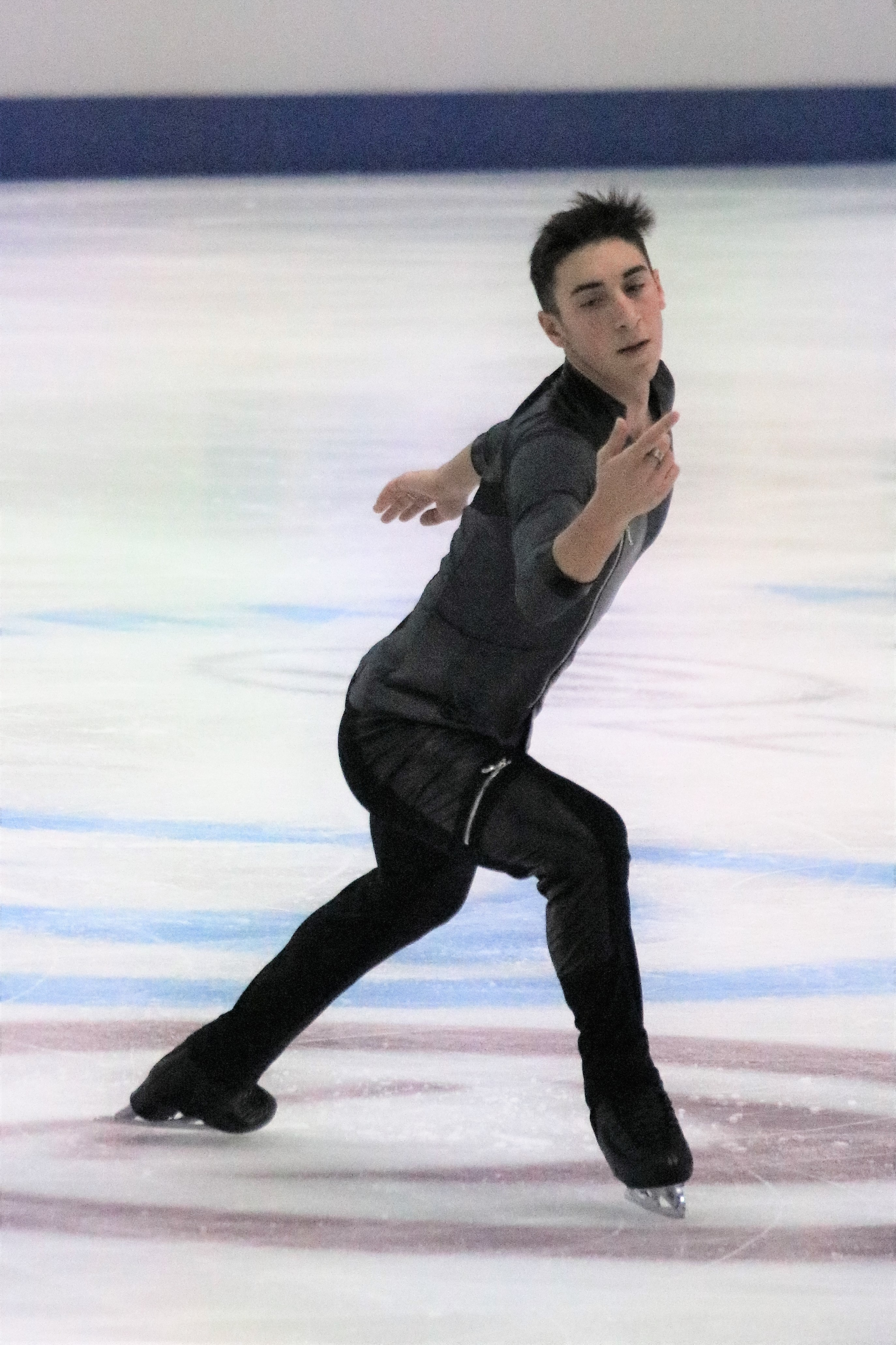
- Gabriele Frangipani at the 2020 European Championships

Personal information
- Born: 31 December 2001 (age 24) Pisa, Italy
- Home town: Bolzano, Italy
- Height: 1.70 m (5 ft 7 in)

Figure skating career
- Country: Italy
- Discipline: Men's singles
- Coach: Fabio Mascarello; Giulia Cotugno; Marilu Guarnieri
- Skating club: Gruppo Sportivo Fiamme Oro
- Began skating: 2010

Medal record
Italian Championships
Silver medal – second place	2024 Pinerolo	Singles
Bronze medal – third place	2021 Egna	Singles
Bronze medal – third place	2022 Turin	Singles
Bronze medal – third place	2023 Brunico	Singles
Bronze medal – third place	2025 Varese	Singles

Gabriele Frangipani (born 31 December 2001) is an Italian figure skater. He is a six-time ISU Challenger Series medalist (3 gold, 3 silver) and a five-time Italian national medalist (1 silver, 4 bronze). He has represented Italy at five ISU Championships, finishing as high as fourth at the 2024 European Championships.

On the junior level, he is a two-time Italian national junior champion (2019-20) and competed at the World Junior Championships twice.

== Personal life ==
Frangipani was born on December 31, 2001, in Pisa, Italy.

== Career ==
=== Early career ===
Frangipani began figure skating in 2010. His first coach was Viktoria Andreeva. He won the bronze medal at the 2014 Italian Novice Championships.

=== 2015–16 season: Junior debut ===
Frangipani began the season by winning novice bronze at the 2015 Lombardia Trophy. Making his junior international debut, he went on to finish seventh at the 2015 Denkova-Staviski Cup as well as win gold at the 2015 Merano Cup at the novice level. At the 2016 Italian Junior Championships, Frangipani finished eighth. He closed the season with a fifth-place finish at the 2016 Egna Spring Trophy on the junior level.

=== 2016–17 season ===
Frangipani began the season by winning the gold medal at the 2016 Denkova-Staviski Cup. He then went on to place seventh at the 2016 Merano Cup.

At the 2017 Italian Junior Championships, Frangipani won the bronze medal. Frangipani went on to finish ninth at the 2017 Bavarian Open before ending the season at the 2017 Cup of Tyrol with a fifth-place finish.

Following the season, Frangipani ultimately relocated to the Young Goose Academy in Egna, Italy, to train under Lorenzo Magri.

=== 2017–18 season ===
Frangipani started the season at the 2017 Golden Bear of Zagreb, where he won the silver medal. He then went on to win silver at the 2017 Leo Scheu Memorial and gold at the 2017 Merano Cup.

At the 2018 Italian Junior Championships, Frangipani won the silver medal. He went on to win gold at the 2018 Mentor Toruń Cup, before placing fourth at the 2018 Coupe du Printemps and 2018 Egna Spring Trophy.

=== 2018–19 season: Senior international debut, Italian junior national title ===
Debuting on the Junior Grand Prix series, Frangipani finished eighth at the 2018 JGP Lithuania and tenth at the 2018 JGP Slovenia. He went on to win gold medals at the 2018 Golden Bear of Zagreb and at the 2018 Alpen Trophy. He also competed at the 2018 Cup of Tyrol, where he won the silver medal as well as the gold medal at the 2018 Golden Spin of Zagreb.

At the 2019 Italian Junior Championships, Frangipani won the gold medal. Making his debut on the senior international level, Frangipani won silver at the 2019 Mentor Toruń Cup and finished fourth at the 2019 Dragon Trophy. Selected to compete at the 2019 World Junior Championships in Zagreb, Croatia, Frangipani finished the event in twenty-third place.

=== 2019–20 season: European Championships debut ===
Frangipani began the season by competing on the Junior Grand Prix series, placing seventh at the 2019 JGP Russia and ninth at the 2019 JGP Croatia. He on to compete on the senior level at the 2019 Golden Bear of Zagreb, finishing seventh. He also competed at the 2019 Warsaw Cup and the 2019 Golden Spin of Zagreb, finishing fourth and eleventh, respectively.

At the 2020 Italian Junior Championships, Frangipani won the gold medal for the second year and a row. He was ultimately selected to compete at the 2020 European Championships in Graz, Austria, where he placed thirteenth.

Frangipani ended his season at the 2020 World Junior Championships in Tallinn, Estonia, finishing fourteenth.

=== 2020–21 season: First Challenger Series medal ===
Prior to the season, Frangipani began working with Giorgia Carrossa and Eva Martinek as coaches. He began the season with a silver medal at the 2020 Nebelhorn Trophy.

Debuting on the senior level at the 2021 Italian Championships, Frangipani won the bronze medal. He then went on to finish fourth at the 2021 International Challenge Cup, before ending his season with a gold medal at the 2021 Egna Spring Trophy.

=== 2021–22 season: Grand Prix debut ===
Prior to the season, Angelina Turenko and Alisa Mikonsaari became part of Frangipani's coaching team. Frangipani started the season by placing fourth at the 2021 Nebelhorn Trophy and tenth at the 2021 Finlandia Trophy. Debuting on the Grand Prix series, Frangipani finished eleventh at the 2021 Gran Premio d'Italia and twelfth at the 2021 Internationaux de France.

At the 2022 Italian Championships, Frangipani won the bronze medal for the second year and a row. Competing at the 2022 European Championships in Tallinn, Estonia, Frangipani finished ninth. He then took the gold medal at the 2022 Merano Cup and the silver medal at the 2022 Bellu Memorial, before ending his season at the 2022 Egna Spring Trophy, where he won the gold medal for the second consecutive time.

=== 2022–23 season ===
Frangipani began the season by unexpectedly taking gold at the 2022 Nepela Memorial, scoring personal bests in all segments of the competition. He then competed at the 2022 Budapest Trophy, where he earned a new personal best in the free skate segment of the competition and finished fourth. Competing on the Grand Prix series at the 2022 NHK Trophy, Frangipani finished ninth.

At the 2023 Italian Championships, Frangipani won his third consecutive bronze medal. He was selected to compete at the 2023 European Championships in Espoo, Finland, Frangipani placed tenth.

Although Frangipani completed the short program at the 2023 International Challenge Cup, finishing seventeenth, Frangipani withdrew from the event prior to the free skate. He then ended the season with a bronze medal at the 2023 Triglav Trophy.

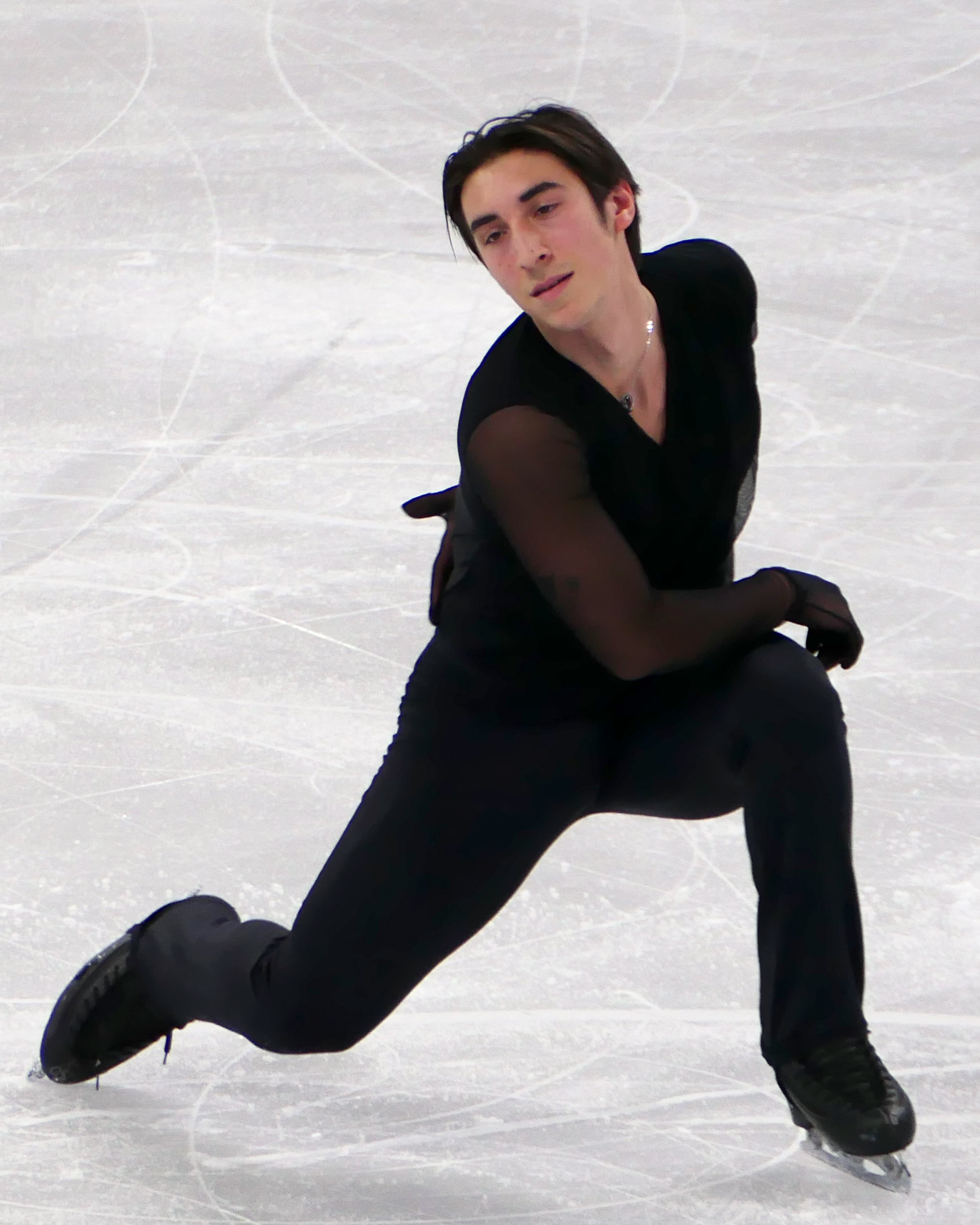
Frangipani performing his short program at the 2024 World Championships

=== 2023–24 season: World Championships debut ===
Beginning the season at the 2023 Nepela Memorial, Frangipani won the gold medal there for the second consecutive year, after finishing sixth in the short program and rising to first place with a new personal best free skate score. Given two Grand Prix assignments, he first competed at the 2023 Cup of China, where he was fifth, and fractions of a point off of fourth place. He went on to place sixth at the 2023 NHK Trophy, saying he was "about 50% pleased" with his performance there.

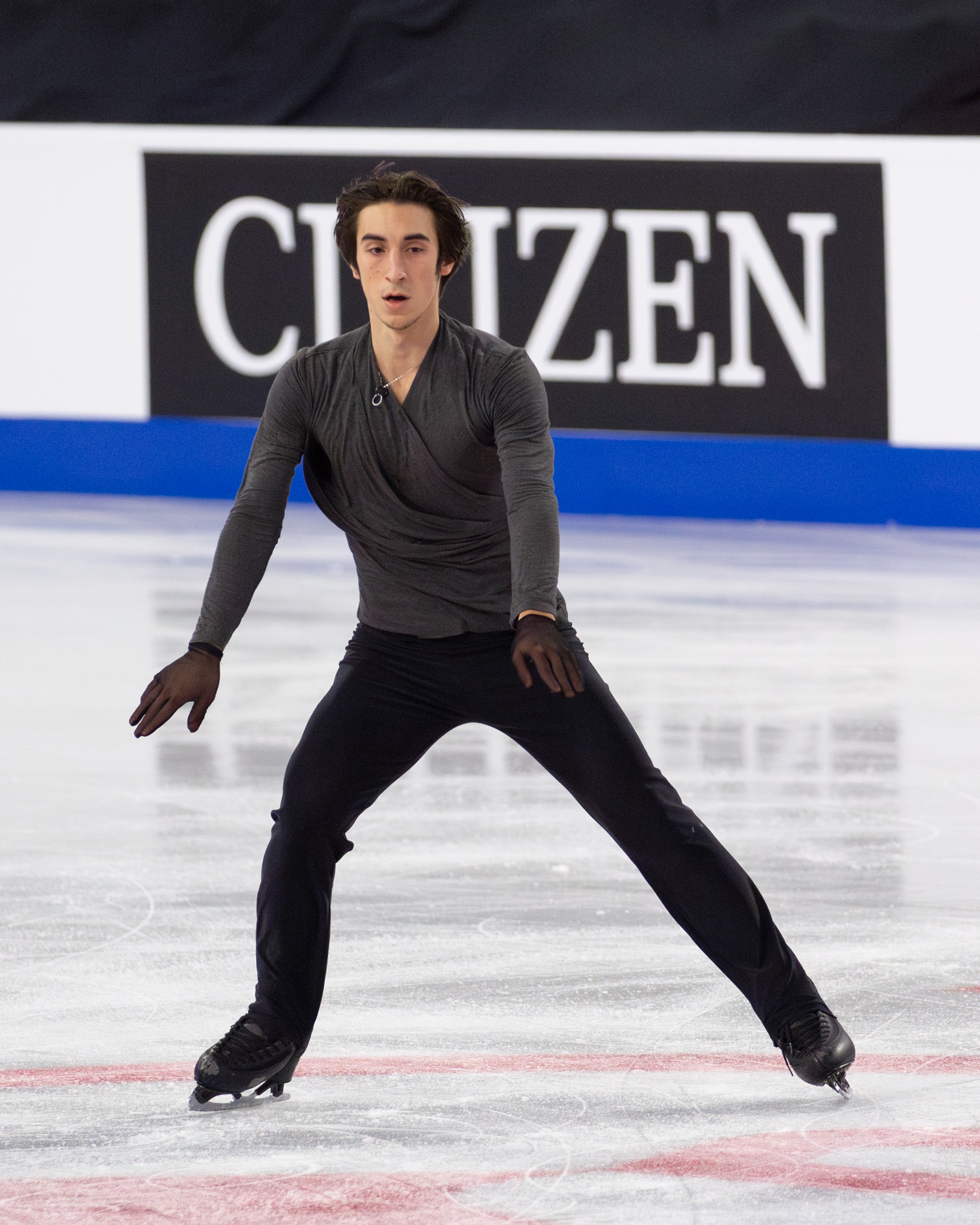
Frangipani performing his short program at 2024 Skate Canada International

After claiming the silver medal at the Italian Championships, Frangipani competed at the 2024 European Championships in Kaunas. He finished fourth in both segments, and fourth overall, narrowly losing the bronze medal to fellow Italian Matteo Rizzo after repeating too many triple jumps and thereby violating the Zayak rule. He remarked afterward that he was "feeling so stupid right now," but added "overall, I am very happy about what I showed today."

Frangipani concluded the season making his World Championship debut at the 2024 edition in Montreal, coming sixteenth.

=== 2024–25 season ===
Frangipani started the season by winning the silver medal at the 2024 CS Nebelhorn Trophy. He said he had worked “hard as ever before in his life” going into this season. He went on to compete on the 2024–25 Grand Prix circuit, he finished sixth at 2024 Skate Canada International and tenth at the 2024 NHK Trophy.

Following a silver medal win at the 2024 CS Warsaw Cup, Frangipani won the bronze medal at the 2025 Italian Championships. He then finished up the season by winning the 2025 Bavarian Open and finishing sixth at the 2025 Sonja Henie Trophy.

=== 2025–26 season ===
Frangipani began the season with a ninth-place finish at the 2025 CS Nebelhorn Trophy. He then went on to compete on the Grand Prix series, finishing twelfth at the 2025 Grand Prix de France and eleventh at the 2025 NHK Trophy. He went on to compete at the 2025 CS Warsaw Cup but withdrew from the event following the short program due to a back injury. He subsequently withdrew from the 2026 Italian Championships as well.

In March, Frangipani completed his season at the 2026 World Championships. He placed seventeenth in the short program and twenty-second in the free skate, finishing twenty-third overall. He set season's best scores in both the short program and the overall score.

== Programs ==
Season	Short program	Free skating	Exhibition
2025–26	People Get Up and Drive Your Funky Soul; I Got You (I Feel Good) by James Brown choreo. by Benoît Richaud	The Godfather; The Godfather Walz; The Immigrant; Speak Softly Love; Tarantella by Nino Rota, Carmine Coppola, & City of Prague Philharmonic Orchestra choreo. by Benoît Richaud	
2024–25	Fjara by Dirk Maassen arranged by Cédric Tour choreo. by Benoît Richaud	Echo Sax End by Caleb Arredondo; Naval by Yann Tiersen arranged by Cédric Tour; Big Plans (from The Home of Dark Butterflies) by Panu Aaltio; Silhouette by Aquilo and Jonathan Green arranged by Cédric Tour choreo. by Benoît Richaud	Ballad of a Thin Man by Bob Dylan performed by Richard Hawley
2023–24	Keeping Me Alive by Jonathan Roy choreo. by Benoît Richaud	Io ci sarò by David Foster and Walter Afanasieff performed by Andrea Bocelli and Lang Lang choreo. by Benoît Richaud	Impossible by Arnthor Birgisson & Ina Wroldsen performed by James Arthur choreo. by Benoît Richaud; Uptown Funk by Mark Ronson (feat. Bruno Mars)
2022–23	Heart Upon My Sleeve by Avicii and Imagine Dragons choreo. by Benoît Richaud	Io ci sarò by David Foster and Walter Afanasieff performed by Andrea Bocelli and Lang Lang choreo. by Benoît Richaud	
2021–22	Wild by John Legend & Gary Clark Jr. choreo. by Benoît Richaud	Red Right Hand by Nick Cave and the Bad Seeds; Ballad of a Thin Man by Bob Dylan performed by Richard Hawley; I'm a Man by Bo Diddley performed by Black Strobe choreo. by Benoît Richaud	
2020–21	Impossible written by Arnthor Birgisson, Ina Wroldsen performed by James Arthur choreo. by Benoît Richaud	Red Right Hand by Nick Cave and the Bad Seeds; Ballad of a Thin Man by Bob Dylan performed by Richard Hawley; I'm a Man by Bo Diddley performed by Black Strobe choreo. by Benoît Richaud	
2019–20	Unholy War by Jacob Banks choreo. by Benoît Richaud	Assassin's Tango (from Mr. & Mrs. Smith) by John Powell; Tango Oblivion; Adiós Nonino by Astor Piazzolla choreo. by Benoît Richaud	
2018–19	Writing's on the Wall (from Spectre) by Sam Smith choreo. by Benoît Richaud	The Phantom of the Opera by Andrew Lloyd Webber choreo. by Benoît Richaud	

== Competitive highlights ==
- GP – Event of the ISU Grand Prix Series
- JGP – Event of the ISU Junior Grand Prix Series
- CS – Event of the ISU Challenger Series
- TBD – Assigned
- WD – Withdrew from competition

Competition placements at senior level
Season	2018–19	2019–20	2020–21	2021–22	2022–23	2023-24	2024-25	2025–26	2026–27
World Championships						16th		23rd	
European Championships		13th		9th	10th	4th			
Italian Championships			3rd	3rd	3rd	2nd	3rd		
GP Cup of China						5th			
GP France				12th				12th	
GP Italy				11th					
GP NHK Trophy					9th	6th	10th	11th	
GP Skate Canada							6th		
CS Budapest Trophy					4th	10th			
CS Finlandia Trophy				10th					
CS Golden Spin of Zagreb		11th							
CS Lombardia Trophy									7th
CS Nebelhorn Trophy			2nd	4th			2nd	9th	
CS Nepela Memorial					1st	1st			
CS Tallinn Trophy									1st
CS Warsaw Cup		4th					2nd	WD	
Bellu Memorial				2nd					
Challenge Cup			4th		WD				
Dragon Trophy	4th								
Egna Spring Trophy			1st	1st					
Golden Bear of Zagreb		7th							
Mentor Toruń Cup	2nd								
Merano Ice Trophy				1st		3rd		5th	
Sonja Henie Trophy							6th		
Tirnavia Ice Cup						1st			
Triglav Trophy					3rd				

Competition placements at junior level
Season	2015–16	2016–17	2017–18	2018–19	2019–20
World Junior Championships				23rd	14th
Italian Championships	8th	3rd	2nd	1st	1st
JGP Croatia					9th
JGP Lithuania				8th	
JGP Russia					7th
JGP Slovenia				10th	
Bavarian Open		9th			
Coupe du Printemps			4th		
Cup of Tyrol		5th		2nd	
Denkova-Staviski Cup	7th	1st			
Egna Spring Trophy	5th		1st		
Golden Bear of Zagreb			2nd	1st	
Golden Spin of Zagreb				1st	
Leo Scheu Memorial			2nd		
Mentor Toruń Cup			1st		
Merano Cup		7th	1st		

== Detailed results ==
ISU personal best scores in the +5/-5 GOE System
Segment	Type	Score	Event
Total	TSS	251.59	2023 Cup of China
Short program	TSS	87.39	2022 CS Nepela Memorial
Short program	TES	49.32	2022 CS Nepela Memorial
Short program	PCS	38.90	2024 World Championships
Free skating	TSS	166.40	2024 CS Nebelhorn Trophy
Free skating	TES	87.96	2023 CS Nepela Memorial
Free skating	PCS	80.85	2024 European Championships

=== Senior level ===
Results in the 2018–19 season
Date	Event	SP		FS		Total	
Date	Event	P	Score	P	Score	P	Score
Jan 8–13, 2019	(Poland) 2019 Mentor Toruń Cup	2	68.19	1	130.77	2	198.96
Feb 7–10, 2019	(Slovenia) 2019 Dragon Trophy	5	64.55	2	126.66	4	191.21

Results in the 2019–20 season
Date	Event	SP		FS		Total	
Date	Event	P	Score	P	Score	P	Score
Oct 24–27, 2019	(Croatia) 2019 Golden Bear of Zagreb	5	62.65	8	110.35	7	173.00
Nov 14–17, 2019	(Poland) 2019 CS Warsaw Cup	3	70.14	4	132.82	4	202.96
Dec 4–7, 2019	(Croatia) 2019 CS Golden Spin of Zagreb	9	72.06	12	129.41	11	201.47
Jan 20–26, 2020	(Austria) 2020 European Championships	10	76.91	12	141.09	13	218.00

Results in the 2020–21 season
Date	Event	SP		FS		Total	
Date	Event	P	Score	P	Score	P	Score
Sep 23–26, 2020	(Germany) 2020 CS Nebelhorn Trophy	2	79.13	2	152.52	2	231.65
Dec 12–13, 2020	(Italy) 2021 Italian Championships	2	87.85	3	145.64	3	233.49
Feb 25–28, 2021	(Netherlands) 2021 International Challenge Cup	2	81.04	4	148.07	4	229.11
Apr 29 – May 2, 2021	(Italy) 2021 Egna Spring Trophy	1	71.81	2	135.11	1	206.92

Results in the 2021–22 season
Date	Event	SP		FS		Total	
Date	Event	P	Score	P	Score	P	Score
Sep 22–25, 2021	(Germany) 2021 CS Nebelhorn Trophy	4	83.11	6	146.28	4	229.39
Oct 7–10, 2021	(Finland) 2021 CS Finlandia Trophy	7	73.37	12	135.88	10	209.25
Nov 5–7, 2021	(Italy) 2021 Gran Premio d'Italia	12	55.09	11	112.51	11	167.60
Nov 19–21, 2021	2021 Internationaux de France	11	66.33	12	117.94	12	184.27
Dec 4–5, 2021	(Italy) 2022 Italian Championships	3	73.19	3	143.50	3	216.69
Jan 10–16, 2022	(Estonia) 2022 European Championships	9	81.79	10	157.16	9	238.95
Feb 5–6, 2022	(Italy) 2022 Merano Cup	2	74.65	1	150.46	1	225.11
Feb 26–27, 2022	(Romania) 2022 Bellu Memorial	1	88.99	2	140.61	2	229.60
Apr 7–10, 2022	(Italy) 2022 Egna Spring Trophy	1	85.57	1	164.94	1	250.51

Results in the 2022–23 season
Date	Event	SP		FS		Total	
Date	Event	P	Score	P	Score	P	Score
Sep 29 – Oct 1, 2022	(Slovakia) 2022 CS Nepela Memorial	1	87.39	1	157.18	1	244.57
Oct 14–16, 2022	(Hungary) 2022 CS Budapest Trophy	7	70.79	3	160.20	4	230.99
Nov 18–20, 2022	(Japan) 2022 NHK Trophy	10	68.78	9	143.53	9	212.31
Dec 15–18, 2022	(Italy) 2023 Italian Championships	4	75.79	3	156.91	3	232.70
Jan 25–29, 2023	(Finland) 2023 European Championships	7	77.35	12	134.27	10	211.62
Feb 23–26, 2023	(Netherlands) 2023 International Challenge Cup	17	48.68	—N/a	—N/a	–	WD
Apr 13–16, 2023	(Slovenia) 2023 Triglav Trophy	3	70.11	3	147.71	3	217.82

Results in the 2023–24 season
Date	Event	SP		FS		Total	
Date	Event	P	Score	P	Score	P	Score
Sep 28–30, 2023	(Slovakia) 2023 CS Nepela Memorial	6	79.04	1	164.87	1	243.91
Oct 13–15, 2023	(Hungary) 2023 CS Budapest Trophy	11	63.95	11	123.60	10	187.55
Oct 27-29, 2023	(Slovakia) 2023 Tirnavia Ice Cup	2	72.66	2	139.01	1	211.67
Nov 10–12, 2023	2023 Cup of China	5	85.19	6	166.40	5	251.59
Nov 24–26, 2023	(Japan) 2023 NHK Trophy	8	78.20	6	148.95	6	227.15
Dec 22–23, 2023	(Italy) 2024 Italian Championships	1	91.04	2	148.74	2	239.78
Jan 8–14, 2024	(Lithuania) 2024 European Championships	4	83.51	4	162.58	4	246.09
Feb 23-25, 2024	(Italy) 2024 Merano Ice Trophy	2	82.41	1	133.77	1	216.18
Mar 18–24, 2024	(Canada) 2024 World Championships	13	82.63	17	148.75	16	231.38

Results in the 2024–25 season
Date	Event	SP		FS		Total	
Date	Event	P	Score	P	Score	P	Score
Sep 19–21, 2024	(Germany) 2024 CS Nebelhorn Trophy	2	79.18	2	166.93	2	246.11
Oct 25–27, 2024	2024 Skate Canada International	10	76.18	5	146.39	6	222.57
Nov 8–10, 2024	(Japan) 2024 NHK Trophy	8	81.33	9	142.49	10	223.82
Nov 20–24, 2024	(Poland) 2024 CS Warsaw Cup	2	78.47	2	141.47	2	219.94
Dec 19–21, 2024	(Italy) 2025 Italian Championships	4	82.70	3	161.05	3	243.75
Mar 6-9, 2025	(Norway) 2025 Sonja Henie Trophy	4	71.58	9	110.55	6	182.13

Results in the 2025–26 season
Date	Event	SP		FS		Total	
Date	Event	P	Score	P	Score	P	Score
Sep 25–27, 2025	(Germany) 2025 CS Nebelhorn Trophy	10	63.76	9	134.61	9	198.37
Oct 17–19, 2025	2025 Grand Prix de France	11	71.81	11	126.18	11	197.99
Nov 7–9, 2025	(Japan) 2025 NHK Trophy	11	64.78	8	139.86	11	204.64
Nov 19–23, 2025	(Poland) 2025 CS Warsaw Cup	19	56.10	—N/a	—N/a	–	WD
Jan 22-25, 2026	(Italy) 2026 Merano Ice Trophy	2	73.17	5	131.23	5	204.40
Mar 24–29, 2026	(Czech Republic) 2026 World Championships	17	76.89	22	130.18	23	207.07

Results in the 2026–27 season
Date	Event	SP		FS		Total	
Date	Event	P	Score	P	Score	P	Score
Sep 17–20, 2026	(Italy) 2026 CS Lombardia Trophy	4	86.37	7	124.14	7	210.51
Oct 30 – Nov 1, 2026	(Slovakia) 2026 Tirnavia Ice Cup	1	73.42	1	130.53	1	203.95
Nov 16–22, 2026	(Estonia) 2026 CS Tallinn Trophy	1	80.96	3	134.23	1	215.19

=== Junior level ===
Results in the 2015–16 season
Date	Event	SP		FS		Total	
Date	Event	P	Score	P	Score	P	Score
Oct 20–25, 2015	(Bulgaria) 2015 Denkova-Staviski Cup	8	38.88	5	81.37	7	120.25
Dec 16–19, 2016	(Italy) 2016 Italian Championships (Junior)	9	41.07	8	77.45	8	118.52
Apr 15–17, 2016	(Italy) 2016 Egna Spring Trophy	6	41.18	5	79.64	5	120.82

Results in the 2016–17 season
Date	Event	SP		FS		Total	
Date	Event	P	Score	P	Score	P	Score
Oct 18–23, 2016	(Bulgaria) 2016 Denkova-Staviski Cup	1	52.88	2	92.11	1	144.99
Nov 10–13, 2016	(Italy) 2016 Merano Cup	7	50.34	7	92.13	7	142.47
Dec 14–17, 2016	(Italy) 2017 Italian Championships (Junior)	3	48.16	4	92.41	3	140.57
Feb 14–19, 2017	(Germany) 2017 Bavarian Open	8	52.83	9	90.73	9	143.56
Feb 28 – Mar 5, 2017	(Austria) 2017 Cup of Tyrol	5	52.62	6	103.18	5	155.80

Results in the 2017–18 season
Date	Event	SP		FS		Total	
Date	Event	P	Score	P	Score	P	Score
Oct 26–29, 2017	(Croatia) 2017 Golden Bear of Zagreb	1	59.17	4	85.91	2	145.08
Nov 8–12, 2017	(Austria) 2017 Leo Scheu Memorial	2	62.94	1	114.84	2	177.78
Nov 15–19, 2017	(Italy) 2017 Merano Cup	1	61.48	1	117.21	1	178.69
Dec 13–16, 2017	(Italy) 2018 Italian Championships (Junior)	1	56.18	2	110.73	2	166.91
Jan 30 – Feb 4, 2018	(Poland) 2018 Mentor Toruń Cup	1	55.94	1	98.96	1	154.90
Mar 16–18, 2018	(Luxembourg) 2018 Coupe du Printemps	4	53.36	4	110.67	4	164.03
Apr 4–8, 2018	(Italy) 2018 Egna Spring Trophy	1	72.98	2	106.95	1	179.93

Results in the 2018–19 season
Date	Event	SP		FS		Total	
Date	Event	P	Score	P	Score	P	Score
Sep 5–8, 2018	2018 JGP Lithuania	4	63.52	9	102.33	8	165.85
Oct 3–6, 2018	2018 JGP Slovenia	9	58.64	10	104.34	10	162.98
Oct 25–28, 2018	(Croatia) 2018 Golden Bear of Zagreb	1	67.24	1	125.45	1	192.69
Dec 5–8, 2018	(Croatia) 2018 Golden Spin of Zagreb	1	67.95	1	127.26	1	195.21
Dec 13–16, 2018	(Italy) 2019 Italian Championships (Junior)	1	72.29	1	124.03	1	196.32
Feb 26 – Mar 3, 2019	(Austria) 2019 Cup of Tyrol	2	64.70	2	95.32	2	160.02
Mar 4–10, 2019	(Croatia) 2019 World Junior Championships	24	61.32	23	109.57	23	170.89

Results in the 2019–20 season
Date	Event	SP		FS		Total	
Date	Event	P	Score	P	Score	P	Score
Sep 11–14, 2019	2019 JGP Russia	12	57.84	5	121.66	7	179.50
Sep 25–28, 2019	2019 JGP Croatia	5	73.32	9	117.19	9	190.51
Dec 12–15, 2019	(Italy) 2020 Italian Championships (Junior)	1	78.31	1	123.28	1	201.59
Mar 2–8, 2020	(Estonia) 2020 World Junior Championships	11	75.05	16	123.36	14	198.41
