= Pietro Papetti =

Italian ice dancer (born 1999)

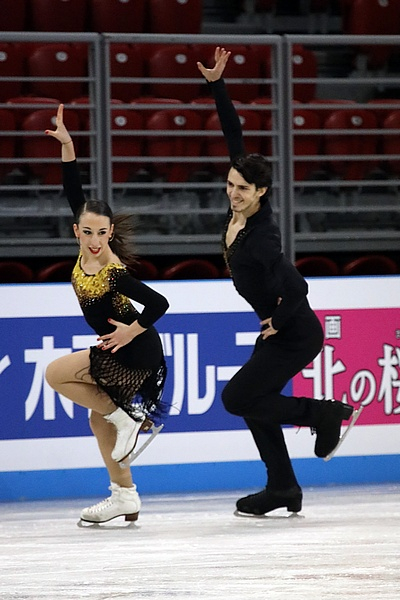
- Chiara Calderone and Pietro Papetti at the 2018 World Junior Championships

Personal information
- Born: 4 October 1999 (age 27) Bergamo, Italy
- Home town: Cenate Sopra, Italy
- Height: 1.84 m (6 ft 1/2 in)

Figure skating career
- Country: Italy
- Partner: Carolina Portesi Peroni (since 2026); Leia Dozzi (2022–26); Chiara Calderone (2017–20); Flora Mühlmeyer (2016–17); Francesca Righi (2013–16)
- Coach: Barbara Fusar-Poli; Roberto Pelizzola; Federica Bernardi
- Skating club: Ice Academy of Montreal
- Began skating: 2005

Medal record
Italian Championships
Bronze medal – third place	2024 Pinerolo	Ice dance
Bronze medal – third place	2025 Varese	Ice dance

Pietro Papetti (born 4 October 1999) is an Italian ice dancer.

With his former skating partner, Leia Dozzi, he is a two-time Italian national bronze medalist (2024–25).

With his other former skating partner, Chiara Calderone, he is the 2019 Egna Dance Trophy silver medalist and 2018 Open d'Andorra bronze medalist. Earlier in their career, Calderone/Papetti won the Italian national junior title and placed 13th at the 2018 World Junior Championships.

== Programs ==
=== With Dozzi ===
Season	Rhythm dance	Free dance
2024–2025	Tequila by The Champs; Jump in the Line (Shake, Senora) by Harry Belafonte, Lord Kitchener, Roaring Lion, Gabriel Oller, & Samuel Stevenson choreo. by Madison Hubbell, Adrián Díaz	Between These Hands (from Roma) by Asaf Avidan; Reckoning Song by Asaf Avidan & the Mojos choreo. by Madison Hubbell, Adrián Díaz
2023–2024	Muscles by Diana Ross & Michael Jackson; Upside Down by Diana Ross, Nile Rodgers, & Bernard Edwards; Let's Groove by Earth, Wind & Fire, Maurice White, & Wayne Vaughn choreo. by Madison Hubbell, Adrián Díaz	Petricor by Ludovico Einaudi & Daniel Hope; Nessun dorma by Giacomo Puccini performed by HAUSER, Robert Ziegler, & London Symphony Orchestra choreo. by Madison Hubbell, Adrián Díaz

=== With Calderone ===
Season	Rhythm dance	Free dance
2018–2019	Obertura; Adiós Nonino by Astor Piazzolla; Encanto Rojo	Starman by David Bowie; Space Oddity by David Bowie
	Short dance	
2017–2018	Samba: Rebelado performed by Latin Club; Cha Cha: Banca Banca performed by E-Type; Samba: Mujer Latina performed by Thalía choreo. by Matteo Zanni, Gianni Scandiffio	Poeta en el mar by Vicente Amigo; Farruca sin baile by El Trini; Farruca by Pepe Romero choreo. by Matteo Zanni, Gianni Scandiffio

=== With Mühlmeyer ===
Season	Short dance	Free dance
2016–2017	Blues: Letting Me Down by Jools Holland; Swing: Zoot Suit Riot by Steve Perry performed by Cherry Poppin' Daddies choreo. by Paola Mezzadri	Anna Karenina by Dario Marianelli choreo. by Paola Mezzadri

=== With Righi ===
Season	Short dance	Free dance
2015–2016	Waltz, March, Polka: Die Fledermaus by Johann Strauss II choreo. by Paola Mezzadri, Corrado Giordani	The Umbrellas of Cherbourg by Michel Legrand choreo. by Paola Mezzadri, Corrado Giordani

== Competitive highlights ==
- JGP – Event of the ISU Junior Grand Prix Series
- CS – Event of the ISU Challenger Series
- WD – Withdrew from competition

=== Ice dance with Carolina Portesi Peroni ===
Competition placements at senior level
Season	2026–27
CS Nebelhorn Trophy	9th
Iceskatera	1st
Mezzaluna Cup	3rd
NRW Trophy	3rd

=== Ice dance with Leia Dozzi ===
Competition placements at senior level
Season	2022–23	2023–24	2024–25	2025–26
European Championships		22nd		
Italian Championships	4th	3rd	3rd	5th
CS Golden Spin of Zagreb	9th			
CS Ice Challenge	6th			
CS Lombardia Trophy		8th	9th	
CS Nebelhorn Trophy			10th	
CS U.S. Classic	9th			
Bosphorus Cup		6th		
Egna Dance Trophy	2nd	4th	4th	
Ice Challenge			3rd	3rd
Lake Placid Ice Dance		14th	14th	12th
Mezzaluna Cup		7th		7th
Open d'Andorra	1st			
Road to 26 Trophy			7th	
Santa Claus Cup			5th	6th
Winter University Games	4th			

=== With Calderone ===
International
Event	2017–18	2018–19	2019–20
CS Lombardia		9th	8th
Universiade		8th	
Egna Trophy		2nd	
Open d'Andorra		3rd	
Volvo Open Cup		9th	
International: Junior
Junior Worlds	13th		
JGP Croatia	6th		
JGP Italy	7th		
Egna Trophy	3rd		
Halloween Cup	4th		
Open d'Andorra	6th		
National
Italian Champ.	1st J	4th	

=== With Mühlmeyer ===
International: Junior
Event	2016–17
World Junior Championships	24th
Bavarian Open	12th
Santa Claus Cup	12th
Toruń Cup	12th
National
Italian Championships	1st J

=== With Righi ===
International: Junior
Event	2014–15	2015–16
Youth Olympics		12th
JGP Austria		17th
JGP Spain		11th
Tallinn Trophy		10th
Toruń Cup	16th	
Santa Claus Cup	15th	8th
National
Italian Champ.	2nd J	2nd J
Team events
Youth Olympics		8th T

== Detailed results ==
=== Ice dance with Carolina Portesi Peroni ===
Results in the 2026–27 season
Date	Event	RD		FD		Total	
Date	Event	P	Score	P	Score	P	Score
Sep 24–26, 2026	(Germany) 2026 CS Nebelhorn Trophy	11	55.10	8	92.90	9	148.00
Oct 23–25, 2026	(Italy) 2026 Mezzaluna Cup	4	7.053	3	101.57	3	172.10
Nov 6–7, 2026	(Poland) 2026 Iceskatera	1	69.30	3	99.21	1	168.51
Nov 12–15, 2026	(Germany) 2026 NRW Trophy	3	59.95	3	90.90	3	150.85

=== Ice dance with Leia Dozzi ===
Results in the 2024–25 season
Date	Event	RD		FD		Total	
Date	Event	P	Score	P	Score	P	Score
Dec 19–21, 2024	(Italy) 2025 Italian Championships	2	71.92	3	106.72	3	178.64

Results in the 2025–26 season
Date	Event	RD		FD		Total	
Date	Event	P	Score	P	Score	P	Score
July 29–31, 2025	(United States) 2025 Lake Placid Ice Dance International	12	55.60	13	87.68	12	143.28
Oct 15-19, 2025	(Italy) 2025 Mezzaluna Cup	6	64.40	6	93.71	7	158.11
Nov 5–9, 2025	(Austria) 2025 Ice Challenge	4	59.91	3	101.24	3	161.15
Nov 26–30, 2025	(Hungary) 2025 Santa Claus Cup	7	61.66	5	101.36	6	163.02
Dec 17-20, 2025	(Italy) 2026 Italian Championships	5	66.12	5	103.90	5	170.02
