= Free dance =

20th-century dance form

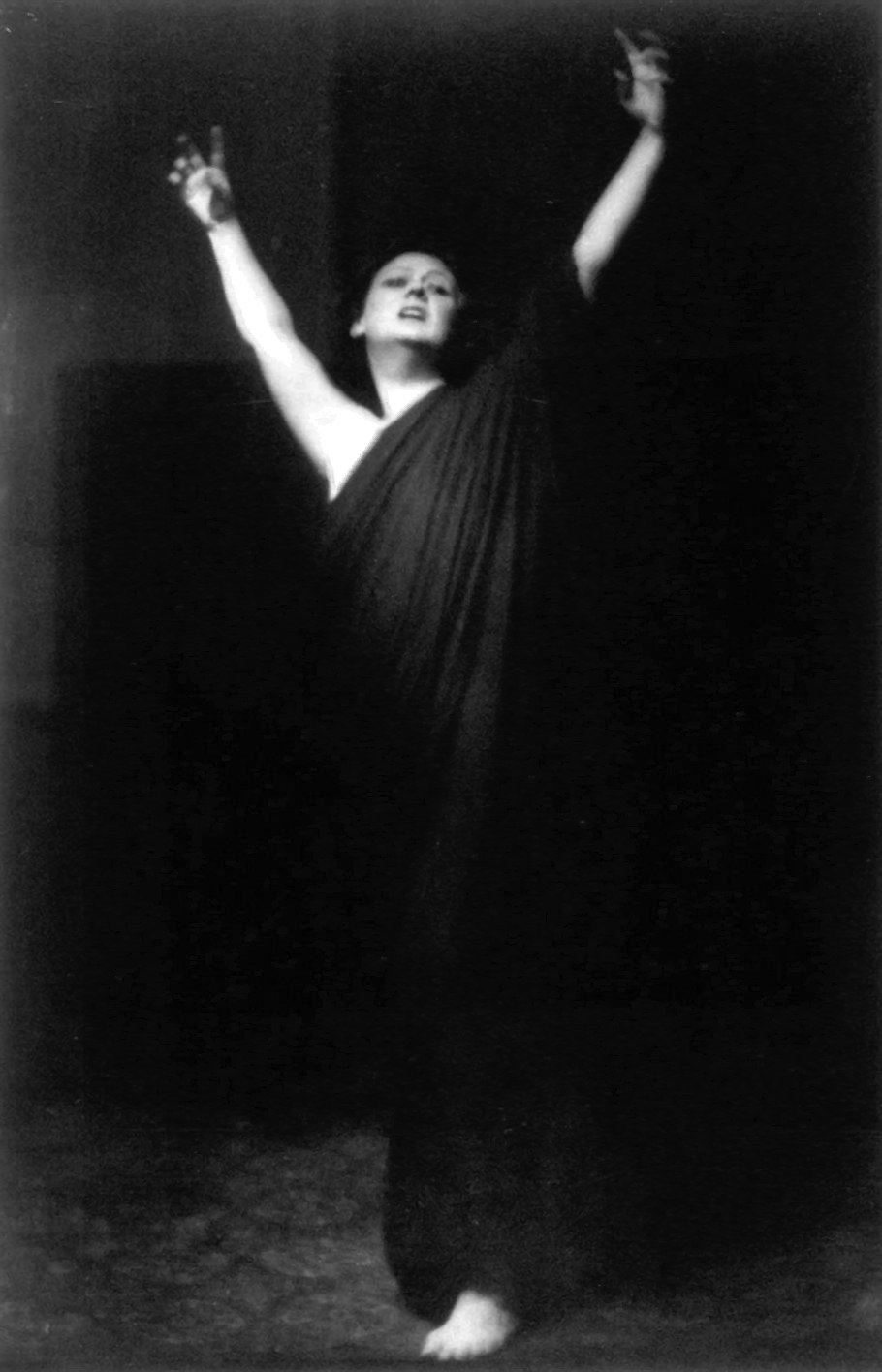
Isadora Duncan performing free dance during her 1915–18 American tour. (Photo by Arnold Genthe)

Free dance is a 20th-century dance form that preceded modern dance. Rebelling against the rigid constraints of classical ballet, Loie Fuller, Isadora Duncan and Ruth St. Denis (with her work in theater) developed their own styles of free dance and laid the foundations of American modern dance with their choreography and teaching. In Europe, Rudolf Laban, Emile Jaques-Dalcroze and François Delsarte developed their own theories of human movement and methods of instruction that led to the development of European modern and Expressionist dance.

Free dance was prolific in Central and Eastern Europe, where national schools were created, such as the School of Musical Movement (Heptachor), in Russia, and the Orkesztika School, in Hungary.

Josh Owings added much to the style of Free dance in North America. His style revolved around swift body movements combined with passionate facial expressions.

== Characteristics ==
Compared to other dance styles, free dance is regarded by artists, including Isadora Duncan, as a natural dance style.
