= Violetta Sierova =

Ukrainian pair skater

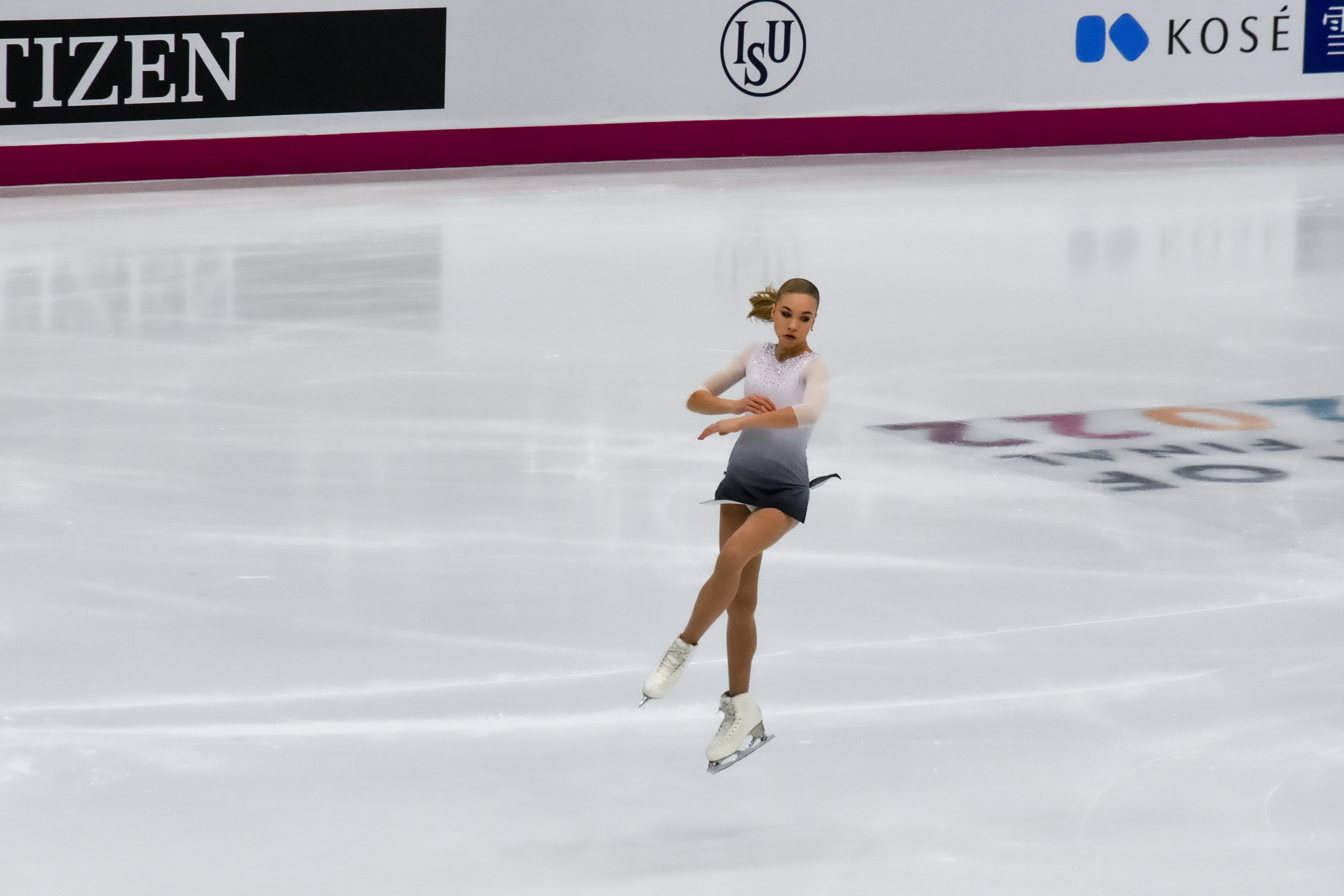

Personal information
- Native name: Віолетта Русланівна Сєрова (Ukrainian)
- Full name: Violetta Ruslanivna Sierova
- Other names: Serova; Violetta/Viktoriia Bychkova
- Born: 24 February 2007 (age 19) Kyiv, Ukraine
- Home town: Kyiv
- Height: 1.63 m (5 ft 4 in)

Figure skating career
- Country: Ukraine
- Partner: Ivan Khobta (2018–2024)
- Coach: Filip Zalevski
- Skating club: Sport School Leader Kyiv
- Began skating: 2010
Medal record
Ukrainian Championships
Gold medal – first place	2021 Kyiv	Pairs
Silver medal – second place	2019 Kyiv	Pairs
Silver medal – second place	2020 Kyiv	Pairs
World Junior Championships
Bronze medal – third place	2023 Calgary	Pairs

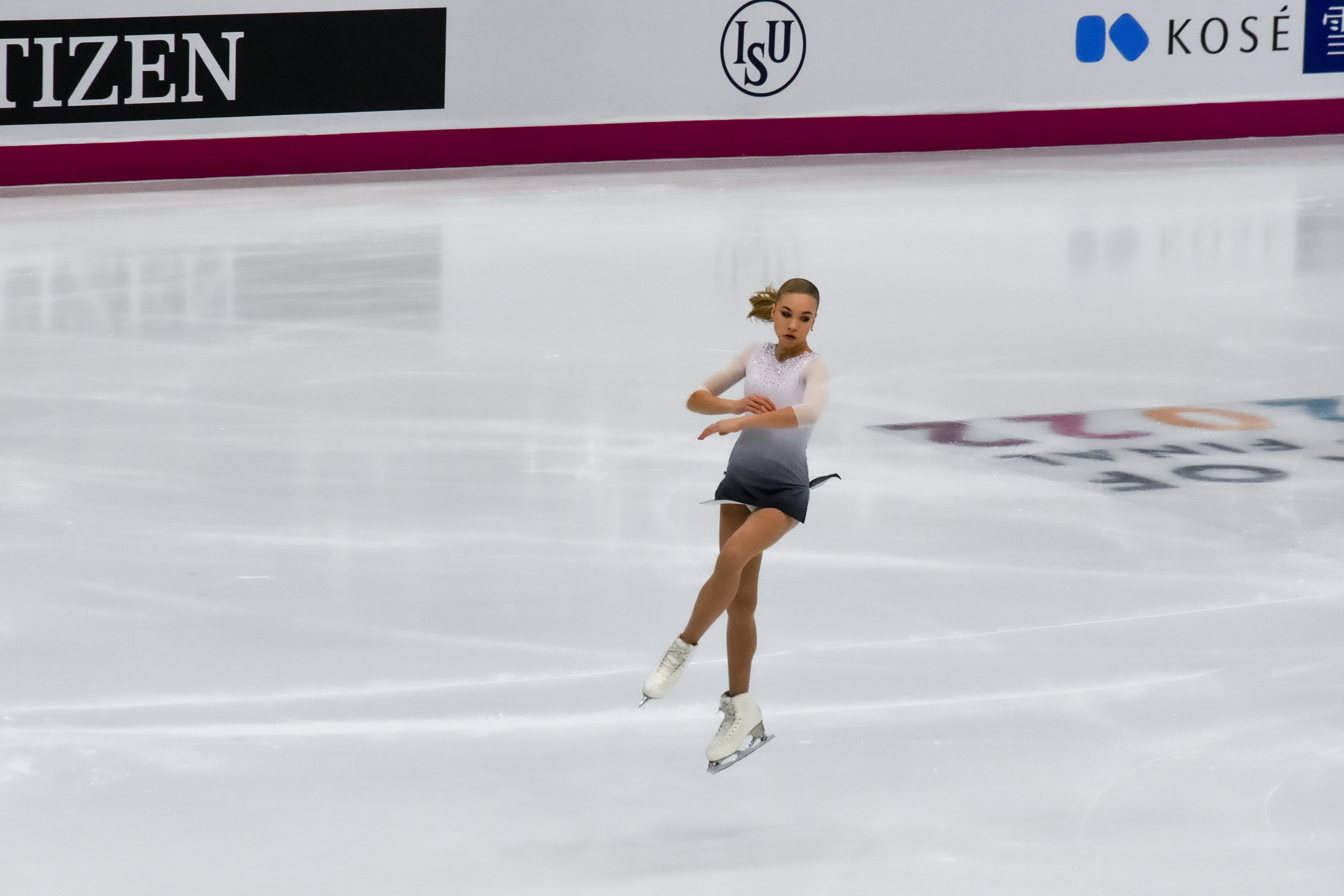
2022 Figure Skating Grand Prix Final Violetta Sierova

Violetta Ruslanivna Sierova (Ukrainian: Віолетта Русланівна Сєрова; born 24 February 2007) is a Ukrainian pair skater. With former skating partner, Ivan Khobta, she is the 2023 World Junior bronze medalist and a four-time silver medalist on the ISU Junior Grand Prix series. Competing as seniors, they are the 2022 Ice Challenge bronze medalists and 2021 Ukrainian national champions.

== Personal life ==
Sierova was born on 24 February 2007 in Kyiv, Ukraine. She has an older brother.

== Career ==
=== Early career ===
Sierova began figure skating in 2010.

She and pair partner, Ivan Khobta, debuted during the 2018–19 figure skating season, winning gold at the 2019 Ukrainian Novice Championships, silver at the 2019 Ukrainian Junior Championships, and silver at the 2019 Ukrainian Championships.

The following year, they won their second consecutive gold medal at the 2020 Ukrainian Novice Championships, gold at the 2020 Ukrainian Junior Championships, and silver at the 2020 Ukrainian Championships. Additionally, they won gold at the novice level at the 2019 Ice Star and at the 2019 Volvo Open Cup.

During the 2020–21 figure skating season, Sierova/Khobta won gold at both the 2021 Ukrainian Junior Championships, and the at the 2021 Ukrainian Championships.

=== 2021–22 season ===
Sierova/Khobta debuted on the 2021–22 Junior Grand Prix series, placing fifth at 2021 JGP Slovakia and seventh at 2021 JGP Austria. They then went on to win their third consecutive gold medal at the 2022 Ukrainian Junior Championships.

With Sierova and Khobta's hometown of Kyiv becoming a central point of conflict, they were forced to relocate elsewhere to train. They and coach Filip Zalevski ultimately settled in Bergamo, Italy and Chemnitz, Germany to train. Despite the invasion, they competed at the 2022 World Junior Championships in Tallinn, Estonia, and finished sixth.

=== 2022–23 season ===
Sierova/Khobta began their season at the 2022 JGP Poland I and 2022 JGP Poland II, winning silver at both events and ultimately qualifying for the 2022–23 Junior Grand Prix Final. They went on to compete at the 2022 CS Ice Challenge and the 2022 CS Warsaw Cup, placing third and sixth, respectively.

At the 2022–23 Junior Grand Prix Final in Turin, Italy, Sierova/Khobta finished fifth. Competing on the senior level at the 2023 European Championships in Espoo, Finland, Sierova/Khobta placed tenth in the short program and eighth in the free skate, finishing in ninth-place overall.

Sierova/Khobta went on to compete at the 2023 World Junior Championships in Calgary, Alberta, coming fourth in the short program, but only narrowly behind the third-place team. In the free skate, they set a new personal best and moved up to third place overall, winning the bronze medal. This was the first World Junior pairs medal for Ukraine since 2000, and the first in any discipline since ice dance team Nazarova/Nikitin's bronze in 2015. Speaking afterward, they said that they felt "all the support of the Ukrainian diaspora in Canada and that gave us strength. We hope to do our best in our next competition. This Junior Worlds was very important for us and our country."

At the 2023 World Championships in Saitama, Japan, Sierova/Khobta placed twenty-second in the short program, failing to qualify for the free skate, after missing a planned triple twist.

=== 2023–24 season ===
Sierova/Khobta began the season on the Junior Grand Prix, winning the silver medal at the 2023 JGP Hungary in Budapest. With Sierova recovering from injury, they restricted themselves to double elements other than their triple twist. They won another silver medal at their second event, the 2023 JGP Poland, qualifying to their second consecutive Junior Grand Prix Final.

Following their Junior Grand Prixes, the team took three weeks off training in the hopes that Sierova could recover from her hip and back problems. However, upon restarting their preparations they discovered the issues remained. They were limited in what elements they could attempt at the Final, and finished in sixth place. Sierova hoped to be able to perform triple jumps in the future, once her health was restored.

Sierova's health continued to be an issue for the team in the remainder of the season, and they finished seventh at the 2024 World Junior Championships in Taipei.

The pair announced their separation in September 2024.

== Programs ==
=== With Khobta ===
Season	Short program	Free skating	Exhibition
2023–2024	If I Can Dream by Elvis Presley & Walter Earl Brown performed by Måneskin choreo. by Filip Zalevski, Hendrik Hilpert, Raffaella Cazzaniga	Bird Set Free by Sia & Greg Kurstin choreo. by Filip Zalevski	
2022–2023	Весна (Vesna) by Vopli Vidopliassova choreo. by Filip Zalevski, Oleksii Oliinyk	Halo by Beyoncé choreo. by Filip Zalevski, Oleksii Oliinyk	Zori by Kalush
2021–2022	Birds of Prey by Daniel Pemberton; Joke's on You (from Birds of Prey) by Charlotte Lawrence choreo. by Filip Zalevski, Oleksii Oliinyk	Halo by Beyoncé choreo. by Filip Zalevski, Oleksii Oliinyk	

== Competitive highlights ==
CS: Challenger Series; JGP: Junior Grand Prix

=== With Khobta ===
International
Event	18–19	19–20	20–21	21–22	22–23	23–24
Worlds					22nd	
Europeans					9th	
CS Warsaw Cup					6th	
Ice Challenge					3rd	
International: Junior
Junior Worlds				6th	3rd	7th
JGP Final					5th	6th
JGP Austria				7th		
JGP Hungary						2nd
JGP Poland					2nd^{1}	2nd
JGP Poland					2nd^{2}	
JGP Slovakia				5th		
International: Advanced novice
Ice Star		1st N				
Volvo Open Cup		1st N				
National
Ukrainian Champ.	2nd	2nd	1st	WD		WD
Ukrainian Junior	2nd	1st	1st	1st		
Ukrainian Novice	1st	1st				
^{1}JGP Poland I; ^{2}JGP Poland II; TBD = Assigned; Levels: N = Novice

== Detailed results ==
Small medals for short and free programs are awarded only at ISU Championships. Personal bests are highlighted in bold.

=== With Khobta ===
==== Junior results ====
2023–24 season
Date	Event	Level	SP	FS	Total
Feb. 26 – Mar. 3, 2024	2024 World Junior Championships	Junior	8; 48.93	7; 85.08	7; 134.01
December 7–10, 2023	2023–24 JGP Final	Junior	6; 47.52	5; 92.65	6; 140.17
September 27–30, 2023	2023 JGP Poland	Junior	2; 54.51	2; 97.02	2; 151.53
September 20–23, 2023	2023 JGP Hungary	Junior	1; 55.52	2; 98.25	2; 153.77
2022–23 season
March 22–25, 2023	2023 World Championships	Senior	22; 44.74	–	22; 44.74
February 27–March 5, 2023	2023 World Junior Championships	Junior	4; **58.47**	3; **100.92**	3; **159.39**
January 23–29, 2023	2023 European Championships	Senior	10; 47.53	8; 96.19	9; 143.72
November 17–20, 2022	2022 CS Warsaw Cup	Senior	5; 53.65	6; 99.74	6; 153.39
November 9–13, 2022	2022 CS Ice Challenge	Senior	3; 47.25	3; 93.11	3; 140.36
November 3–4, 2022	2022–23 JGP Final	Junior	4; 50.74	5; 92.32	5; 143.06
October 5–8, 2022	2022 JGP Poland II	Junior	3; 55.50	2; 99.26	2; 154.76
September 28–October 1, 2022	2022 JGP Poland I	Junior	3; 55.23	3; 88.25	2; 143.48
2021–22 season
Date	Event	Level	SP	FS	Total
April 13–17, 2022	2022 World Junior Championships	Junior	6; 49.57	6; 84.89	6; 134.46
January 25–27, 2022	2022 Ukrainian Junior Championships	Junior	1; 52.29	1; 94.27	1; 146.56
October 6–9, 2021	2021 JGP Austria	Junior	6; 52.77	7; 97.77	7; 150.54
September 1–4, 2021	2021 JGP Slovakia	Junior	6; 45.14	4; 98.08	5; 143.22
