= Ivan Khobta =

Ukrainian pair skater (born 2003)

Personal information
- Native name: Іван Хобта (Ukrainian)
- Other names: Hobta
- Born: 31 July 2003 (age 23) Kyiv, Ukraine
- Home town: Kyiv
- Height: 1.83 m (6 ft 0 in)

Figure skating career
- Country: Ukraine
- Discipline: Pairs (since 2018)
- Partner: Hannah Herrera (since 2025); Violetta Sierova (2018–2024)
- Coach: Drew Meekins; Natalia Mishkutenok; Filip Zalevski
- Skating club: Leader Kyiv
- Began skating: 2007
Medal record
Ukrainian Championships
Gold medal – first place	2021 Kyiv	Pairs
Silver medal – second place	2019 Kyiv	Pairs
Silver medal – second place	2020 Kyiv	Pairs
World Junior Championships
Bronze medal – third place	2023 Calgary	Pairs
Bronze medal – third place	2026 Tallinn	Pairs

Ivan Khobta (Ukrainian: Іван Хобта, born 31 July 2003) is a Ukrainian pair skater who currently competes with Hannah Herrera. With Herrera, he is the 2026 World Junior bronze medalist.

With former skating partner, Violetta Sierova, he is the 2023 World Junior bronze medalist and a four-time silver medalist on the ISU Junior Grand Prix series. Competing as seniors, they are the 2022 Ice Challenge bronze medalists and 2021 Ukrainian national champions.

== Personal life ==
Khobta was born on 31 July 2003 in Kyiv, Ukraine.

== Career ==
=== Partnership with Sierova ===
==== Early career ====
Khobta began figure skating in 2007.

He and pair partner, Violetta Sierova, debuted during the 2018–19 figure skating season, winning gold at the 2019 Ukrainian Novice Championships, silver at the 2019 Ukrainian Junior Championships, and silver at the 2019 Ukrainian Championships.

The following year, they won their second consecutive gold medal at the 2020 Ukrainian Novice Championships, gold at the 2020 Ukrainian Junior Championships, and silver at the 2020 Ukrainian Championships. Additionally, they won gold at the novice level at the 2019 Ice Star and at the 2019 Volvo Open Cup.

During the 2020–21 figure skating season, Sierova/Khobta won gold at both the 2021 Ukrainian Junior Championships, and the at the 2021 Ukrainian Championships.

==== 2021–2022 season: Junior international debut ====
Sierova/Khobta debuted on the 2021–22 Junior Grand Prix series, placing fifth at 2021 JGP Slovakia and seventh at 2021 JGP Austria. They then went on to win their third consecutive gold medal at the 2022 Ukrainian Junior Championships.

With Sierova and Khobta's hometown of Kyiv becoming a central point of conflict, they were forced to relocate elsewhere to train. They and coach Filip Zalevski ultimately settled in Bergamo, Italy and Chemnitz, Germany to train. Despite the invasion, they competed at the 2022 World Junior Championships in Tallinn, Estonia, and finished sixth.

==== 2022–2023 season: Senior international debut, World Junior bronze ====
Sierova/Khobta began their season at the 2022 JGP Poland I and 2022 JGP Poland II, winning silver at both events and ultimately qualifying for the 2022–23 Junior Grand Prix Final. They went on to compete at the 2022 CS Ice Challenge and the 2022 CS Warsaw Cup, placing third and sixth, respectively.

At the 2022–23 Junior Grand Prix Final in Turin, Italy, Sierova/Khobta finished fifth. Competing on the senior level at the 2023 European Championships in Espoo, Finland, Sierova/Khobta placed tenth in the short program and eighth in the free skate, finishing in ninth-place overall.

Sierova/Khobta went on to compete at the 2023 World Junior Championships in Calgary, Alberta, coming fourth in the short program, but only narrowly behind the third-place team. In the free skate, they set a new personal best and moved up to third place overall, winning the bronze medal. This was the first World Junior pairs medal for Ukraine since 2000, and the first in any discipline since ice dance team Nazarova/Nikitin's bronze in 2015. Speaking afterward, they said that they felt "all the support of the Ukrainian diaspora in Canada and that gave us strength. We hope to do our best in our next competition. This Junior Worlds was very important for us and our country."

At the 2023 World Championships in Saitama, Japan, Sierova/Khobta placed twenty-second in the short program, failing to qualify for the free skate, after missing a planned triple twist.

==== 2023–2024 season ====
Sierova/Khobta began the season on the Junior Grand Prix, winning the silver medal at the 2023 JGP Hungary in Budapest. With Sierova recovering from injury, they restricted themselves to double elements other than their triple twist. They won another silver medal at their second event, the 2023 JGP Poland, qualifying to their second consecutive Junior Grand Prix Final.

Following their Junior Grand Prixes, the team took three weeks off training in the hopes that Sierova could recover from her hip and back problems. However, upon restarting their preparations they discovered the issues remained. They were limited in what elements they could attempt at the Final, and finished in sixth place. Sierova hoped to be able to perform triple jumps in the future, once her health was restored.

Sierova's health continued to be an issue for the team in the remainder of the season, and they finished seventh at the 2024 World Junior Championships in Taipei.

The pair announced their separation in September 2024.

=== Partnership with Herrera ===
==== 2025–2026 season: World Junior bronze ====
In June 2025, the Ukrainian Figure Skating Federation announced that Khobta had teamed up with American-born singles skater Hannah Herrera and that the team would train in Colorado Springs, Colorado, United States under Drew Meekins and Natalia Mishkutenok, in addition to Khobta's longtime coach, Filip Zalevski.

The pair debuted at the 2025 John Nicks International Pairs Challenge, where they won the silver medal on the junior level. Additionally, they won the bronze medal at the 2026 Bavarian Open in January. A few weeks later they won the gold medal at the 2026 Skate Berlin.

The pair made their Junior World debut in March 2026 where they won the bronze medal after placing 5th in the short program and 2nd in the free skate segments. Khobta shared, “Well, I’m glad even with the little mistakes that we made. We were able to show those elements that we’ve been working on. I really enjoyed skating today. I think for this first World Championships in this new partnership, it was really good because we just started to skate together in June. So we really didn’t have much time, but I’m really glad that I am here and that I’m speaking here right now.”

== Programs ==
=== With Herrera ===
Season	Short program	Free skating
2025–2026	Aware by Adrián Berenguer choreo. by Drew Meekins	Primavera by Ludovico Einaudi choreo. by Drew Meekins

=== With Sierova ===
Season	Short program	Free skating	Exhibition
2023–2024	If I Can Dream by Elvis Presley & Walter Earl Brown performed by Måneskin choreo. by Filip Zalevski, Hendrik Hilpert, Raffaella Cazzaniga	Bird Set Free by Sia & Greg Kurstin choreo. by Filip Zalevski	
2022–2023	Весна (Vesna) by Vopli Vidopliassova choreo. by Filip Zalevski, Oleksii Oliinyk	Halo by Beyoncé choreo. by Filip Zalevski, Oleksii Oliinyk	Zori by Kalush
2021–2022	Birds of Prey by Daniel Pemberton; Joke's on You (from Birds of Prey) by Charlotte Lawrence choreo. by Filip Zalevski, Oleksii Oliinyk	Halo by Beyoncé choreo. by Filip Zalevski, Oleksii Oliinyk	

== Competitive highlights ==
CS: Challenger Series; JGP: Junior Grand Prix

=== Pair skating with Hannah Herrera ===
Competition placements at senior level
Season	2026–27
GP France	8th
GP Finland	TBD

Competition placements at junior level
Season	2025–26
World Junior Championships	3rd
Bavarian Open	3rd
John Nicks Pairs Challenge	2nd
Skate Berlin	1st

=== Pair skating with Violetta Sierova ===
International
Event	18–19	19–20	20–21	21–22	22–23	23–24
Worlds					22nd	
Europeans					9th	
CS Warsaw Cup					6th	
Ice Challenge					3rd	
International: Junior
Junior Worlds				6th	3rd	7th
JGP Final					5th	6th
JGP Austria				7th		
JGP Hungary						2nd
JGP Poland					2nd^{1}	2nd
JGP Poland					2nd^{2}	
JGP Slovakia				5th		
National
Ukrainian Champ.	2nd	2nd	1st	WD		WD
Ukrainian Junior	2nd	1st	1st	1st		

== Detailed results ==
=== With Herrera ===
ISU personal best scores in the +5/-5 GOE System
Segment	Type	Score	Event
Total	TSS	160.15	2026 World Junior Championships
Short program	TSS	56.95	2026 World Junior Championships
Short program	TES	31.97	2026 World Junior Championships
Short program	PCS	24.98	2026 World Junior Championships
Free skating	TSS	103.20	2026 World Junior Championships
Free skating	TES	52.26	2026 World Junior Championships
Free skating	PCS	50.94	2026 World Junior Championships

==== Senior Results ====
Results in the 2026-27 season
Date	Event	SP		FS		Total	
Date	Event	P	Score	P	Score	P	Score
Oct 23-25, 2026	2026 Grand Prix de France	8	53.73	8	88.23	8	141.96

==== Junior Results ====
Results in the 2025–26 season
Date	Event	SP		FS		Total	
Date	Event	P	Score	P	Score	P	Score
Sep 2–3, 2025	(United States) 2025 John Nicks Pairs Challenge	2	54.30	3	83.49	2	137.79
Jan 27 – Feb 1, 2026	(Germany) 2026 Bavarian Open	3	55.02	5	95.04	3	150.06
Feb 17-21, 2026	(Germany) 2026 Skate Berlin International	1	56.94	1	101.67	1	158.61
Mar 3-8, 2026	(Estonia) 2026 World Junior Championships	5	56.95	2	103.20	3	160.15

=== With Sierova ===
==== Junior results ====
2023–24 season
Date	Event	Level	SP	FS	Total
Feb. 26 – Mar. 3, 2024	2024 World Junior Championships	Junior	8; 48.93	7; 85.08	7; 134.01
December 7–10, 2023	2023–24 JGP Final	Junior	6; 47.52	5; 92.65	6; 140.17
September 27–30, 2023	2023 JGP Poland	Junior	2; 54.51	2; 97.02	2; 151.53
September 20–23, 2023	2023 JGP Hungary	Junior	1; 55.52	2; 98.25	2; 153.77
2022–23 season
March 22–25, 2023	2023 World Championships	Senior	22; 44.74	–	22; 44.74
February 27–March 5, 2023	2023 World Junior Championships	Junior	4; 58.47	3; 100.92	3; 159.39
January 23–29, 2023	2023 European Championships	Senior	10; 47.53	8; 96.19	9; 143.72
November 17–20, 2022	2022 CS Warsaw Cup	Senior	5; 53.65	6; 99.74	6; 153.39
November 9–13, 2022	2022 CS Ice Challenge	Senior	3; 47.25	3; 93.11	3; 140.36
November 3–4, 2022	2022–23 JGP Final	Junior	4; 50.74	5; 92.32	5; 143.06
October 5–8, 2022	2022 JGP Poland II	Junior	3; 55.50	2; 99.26	2; 154.76
September 28–October 1, 2022	2022 JGP Poland I	Junior	3; 55.23	3; 88.25	2; 143.48
2021–22 season
Date	Event	Level	SP	FS	Total
April 13–17, 2022	2022 World Junior Championships	Junior	6; 49.57	6; 84.89	6; 134.46
January 25–27, 2022	2022 Ukrainian Junior Championships	Junior	1; 52.29	1; 94.27	1; 146.56
October 6–9, 2021	2021 JGP Austria	Junior	6; 52.77	7; 97.77	7; 150.54
September 1–4, 2021	2021 JGP Slovakia	Junior	6; 45.14	4; 98.08	5; 143.22
