= Manacorda =

Manacorda is an Italian surname. Notable people with the surname include:

- Antonello Manacorda (born 1970), Italian violinist and conductor
- Bianca Manacorda (born 1997), Italian pair skater
