= 2022–23 Grand Prix of Figure Skating Final =

Figure skating competition

2022–23 Grand Prix Final
- Type: Grand Prix
- Date: December 8 – December 11, 2022
- Season: 2022–23
- Location: Turin, Italy
- Host: Italian Ice Sports Federation
- Venue: Torino Palavela

Champions
- Men's singles: (Japan) Shoma Uno (S) (Italy) Nikolaj Memola (J)
- Ladies' singles: (Japan) Mai Mihara (S) (Japan) Mao Shimada (J)
- Pairs: (Japan) Riku Miura / Ryuichi Kihara (S) (Australia) Anastasia Golubeva / Hektor Giotopoulos Moore (J)
- Ice dance: (Canada) Piper Gilles / Paul Poirier (S) (Canada) Nadiia Bashynska / Peter Beaumont (J)
- Previous: 2019–20 Grand Prix Final
- Next: 2023–24 Grand Prix Final
- Previous Grand Prix: 2022 Grand Prix of Espoo
- Next Grand Prix: 2023 Skate America

The 2022–23 Grand Prix of Figure Skating Final and ISU Junior Grand Prix Final were held from December 8–11, 2022 at the Torino Palavela in Turin, Italy. The combined event was the culmination of two international series: the Grand Prix of Figure Skating and the Junior Grand Prix. Medals were awarded in men's singles, women's singles, pair skating, and ice dance at both the senior and junior levels.

== Qualifiers ==
=== Senior qualifiers ===
No.	Men	Women	Pairs	Ice dance
1	(United States) Ilia Malinin	(Japan) Mai Mihara	(Japan) Riku Miura / Ryuichi Kihara	(Canada) Piper Gilles / Paul Poirier
2	(Japan) Shoma Uno	(Belgium) Loena Hendrickx	(United States) Alexa Knierim / Brandon Frazier	(Italy) Charlène Guignard / Marco Fabbri
3	(Japan) Kao Miura	(Japan) Kaori Sakamoto	(Canada) Deanna Stellato-Dudek / Maxime Deschamps	(Canada) Laurence Fournier Beaudry / Nikolaj Sørensen
4	(Japan) Sōta Yamamoto	(South Korea) Kim Ye-lim	(United States) Emily Chan / Spencer Akira Howe	(United States) Madison Chock / Evan Bates
5	(Italy) Daniel Grassl	(United States) Isabeau Levito	(Italy) Rebecca Ghilardi / Filippo Ambrosini	(United Kingdom) Lilah Fear / Lewis Gibson
6	(Japan) Shun Sato	(Japan) Rinka Watanabe	(Italy) Sara Conti / Niccolò Macii	(United States) Kaitlin Hawayek / Jean-Luc Baker

Alternates

No.	Men	Women	Pairs	Ice dance
1	(France) Adam Siao Him Fa	(Japan) Rion Sumiyoshi	(France) Camille Kovalev / Pavel Kovalev	(Canada) Marjorie Lajoie / Zachary Lagha
2	(South Korea) Cha Jun-hwan	(South Korea) You Young	(Canada) Brooke McIntosh / Benjamin Mimar	(United States) Caroline Green / Michael Parsons
3	(Japan) Kazuki Tomono	(South Korea) Lee Hae-in	(Georgia (country)) Anastasiia Metelkina / Daniil Parkman	(France) Evgeniia Lopareva / Geoffrey Brissaud

=== Junior qualifiers ===
No.	Men	Women	Pairs	Ice dance
1	(United States) Lucas Broussard	(Japan) Mao Shimada	(Australia) Anastasia Golubeva / Hektor Giotopoulos Moore	(Czech Republic) Kateřina Mrázková / Daniel Mrázek
2	(Italy) Nikolaj Memola	(Japan) Hana Yoshida	(United States) Cayla Smith / Andy Deng	(Canada) Nadiia Bashynska / Peter Beaumont
3	(Japan) Shunsuke Nakamura	(South Korea) Shin Ji-a	(United States) Sophia Baram / Daniel Tioumentsev	(South Korea) Hannah Lim / Ye Quan
4	(Japan) Takeru Amine Kataise	(Japan) Ami Nakai	(Ukraine) Violetta Sierova / Ivan Khobta	(Germany) Darya Grimm / Michail Savitskiy
5	(Japan) Nozomu Yoshioka	(South Korea) Kim Chae-yeon	(Canada) ~~Ava Rae Kemp / Yohnatan Elizarov~~ (withdrew)	(United Kingdom) Phebe Bekker / James Hernandez
6	(United States) Robert Yampolsky	(South Korea) Kwon Min-sol	(Canada) Chloe Panetta / Kieran Thrasher	(France) Célina Fradji / Jean-Hans Fourneaux

Alternates

No.	Men	Women	Pairs	Ice dance
1	(Japan) Rio Nakata	(Japan) Mone Chiba	(Japan) Haruna Murakami / Sumitada Moriguchi (called up)	(Canada) Sandrine Gauthier / Quentin Thieren
2	(South Korea) Cha Young-hyun	(Japan) Ayumi Shibayama	(Canada) Ashlyn Schmitz / Tristan Taylor	(Ukraine) Mariia Pinchuk / Mykyta Pogorielov
3	(South Korea) Seo Min-kyu	(Georgia (country)) Inga Gurgenidze	(France) Oxana Vouillamoz / Flavien Giniaux	(United States) Vanessa Pham / Jonathan Rogers

== Changes to preliminary assignments ==
Discipline	Withdrew		Added		Notes	Ref.
Discipline	Date	Skater(s)	Date	Skater(s)	Notes	Ref.
Junior pairs	December 1	(Canada) Ava Rae Kemp / Yohnatan Elizarov	December 1	(Japan) Haruna Murakami / Sumitada Moriguchi	Injury (Kemp)	

== Medals summary ==
=== Senior medalists ===
Discipline	Gold	Silver	Bronze
Men	(Japan) Shoma Uno	(Japan) Sota Yamamoto	(United States) Ilia Malinin
Women	(Japan) Mai Mihara	(United States) Isabeau Levito	(Belgium) Loena Hendrickx
Pairs	(Japan) Riku Miura / Ryuichi Kihara	(United States) Alexa Knierim / Brandon Frazier	(Italy) Sara Conti / Niccolò Macii
Ice dance	(Canada) Piper Gilles / Paul Poirier	(United States) Madison Chock / Evan Bates	(Italy) Charlène Guignard / Marco Fabbri

=== Junior medalists ===
Discipline	Gold	Silver	Bronze
Men	(Italy) Nikolaj Memola	(United States) Lucas Broussard	(Japan) Nozomu Yoshioka
Women	(Japan) Mao Shimada	(South Korea) Shin Ji-a	(South Korea) Kim Chae-yeon
Pairs	(Australia) Anastasia Golubeva / Hektor Giotopoulos Moore	(United States) Sophia Baram / Daniel Tioumentsev	(United States) Cayla Smith / Andy Deng
Ice dance	(Canada) Nadiia Bashynska / Peter Beaumont	(South Korea) Hannah Lim / Ye Quan	(Czech Republic) Kateřina Mrázková / Daniel Mrázek

=== Medals table ===
==== Senior ====
Rank	Nation	Gold	Silver	Bronze	Total
1	Japan	3	1	0	4
2	Canada	1	0	0	1
3	United States	0	3	1	4
4	Italy	0	0	2	2
5	Belgium	0	0	1	1
Totals (5 entries)		4	4	4	12

==== Junior ====
Rank	Nation	Gold	Silver	Bronze	Total
1	Japan	1	0	1	2
2	Australia	1	0	0	1
2	Canada	1	0	0	1
2	Italy	1	0	0	1
5	South Korea	0	2	1	3
5	United States	0	2	1	3
7	Czech Republic	0	0	1	1
Totals (7 entries)		4	4	4	12

== Senior-level results ==
=== Men's singles ===
Rank	Skater	Nation	Total points	SP		FS	
1st place, gold medalist(s)	Shoma Uno	Japan	304.46	1	99.99	1	204.47
2nd place, silver medalist(s)	Sōta Yamamoto	Japan	274.35	2	94.86	3	179.49
3rd place, bronze medalist(s)	Ilia Malinin	United States	271.94	5	80.10	2	191.84
4	Shun Sato	Japan	250.16	6	76.62	4	173.54
5	Kao Miura	Japan	245.74	3	87.07	6	158.67
6	Daniel Grassl	Italy	244.97	4	80.40	5	164.57

=== Women's singles ===
Rank	Skater	Nation	Total points	SP		FS	
1st place, gold medalist(s)	Mai Mihara	Japan	208.17	2	74.58	1	133.59
2nd place, silver medalist(s)	Isabeau Levito	United States	197.23	5	69.26	2	127.97
3rd place, bronze medalist(s)	Loena Hendrickx	Belgium	196.35	3	74.24	4	122.11
4	Rinka Watanabe	Japan	196.01	4	72.58	3	123.43
5	Kaori Sakamoto	Japan	192.56	1	75.86	6	116.70
6	Kim Ye-lim	South Korea	180.58	6	61.55	5	119.03

=== Pairs ===
Rank	Team	Nation	Total points	SP		FS	
1st place, gold medalist(s)	Riku Miura / Ryuichi Kihara	Japan	214.58	1	78.08	1	136.50
2nd place, silver medalist(s)	Alexa Knierim / Brandon Frazier	United States	213.28	2	77.65	2	135.63
3rd place, bronze medalist(s)	Sara Conti / Niccolò Macii	Italy	187.02	4	67.30	3	119.72
4	Deanna Stellato-Dudek / Maxime Deschamps	Canada	184.28	3	69.34	5	114.94
5	Rebecca Ghilardi / Filippo Ambrosini	Italy	180.39	5	63.54	4	116.85
6	Emily Chan / Spencer Akira Howe	United States	162.91	6	53.85	6	109.06

=== Ice dance ===
Rank	Team	Nation	Total points	RD		FD	
1st place, gold medalist(s)	Piper Gilles / Paul Poirier	Canada	215.64	1	85.93	1	129.71
2nd place, silver medalist(s)	Madison Chock / Evan Bates	United States	211.94	2	85.49	2	126.45
3rd place, bronze medalist(s)	Charlène Guignard / Marco Fabbri	Italy	206.84	3	84.55	3	122.29
4	Lilah Fear / Lewis Gibson	Great Britain	200.90	5	80.75	4	120.15
5	Kaitlin Hawayek / Jean-Luc Baker	United States	198.06	6	79.50	5	118.56
6	Laurence Fournier Beaudry / Nikolaj Sørensen	Canada	196.15	4	83.16	6	112.99

== Junior-level results ==
=== Men's singles ===
Rank	Skater	Nation	Total points	SP		FS	
1st place, gold medalist(s)	Nikolaj Memola	Italy	230.50	2	79.84	1	150.66
2nd place, silver medalist(s)	Lucas Broussard	United States	220.43	1	81.11	3	139.32
3rd place, bronze medalist(s)	Nozomu Yoshioka	Japan	208.01	5	66.83	2	141.18
4	Shunsuke Nakamura	Japan	198.64	3	74.81	6	123.83
5	Robert Yampolsky	United States	198.02	4	73.32	4	124.71
6	Takeru Amine Kataise	Japan	182.49	6	58.19	5	124.30

=== Women's singles ===
Rank	Skater	Nation	Total points	SP		FS	
1st place, gold medalist(s)	Mao Shimada	Japan	205.54	1	69.66	1	135.88
2nd place, silver medalist(s)	Shin Ji-a	South Korea	200.32	2	69.11	2	131.21
3rd place, bronze medalist(s)	Kim Chae-yeon	South Korea	190.36	3	66.71	3	123.65
4	Ami Nakai	Japan	189.23	4	65.97	4	123.26
5	Kwon Min-sol	South Korea	175.43	5	59.91	5	115.52
6	Hana Yoshida	Japan	158.30	6	55.51	6	102.79

=== Pairs ===
Rank	Team	Nation	Total points	SP		FS	
1st place, gold medalist(s)	Anastasia Golubeva / Hektor Giotopoulos Moore	Australia	181.37	2	60.19	1	121.18
2nd place, silver medalist(s)	Sophia Baram / Daniel Tioumentsev	United States	176.78	1	63.62	2	113.16
3rd place, bronze medalist(s)	Cayla Smith / Andy Deng	United States	150.51	3	55.21	4	95.30
4	Haruna Murakami / Sumitada Moriguchi	Japan	149.03	5	46.80	3	102.23
5	Violetta Sierova / Ivan Khobta	Ukraine	143.06	4	50.74	5	92.32
6	Chloe Panetta / Kieran Thrasher	Canada	130.89	6	44.35	6	86.54

=== Ice dance ===
Rank	Team	Nation	Total points	RD		FD	
1st place, gold medalist(s)	Nadiia Bashynska / Peter Beaumont	Canada	167.26	1	67.74	1	99.52
2nd place, silver medalist(s)	Hannah Lim / Ye Quan	South Korea	162.53	3	64.21	2	98.32
3rd place, bronze medalist(s)	Kateřina Mrázková / Daniel Mrázek	Czech Republic	161.54	4	64.08	3	97.46
4	Phebe Bekker / James Hernandez	Great Britain	156.97	2	64.58	4	92.39
5	Darya Grimm / Michail Savitskiy	Germany	152.01	5	62.21	5	89.80
6	Célina Fradji / Jean-Hans Fourneaux	France	140.71	6	59.23	6	81.48
