= 2023 European Figure Skating Championships =

Figure skating competition

- Type: ISU Championship
- Date: 25 – 29 January
- Season: 2022–23
- Location: Espoo, Finland
- Host: Finnish Figure Skating Association
- Venue: Espoo Metro Areena

Champions
- Men's singles: (France) Adam Siao Him Fa
- Women's singles: (Georgia (country)) Anastasiia Gubanova
- Pairs: (Italy) Sara Conti / Niccolò Macii
- Ice dance: (Italy) Charlène Guignard / Marco Fabbri
- Previous: 2022 European Championships
- Next: 2024 European Championships

The 2023 European Figure Skating Championships were held from 25 to 29 January 2023 at the Espoo Metro Areena in Espoo, Finland. Medals were awarded in men's singles, women's singles, pair skating, and ice dance. The competition determined the entry quotas for each skating federation at the 2024 European Championships.

== Qualification ==
=== Age and minimum TES requirements ===
The competition was open to skaters from all European member nations of the International Skating Union. The corresponding competition for non-European skaters was the 2023 Four Continents Championships.

Skaters were eligible if they turned 15 years of age before 1 July 2022 and met the minimum technical elements score requirements. The ISU accepted scores if they were obtained at senior-level ISU-recognized international competitions during the ongoing season at least 21 days before the first official practice day of the championships or during the preceding season.

Minimum technical scores
Discipline	SP / RD	FS / FD
Men	28	46
Women	25	42
Pairs	25	42
Ice dance	28	45

- SP/RD and FS/FD scores may be attained at different events.

=== Number of entries per discipline ===
Based on the results of the 2022 European Championships, each European ISU member nations could field one to three entries per discipline. However, on 1 March 2022, in accordance with a recommendation by the International Olympic Committee, the International Skating Union (ISU) banned figure skaters and officials from Russia and Belarus from attending all international competitions due to the 2022 Russian invasion of Ukraine.

Number of entries per discipline
Spots	Men	Women	Pairs	Ice dance
3	Italy; ~~Russia~~	~~Russia~~	Italy; ~~Russia~~	~~Russia~~; Spain
2	Azerbaijan; Czech Republic; France; Georgia; Latvia	Azerbaijan; ~~Belarus~~; Belgium; Estonia; Georgia; Poland; Switzerland	~~Belarus~~; Georgia; Germany; Hungary; Spain	France; Great Britain; Italy; Lithuania; Ukraine

- If not listed above, one entry is allowed.

== Schedule ==
Date	Disc.	Time	Segment
Wednesday, 25 January	Pairs	13:15	Short program
Wednesday, 25 January	—N/a	16:45	Opening ceremony
Wednesday, 25 January	Men	17:40	Short program
Thursday, 26 January	Women	13:35	Short program
Thursday, 26 January	Pairs	19:25	Free skating
Friday, 27 January	Ice dance	13:15	Rhythm dance
Friday, 27 January	Men	18:00	Free skating
Saturday, 28 January	Women	13:00	Free skating
Saturday, 28 January	Ice dance	18:30	Free dance
Sunday, 29 January	—N/a	15:30	Exhibition gala

- All times are listed in local time (UTC+02:00).

== Entries ==
Member nations began announcing their selections in December 2022. The International Skating Union published a complete list of entries on 3 January 2023.

Country	Men	Women	Pairs	Ice dance
Armenia	—N/a			Viktoriia Azroian / Artur Gruzdev
Austria	Maurizio Zandron	Olga Mikutina	Sophia Schaller / Livio Mayr	—N/a
Azerbaijan	—N/a	—N/a	—N/a	Samantha Ritter / Daniel Brykalov
Belgium	—N/a	Loena Hendrickx	—N/a	—N/a
Belgium	—N/a	Nina Pinzarrone	—N/a	—N/a
Bulgaria	Larry Loupolover	Alexandra Feigin	—N/a	—N/a
Croatia	Jari Kessler	—N/a	—N/a	—N/a
Cyprus	—N/a	Marilena Kitromilis	—N/a	—N/a
Czech Republic	Petr Kotlařík	Nikola Rychtaříková	Federica Simoli / Alessandro Zarbo	Natálie Taschlerová / Filip Taschler
Czech Republic	Georgii Reshtenko	—N/a	—N/a	—N/a
Estonia	Mihhail Selevko	Eva-Lotta Kiibus	—N/a	—N/a
Estonia	—N/a	Niina Petrõkina	—N/a	—N/a
Finland	Valtter Virtanen	Janna Jyrkinen	—N/a	Juulia Turkkila / Matthias Versluis
France	Kévin Aymoz	Léa Serna	Camille Kovalev / Pavel Kovalev	Loïcia Demougeot / Théo le Mercier
France	Adam Siao Him Fa	—N/a	—N/a	Evgenia Lopareva / Geoffrey Brissaud
Georgia	Nika Egadze	Anastasiia Gubanova	—N/a	Maria Kazakova / Georgy Reviya
Georgia	Morisi Kvitelashvili	—N/a	—N/a	—N/a
Germany	Nikita Starostin	Nicole Schott	Alisa Efimova / Ruben Blommaert	Jennifer Janse van Rensburg / Benjamin Steffan
Germany	—N/a		Annika Hocke / Robert Kunkel	—N/a
Great Britain	Graham Newberry	Natasha McKay	Anastasia Vaipan-Law / Luke Digby	Lilah Fear / Lewis Gibson
Greece	—N/a	Alexandra Mintsidou	—N/a	
Hungary	Aleksandr Vlasenko	Júlia Láng	Maria Pavlova / Alexei Sviatchenko	Mariia Ignateva / Danijil Leonyidovics Szemko
Ireland	Samuel McAllister	—N/a		—N/a
Israel	Mark Gorodnitsky	—N/a		Mariia Nosovitskaya / Mikhail Nosovitskiy
Italy	Gabriele Frangipani	Lara Naki Gutmann	Lucrezia Beccari / Matteo Guarise	Charlène Guignard / Marco Fabbri
Italy	Daniel Grassl	—N/a	Sara Conti / Niccolò Macii	Victoria Manni / Carlo Röthlisberger
Italy	Matteo Rizzo	—N/a	Rebecca Ghilardi / Filippo Ambrosini	—N/a
Latvia	Deniss Vasiļjevs	Sofja Stepčenko	—N/a	Aurelija Ipolito / Luke Russell
Lithuania	—N/a	Meda Variakojytė	—N/a	Paulina Ramanauskaitė / Deividas Kizala
Lithuania	—N/a	—N/a	—N/a	Allison Reed / Saulius Ambrulevičius
Moldova	—N/a	Anastasia Gracheva	—N/a	—N/a
Monaco	Davide Lewton Brain	—N/a	—N/a	—N/a
Netherlands	—N/a	Lindsay van Zundert	Nika Osipova / Dmitry Epstein	Hanna Jakucs / Alessio Galli
Norway	—N/a	Mia Caroline Risa Gomez	—N/a	Maria Bjørkli / James Koszuta
Poland	Vladimir Samoilov	Ekaterina Kurakova	—N/a	Anastasia Polibina / Pavel Golovishnikov
Romania	—N/a	Julia Sauter	—N/a	—N/a
Serbia	—N/a	Antonina Dubinina	—N/a	—N/a
Slovakia	Adam Hagara	Alexandra Michaela Filcová	—N/a	Anna Šimová / Kirill Aksenov
Slovenia	David Sedej	Daša Grm	—N/a	—N/a
Spain	Tomàs-Llorenç Guarino Sabaté	—N/a	—N/a	—N/a
Sweden	Andreas Nordebäck	Josefin Taljegård	Greta Crafoord / John Crafoord	—N/a
Switzerland	Lukas Britschgi	Livia Kaiser	—N/a	Arianna Sassi / Luca Morini
Switzerland	—N/a	Kimmy Repond	—N/a	—N/a
Turkey	Burak Demirboğa	—N/a	—N/a	—N/a
Ukraine	Kyrylo Marsak	Anastasia Gozhva	Violetta Sierova / Ivan Khobta	Mariia Holubtsova / Kyryl Bielobrov
Ukraine	—N/a			Mariia Pinchuk / Mykyta Pogorielov

=== Changes to preliminary assignments ===
Date	Discipline	Withdrew	Added	Notes	Ref.
16 January	Pairs	(Georgia (country)) Anastasia Metelkina / Daniil Parkman	—N/a	Metelkina & Parkman split.	
16 January	Pairs	(Georgia (country)) Karina Safina / Luka Berulava	—N/a	Injury (Safina)	
17 January	Men	(Azerbaijan) Vladimir Litvintsev	—N/a	Visa issue	
18 January	Men	(Ukraine) Ivan Shmuratko	(Ukraine) Kyrylo Marsak	Injury	
18 January	Women	(Lithuania) Aleksandra Golovkina	(Lithuania) Jogailė Aglinskytė	Injury	
19 January	Women	(Czech Republic) Barbora Vránková	(Czech Republic) Nikola Rychtaříková	Illness	
21 January	Women	(Lithuania) Jogailė Aglinskytė	(Lithuania) Meda Variakojytė	Injury	
23 January	Women	(Israel) Mariia Seniuk	—N/a	Injury	
24 January	Women	(Denmark) Maia Sørensen	—N/a		

== Medal summary ==
=== Medalists ===
Medals awarded to the skaters who achieved the highest overall placements in each discipline:

Discipline	Gold	Silver	Bronze
Men	(France) Adam Siao Him Fa	(Italy) Matteo Rizzo	(Switzerland) Lukas Britschgi
Women	(Georgia (country)) Anastasiia Gubanova	(Belgium) Loena Hendrickx	(Switzerland) Kimmy Repond
Pairs	(Italy) Sara Conti / Niccolò Macii	(Italy) Rebecca Ghilardi / Filippo Ambrosini	(Germany) Annika Hocke / Robert Kunkel
Ice dance	(Italy) Charlène Guignard / Marco Fabbri	(United Kingdom) Lilah Fear / Lewis Gibson	(Finland) Juulia Turkkila / Matthias Versluis

Small medals awarded to the skaters who achieved the highest short program or rhythm dance placements in each discipline:

Discipline	Gold	Silver	Bronze
Men	(France) Adam Siao Him Fa	(Italy) Matteo Rizzo	(Latvia) Deniss Vasiļjevs
Women	(Georgia (country)) Anastasiia Gubanova	(Belgium) Loena Hendrickx	(Switzerland) Kimmy Repond
Pairs	(Italy) Sara Conti / Niccolò Macii	(Germany) Annika Hocke / Robert Kunkel	(Germany) Alisa Efimova / Ruben Blommaert
Ice dance	(Italy) Charlène Guignard / Marco Fabbri	(United Kingdom) Lilah Fear / Lewis Gibson	(Finland) Juulia Turkkila / Matthias Versluis

Small medals awarded to the skaters who achieved the highest free skating or free dance placements in each discipline:

Discipline	Gold	Silver	Bronze
Men	(Italy) Matteo Rizzo	(France) Adam Siao Him Fa	(Switzerland) Lukas Britschgi
Women	(Georgia (country)) Anastasiia Gubanova	(Switzerland) Kimmy Repond	(Belgium) Loena Hendrickx
Pairs	(Italy) Rebecca Ghilardi / Filippo Ambrosini	(Italy) Sara Conti / Niccolò Macii	(Germany) Annika Hocke / Robert Kunkel
Ice dance	(Italy) Charlène Guignard / Marco Fabbri	(United Kingdom) Lilah Fear / Lewis Gibson	(Finland) Juulia Turkkila / Matthias Versluis

=== Medals by country ===
Table of medals for overall placement:

Rank	Nation	Gold	Silver	Bronze	Total
1	Italy	2	2	0	4
2	France	1	0	0	1
2	Georgia	1	0	0	1
4	Belgium	0	1	0	1
4	Great Britain	0	1	0	1
6	Switzerland	0	0	2	2
7	Finland	0	0	1	1
7	Germany	0	0	1	1
Totals (8 entries)		4	4	4	12

Table of small medals for placement in the short/rhythm segment:

Rank	Nation	Gold	Silver	Bronze	Total
1	Italy	2	1	0	3
2	France	1	0	0	1
2	Georgia	1	0	0	1
4	Germany	0	1	1	2
5	Belgium	0	1	0	1
5	Great Britain	0	1	0	1
7	Finland	0	0	1	1
7	Latvia	0	0	1	1
7	Switzerland	0	0	1	1
Totals (9 entries)		4	4	4	12

Table of small medals for placement in the free segment:

Rank	Nation	Gold	Silver	Bronze	Total
1	Italy	3	1	0	4
2	Georgia	1	0	0	1
3	Switzerland	0	1	1	2
4	France	0	1	0	1
4	Great Britain	0	1	0	1
6	Belgium	0	0	1	1
6	Finland	0	0	1	1
6	Germany	0	0	1	1
Totals (8 entries)		4	4	4	12

== Results ==
=== Men's singles ===
Rank	Name	Nation	Total points	SP		FS	
1st place, gold medalist(s)	Adam Siao Him Fa	France	267.77	1	96.53	2	171.24
2nd place, silver medalist(s)	Matteo Rizzo	Italy	259.92	2	86.46	1	173.46
3rd place, bronze medalist(s)	Lukas Britschgi	Switzerland	248.01	5	79.26	3	168.75
4	Kévin Aymoz	France	240.92	4	83.75	4	157.17
5	Deniss Vasiļjevs	Latvia	236.35	3	84.81	6	151.54
6	Daniel Grassl	Italy	230.83	8	77.03	5	153.80
7	Nika Egadze	Georgia	220.65	12	72.96	7	147.69
8	Mihhail Selevko	Estonia	218.30	11	73.74	8	144.56
9	Andreas Nordebäck	Sweden	212.95	9	75.98	10	136.97
10	Gabriele Frangipani	Italy	211.62	7	77.35	12	134.27
11	Maurizio Zandron	Austria	207.68	13	72.57	11	135.11
12	Tomàs-Llorenç Guarino Sabaté	Spain	205.19	14	71.65	13	133.54
13	Mark Gorodnitsky	Israel	202.34	22	64.94	9	137.40
14	Valtter Virtanen	Finland	198.28	18	68.33	14	129.95
15	Nikita Starostin	Germany	197.97	10	74.70	17	123.27
16	Morisi Kvitelashvili	Georgia	194.59	16	70.55	16	124.04
17	Vladimir Samoilov	Poland	191.59	6	78.26	21	113.33
18	Adam Hagara	Slovakia	189.72	21	65.15	15	124.57
19	Jari Kessler	Croatia	182.83	19	67.87	19	114.96
20	Burak Demirboğa	Turkey	182.82	23	64.33	18	118.49
21	Kyrylo Marsak	Ukraine	181.98	17	70.41	22	111.57
22	Davide Lewton Brain	Monaco	179.54	20	66.07	20	113.47
23	Graham Newberry	Great Britain	174.64	15	70.85	24	103.79
24	Aleksandr Vlasenko	Hungary	173.94	24	62.49	23	111.45
Did not advance to free skating
25	Petr Kotlařík	Czech Republic	60.24	25	60.24	—N/a	
26	Georgii Reshtenko	Czech Republic	54.52	26	54.52	—N/a	
27	Larry Loupolover	Bulgaria	53.26	27	53.26	—N/a	
28	Samuel McAllister	Ireland	48.07	28	48.07	—N/a	
29	David Sedej	Slovenia	46.28	29	46.28	—N/a	

=== Women's singles ===
Rank	Name	Nation	Total points	SP		FS	
1st place, gold medalist(s)	Anastasiia Gubanova	Georgia	199.91	1	69.81	1	130.10
2nd place, silver medalist(s)	Loena Hendrickx	Belgium	193.48	2	67.85	3	125.63
3rd place, bronze medalist(s)	Kimmy Repond	Switzerland	192.51	3	63.83	2	128.68
4	Ekaterina Kurakova	Poland	186.90	5	61.81	4	125.09
5	Nina Pinzarrone	Belgium	185.92	6	61.35	5	124.57
6	Niina Petrõkina	Estonia	183.74	7	61.05	6	122.69
7	Janna Jyrkinen	Finland	176.96	8	60.77	7	116.19
8	Lara Naki Gutmann	Italy	169.29	13	55.39	8	113.90
9	Nicole Schott	Germany	163.82	16	54.33	9	109.49
10	Julia Sauter	Romania	160.42	11	56.58	12	103.84
11	Sofja Stepčenko	Latvia	159.34	14	55.32	11	104.02
12	Olga Mikutina	Austria	159.08	4	62.78	18	96.30
13	Marilena Kitromilis	Cyprus	158.91	18	53.71	10	105.20
14	Lindsay van Zundert	Netherlands	158.10	10	58.13	15	99.97
15	Eva-Lotta Kiibus	Estonia	156.95	15	55.26	13	101.69
16	Alexandra Feigin	Bulgaria	155.23	17	54.31	14	100.92
17	Josefin Taljegård	Sweden	154.98	12	55.53	16	99.45
18	Livia Kaiser	Switzerland	151.20	9	60.25	20	90.95
19	Natasha McKay	Great Britain	148.00	20	51.94	19	96.06
20	Anastasia Gozhva	Ukraine	143.69	22	46.78	17	96.91
21	Daša Grm	Slovenia	143.05	19	52.47	21	90.58
22	Mia Caroline Risa Gomez	Norway	137.62	21	49.14	22	88.48
23	Júlia Láng	Hungary	130.28	23	46.33	23	83.95
24	Nikola Rychtařiková	Czech Republic	123.13	24	45.64	24	77.49
Did not advance to free skating
25	Alexandra Michaela Filcová	Slovakia	43.94	25	43.94	—N/a	
26	Léa Serna	France	43.93	26	43.93	—N/a	
27	Antonina Dubinina	Serbia	42.51	27	42.51	—N/a	
28	Anastasia Gracheva	Moldova	39.08	28	39.08	—N/a	
29	Alexandra Mintsidou	Greece	33.86	29	33.86	—N/a	
WD	Meda Variakojytė	Lithuania	withdrew from competition				

=== Pairs ===
Rank	Team	Nation	Total points	SP		FS	
1st place, gold medalist(s)	Sara Conti / Niccolò Macii	Italy	195.13	1	70.45	2	124.68
2nd place, silver medalist(s)	Rebecca Ghilardi / Filippo Ambrosini	Italy	186.96	5	59.48	1	127.48
3rd place, bronze medalist(s)	Annika Hocke / Robert Kunkel	Germany	184.26	2	67.08	3	117.18
4	Alisa Efimova / Ruben Blommaert	Germany	173.66	3	62.77	5	110.89
5	Maria Pavlova / Alexei Sviatchenko	Hungary	172.98	6	57.97	4	115.01
6	Camille Kovalev / Pavel Kovalev	France	169.94	4	62.46	6	107.48
7	Lucrezia Beccari / Matteo Guarise	Italy	152.54	8	53.29	7	99.25
8	Nika Osipova / Dmitry Epstein	Netherlands	148.94	7	54.16	9	94.78
9	Violetta Sierova / Ivan Khobta	Ukraine	143.72	10	47.53	8	96.19
10	Anastasia Vaipan-Law / Luke Digby	Great Britain	137.49	9	49.43	10	88.06
11	Federica Simioli / Alessandro Zarbo	Czech Republic	134.02	11	46.68	11	87.34
12	Sophia Schaller / Livio Mayr	Austria	132.30	12	45.40	12	86.90
13	Greta Crafoord / John Crafoord	Sweden	125.86	13	42.55	13	83.31

=== Ice dance ===
Rank	Team	Nation	Total points	RD		FD	
1st place, gold medalist(s)	Charlène Guignard / Marco Fabbri	Italy	210.44	1	85.53	1	124.91
2nd place, silver medalist(s)	Lilah Fear / Lewis Gibson	Great Britain	207.89	2	84.12	2	123.77
3rd place, bronze medalist(s)	Juulia Turkkila / Matthias Versluis	Finland	198.21	3	77.56	3	120.65
4	Allison Reed / Saulius Ambrulevičius	Lithuania	195.67	4	77.33	4	118.34
5	Evgenia Lopareva / Geoffrey Brissaud	France	191.85	6	76.49	5	115.36
6	Natálie Taschlerová / Filip Taschler	Czech Republic	188.34	5	76.91	6	111.43
7	Loïcia Demougeot / Théo Le Mercier	France	179.96	7	72.55	7	107.41
8	Maria Kazakova / Georgy Reviya	Georgia	175.82	8	68.55	8	107.27
9	Jennifer Janse van Rensburg / Benjamin Steffan	Germany	169.17	9	67.90	10	101.27
10	Mariia Ignateva / Danijil Szemko	Hungary	167.08	10	65.04	9	102.04
11	Victoria Manni / Carlo Röthlisberger	Italy	164.21	11	64.23	11	99.98
12	Mariia Holubtsova / Kyryl Bielobrov	Ukraine	156.99	13	61.00	12	95.99
13	Mariia Nosovitskaya / Mikhail Nosovitskiy	Israel	156.52	12	61.72	13	94.80
14	Anna Šimová / Kirill Aksenov	Slovakia	150.04	15	59.18	14	90.86
15	Mariia Pinchuk / Mykyta Pogorielov	Ukraine	148.37	14	59.36	15	89.01
16	Anastasia Polibina / Pavel Golovishnikov	Poland	138.99	17	54.55	16	84.44
17	Paulina Ramanauskaitė / Deividas Kizala	Lithuania	136.20	16	55.06	17	81.14
18	Samantha Ritter / Daniel Brykalov	Azerbaijan	132.18	19	51.55	18	80.63
19	Hanna Jakucs / Alessio Galli	Netherlands	130.35	18	53.46	19	76.89
20	Aurelija Ipolito / Luke Russell	Latvia	124.88	20	51.41	20	73.47
Did not advance to free dance
21	Arianna Sassi / Luca Morini	Switzerland	49.91	21	49.91	—N/a	
22	Maria Bjorkli / James Koszuta	Norway	47.71	22	47.71	—N/a	
23	Viktoriia Azroian / Artur Gruzdev	Armenia	40.89	23	40.89	—N/a	
