= Niccolò Macii =

Italian pair skater (born 1995)

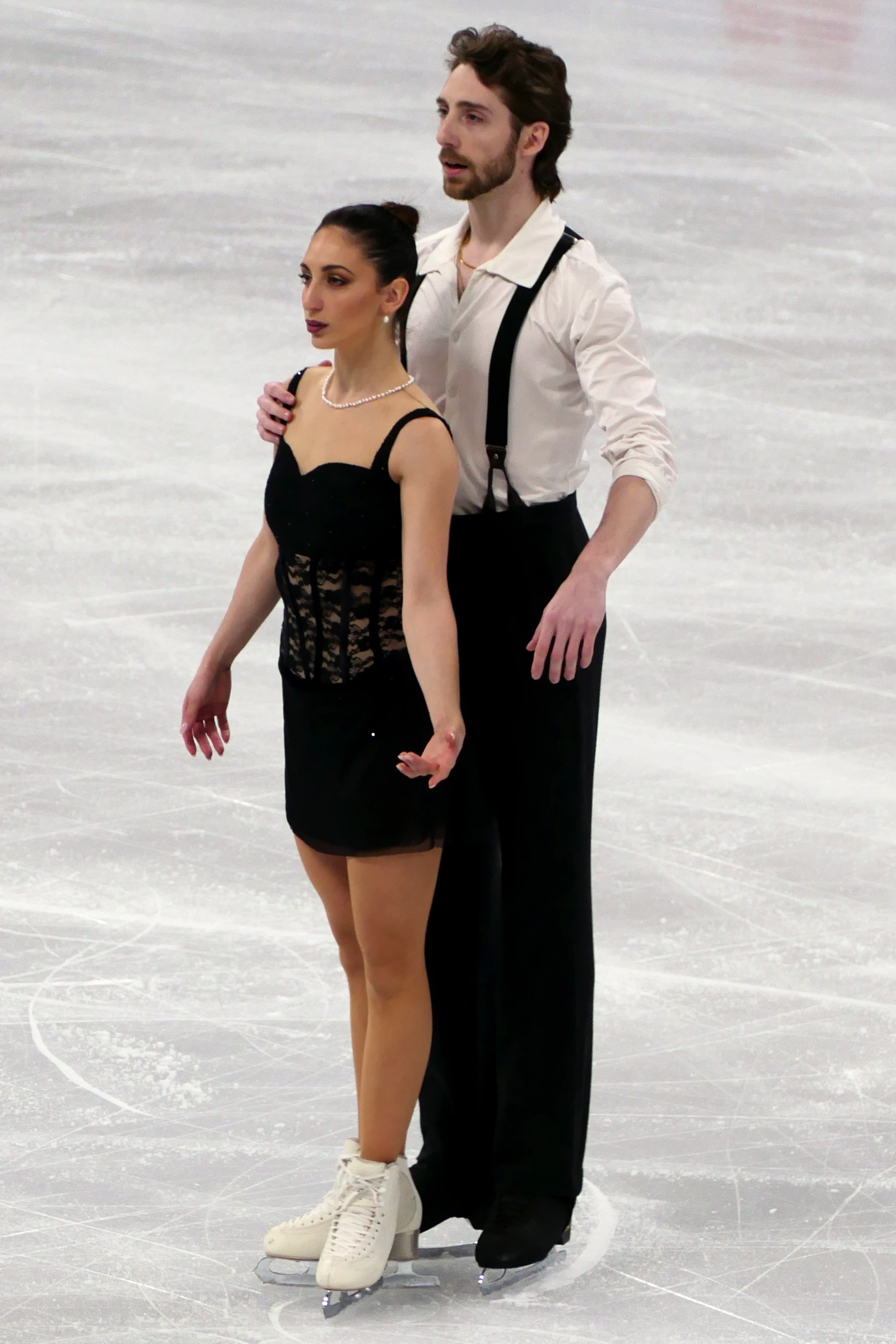
- Sara Conti and Niccolò Macii at the 2024 World Championships

Personal information
- Other names: Nicco
- Born: 18 October 1995 (age 31) Milan, Italy
- Home town: Milan, Italy
- Height: 1.86 m (6 ft 1 in)

Figure skating career
- Country: Italy
- Discipline: Pair skating
- Partner: Sara Conti (2019–26); Anastasiia Revenko (2016–17); Bianca Manacorda (2011–16); Sonia Manfredi (2010–11)
- Coach: Barbara Luoni
- Skating club: IceLab Sesto San Giovanni
- Began skating: 2006
- Retired: May 22, 2026

Medal record
Event	Gold medal – first place	Silver medal – second place	Bronze medal – third place
Olympic Games	0	0	1
World Championships	0	0	2
European Championships	1	1	0
Grand Prix Final	0	2	1
Italian Championships	3	0	4
World Team Trophy	0	0	1
Medal list
Olympic Games
Bronze medal – third place	2026 Milano Cortina	Team
World Championships
Bronze medal – third place	2023 Saitama	Pairs
Bronze medal – third place	2025 Boston	Pairs
European Championships
Gold medal – first place	2023 Espoo	Pairs
Silver medal – second place	2025 Tallinn	Pairs
Grand Prix Final
Silver medal – second place	2023–24 Beijing	Pairs
Silver medal – second place	2025–26 Nagoya	Pairs
Bronze medal – third place	2022–23 Turin	Pairs
Italian Championships
Gold medal – first place	2023 Brunico	Pairs
Gold medal – first place	2025 Varese	Pairs
Gold medal – first place	2026 Begamo	Pairs
Bronze medal – third place	2016 Turin	Pairs
Bronze medal – third place	2020 Bergamo	Pairs
Bronze medal – third place	2021 Egna	Pairs
Bronze medal – third place	2022 Turin	Pairs
World Team Trophy
Bronze medal – third place	2025 Tokyo	Team

Niccolò Macii (born 18 October 1995) is an Italian retired pair skater. With his skating partner, Sara Conti, he is a 2026 Olympic Games team event bronze medalist, a two-time World bronze medalist (2023, 2025), the 2023 European champion, 2025 European silver medalist, a three-time ISU Grand Prix Final medalist, eight-time ISU Grand Prix medalist, and a two-time Italian national champion (2023, 2025–26). They are the first (and as of 2025, only) Italian pair to medal at the World Championships and to win gold at the European Championships.

With his former skating partner, Bianca Manacorda, he won silver at an ISU Challenger Series event, the 2014 Lombardia Trophy. They also competed at three World Junior Championships and a European Championships.

Macii was part of the Italian figure skating team to win a bronze medal at the 2026 Winter Olympics.

== Personal life ==
Macii was born on October 18, 1995, in Milan, Italy.

He began dating his pair partner, Sara Conti, in 2018 before amicably splitting in 2023. In August 2025, he became engaged to his girlfriend, Vanessa Dalla Vedova.

== Career ==
=== Early career ===
Inspired from watching the 2006 Winter Olympics in Turin, Italy, Macii began figure skating that same year at the age of eleven. Macii's first pair partner was Sonia Manfredi.

He ultimately teamed up with Bianca Manacorda prior to the 2011–12 figure skating season.

On the junior level, Manacorda/Macii won the 2014 Bavarian Open as well as the 2014 Italian Junior Championships. They also competed at three World Junior Championships (2012, 2014, 2015), finishing as high as sixth.

On the senior level, Manacorda/Macii won silver at the 2014 CS Lombardia Trophy, bronze at the 2016 Italian Championships, and bronze at the 2016 Bavarian Open. Additionally, they competed at the 2016 European Championships in Bratislava, Slovakia, where they placed twelfth. Their partnership dissolved following the 2015–16 figure skating season.

Following his split with Manacorda, Macii briefly skated pairs with Anastasiia Revenko and Damiana Alessandra Celi, before ultimately teaming up with singles skater, Sara Conti, in 2019.

=== Partnership with Conti ===
==== 2019–20 season ====
Conti/Macii debuted at the 2019 IceLab International Cup, where they placed fifth. They went on to compete at the 2019 CS Warsaw Cup and the 2019 CS Golden Spin of Zagreb, finishing fifteenth and thirteenth, respectively.

At the 2020 Italian Championships, Conti/Macii won the bronze medal. They then finished the season with a sixth-place finish at the 2020 Bavarian Open.

==== 2020–21 season ====
Conti/Macii won their second consecutive bronze medal at the 2021 Italian Championships. They went on to compete at the 2021 International Challenge Cup but they ultimately withdrew after the short program.

==== 2021–22 season ====
Conti/Macii began their season with a fifth-place finish at the 2021 CS Lombardia Trophy. They went on to place tenth at the 2021 CS Nebelhorn Trophy as well as win silver at the 2021 Cup of Nice.

Conti/Macii debuted Grand Prix series at the 2021 Gran Premio d'Italia, where they finished seventh. They then competed at the 2021 CS Warsaw Cup, where they finished seventh.

At the 2022 Italian Championships, Conti/Macii won their third bronze medal. Selected to compete at the 2022 European Championships in Tallinn, Estonia, Conti/Macii placed tenth in the short program and sixth in the free skate, placing seventh overall.

==== 2022–23 season: European champions, World bronze medalists, and Grand Prix Final bronze medalists ====
For the new season, the pair upgraded their twist lift to a triple for the first time. Conti/Macii started their season two appearances on the Challenger circuit, winning a gold medal at the 2022 CS Lombardia Trophy and placing fourth at the 2022 CS Nebelhorn Trophy. They also won gold at the 2022 Tayside Trophy.

Given two assignments on the Grand Prix, Conti/Macii won the bronze medal at 2022 Skate Canada International, their first Grand Prix medal, which he called "like a dream." They finished second in the free skate, and came within 0.30 points of silver medalists Chan/Howe. At their second assignment, the 2022 MK John Wilson Trophy, Conti/Macci won the silver medal despite having to abort their final lift in the free skate. He said afterward "the last lift angers us, because we can do it so easily," while adding they were "happy with our result." These placements ultimately earned them a berth at the 2022–23 Grand Prix Final, held on home ice in Turin. At the Final, Conti/Macii placed fourth in the short program, 2.24 points back of Canadians Stellato-Dudek/Deschamps in third. With a new personal best of 119.72 in the free skate they rose to third overall, taking the bronze medal over the Canadians by less than three points. Macci remarked afterward that "let's say we're still somehow outsiders who are getting almost too many results. But we're extremely happy about this result that we didn't expect it at all."

Shortly after the Final, the duo won their first national title at the 2023 Italian Championships. At the 2023 European Championships in Espoo, Finland, Conti/Macii won the short program and placed second in the free skate, ultimately winning the gold medal. They became the first Italian pair team to ever win a European title. Conti/Macii then went on to compete at the 2023 International Challenge Cup, where they won the gold medal.

At the 2023 World Championships in Saitama, Japan, Conti/Macii placed third in both the short program and free skate, ultimately winning the bronze medal. Conti/Macii became the first Italian pair team to ever medal at a World Championships, which she said made them "very proud of what we were able to achieve in a patriotic kind of way." Conti/Macii then joined Team Italy at the 2023 World Team Trophy, where they placed fourth in the short program and third in the free skate. Team Italy finished fourth overall.

==== 2023–24 season: Grand Prix Final silver medalists ====
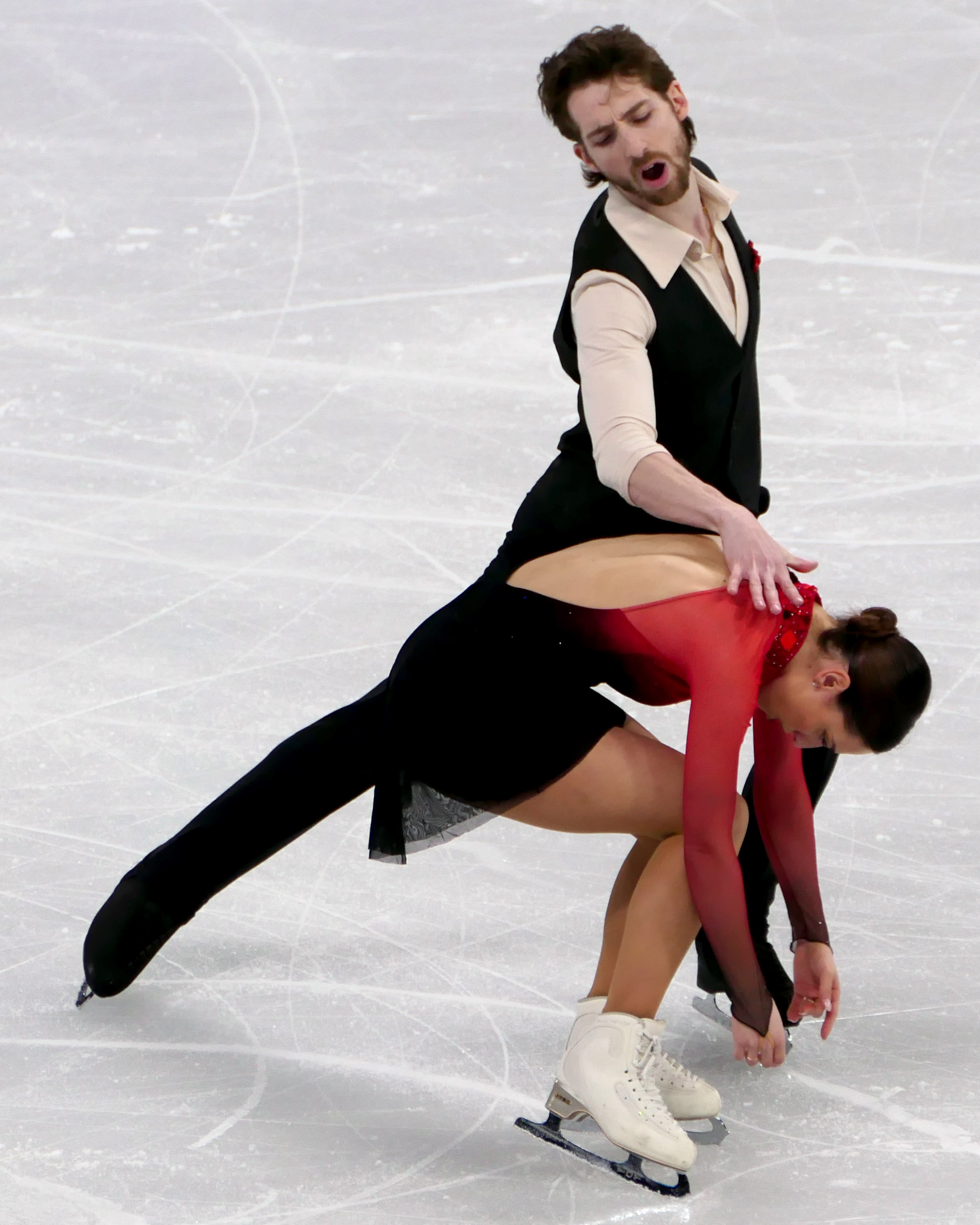
Conti and Macii performing their short program at the 2024 World Championships

During the off-season, Conti/Macii selected the song, "Intermezzo sinfonico," which was Macii's grandparents' wedding song and served as a tribute to his late grandfather, who had died in 2022.

They would begin the season by winning the gold medal at the 2023 CS Lombardia Trophy. On the Grand Prix, they entered the 2023 Grand Prix de France as the title favourites, but placed narrowly second in the short program after Conti stepped out of their throw landing. In the free skate, Conti had another throw stepout, as well as one on her jump sequence attempt. The team placed second in that segment as well, finishing with the silver medal, 5.21 points behind gold medalists Pereira/Michaud of Canada. Conti said afterward that they were "so happy with our free skating," stating "we are a top couple and we have to stay here. We want to improve our program and will be ready for our next Grand Prix. We know we can do much better." At their second event, the 2023 Grand Prix of Espoo, they repeated the short program throw error from France and came second again in the segment. They were third in the free skate after Macii fell on a jump, but remained second overall.

Competing at the 2023–24 Grand Prix Final in Beijing, Conti/Macii skated a clean short program to place third in the segment. They won the free skate, but finished second overall, 0.55 points behind gold medalists Hase/Volodin of Germany. Conti declared of the result that they were "so happy. Finally. Our season starts right now! The two months before were preparation, now we have arrived!"

Conti suffered from a bad flu in the days before the Italian championships, and as a result the team withdrew. They next appeared at the 2024 European Championships, where struggles in both programs saw them come sixth. Conti/Macii next won gold at the International Challenge Cup for the second consecutive year.

Prior to the 2024 World Championships, Conti/Macii made the decision to go back to their "Oblivion (Una sombra más)" short program that they had used the previous three seasons. Going on to compete at those championships in Montreal, Conti/Macii came third in the short program with a clean skate and a season's best score of 72.88. They were 0.65 points back of Japan's Miura/Kihara in second, and 0.78 ahead of Hase/Volodin in fourth. Conti effused that "finally, we had a really good short program!" They struggled with numerous errors in the free skate, coming sixth in that segment and dropping to sixth place overall. Conti called it "disappointing, but it's a competition."

==== 2024–25 season: European silver medalists and World bronze medalists ====
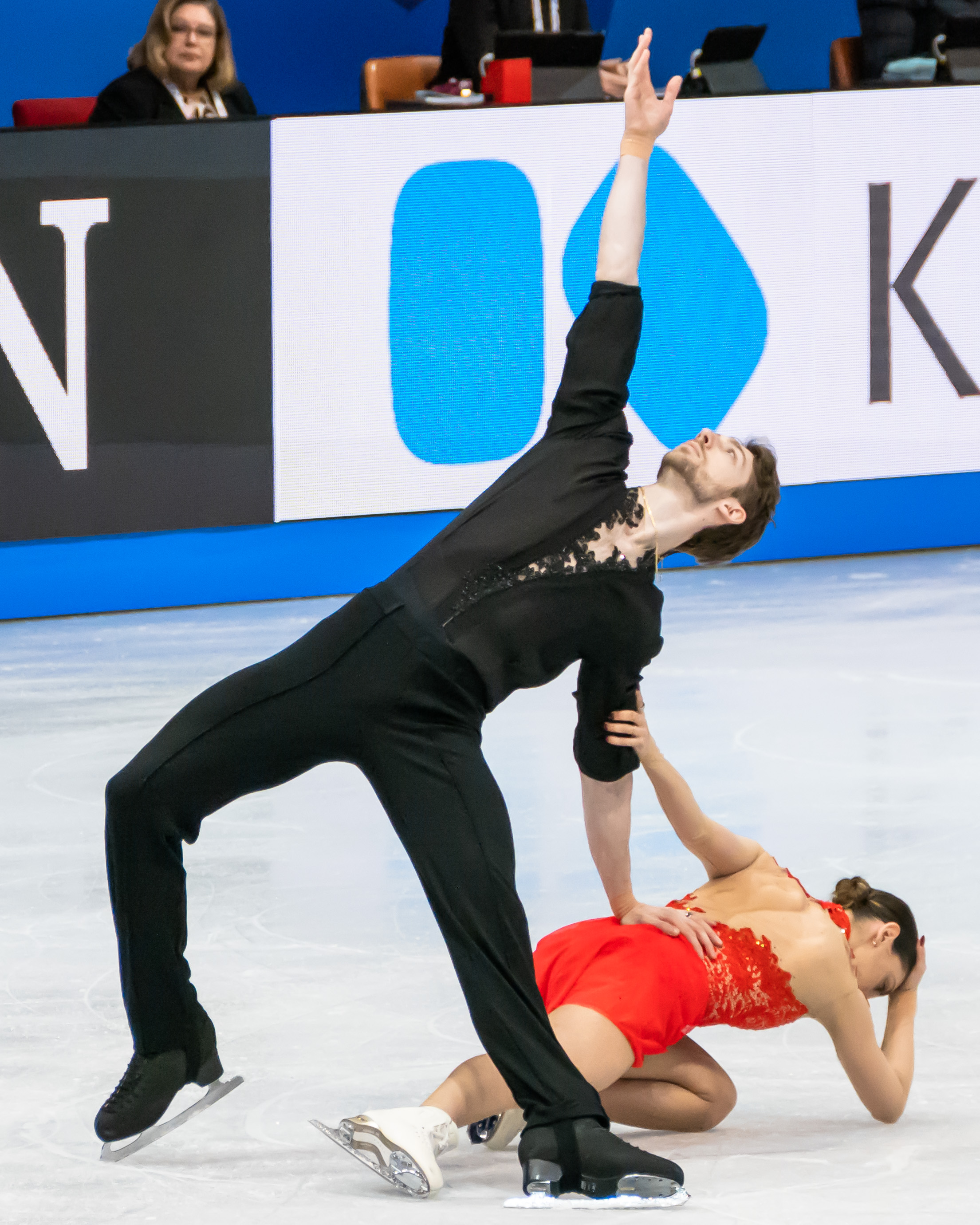
Conti and Macii in the starting pose for their short program at the 2025 World Championships

Going into the season, Conti and Macii selected the song "Papa, Can You Hear Me?" for their free program in dedication of Conti's late father.

They began the season by winning gold at both the 2024 Lombardia Trophy and the 2024 Tayside Trophy. Going on to compete on the 2024–25 Grand Prix circuit, they won the silver medal at the 2024 Grand Prix de France. They shared that they were happy with their first "big" event. “It is a much different silver medal here compared to last season," said Macii. "Last year, we skated poorly and lost the gold. This year it feels like we won the silver.” The team went on to win the gold medal at the 2024 Cup of China. “We’re so excited, this is our first gold medal on the Grand Prix!” said Conti.

Qualifying for the 2024–25 Grand Prix Final in Grenoble, France, the pair finished in fourth place. "The tension was so high because we know we can be on the podium or fall back, but it’s ok, it’s another competition," Conti said later.

At the 2025 Italian Championships, Conti/Macii won their second national title.

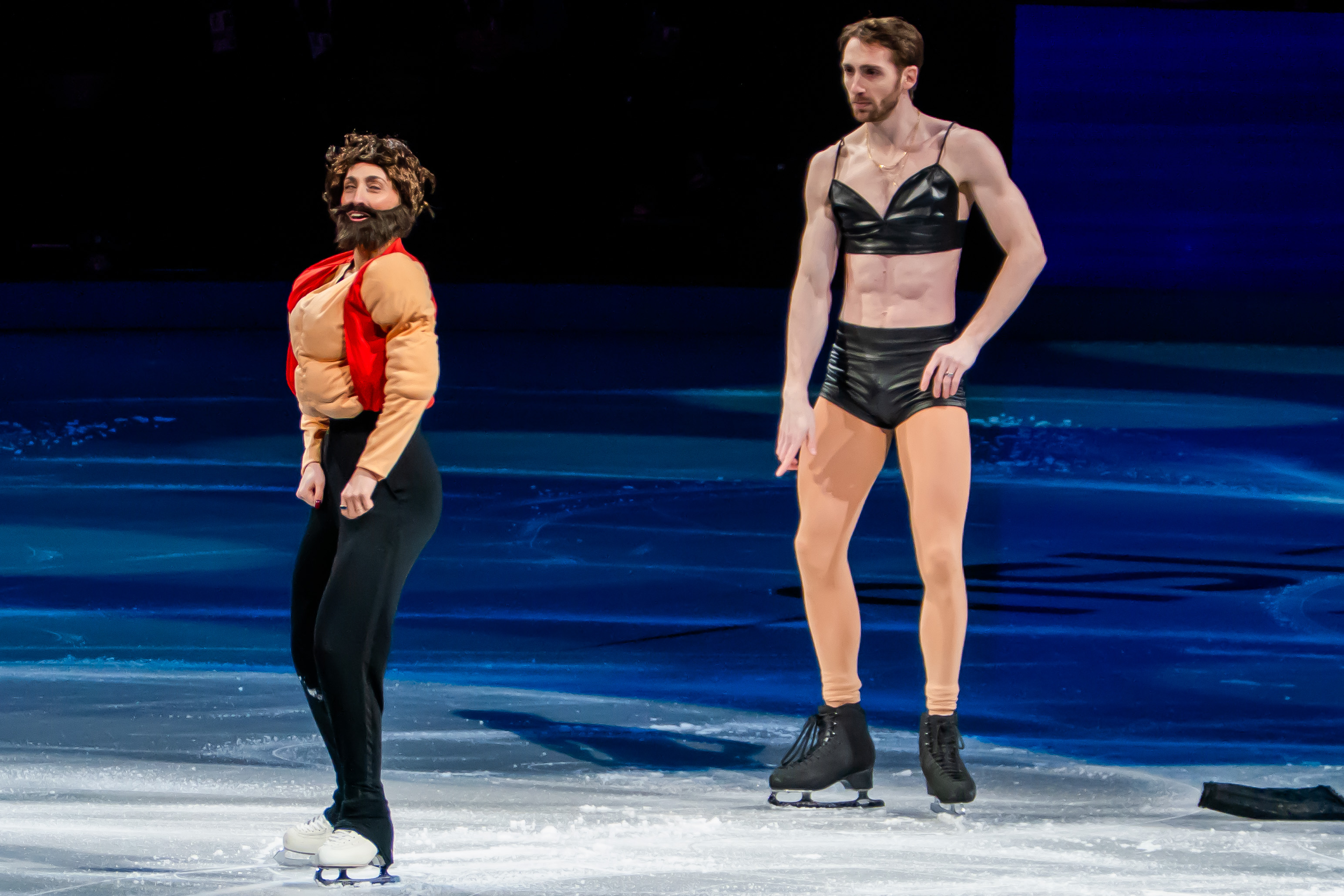
Conti and Macii during their exhibition program at the 2025 World Championships

Going on to compete at the 2025 European Championships in Tallinn, Estonia, Conti/Macii placed second in both the short and free program segments, winning the silver medal overall behind Hase/Volodin. In an interview following the event, Macii shared, "This silver means a lot. Last year’s Europeans were the biggest disappointment of our career, and we wanted to redeem ourselves. The podium was the goal. We knew the other teams were very strong. We are very happy we found our connection again. Last year wasn’t the same because our relationship has changed, but today it felt like two years ago again. We really felt the connection."

The following month, Conti/Macii competed at the 2025 World Championships in Boston, Massachusetts, United States. The pair placed second in the short program and third in the free skate, winning the bronze medal overall behind Miura/Kihara and Hase/Volodin. Delighted with the result, Conti shared in an interview after the event, "We’re so happy to be back on the world’s podium. There were some small mistakes today. It was actually quite hard to go out there today after such an incredible performance like the one from Minerva and Nikita."

Selected to compete for Team Italy at the 2025 World Team Trophy, Conti/Macii placed second in all segments of the pair's event, aiding Team Italy in winning the bronze medal overall. “It’s a beautiful start for the next season,” said Conti. She added that they would be using Italian music for the Olympic season.

==== 2025–26 season: Milano Cortina Olympics and Grand Prix Final silver medalists ====
Conti/Macii opened the season by winning gold at the 2025 Lombardia Trophy and the 2025 Tayside Trophy.

They subsequently competed on the 2025–26 Grand Prix series, winning the silver medal at the 2025 Cup of China. “I think we did a pretty good free skate today,” Macii commented. “It really wasn’t easy skating after the Olympic champions Sui/Han." Two weeks later, Conti/Macii took gold at the 2025 NHK Trophy."It was a very big competition, like tension was so high today," noted Conti after the free skate. "I feel it in all the elements, but I’m happy because every element was a very good fight."

The following month, they competed at the 2025–26 Grand Prix Final, where they scored personal bests in all competition segments and won the silver medal behind Miura/Kihara. "We are really happy!" said Conti after their free skate. "We controlled everything, and I'm so happy that we are really all together on the ice. I feel like we are one person on the ice." Conti/Macii followed this up by winning their third national title at the 2026 Italian Championships and were subsequently named to the 2026 Winter Olympic team.

Following the Italian Championships, Conti sustained a knee injury and as a result, the pair withdrew from the 2026 European Championships. Due to this, Conti had to wear a knee brace upon returning to training and opted to wear one at the 2026 Winter Olympics.

On 6 February, Conti/Macii competed at the 2026 Winter Olympics Figure Skating Team Event where they placed third in the short program. "I can’t really explain what we’re feeling right now," said Conti following their performance. "We’re just so happy that we came here and were able to show what we can do. Most of all, we’re happy to show that we are back." Two days later, Conti/Macii also went on to place third in the free skate segment. Their results, combined with those of their teammates, helped Team Italy win the Olympic bronze medal. One week later, Conti/Macii competed in the individual pairs event where they finished in sixth place overall. "We will remember this for a lifetime," shared Macii following their free skate. "Because we had the biggest emotions here at this event... In life you experience great happiness and great sadness, ups and downs. These two weeks were exactly like that. And maybe the next days will feel more flat. But here, we felt everything. We really felt at home. And I'm really proud of my partner. We had a great journey to get here. And now, we will look to the future."

The following month, it was announced that Conti/Macii would not compete at the 2026 World Championships.

In late May, it was announced that Conti/Macii had parted ways due to Macii deciding to retire from competitive figure skating.

== Programs ==
=== Pair skating with Sara Conti ===
Season	Short program	Free skating	Exhibition
2025–2026	El Toro Salvaje (The Wild Bull) by John Califra; Concerto de España by Benise choreo. by Matteo Zanni	Caruso by Lucio Dalla performed by HAUSER, London Symphony Orchestra, Robert Ziegler, & Lara Fabian; Occhi Verdi by Karl Hugo choreo. by Romain Haguenauer	Macarena by Los del Río; Y.M.C.A. by Village People; Cotton-Eyed Joe by Rednex; Hola (I Say) by Marco Mengoni ft. Tom Walker
2024–2025	Carmen Suites by Georges Bizet; Carmen Suite No. 1: I. Prelude to Act I performed by Leonard Bernstein & New York Philharmonic; Carmen, Suite after Bizet’s Opera: No. IX. Torero; Carmen Suite No. VI Scene by Rodion Shchedrin choreo. by Raffaella Cazzaniga, Matteo Zanni	Papa, Can You Hear Me? (from Yentl) by Michel Legrand performed by Barbra Streisand choreo. by Raffaella Cazzaniga, Matteo Zanni	Perfection (from Black Swan) by Clint Mansell; Run the World (Girls) by Beyoncé; The Prayer by Celine Dion & Andrea Bocelli
2023–2024	Oblivion (Una sombra más) by Astor Piazzolla performed by Mina and Gianni Ferrio choreo. by Raffaella Cazzaniga; Intermezzo sinfonico (from Cavalleria rusticana) by Pietro Mascagni performed by Orchestra of the Teatro alla Scala di Milano & Herbert von Karajan choreo. by Raffaella Cazzaniga	Cinema Paradiso by Ennio Morricone performed by Josh Groban, Katherine Jenkins, Alberto Urso choreo. by Corrado Giordani	Che Bambola by Fred Buscaglione
2022–2023	Oblivion (Una sombra más) by Astor Piazzolla performed by Mina and Gianni Ferrio choreo. by Raffaella Cazzaniga	Cinema Paradiso by Ennio Morricone performed by Josh Groban, Katherine Jenkins, Alberto Urso choreo. by Corrado Giordani	Che Bambola by Fred Buscaglione; Fix You by Coldplay
2021–2022	Oblivion (Una sombra más) by Astor Piazzolla performed by Mina and Gianni Ferrio choreo. by Raffaella Cazzaniga	Billie Jean by Michael Jackson performed by David Cook choreo. by Corrado Giordani	Fix You by Coldplay
2020–2021	Oblivion (Una sombra más) by Astor Piazzolla performed by Mina and Gianni Ferrio choreo. by Raffaella Cazzaniga	This Bitter Earth by Dinah Washington, Max Richter; Experience by Ludovico Einaudi choreo. by Corrado Giordani	
2019–2020	Il Postino Theme by John Williams, Itzhak Perlman, Pittsburg Symphony Orchestra by Astor Piazzolla choreo. by Raffaella Cazzaniga	This Bitter Earth by Dinah Washington, Max Richter; Experience by Ludovico Einaudi choreo. by Corrado Giordani	

=== Pair skating with Bianca Manacorda ===
Season	Short program	Free skating
2015–16	Wild Side by Roberto Cacciapaglia choreo. by Andrea Gilardi	The Godfather by Nino Rota choreo. by Andrea Gilardi
2014–15	The Music of the Night by Andrew Lloyd Webber choreo. by Corrado Giordano	The Godfather by Nino Rota choreo. by Andrea Gilardi
2013–14	Howl's Moving Castle by Joe Hisaishi choreo. by Andrea Gilardi	Micmacs a tire-larigot by Raphael Beau, Max Steiner choreo. by Andrea Gilardi
2012–13	Breakfast at Tiffany's by Henry Mancini choreo. by Marco Perfido	The Circus by Charlie Chaplin, Carl Davis choreo. by Marco Perfido
2011–12	The Bandwagon by Arthur Schwartz choreo. by Marco Perfido	The Circus by Charlie Chaplin, Carl Davis choreo. by Marco Perfido

== Competitive highlights ==
- GP – Event of the ISU Grand Prix Series
- JGP – Event of the ISU Junior Grand Prix Series
- CS – Event of the ISU Challenger Series
- TBD – Assigned
- WD – Withdrew from competition
- Medals at team events are awarded for the team results only. Individual placements at team events are listed in parentheses.

=== Pair skating with Sara Conti ===
Competition placements at senior level
Season	2019–20	2020–21	2021–22	2022–23	2023–24	2024–25	2025–26
Winter Olympics							6th
Winter Olympics (Team event)							3rd
World Championships				3rd	6th	3rd	
European Championships			7th	1st	6th	2nd	
Grand Prix Final				3rd	2nd	4th	2nd
Italian Championships	3rd	3rd	3rd	1st		1st	1st
World Team Trophy				4th (3rd)		3rd (2nd)	
GP Cup of China						1st	2nd
GP Finland					2nd		
GP France					2nd	2nd	
GP Italy			7th				
GP NHK Trophy							1st
GP Skate Canada				3rd			
GP Wilson Trophy				2nd			
CS Golden Spin of Zagreb	13th						
CS Lombardia Trophy			5th	1st	1st	1st	
GP Nebelhorn Trophy			10th	4th			
GP Warsaw Cup	15th		7th				
Bavarian Open	6th						
Challenge Cup		WD		1st	1st		
IceLab Cup	5th						
Lombardia Trophy							1st
Tayside Trophy				1st	1st	1st	1st
Trophée Métropole Nice			2nd				

=== With Manacorda ===
International
Event	11–12	12–13	13–14	14–15	15–16
Europeans					12th
CS Golden Spin					9th
CS Lombardia				2nd	
CS Warsaw Cup					5th
Cup of Nice				4th	
Merano Cup			6th		
International: Junior
Junior Worlds	18th			12th	6th
JGP Belarus			7th		
JGP Croatia		14th		8th	
JGP Estonia			7th	9th	
Bavarian Open	3rd		1st		3rd
DS Cup			1st		
NRW Trophy		5th			
Toruń Cup		4th			
Warsaw Cup	7th	6th			
National
Italian Champ.		2nd J	1st J		3rd
J = Junior level

== Detailed results ==
=== Pair skating with Sara Conti ===
ISU personal best scores in the +5/-5 GOE System
Segment	Type	Score	Event
Total	TSS	223.28	2025–26 Grand Prix Final
Short program	TSS	77.22	2025–26 Grand Prix Final
Short program	TES	42.03	2025–26 Grand Prix Final
Short program	PCS	35.19	2025–26 Grand Prix Final
Free skating	TSS	146.06	2025–26 Grand Prix Final
Free skating	TES	75.86	2025–26 Grand Prix Final
Free skating	PCS	70.68	2025 World Team Trophy

- Small medals for the short program and free skating are only awarded at ISU Championships.
- Medals at team events are awarded for the team results only. Individual placements at team events are listed in parentheses.

Results in the 2019-20 season
Date	Event	SP		FS		Total	
Date	Event	P	Score	P	Score	P	Score
Nov 1-3, 2019	(Italy) 2019 IceLab International Cup	5	41.40	4	88.07	5	129.47
Nov 14–17, 2019	(Poland) 2019 CS Warsaw Cup	16	43.32	15	85.31	15	128.63
Dec 4–7, 2019	(Croatia) 2019 CS Golden Spin of Zagreb	17	45.43	13	90.77	13	136.20
Dec 12–15, 2019	(Italy) 2020 Italian Championships	3	46.61	3	82.99	3	129.60
Feb 3–9, 2020	(Germany) 2020 Bavarian Open	7	49.62	5	93.29	6	142.91

Results in the 2020-21 season
Date	Event	SP		FS		Total	
Date	Event	P	Score	P	Score	P	Score
Dec 12–13, 2020	(Italy) 2021 Italian Championships	2	55.89	3	92.01	3	147.90
Feb 26–28, 2021	(Netherlands) 2021 International Challenge Cup	7	49.28	—N/a	—N/a	WD	—N/a

Results in the 2021-22 season
Date	Event	SP		FS		Total	
Date	Event	P	Score	P	Score	P	Score
Sep 10–12, 2021	(Italy) 2021 CS Lombardia Trophy	4	57.54	6	92.68	5	150.22
Sep 22–25, 2021	(Germany) 2021 CS Nebelhorn Trophy	9	53.96	11	89.48	10	143.44
Oct 20–24, 2021	(France) 2021 Trophée Métropole Nice Côte d'Azur	2	51.53	2	102.03	2	153.56
Nov 5–7, 2021	(Italy) 2021 Gran Premio d'Italia	6	54.55	7	98.17	7	152.72
Nov 17-20, 2021	(Italy) 2021 CS Warsaw Cup	9	59.68	7	108.36	7	168.04
Dec 4–5, 2021	(Italy) 2022 Italian Championships	3	58.95	3	110.41	3	169.36
Jan 10–16, 2022	(Estonia) 2022 European Championships	10	56.28	6	112.62	7	168.90

Results in the 2022-23 season
Date	Event	SP		FS		Total	
Date	Event	P	Score	P	Score	P	Score
Sep 8–10, 2023	(Italy) 2023 Lombardia Trophy	1	62.81	1	107.38	1	170.19
Sep 21–24, 2022	(Germany) 2022 CS Nebelhorn Trophy	4	64.85	4	113.02	4	177.87
Oct 15–16, 2022	(United Kingdom) 2022 Tayside Trophy	1	60.90	1	118.23	1	179.13
Oct 28-30, 2022	2022 Skate Canada International	3	66.66	2	119.52	3	186.18
Nov 11–13, 2022	(Poland) 2022 MK John Wilson Trophy	2	68.69	2	115.50	2	184.19
Dec 8–11, 2022	(Italy) 2022–23 Grand Prix Final	4	67.30	3	119.72	3	187.02
Dec 15–18, 2022	(Italy) 2023 Italian Championships	1	70.76	1	131.99	1	202.75
Jan 25–29, 2023	(Finland) 2023 European Championships	1	70.45	2	124.68	1	195.13
Feb 23–26, 2023	(Netherlands) 2023 International Challenge Cup	1	63.69	1	124.71	1	188.40
Mar 22–26, 2023	(Japan) 2023 World Championships	3	73.24	3	134.84	3	208.08
Apr 13–16, 2023	(Japan) 2023 World Team Trophy	4	69.84	3	130.22	3 (4)	200.06

Results in the 2023-24 season
Date	Event	SP		FS		Total	
Date	Event	P	Score	P	Score	P	Score
Sep 8–10, 2023	(Italy) 2023 CS Lombardia Trophy	1	70.16	1	130.19	1	200.35
Oct 14–15, 2023	(United Kingdom) 2023 Tayside Trophy	1	65.40	1	131.61	1	197.01
Nov 3-5, 2023	2023 Grand Prix de France	2	65.31	2	124.15	2	189.46
Nov 17-19, 2023	(Finland) 2023 Grand Prix of Espoo	2	65.00	2	123.60	2	188.60
Dec 7–10, 2023	(China) 2022–23 Grand Prix Final	3	70.30	1	135.58	2	205.88
Dec 22–23, 2023	(Italy) 2024 Italian Championships	7	61.52	4	125.73	6	187.25
Feb 22–25, 2024	(Netherlands) 2024 International Challenge Cup	1	64.37	1	133.45	1	197.82
Mar 18–24, 2024	(Canada) 2024 World Championships	3	72.88	6	124.46	6	197.34

Results in the 2024–25 season
Date	Event	SP		FS		Total	
Date	Event	P	Score	P	Score	P	Score
Sep 12–15, 2024	(Italy) 2024 CS Lombardia Trophy	1	74.67	2	128.35	1	203.02
Oct 12–13, 2024	(United Kingdom) 2024 Tayside Trophy	1	64.04	1	134.55	1	198.59
Nov 1–3, 2024	2024 Grand Prix de France	2	70.79	2	132.60	2	203.39
Nov 22–24, 2024	2024 Cup of China	1	72.43	2	138.62	1	211.05
Dec 5–8, 2024	(France) 2024–25 Grand Prix Final	4	70.49	4	129.57	4	200.06
Dec 19–21, 2024	(Italy) 2025 Italian Championships	1	76.11	1	145.25	1	221.36
Jan 28 – Feb 2, 2025	(Estonia) 2025 European Championships	2	68.52	2	138.37	2	206.89
Mar 25–30, 2025	(United States) 2025 World Championships	2	74.61	3	135.86	3	210.47
Apr 17–20, 2025	(Japan) 2025 World Team Trophy	2	74.10	2	142.26	3 (2)	216.36

Results in the 2025–26 season
Date	Event	SP		FS		Total	
Date	Event	P	Score	P	Score	P	Score
Sep 11–14, 2025	(Italy) 2025 Lombardia Trophy	1	78.55	1	137.08	1	216.63
Oct 11–12, 2025	(United Kingdom) 2025 Tayside Trophy	1	70.85	1	130.92	1	201.77
Oct 24–26, 2025	2025 Cup of China	2	73.41	2	136.47	2	209.88
Nov 7–9, 2025	(Japan) 2025 NHK Trophy	2	73.69	1	134.89	1	208.58
Dec 4–7, 2025	(Japan) 2025-26 Grand Prix Final	2	77.22	3	146.06	2	223.28
Dec 17–20, 2025	(Italy) 2026 Italian Championships	1	80.89	1	135.20	1	216.09
Feb 6–8, 2026	(Italy) 2026 Winter Olympics – Team event	3	76.65	3	136.61	3	—N/a
Feb 6–19, 2026	(Italy) 2026 Winter Olympics	8	71.70	6	131.49	6	203.19
