= Bianca Manacorda =

Italian pair skater (born 1997)

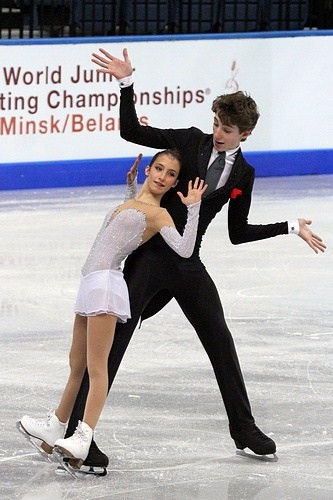
- Bianca Manacorda and Niccolò Macii at the 2012 World Junior Figure Skating Championships

Personal information
- Born: 17 November 1997 (age 28) Milan, Italy
- Height: 1.54 m (5 ft 1/2 in)

Figure skating career
- Country: Italy
- Skating club: IceLab Sesto San Giovanni
- Began skating: 2007

Medal record
Italian Championships
Bronze medal – third place	2016 Turin	Pairs

Bianca Manacorda (born 17 November 1997) is an Italian pair skater. With her former skating partner, Niccolò Macii, she won silver at an ISU Challenger Series event, the 2014 Lombardia Trophy, and placed 12th at the 2016 European Championships in Bratislava, Slovakia. They also competed at three World Junior Championships, achieving their best result, 6th, at the 2016 event in Debrecen, Hungary.

== Programs ==
(with Macii)

Season	Short program	Free skating
2015–16	Wild Side by Roberto Cacciapaglia choreo. by Andrea Gilardi	The Godfather by Nino Rota choreo. by Andrea Gilardi
2014–15	The Music of the Night by Andrew Lloyd Webber choreo. by Corrado Giordano	The Godfather by Nino Rota choreo. by Andrea Gilardi
2013–14	Howl's Moving Castle by Joe Hisaishi choreo. by Andrea Gilardi	Micmacs a tire-larigot by Raphael Beau, Max Steiner choreo. by Andrea Gilardi
2012–13	Breakfast at Tiffany's by Henry Mancini choreo. by Marco Perfido	The Circus by Charlie Chaplin, Carl Davis choreo. by Marco Perfido
2011–12	The Bandwagon by Arthur Schwartz choreo. by Marco Perfido	The Circus by Charlie Chaplin, Carl Davis choreo. by Marco Perfido

== Competitive highlights ==
CS: Challenger Series; JGP: Junior Grand Prix

With Macii

International
Event	11–12	12–13	13–14	14–15	15–16
Europeans					12th
CS Golden Spin					9th
CS Lombardia				2nd	
CS Warsaw Cup					5th
Cup of Nice				4th	
Merano Cup			6th		
International: Junior
Junior Worlds	18th			12th	6th
JGP Belarus			7th		
JGP Croatia		14th		8th	
JGP Estonia			7th	9th	
Bavarian Open	3rd		1st		3rd
DS Cup			1st		
NRW Trophy		5th			
Toruń Cup		4th			
Warsaw Cup	7th	6th			
National
Italian Champ.		2nd J	1st J		3rd
J = Junior level
