= Filip Zalevski =

Ukrainian pair skater

Personal information
- Full name: Filip Zalevski
- Born: 3 January 1984 (age 42) Odesa, Ukrainian SSR
- Height: 1.83 m (6 ft 0 in)

Figure skating career
- Country: Bulgaria
- Partner: Nina Ivanova
- Coach: Dmitri Shkidchenko

Filip Zalevski (born 3 January 1984) is a Ukrainian pair skater. He began representing Bulgaria internationally with Nina Ivanova in 2008. They placed 6th at the 2008 Golden Spin of Zagreb.

He had previously competed representing Ukraine. With former partner Alina Dikhtiar, he is the 2006 Ukrainian silver medalist and 2005 Junior national champion. He had also competed with Julia Cherkashina and Aliona Yarulina, with whom he is the 2000 Ukrainian national bronze medalist.

== Programs ==
=== With Ivanova ===
Season	Short program	Free skating
2009–2010	Nyah (from Mission: Impossible II) by Hans Zimmer	Stardust by Ilan Eshkeri
2008–2009	The House of the Spirits by Hans Zimmer	Stardust by Ilan Eshkeri

=== With Dikhtiar ===
Season	Short program	Free skating
2005–2006	Selection performed by André Rieu	Troy by James Horner
2003–2005	Ukrainian folk music The Ukrainian Symphony Orchestra	Light Cavalry by Franz von Suppé London Symphony Orchestra

== Competitive highlights ==
=== With Ivanova for Bulgaria ===
International
Event	2008–2009	2009–2010
World Championships	23rd	23rd
European Championships	21st	16th
National
Bulgarian Championships	1st	1st

=== With Dikhtiar for Ukraine ===
International
Event	2002–2003	2004–2005	2005–2006
European Championships			13th
Nebelhorn Trophy			12th
International: Junior
World Junior Championships		12th	
JGP Hungary		3rd	
JGP Ukraine		4th	
National
Ukrainian Championships	4th	1st J.	2nd
JGP = Junior Grand Prix; J. = Junior level

=== With Yarulina for Ukraine ===
National
Event	1999–2000
Ukrainian Championships	3rd
