= Clare Seo =

American figure skater (born 2006)

Personal information
- Native name: 서희원 (Korean)
- Other names: Seo Hee-won; Heewon Seo
- Born: October 17, 2006 (age 19) Claremont, California, U.S.
- Home town: Colorado Springs, Colorado, U.S.
- Height: 5 ft 3 in (1.59 m)

Figure skating career
- Country: United States (since 2020); South Korea (2019–20)
- Discipline: Women's singles
- Coach: Eddie Shipstad
- Skating club: Broadmoor Skating Club
- Began skating: 2010

Clare Seo or Seo Hee-won (Korean: 서희원; born October 17, 2006) is an American figure skater. Competing for the United States, she is the 2023 CS Budapest Trophy bronze medalist, 2021 JGP France I bronze medalist, and the 2022 U.S. junior national champion. She has placed within the top ten at two World Junior Championships, finishing sixth in 2022 and eighth in 2023.

Seo is also the 2020 South Korean junior national champion.

== Personal life ==
Seo was born on October 17, 2006, in Claremont, California, to Korean parents who were studying in the United States at the time. The family returned to South Korea when Seo was five years old and remained there until 2020, after which Seo moved back to the U.S. with her mother and her younger sister, Clara. From 2022 to 2025, she attended Cheyenne Mountain High School in Colorado Springs, Colorado. She intends to pursue a career in sports psychology once she retires from competitive skating.

== Career ==
=== Early years ===
Seo began learning to skate in 2010. She won gold in the junior women's event at the 2020 South Korean Championships. She was the junior women's bronze medalist at the 2021 U.S. Championships.

=== 2021–22 season: U.S. junior national champion ===
Seo made her junior international debut on the ISU Junior Grand Prix circuit in August at the 2021 JGP France I, the first of two JGP events held in Courchevel, France. She placed first in the short program, but fell to fourth in the free skate to finish third overall behind compatriot Lindsay Thorngren and Canadian competitor Kaiya Ruiter. At her second JGP assignment, the 2021 JGP Poland held in September, Seo was third in the short program and, again, fourth in the free skate to finish just off the podium in fourth overall.

Seo did not compete again until January, when she won the junior national title at the 2022 U.S. Figure Skating Championships, besting domestic rivals Ava Ziegler, Josephine Lee, and Katie Shen. Due to her placement at junior nationals, Seo was named to the American team for the 2022 World Junior Figure Skating Championships alongside Isabeau Levito and Lindsay Thorngren, both of whom competed at the senior level at nationals.

At Junior Worlds in April, Seo was 10th in the short program, but climbed to fifth in the free skate to finish sixth overall.

=== 2022–23 season ===
Seo opened her season back in Courchevel, France at the 2022 JGP France in late August. She placed fifth in both the short program and free skating segments of the competition, and finished fifth overall. At Seo's second Grand Prix event, 2022 JGP Poland, she finished in eighth place after placing tenth in the short program and ninth in the free skate.

Making her international senior debut at the 2022 CS Ice Challenge, Seo finished sixteenth in the short program after falling on two jump elements, but rebounded with a fourth-place free skate and finished eighth overall. Also competing as a senior, she finished seventh at the 2023 U.S. Championships. She was assigned to the 2023 World Junior Championships in Calgary, where she placed eighth, the highest placement of the three American girls at the event.

=== 2023–24 season ===
Seo began the season with a seventh-place finish at the 2023 Cranberry Cup International, before going on to win the bronze medal at the 2023 CS Budapest Trophy. Invited to make her senior Grand Prix debut at the 2023 Skate America, she came tenth.

At the 2024 U.S. Championships, Seo placed third in the short program but sixth in the free skate, dropping to fifth place overall.

=== 2024–25 season ===
Seo started the season by competing on the 2024–25 ISU Challenger Series, finishing eighth at the 2024 CS Cranberry Cup International and twelfth at the 2024 CS Warsaw Cup.

== Programs ==
Season	Short program	Free skating	Exhibition
2024–25	Batucadas by Mitoka Samba; La Vida Es Un Carnaval Celia Cruz; Samba de Janeiro by Bellini choreo. by Logan Giulietti-Schmitt & Yuka Sato	Lord of the Rings by Howard Shore; Concerning Hobbits performed by L'Orchestra Cinématique; Sound of Shire; Battle of the Pelennor Fields performed by London Philharmonic Orchestra choreo. by Logan Giulietti-Schmitt & Yuka Sato	
2023–24	Simple Gifts by Joseph Brackett; Appalachian Spring: VII. Doppio movimento by Leonard Bernstein choreo. by Catarina Lindgren	Libertango; Oblivion by Astor Piazzolla choreo. by Sonja Hilmer	Let's Get Loud by Jennifer Lopez; Mujer Latina by Thalía
2022–23	Simple Gifts by Joseph Brackett; Appalachian Spring: VII. Doppio movimento by Leonard Bernstein choreo. by Catarina Lindgren; Introduction and Rondo Capriccioso, Op. 18 by Camille Saint-Saëns performed by Min Kym choreo. by Drew Meekins	The Four Seasons by Antonio Vivaldi choreo. by Catarina Lindgren	Let's Get Loud by Jennifer Lopez; Mujer Latina by Thalía
2020–22	Rain, In Your Black Eyes by Ezio Bosso	Jean de Florette by Jean-Claude Petit; Querer (from Alegría)	Let's Get Loud by Jennifer Lopez; Mujer Latina by Thalía

== Competitive highlights ==
- GP – Event of the ISU Grand Prix Series
- JGP – Event of the ISU Junior Grand Prix Series
- CS – Event of the ISU Challenger Series

=== Single skating (for the United States) ===
Competition placements at senior level
Season	2022–23	2023–24	2024–25
U.S. Championships	7th	5th	
GP Skate America		10th	
CS Budapest Trophy		3rd	
CS Cranberry Cup		7th	8th
CS Ice Challenge	8th		
CS Warsaw Cup			12th

Competition placements at junior level
Season	2020–21	2021–22	2022–23
World Junior Championships		6th	8th
U.S. Championships	3rd	1st	
JGP France		3rd	5th
JGP Poland		4th	8th

=== Single skating (for South Korea) ===
Competition placements at junior level
Season	2019–20
South Korean Championships	1st

== Detailed results ==
ISU personal best scores in the +5/-5 GOE System
Segment	Type	Score	Event
Total	TSS	182.81	2022 World Junior Championships
Short program	TSS	63.43	2021 JGP France I
Short program	TES	36.60	2021 JGP France I
Short program	PCS	29.46	2023 CS Budapest Trophy
Free skating	TSS	122.20	2022 World Junior Championships
Free skating	TES	66.83	2022 World Junior Championships
Free skating	PCS	58.34	2023 CS Budapest Trophy

=== Single skating (for the United States) ===
==== Senior level ====
Results in the 2022–23 season
Date	Event	SP		FS		Total	
Date	Event	P	Score	P	Score	P	Score
Nov 9–13, 2022	(Austria) 2022 CS Ice Challenge	16	46.73	4	111.76	8	158.49
Jan 23–29, 2023	(United States) 2023 U.S. Championships	7	61.48	9	114.12	7	175.60

Results in the 2023–24 season
Date	Event	SP		FS		Total	
Date	Event	P	Score	P	Score	P	Score
Aug 9–13, 2023	(United States) 2023 Cranberry Cup International	4	56.48	9	91.99	7	148.47
Oct 13–15, 2023	(Hungary) 2023 CS Budapest Trophy	2	63.55	4	108.59	3	171.94
Oct 20–22, 2023	(United States) 2023 Skate America	11	58.14	10	105.63	10	163.77
Jan 22–28, 2024	(United States) 2024 U.S. Championships	3	67.41	6	120.15	5	187.56

Results in the 2024–25 season
Date	Event	SP		FS		Total	
Date	Event	P	Score	P	Score	P	Score
Aug 8–11, 2024	(United States) 2024 CS Cranberry Cup International	6	56.92	9	90.74	8	147.66
Nov 20–24, 2024	(Poland) 2024 CS Warsaw Cup	10	52.45	11	95.25	12	147.70
Jan 20–26, 2025	(United States) 2025 U.S. Championships						

==== Junior level ====
Results in the 2020–21 season
Date	Event	SP		FS		Total	
Date	Event	P	Score	P	Score	P	Score
Jan 11–21, 2021	(United States) 2021 U.S. Championships (Junior)	3	60.27	3	113.24	3	173.51

Results in the 2021–22 season
Date	Event	SP		FS		Total	
Date	Event	P	Score	P	Score	P	Score
Aug 18–21, 2021	2021 JGP France I	1	63.43	4	111.37	3	174.80
Aug 29 – Sep 2, 2021	2021 JGP Poland	2	62.19	4	112.67	4	174.86
Jan 3–9, 2022	(United States) 2022 U.S. Championships (Junior)	1	67.38	2	118.15	1	185.53
Apr 13–17, 2022	(Estonia) 2022 World Junior Championships	10	60.61	5	122.20	6	182.81

Results in the 2022–23 season
Date	Event	SP		FS		Total	
Date	Event	P	Score	P	Score	P	Score
Aug 24–27, 2022	2022 JGP France	5	54.23	5	114.11	5	168.34
Sep 28 – Oct 1, 2022	2022 JGP Poland I	10	57.23	9	113.10	8	170.33
Feb 27 – Mar 5, 2023	(Canada) 2023 World Junior Championships	9	58.41	9	114.21	8	172.62

=== Single skating (for South Korea) ===
Results in the 2019–20 season
Date	Event	SP		FS		Total	
Date	Event	P	Score	P	Score	P	Score
Jan 3–5, 2020	(South Korea) 2020 South Korean Championships (Junior)	1	54.59	1	102.47	1	157.06
