= Ava Marie Ziegler =

American figure skater (born 2006)

Personal information
- Full name: Ava Marie Ziegler
- Born: February 28, 2006 (age 20) Morristown, New Jersey, United States
- Home town: Dover, New Jersey

Figure skating career
- Country: United States
- Discipline: Women's singles
- Coach: Oleg Makarov; Larisa Selezneva
- Skating club: Skating Club of New York
- Retired: January 8, 2026

Ava Marie Ziegler (born February 28, 2006) is a retired American figure skater. She is the 2023 NHK Trophy champion and 2022 Budapest Trophy champion.

At the junior level, she is the 2021 U.S. junior pewter medalist and 2022 U.S. junior silver medalist.

== Personal life ==
Ziegler was born on February 28, 2006, in Morristown, New Jersey, to parents Ron and Patricia (Mansfield). Her mother is a former competitive figure skater, who finished fifth at the 1995 U.S. Figure Skating Championships, as well as a figure skating coach. She has a younger brother, Ronny. She is a resident of Dover, New Jersey.

Ziegler has a Shepherd-Rottweiler named Duke and a rabbit named Cocoa.

== Career ==
=== Early career ===
As a juvenile, Ziegler won the pewter medal at the 2019 U.S. Championships. On the junior level, she won the bronze medal at the 2021 U. S. Championship Series. She then went on to win the pewter medal at the 2021 U.S. Junior Championships behind Isabeau Levito, Kanon Smith, and Clare Seo.

=== 2021–22 season: Junior international debut & U.S. junior national silver ===
Ziegler made her international junior debut by winning a gold medal at the 2021 Cranberry Cup. She was given two assignments on the 2021–22 Junior Grand Prix series, and placed sixth at the 2021 JGP Slovakia and seventh at the 2021 JGP Slovenia. She reflected afterward that she had made mistakes on the circuit that she attributed to adjusting to the higher level of competition, but added that "I loved being on the ice with people who were better than me because it pushes me to work harder."

At the 2022 U.S. Junior Championships, Ziegler won the silver medal, finishing behind Clare Seo.

=== 2022–23 season: Senior debut & Challenger Series gold ===
Debuting as a senior, Ziegler started her season with a fourth-place finish at the 2022 Philadelphia Summer International. She then made her Challenger series debut at the 2022 CS Budapest Trophy, which she won, scoring a new personal best free skate score in the process.

Ziegler was not initially given any assignments on the ISU Grand Prix, but following the withdrawal of fellow American skater Kate Wang from the 2022 Skate Canada International, she was called up to replace her. Ziegler placed third in the short program, earning a new personal best score, but dropped to fourth place overall after falling twice in the free skate and finishing seventh in the segment. Despite this, she set a new personal best in total score as well. Ziegler then went on to compete at the U.S. Eastern Sectional Championships, where she won the gold medal.

At the 2023 U.S. Championships, Ziegler finished ninth after placing eighth in the short program and tenth in the free skate. She closed her season by winning the bronze medal at the 2023 Coupe du Printemps.

=== 2023–24 season: Grand Prix gold ===
Ziegler began the season by winning the silver medal at the 2023 Cranberry Cup International, behind training mate Lindsay Thorngren. She said afterward that she was "super happy with my skates" at the event, adding that there "are things that I can improve throughout the season, but the overall, the competition was successful." Appearing on the Challenger circuit at the 2023 CS Lombardia Trophy, she came sixth, before finishing fifth at the 2023 CS Finlandia Trophy.

For the second consecutive season, Ziegler did not initially receive a Grand Prix assignment, but was invited to attend the 2023 NHK Trophy following the withdrawal of German skater Nicole Schott. She placed fifth in the short program after receiving an incorrect edge call on her triple Lutz and an underrotation call on the back half of her jump combination, but won the free skate after landing seven triple jumps, the only error being another call on her Lutz edge. Ziegler's free skate carried her into first place, overtaking Thorngren by less than two points for the gold medal. She set a new American women’s record for fewest appearances needed before winning a Grand Prix, having done so in her second appearance. She became the second American woman to win the NHK Trophy after Gracie Gold who won in 2014. Ziegler said of the result that "this is the moment I do this sport for!"

In advance of the 2024 U.S. Championships, Ziegler was preemptively named to the American delegation to the 2024 Four Continents Championships, which were to be held in Shanghai the week after the national championships. Shortly afterward, Ziegler announced that she was withdrawing from the national championship in favour of focusing on preparations for the Four Continents Championships, saying in a statement that "this was a difficult decision, however her team believes it in her best interest with both major competitions so close together." She would later reveal that "some health issues" after NHK Trophy had necessitated the choice.

At the Four Continents Championships, Ziegler came third in the short program, 1.03 points in front of Japan's Rinka Watanabe in fourth. Her only technical error was a call for an incorrect edge on her triple Lutz. She won a bronze small medal for the segment, and said she felt "really honored and enjoy being here." In the free skate both of her triple Lutzes received edge calls, and she put a foot down on the latter attempt, coming fourth in the free skate. She finished fourth overall, 1.02 points behind Watanabe, who overtook her for the bronze medal.

=== 2024–25 season: Injury struggles ===
Ziegler was selected to compete at 2024 Skate Canada International and the 2024 Cup of China. In August, she was forced to withdraw in order to undergo surgery for a hip injury she had sustained during the previous season.

=== 2025–26 season: Return to competition, struggles, and retirement ===
Ziegler returned to competition in late September at the 2025 CS Nepela Memorial, where she finished in sixteenth place. She followed this up by placing tenth at the 2025 CS Trialeti Trophy.

In November, Ziegler competed at the 2026 Eastern Sectional Singles Final, placing second. As a result, Ziegler qualified for the 2026 U.S. Championships; however she subsequently withdrew from the event.

On January 8, she announced her retirement from competitive skating due to being unable to get back to the level she needed because of repeated injury.

== Programs ==
Season	Short program	Free skating	Exhibition
2020–21	The Feeling Begins by Peter Gabriel	Never Enough (from The Greatest Showman) by Loren Allred	
2021–22	I'll Take Care of You performed by Beth Hart and Joe Bonamassa choreo. by Anna Zadorozhniuk	Gravity by Sara Bareilles choreo. by Nikolai Morozov	
2022–23	Rebirth by Hi-Finesse, feat. Natacha Atlas choreo. by Anna Zadorozhniuk	Love in the Dark by Adele choreo. by Nikolai Morozov	Something's Got a Hold on Me; Lady Marmalade; Ain't No Other Man by Christina Aguilera
2023–24	Jazz Man by Beth Hart choreo. by Jamie Isley	Liberation; Bound to You (from Burlesque) by Christina Aguilera choreo. by Nikolai Morozov	Not My Responsibility; Oxytocin by Billie Eilish
2025–26	It's a Man's Man's Man's World by James Brown performed by Raye choreo. by Nikolai Morozov, Anna Zadorozhniuk, Jamie Isley	Not About Angels; Strange Birds by Birdy choreo. by Nikolai Morozov, Anna Zadorozhniuk, Jamie Isley	

== Competitive highlights ==
- GP – Event of the ISU Grand Prix Series
- JGP – Event of the ISU Junior Grand Prix Series
- CS – Event of the ISU Challenger Series

Competition placements at senior level
Season	2022–23	2023–24	2025–26
Four Continents Championships		4th	
U.S. Championships	9th		
GP NHK Trophy		1st	
GP Skate Canada	4th		
CS Budapest Trophy	1st		
CS Finlandia Trophy		5th	
CS Golden Spin of Zagreb			11th
CS Lombardia Trophy		6th	
CS Nepela Memorial			16th
CS Trialeti Trophy			10th
Coupe du Printemps	3rd		
Cranberry Cup		2nd	
Philadelphia Summer	4th		
Santa Claus Cup			6th

Competition placements at junior level
Season	2020–21	2021–22
U.S. Championships	4th	2nd
JGP Slovakia		6th
JGP Slovenia		7th
Cranberry Cup		1st

== Detailed results ==
ISU personal best scores in the +5/-5 GOE System
Segment	Type	Score	Event
Total	TSS	201.19	2024 Four Continents Championships
Short program	TSS	68.25	2024 Four Continents Championships
Short program	TES	36.71	2024 Four Continents Championships
Short program	PCS	31.54	2024 Four Continents Championships
Free skating	TSS	138.46	2023 NHK Trophy
Free skating	TES	74.97	2023 NHK Trophy
Free skating	PCS	65.23	2024 Four Continents Championships

- Small medals for the short program and free skating are only awarded at ISU Championships.

=== Senior level ===
Results in the 2022–23 season
Date	Event	SP		FS		Total	
Date	Event	P	Score	P	Score	P	Score
Aug 3–7, 2022	(United States) 2022 Philadelphia Summer International	6	46.66	4	99.60	4	146.26
Oct 13–16, 2022	(Hungary) 2022 CS Budapest Trophy	4	55.59	1	130.24	1	185.83
Oct 28–30, 2022	2022 Skate Canada International	3	66.49	7	120.27	4	186.76
Jan 23–29, 2023	(United States) 2023 U.S. Championships	8	61.09	10	106.61	9	167.70
Mar 17–19, 2023	(Luxembourg) 2023 Coupe du Printemps	3	57.10	2	116.74	3	173.84

Results in the 2023–24 season
Date	Event	SP		FS		Total	
Date	Event	P	Score	P	Score	P	Score
Aug 9–13, 2023	(United States) 2023 Cranberry Cup International	1	68.12	2	115.67	2	183.79
Sep 8–10, 2023	(Italy) 2023 CS Lombardia Trophy	5	60.26	10	97.13	6	157.39
Oct 4–8, 2023	(Finland) 2023 CS Finlandia Trophy	2	65.07	6	108.53	5	173.60
Nov 24–26, 2023	(Japan) 2023 NHK Trophy	5	62.04	1	138.46	1	200.50
Jan 30 – Feb 4, 2024	(China) 2024 Four Continents Championships	3	68.25	4	132.94	4	201.19

Results in the 2025–26 season
Date	Event	SP		FS		Total	
Date	Event	P	Score	P	Score	P	Score
Sep 25–27, 2025	(Slovakia) 2025 CS Nepela Memorial	10	55.80	18	84.47	16	140.27
Oct 8–11, 2025	(Georgia (country)) 2025 CS Trialeti Trophy	16	49.22	8	112.26	10	161.48
Nov 26–30, 2025	(Hungary) 2025 Santa Claus Cup	6	49.73	5	96.18	6	145.91
Dec 3–6, 2025	(Croatia) 2025 CS Golden Spin of Zagreb	12	51.83	13	99.15	11	150.98

=== Junior level ===
Results in the 2020–21 season
Date	Event	SP		FS		Total	
Date	Event	P	Score	P	Score	P	Score
Jan 11–21, 2021	(United States) 2021 U.S. Championships (Junior)	8	53.73	4	107.04	4	160.77

Results in the 2021–22 season
Date	Event	SP		FS		Total	
Date	Event	P	Score	P	Score	P	Score
Sep 1–4, 2021	2021 JGP Slovakia	6	60.03	6	116.26	6	176.29
Sep 22–25, 2021	2021 JGP Slovenia	6	59.62	7	115.25	7	174.87
Oct 11–15, 2021	(United States) 2021 Cranberry Cup International	3	49.46	1	107.97	1	157.43
Jan 3–9, 2022	(United States) 2022 U.S. Championships (Junior)	4	60.24	3	115.26	2	175.50
