= Joseph Klein (figure skater) =

American figure skater

Personal information
- Born: September 30, 2004 (age 22) Chicago, Illinois, U.S.
- Home town: Northbrook, Illinois, U.S.
- Height: 5 ft 4 in (1.62 m)

Figure skating career
- Country: United States
- Discipline: Men's singles
- Coach: Agata Czyzewski; Valeria Masarsky; Damon Allen; Tammy Gambill
- Skating club: Skokie Valley Skating Club
- Began skating: 2008

Joseph Klein (born September 30, 2004) is an American figure skater. He is a member of the Skokie Valley Skating Club. Klein is the 2024 Philadelphia Summer Championship bronze medalist and also the 2021 U.S. Championship silver medalist at the junior level.

== Personal life ==
Joseph Klein was born on September 30, 2004, in Chicago, Illinois. He began skating at age four because his sister was skating and he wanted to try it. As a child, he trained at the same rink in Chicago as Jason Brown, whom he has cited as a role model.

== Competitive highlights ==
- JGP – Event of the ISU Junior Grand Prix Series
- CS – Event of the ISU Challenger Series
- TBD – Assigned
- WD – Withdrew from competition

Competition placements at senior level
Season	2022–23	2023–24	2024–25
U.S. Championships	13th	17th	17th
CS Trophée Métropole Nice			6th
Cranberry Cup	5th	13th	
Philadelphia Summer			3rd

Competition placements at junior level
Season	2019–20	2020–21	2021–22	2022–23
U.S. Championships	13th	2nd	4th	
JGP Poland				9th
JGP United States	7th			

== Detailed results ==
ISU personal best scores in the +5/-5 GOE System
Segment	Type	Score	Event
Total	TSS	210.79	2024 CS Trophée Métropole Nice Côte d'Azur
Short program	TSS	70.13	2022 JGP Poland
Short program	TES	36.25	2024 CS Trophée Métropole Nice Côte d'Azur
Short program	PCS	36.37	2022 JGP Poland
Free skating	TSS	140.90	2024 CS Trophée Métropole Nice Côte d'Azur
Free skating	TES	67.17	2024 CS Trophée Métropole Nice Côte d'Azur
Free skating	PCS	73.73	2024 CS Trophée Métropole Nice Côte d'Azur

=== Senior level ===
Results in the 2022–23 season
Date	Event	SP		FS		Total	
Date	Event	P	Score	P	Score	P	Score
Aug 10–14, 2022	(United States) 2022 Cranberry Cup International	7	62.26	4	126.36	5	188.62
Jan 23–29, 2023	(United States) 2023 U.S. Championships	18	58.38	11	136.49	13	194.87

Results in the 2023–24 season
Date	Event	SP		FS		Total	
Date	Event	P	Score	P	Score	P	Score
Aug 10–13, 2023	(United States) 2023 Cranberry Cup International	11	63.95	12	113.85	13	177.80
Jan 22–28, 2024	(United States) 2024 U.S. Championships	13	68.33	17	103.68	17	172.01

Results in the 2024–25 season
Date	Event	SP		FS		Total	
Date	Event	P	Score	P	Score	P	Score
Jul 31 –Aug 4, 2024	(United States) 2024 Philadelphia Summer Championships	1	79.23	5	123.65	3	202.88
Oct 16–20, 2024	(France) 2024 CS Trophée Métropole Nice Côte d'Azur	8	69.89	6	140.90	6	210.79
Jan 20–26, 2025	(United States) 2025 U.S. Championships	16	60.05	16	123.68	17	183.73

=== Junior level ===
Results in the 2019–20 season
Date	Event	SP		FS		Total	
Date	Event	P	Score	P	Score	P	Score
Aug 28–31, 2019	2019 JGP United States	4	66.52	8	116.36	7	182.88
Jan 21–26, 2020	(United States) 2020 U.S. Championships (Junior)	15	55.83	13	100.15	13	155.98

Results in the 2020–21 season
Date	Event	SP		FS		Total	
Date	Event	P	Score	P	Score	P	Score
Jan 11–21, 2021	(United States) 2021 U.S. Championships (Junior)	4	63.60	2	123.70	2	187.30

Results in the 2021–22 season
Date	Event	SP		FS		Total	
Date	Event	P	Score	P	Score	P	Score
Jan 4–9, 2022	(United States) 2022 U.S. Championships (Junior)	5	63.71	4	113.26	4	176.97

Results in the 2022–23 season
Date	Event	SP		FS		Total	
Date	Event	P	Score	P	Score	P	Score
Sep 28 – Oct 1, 2022	2022 JGP Poland	2	70.13	11	117.37	9	187.50
