= 2021 U.S. Figure Skating Championships =

Figure skating competition

- Type: National championship
- Date: January 11 – 21
- Season: 2020–21
- Location: Las Vegas, Nevada
- Host: U.S. Figure Skating
- Venue: Orleans Arena

Champions
- Men's singles: Nathan Chen (Senior) & Eric Prober (Junior)
- Women's singles: Bradie Tennell (Senior) & Isabeau Levito (Junior)
- Pairs: Alexa Scimeca Knierim and Brandon Frazier (Senior) & Anastasiia Smirnova and Danil Siianytsia (Junior)
- Ice dance: Madison Hubbell and Zachary Donohue (Senior) & Katarina Wolfkostin and Jeffrey Chen (Junior)
- Previous: 2020 U.S. Championships
- Next: 2022 U.S. Championships

The 2021 U.S. Figure Skating Championships were held from January 11–21, 2021, at the Orleans Arena in Las Vegas, Nevada. Medals were awarded in men's singles, women's singles, pair skating, and ice dance at the senior and junior levels. The results were part of the U.S. selection criteria for the 2021 World Championships. It would also have been part of the selection criteria for the 2021 World Junior Championships and the 2021 Four Continents Championship, but both events were cancelled.

San Jose, which previously hosted the event in 1996, 2012, and 2018, was announced as the original host in October 2019. On November 9, 2020, U.S. Figure Skating announced that, in light of the COVID-19 pandemic in the United States, the event would be moved to Las Vegas, Nevada. After the success of 2020 Skate America's bubble environment in the same arena, USFSA implemented the same structure for the 2021 U.S. Championships. Las Vegas had never hosted the event prior to this year. San Jose was awarded the right to host the 2023 U.S. Championships.

No audience was allowed to be present at the event.

== Qualifying ==
During the 2020–21 season, the traditional qualification system was replaced with the Championship Series due to the impact of the COVID-19 pandemic. The 2021 U.S. Championship Series took place in a virtual format from November 10 through December 6. The top scorers from the series in junior and senior men's singles, women's singles, and pair skating, as well as junior ice dance, advanced to the 2021 U.S. Championships. All senior ice dance teams who registered for the in-person qualifying season also advanced to the championships.

== Entries ==
U.S. Figure Skating published a list of entries on December 22, 2020.

=== Changes to preliminary entries ===
Date	Discipline	Withdrew	Added	Notes	Ref.
December 10	Senior pairs	Tarah Kayne; Daniel O'Shea	—N/a	Split	
December 28	Senior ice dance	Adrienne Carhart; Ivan Gurianov	—N/a	Split	
January 5	Senior men	Andrew Torgashev	—N/a	Injury recovery	
January 10	Senior pairs	Sarah Burden; Matthew Rounis	—N/a	COVID-19 exposure	
January 10	Senior pairs	Winter Deardorff; Mikhail Johnson	—N/a	COVID-19 exposure	
January 10	Senior pairs	Brynne McIsaac; Mark Sadusky	—N/a	COVID-19 exposure	
January 10	Senior ice dance	Christina Carreira; Anthony Ponomarenko	—N/a	COVID-19 exposure	
January 12	Senior women	Paige Rydberg	—N/a	Positive COVID-19 test	
January 17	Junior ice dance	Katarina Wolfkostin; Jeffrey Chen	—N/a	Torn ACL (Chen)	
January 18	Junior ice dance	—N/a	Katarina Wolfkostin; Jeffrey Chen	Re-added following further medical consultation	

== Schedule ==
Due to the bubble environment, the Orleans Arena hosted all practices and competitions. Senior events were held from January 12–17 and junior events from January 19–21. Additionally, due to the bubble environment, there were specific entry and departure dates for each of the senior disciplines, with all junior-level skaters arriving on January 18.

Date	Discipline	Time	Event
January 14	Senior pairs	2:58 pm	Short program
January 14	Senior women	6:12 pm	Short program
January 15	Senior ice dance	12:58 pm	Rhythm dance
January 15	Senior women	6:12 pm	Free skate
January 16	Senior men	12:11 pm	Short program
January 16	Senior pairs	4:01 pm	Free skate (group 1)
January 16	Senior ice dance	4:58 pm	Free dance (group 1)
January 16	Senior pairs	5:55 pm	Free skate (groups 2 & 3)
January 16	Senior ice dance	7:28 pm	Free dance (groups 2 & 3)
January 17	Senior men	12:55 pm	Free skate
January 17	—N/a	5:01 pm	Skating Spectacular
January 20	Junior pairs	12:55 pm	Short program
January 20	Junior women	3:00 pm	Short program
January 20	Junior ice dance	4:59 pm	Rhythm dance
January 20	Junior men	7:00 pm	Short program
January 21	Junior pairs	12:55 pm	Free skate
January 21	Junior women	3:00 pm	Free skate
January 21	Junior ice dance	4:59 pm	Free dance
January 21	Junior men	6:56 pm	Free skate

== Medal summary ==
=== Senior ===
Discipline	Gold	Silver	Bronze	Pewter
Men	Nathan Chen	Vincent Zhou	Jason Brown	Yaroslav Paniot
Women	Bradie Tennell	Amber Glenn	Karen Chen	Alysa Liu
Pairs	Alexa Scimeca Knierim; Brandon Frazier	Jessica Calalang; Brian Johnson	Ashley Cain-Gribble; Timothy LeDuc	Audrey Lu; Misha Mitrofanov
Ice dance	Madison Hubbell; Zachary Donohue	Madison Chock; Evan Bates	Kaitlin Hawayek; Jean-Luc Baker	Caroline Green; Michael Parsons

=== Junior ===
Discipline	Gold	Silver	Bronze	Pewter
Men	Eric Prober	Joseph Klein	Samuel Mindra	Jacob Sanchez
Women	Isabeau Levito	Kanon Smith	Clare Seo	Ava Marie Ziegler
Pairs	Anastasiia Smirnova; Danil Siianytsia	Isabelle Martins; Ryan Bedard	Valentina Plazas; Maximiliano Fernandez	Catherine Rivers; Timmy Chapman
Ice dance	Katarina Wolfkostin; Jeffrey Chen	Oona Brown; Gage Brown	Katarina DelCamp; Ian Somerville	Isabella Flores; Dimitry Tsarevski

== Senior results ==
=== Men's singles ===
Men's results
Rank	Skater	Total	SP		FS	
1st place, gold medalist(s)	Nathan Chen	322.28	1	113.92	1	208.36
2nd place, silver medalist(s)	Vincent Zhou	291.38	2	107.79	2	183.59
3rd place, bronze medalist(s)	Jason Brown	276.92	3	100.92	4	176.00
4	Yaroslav Paniot	266.97	4	83.74	3	183.23
5	Maxim Naumov	244.20	5	83.53	5	160.67
6	Jimmy Ma	230.78	6	82.30	8	148.48
7	Tomoki Hiwatashi	230.14	9	75.51	6	154.63
8	Camden Pulkinen	220.10	8	80.08	9	140.02
9	Eric Sjoberg	213.39	11	74.01	10	139.38
10	Dinh Tran	210.79	10	74.03	11	136.76
11	Alexei Krasnozhon	206.76	16	54.53	7	152.23
12	Joseph Kang	203.45	7	79.30	14	124.15
13	Joonsoo Kim	197.12	13	69.04	12	128.08
14	Ryan Dunk	192.66	14	65.60	13	127.06
15	Jordan Moeller	191.33	12	71.09	15	120.24
16	Peter Liu	171.18	15	56.92	16	114.26
17	Mitchell Friess	163.07	17	48.88	17	114.19

=== Women's singles ===
Women's results
Rank	Skater	Total	SP		FS	
1st place, gold medalist(s)	Bradie Tennell	232.61	1	79.40	1	153.21
2nd place, silver medalist(s)	Amber Glenn	215.33	5	70.83	2	144.50
3rd place, bronze medalist(s)	Karen Chen	214.98	4	70.99	3	143.99
4	Alysa Liu	213.39	2	76.36	4	137.03
5	Mariah Bell	199.95	3	72.37	5	127.58
6	Lindsay Thorngren	178.89	6	62.54	7	116.35
7	Audrey Shin	176.82	10	57.74	6	119.08
8	Gabriella Izzo	171.76	7	62.32	9	109.44
9	Rena Ikenishi	169.89	8	60.14	8	109.75
10	Pooja Kalyan	157.46	9	58.29	12	99.17
11	Finley Hawk	152.84	14	52.08	11	100.76
12	Starr Andrews	152.13	17	45.93	10	106.20
13	Gracie Gold	149.05	12	53.88	13	95.17
14	Emilia Murdock	138.80	15	51.25	14	87.55
15	Violeta Ushakova	136.26	16	49.76	15	86.50
16	Heidi Munger	136.05	13	52.11	16	83.94
17	Hanna Harrell	130.72	11	56.93	17	73.79

=== Pairs ===
Pairs' results
Rank	Team	Total	SP		FS	
1st place, gold medalist(s)	Alexa Scimeca Knierim; Brandon Frazier	228.10	1	77.46	1	150.64
2nd place, silver medalist(s)	Jessica Calalang; Brian Johnson	205.29	2	71.30	3	133.99
3rd place, bronze medalist(s)	Ashley Cain-Gribble; Timothy LeDuc	200.52	4	65.81	2	134.71
4	Audrey Lu; Misha Mitrofanov	197.97	3	69.56	4	128.41
5	Emily Chan; Spencer Akira Howe	177.06	5	60.41	5	116.65
6	Olivia Serafini; Mervin Tran	169.88	6	59.23	6	110.65
7	Katie McBeath; Nathan Bartholomay	163.73	7	58.23	7	105.50
8	Laiken Lockley; Keenan Prochnow	145.24	9	45.34	8	99.90
9	Evelyn Grace Hanns; Jim Garbutt	140.93	8	47.98	9	92.95

=== Ice dance ===
Ice dance results
Rank	Team	Total	RD		FD	
1st place, gold medalist(s)	Madison Hubbell; Zachary Donohue	224.56	2	89.66	1	134.90
2nd place, silver medalist(s)	Madison Chock; Evan Bates	222.93	1	90.10	2	132.83
3rd place, bronze medalist(s)	Kaitlin Hawayek; Jean-Luc Baker	212.55	3	85.28	3	127.27
4	Caroline Green; Michael Parsons	192.39	4	80.10	4	112.29
5	Molly Cesanek; Yehor Yehorov	177.40	5	71.11	5	106.29
6	Lorraine McNamara; Anton Spiridonov	162.86	6	65.87	6	96.99
7	Eva Pate; Logan Bye	154.93	7	64.37	7	90.56
8	Livvy Shilling; Alexander Petrov	131.10	8	53.81	8	77.29
9	Hilary Asher; Ryan O'Donnell	122.68	9	51.38	9	71.30
10	Breelie Taylor; Tyler Vollmer	100.76	10	39.40	10	61.36
11	Cara Murphy; Joshua Levitt	96.91	11	36.62	11	60.29

== Junior results ==
=== Men's singles ===
Men's results
Rank	Skater	Total	SP		FS	
1st place, gold medalist(s)	Eric Prober	192.83	3	65.04	1	127.79
2nd place, silver medalist(s)	Joseph Klein	187.30	4	63.60	2	123.70
3rd place, bronze medalist(s)	Samuel Mindra	181.49	8	60.37	3	121.12
4	Jacob Sanchez	177.55	1	66.91	6	110.64
5	Daniel Martynov	176.45	6	62.06	5	114.39
6	Lucas Broussard	175.49	12	55.06	4	120.43
7	Matthew Nielsen	172.30	5	62.31	7	109.99
8	Michael Xie	163.84	11	57.89	8	105.95
9	Liam Kapeikis	162.89	9	58.37	9	104.52
10	Robert Yampolsky	160.85	7	61.60	10	99.25
11	Nicholas Hsieh	152.99	10	57.93	11	95.06
12	Maxim Zharkov	141.27	2	65.51	12	75.76

=== Women's singles ===
Women's results
Rank	Skater	Total	SP		FS	
1st place, gold medalist(s)	Isabeau Levito	187.48	1	65.66	2	121.82
2nd place, silver medalist(s)	Kanon Smith	185.88	2	62.52	1	123.36
3rd place, bronze medalist(s)	Clare Seo	173.51	3	60.27	3	113.24
4	Ava Marie Ziegler	160.77	8	53.73	4	107.04
5	Elsa Cheng	158.85	7	53.75	5	105.10
6	Kate Wang	158.01	4	58.28	6	99.73
7	Adele Zheng	149.89	6	55.83	10	94.06
8	Mia Kalin	149.65	10	51.92	8	97.73
9	Jessica Lin	147.57	11	51.55	9	96.02
10	Abigail Ross	143.89	9	53.35	11	90.54
11	Tamnhi Huynh	140.17	5	57.94	12	82.23
12	Maryn Pierce	138.92	12	41.05	7	97.87

=== Pairs ===
Pairs' results
Rank	Team	Total	SP		FS	
1st place, gold medalist(s)	Anastasiia Smirnova; Danil Siianytsia	169.85	1	59.07	1	110.78
2nd place, silver medalist(s)	Isabelle Martins; Ryan Bedard	148.02	2	52.14	2	95.88
3rd place, bronze medalist(s)	Valentina Plazas; Maximiliano Fernandez	137.29	4	47.07	3	90.22
4	Catherine Rivers; Timmy Chapman	134.01	5	45.97	4	88.04
5	Sydney Cooke; Keyton Bearinger	131.39	3	48.61	5	82.78
6	Aleksandra Prudsky; Daniel Tioumentsev	119.38	6	43.31	6	76.07
7	Haley Conrad; Kristofer Ogren	97.32	8	34.54	7	62.78
8	Juliette Reed; Jordan Gillette	94.74	7	35.17	8	59.57

=== Ice dance ===
Ice dance results
Rank	Team	Total	RD		FD	
1st place, gold medalist(s)	Katarina Wolfkostin; Jeffrey Chen	167.22	1	68.81	1	98.41
2nd place, silver medalist(s)	Oona Brown; Gage Brown	162.91	2	66.20	2	96.71
3rd place, bronze medalist(s)	Katarina DelCamp; Ian Somerville	147.30	3	60.26	3	87.04
4	Isabella Flores; Dimitry Tsarevski	146.40	4	59.98	4	86.42
5	Angela Ling; Caleb Wein	140.47	5	56.27	5	84.20
6	Leah Neset; Artem Markelov	128.02	6	50.76	6	77.26
7	Elizabeth Tkachenko; Alexei Kiliakov	124.55	7	48.33	7	76.22
8	Elliana Peal; Ethan Peal	109.73	9	43.71	8	66.02
9	Vanessa Pham; Jonathan Rogers	109.66	8	44.58	9	65.08
10	Gracie Vainik; Daniel Brykalov	104.07	10	40.99	10	63.08

== Controversy ==
U.S. Figure Skating maintained strict COVID-19 protocols within the bubble, including asking skaters to don a mask immediately after leaving the ice, but appeared to apply inconsistent requirements to skaters who had come into contact with positive cases prior to the event. After three senior pairs teams training under the same coach came into contact with a COVID-positive case, they voluntarily chose to withdraw out of precaution, whereas senior ice dance team Christina Carreira / Anthony Ponomarenko appeared to be asked to withdraw by the federation. However, Carreira/Ponomarenko's rinkmates and coaches were able to attend the competition, despite Carreira/Ponomarenko having come into contact with the positive case at their training rink. In addition, coach Tom Zakrajsek was unable to travel to the event due to contracting COVID-19 in early January and one of his students, Paige Rydberg, also tested positive upon arrival in Las Vegas; despite this, no contact tracing protocols were enacted, with the remaining athletes from Zakrajsek's training group and rink being allowed to compete.

== International team selections ==
=== World Championships ===
The World Championships were held from March 22–28 in Stockholm, Sweden. U.S. Figure Skating announced the women's team on January 16 and the men's, pairs, and ice dance teams on January 17.

No.	Men	Women	Pairs	Ice dance
1	Jason Brown	Karen Chen	Jessica Calalang; Brian Johnson; (withdrew)	Madison Chock; Evan Bates
2	Nathan Chen	Bradie Tennell	Alexa Scimeca Knierim; Brandon Frazier	Kaitlin Hawayek; Jean-Luc Baker
3	Vincent Zhou	—N/a		Madison Hubbell; Zachary Donohue

Alternates

No.	Men	Women	Pairs	Ice dance
1	Tomoki Hiwatashi	Amber Glenn	Ashley Cain-Gribble; Timothy LeDuc; (called up)	Christina Carreira; Anthony Ponomarenko
2	~~Maxim Naumov~~	Mariah Bell	Audrey Lu; Misha Mitrofanov	Caroline Green; Michael Parsons
3	Camden Pulkinen	Audrey Shin	Emily Chan; Spencer Akira Howe	Molly Cesanek; Yehor Yehorov
4	Jimmy Ma	—N/a	Olivia Serafini; Mervin Tran	—N/a

=== Four Continents Championships ===
The 2021 Four Continents Championships, originally scheduled to be held from February 9–14 in Sydney, Australia, were cancelled.

=== World Junior Championships ===
The 2021 World Junior Championships were scheduled to be held from March 1–7 in Harbin, China, but were cancelled.
