= Yaroslav Paniot =

Ukrainian-American figure skater

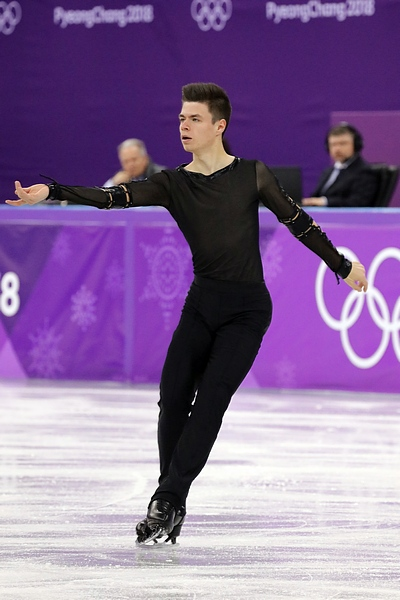
- Paniot at the 2018 Winter Olympics

Personal information
- Native name: Ярослав Вадимович Паніот
- Full name: Yaroslav Vadymovych Paniot
- Born: 26 December 1997 (age 28) Odesa, Ukraine
- Home town: Irvine, California, United States
- Height: 1.83 m (6 ft 0 in)

Figure skating career
- Country: United States (since 2019); Ukraine (2011–19)
- Coach: Todd Eldredge
- Skating club: All Year Figure Skating Club
- Began skating: 2004
- Retired: July 15, 2025

Medal record
Representing Ukraine
Ukrainian Championships
Gold medal – first place	2015 Kyiv	Singles
Gold medal – first place	2018 Kyiv	Singles
Silver medal – second place	2016 Kyiv	Singles
Silver medal – second place	2017 Kyiv	Singles
Winter Youth Olympics
Silver medal – second place	2012 Innsbruck	Team

Yaroslav Vadymovych Paniot (Ukrainian: Ярослав Вадимович Паніот, born 26 December 1997) is a retired Ukrainian-American figure skater. He is the 2021 U.S. national pewter medalist.

Representing Ukraine, he is the 2017 CS Tallinn Trophy bronze medalist, the 2017 Philadelphia International silver medalist, and a two-time Ukrainian national champion (2014, 2017). He has reached the free skate at four ISU Championships and qualified a spot for Ukraine at the 2018 Winter Olympics, where he finished 30th. He last competed for Ukraine in November 2018.

== Career ==
=== Early career ===
Paniot began skating in 2003. In his early years, he was taught by Yuriy Sukholentsev and Oleksandr Zelensky in Ukraine. From 2009 to 2011, he was coached by Alexei Tchetverukhin in Russia.

In January 2012, Paniot won silver in the team event at the Winter Youth Olympics in Innsbruck, Austria. He debuted on the ISU Junior Grand Prix (JGP) series the following season, in late August 2012. In February 2013, Paniot took silver at the European Youth Olympic Winter Festival in Poiana Brașov, Romania. He trained mainly in Kyiv until 2014.

=== 2014–2015 season: ISU Championship debut ===
During the season, Paniot trained mainly in Irvine, California, coached by Viacheslav Zagorodniuk. Competing in the 2014 JGP series, he finished 17th in Aichi, Japan, having dropped from 7th after the short program, and won the bronze medal in Dresden, Germany, after placing fourth in the short and third in the free skate. Making his senior international debut, he finished 12th at the Warsaw Cup, an ISU Challenger Series event. In December, Paniot won the Ukrainian senior national title; ranked first in the short program and second in the free skate, he finished ahead of silver medalist Ivan Pavlov by less than half a point.

Paniot was selected to compete at two senior-level ISU Championships and reached the free skate at both. In January, he finished 16th at the 2015 European Championships in Stockholm, Sweden, having ranked 14th in the short program and 18th in the free skate. In March, he placed 20th in the short, 24th in the free, and 24th overall at the 2015 World Championships in Shanghai, China.

=== 2015–2016 season ===
Paniot finished second to Pavlov at the Ukrainian Championships in December 2015. He changed coaches in January 2016, joining Nikolai Morozov a week before the Ukrainian Junior Championships. In March, he competed at the 2016 World Junior Championships in Debrecen, Hungary and qualified for the free skate by placing 15th in the short. He was 8th in the free skate and 11th overall.

=== 2016–2017 season ===
Competing in the 2016 JGP series, Paniot placed 5th in Saint Gervais-les-Bains and Dresden. He ranked 12th at the 2016 CS Golden Spin of Zagreb. At the Ukrainian Championships, he placed first in the short and second in the free, finishing second to Pavlov by a margin of 0.87.

Ahead of the 2017 World Junior Championships, Paniot trained under Halyna Kukhar and Anton Kovalevski in Ukraine. At Junior Worlds in Taipei (Taiwan), Paniot finished in 10th place after scoring personal bests in every portion of the competition.

=== 2017–2018 season ===
In early August, Paniot received the silver medal at the Philadelphia Summer International, having finished second to Timothy Dolensky and ahead of Max Aaron. In mid-September, he placed fourth at the 2017 CS U.S. International Classic. At the end of the month, he competed at the 2017 CS Nebelhorn Trophy, the final qualifying opportunity for the 2018 Winter Olympics. By placing 7th, he earned a spot for Ukraine in the men's event at the Olympics.

Paniot won bronze at the 2017 CS Tallinn Trophy and then won his second senior national title. In February 2018, he competed at the 2018 Winter Olympics in PyeongChang, South Korea. He was eliminated after placing 30th in the short program.

=== 2018–2019 season ===
Paniot placed eighth at the 2018 CS U.S. International Figure Skating Classic. In November, he made his Grand Prix debut, placing 12th at the 2018 NHK Trophy. It was his final international appearance for Ukraine.

=== 2019–2020 season ===
Paniot competed at the 2020 Southwest Regionals, finishing third in the short and second in the free to come in second overall and qualify for Sectionals. At the 2020 Pacific Coast Sectionals, he was first after the short and third in the free, coming in second overall, only .88 behind the winner, Joonsoo Kim. This qualified him for Nationals. In his US Nationals debut, Paniot finished ninth in the short and tenth in the free, to place tenth overall at the 2020 U.S. Championships.

=== 2020–2021 season ===
Paniot competed in the virtual Championship Series, placing second in his group and second overall behind Eric Sjoberg. This qualified him for his second consecutive national championship. Competing at the 2021 U.S. Championships, he placed fourth in the short program with a clean skate. In the free program, he landed three quads and placed third in that segment, remaining in fourth place overall and taking the pewter medal.

In an interview following the national championships, Paniot said he would be released from the Ukrainian federation on May 21, 2021, and would be eligible to compete for the United States the following season. He also said he expected to receive American citizenship in late 2021, making him eligible to compete at the 2022 Winter Olympics in Beijing.

=== 2021–2022 season ===
In early June, Paniot was officially added to the USFSA's International Selection Pool roster. Paniot was fourth at the Skating Club of Boston's Cranberry Cup, a small international competition. Paniot was named as the host pick for the 2021 Skate America in September. He was slated to compete at the 2021 CS Lombardia Trophy but withdrew during the short program due to boot issues. He later withdrew from Skate America as well.

Paniot placed seventh in the short program at the 2022 U.S. Championships but had to withdraw from the free skate after suffering another problem with his boots.

== Programs ==
Season	Short program	Free skating
2023–2024	Kiss by Prince choreo. by Rohene Ward	We Will Rock You; Bohemian Rhapsody; Don't Stop Me Now by Queen choreo. by Benjamin Agosto, Katherine Hill
2021–2022	Boogie Shoes by KC and the Sunshine Band; You Should Be Dancing by Bee Gees choreo. by Misha Ge	Heartbreak Hotel; Can't Help Falling in Love; Hound Dog performed by Elvis Presley choreo. by Misha Ge
2020–2021	Sway performed by Michael Bublé	Heartbreak Hotel; Can't Help Falling in Love; Hound Dog performed by Elvis Presley choreo. by Misha Ge
2019–2020	Sway performed by Michael Bublé	The Godfather Finale by Nino Rota; Childhood Memories by Gheorghe Zamfir; The Godfather Waltz (from The Godfather) by Nino Rota
2018–2019	Romeo and Juliet Overture by Pyotr Ilyich Tchaikovsky	The Messiah Will Come Again performed by Gary Moore
2017–2018	Romeo and Juliet Overture by Pyotr Ilyich Tchaikovsky	The Four Seasons by Antonio Vivaldi
2016–2017	Romeo and Juliet Overture by Pyotr Ilyich Tchaikovsky	Falling Away With You by Muse; Gladiator by Hans Zimmer, Lisa Gerrard
2015–2016	Melodrama by Andrea Bocelli; Maybe I, Maybe You by Scorpions	Interview with the Vampire by Elliot Goldenthal
2014–2015	Moonlight Electric by Cello (based on Moonlight Sonata by Ludwig van Beethoven)	Adagio by Remo Giazotto, Tomaso Albinoni; Palladio both performed by Escala
2013–2014	Swing and Jazz	Boléro by Maurice Ravel
2012–2013	Masquerade: Waltz by Aram Khachaturian	Mix

== Competitive highlights ==
- GP – Event of the ISU Grand Prix Series
- JGP – Event of the ISU Junior Grand Prix Series
- CS – Event of the ISU Challenger Series
- WD – Withdrew from competition

=== Single skating (for the United States) ===
Competition placements at senior level
Season	2019–20	2020–21	2021–22	2022–23	2023–24	2024–25
U.S. Championships	10th	4th	WD	7th	7th	
CS Cranberry Cup			4th			8th
Kings Cup					2nd	
Tayside Trophy						9th

=== Single skating (for Ukraine) ===
Competition placements at senior level
Season	2012–13	2013–14	2014–15	2015–16	2016–17	2017–18	2018–19
Winter Olympics						30th	
World Championships			24th				
European Championships			16th			25th	
Ukrainian Championships	4th	5th	1st	2nd	2nd	1st	
GP NHK Trophy							12th
CS Golden Spin of Zagreb					12th		
CS Nebelhorn Trophy						7th	
CS Tallinn Trophy						3rd	
CS U.S. Classic				WD		4th	8th
CS Warsaw Cup			12th	8th			
Philadelphia Summer						2nd	5th
Ukrainian Open		5th					

Competition placements at junior level
Season	2011–12	2012–13	2013–14	2014–15	2015–16	2016–17
Winter Youth Olympics	9th					
Winter Youth Olympics (Team event)	2nd					
World Junior Championships					11th	10th
Ukrainian Championships	2nd	3rd			1st	2nd
JGP Belarus			11th			
JGP France						5th
JGP Germany				3rd		5th
JGP Japan				17th		
JGP Slovenia		18th				
JGP United States		16th			4th	
Cup of Nice	7th	8th				
European Youth Olympic Festival		2nd				

== Detailed results ==
ISU personal best scores in the +5/-5 GOE System
Segment	Type	Score	Event
Total	TSS	173.64	2018 NHK Trophy
Short program	TSS	74.97	2018 CS U.S. International Classic
Short program	TES	39.82	2018 CS U.S. International Classic
Short program	PCS	35.15	2018 CS U.S. International Classic
Free skating	TSS	105.05	2018 NHK Trophy
Free skating	TES	42.33	2018 NHK Trophy
Free skating	PCS	64.72	2018 NHK Trophy

ISU personal best scores in the +3/-3 GOE System
Segment	Type	Score	Event
Total	TSS	233.16	2017 CS U.S. International Classic
Short program	TSS	81.25	2017 CS Tallinn Trophy
Short program	TES	45.70	2017 CS Tallinn Trophy
Short program	PCS	35.55	2017 CS Tallinn Trophy
Free skating	TSS	155.96	2017 CS U.S. International Classic
Free skating	TES	86.46	2017 CS U.S. International Classic
Free skating	PCS	70.50	2017 CS U.S. International Classic

- At national events in the United States, pewter medals are awarded for fourth place.

=== Single skating (for the United States) ===
Results in the 2024–25 season
Date	Event	SP		FS		Total	
Date	Event	P	Score	P	Score	P	Score
Aug 8–11, 2024	(United States) 2024 CS Cranberry Cup International	10	69.78	7	136.81	8	206.59
Oct 12–13, 2024	(United Kingdom) 2024 Tayside Trophy	7	56.17	9	87.90	9	144.07
