= 2022 U.S. Figure Skating Championships =

Figure skating competition

- Type: National championship
- Date: January 3 – 9
- Season: 2021–22
- Location: Nashville, Tennessee
- Host: U.S. Figure Skating
- Venue: Bridgestone Arena

Champions
- Men's singles: Nathan Chen (Senior) & Kai Kovar (Junior)
- Women's singles: Mariah Bell (Senior) & Clare Seo (Junior)
- Pairs: Ashley Cain-Gribble and Timothy LeDuc (Senior) & Sonia Baram and Daniel Tioumentsev (Junior)
- Ice dance: Madison Chock and Evan Bates (Senior) & Leah Neset and Artem Markelov (Junior)
- Previous: 2021 U.S. Championships
- Next: 2023 U.S. Championships

The 2022 U.S. Figure Skating Championships was held January 3–9, 2022, at the Bridgestone Arena in Nashville, Tennessee. Medals were awarded in men's singles, women's singles, pair skating, and ice dance at the senior and junior levels. The results were part of the U.S. selection criteria for the 2022 World Championships, 2022 World Junior Championships, the 2022 Four Continents Championship, and the 2022 Winter Olympics.

Nashville was announced as the host city in October 2019. It had previously hosted the event in 1997.

== Qualifying ==
U.S. Figure Skating announced that due to ongoing COVID-19 pandemic, the Championship Series announced the previous year would be used again.

=== U.S. Figure Skating Championship Series ===
The Championship Series consisted of eight events held in October and November 2021. Skaters selected up to two competitions and then advanced to Nationals or the High Performance Development Team based on their highest score, rather than their placement.

==== Schedule ====
The Championship Series consisted of the following competitions:

| Date | Disc. | Location | Results |
|---|---|---|---|
| October 4–10, 2021 | M/W/D | Blaine, Minnesota | Details |
| October 12–16, 2021 | M/W/P | Henderson, Nevada | Details |
| October 13–17, 2021 | M/W | Allen, Texas | Details |
| October 27–30, 2021 | M/W | Leesburg, Virginia | Details |
| November 2–5, 2021 | M/W | Fort Wayne, Indiana | Details |
| November 9–13, 2021 | M/W/P | Norwood, Massachusetts | Details |
| November 16–20, 2021 | M/W/D | Alpharetta, Georgia | Details |
| November 17–20, 2021 | M/W | Spokane, Washington | Details |

=== Advancement to Nationals ===
More information on advancement to Nationals was announced after a webinar on June 30.

If the maximum number of competitors isn't reached through byes, additional spots will be available at the Championship Series. Competitors from the Championship Series will be selected on the next best total combined score. If the number of athletes with three international competitions from the approved competition list exceeds the number of available byes (4 for senior singles, 3 for senior pairs, and 5 for senior ice dance, 3 for all junior disciplines), byes will be awarded based on highest to lowest total score in the following order of importance:

- ISU Grand Prix of Figure Skating
- ISU Junior Grand Prix
- ISU Challenger Series

There will be a minimum required score for all athletes to compete to be decided in fall of 2021. Approved international competitions applicable for byes are the Grand Prix Series, Junior Grand Prix Series, Challenger Series, and Junior and Senior Grand Prix Final.

==== Seniors ====
===== Singles =====
Singles skaters can advance to Nationals in the following ways:

- Qualifying for the same event at the ISU Grand Prix of Figure Skating Final or the ISU Junior Grand Prix of Figure Skating Final
- Top 5 finish at the 2021 Toyota U.S. Figure Skating Championships
- 2021 U.S. Figure Skating World Team Members (not including alternates)
- Medalists in the singles event at the most recent Olympic Winter Games
- Athletes who are assigned to and compete at three international assignments classified as an ISU Grand Prix, ISU Junior Grand Prix, and or ISU Challenger Series event
- The top two total combined scores from each section in the U.S. Figure Skating Championship Series
- The next best top three scores from the nation in the U.S. Figure Skating Championship Series.

There will be a maximum of 18 spots.

===== Pairs =====
Pairs can advance to Nationals in the following ways:

- Qualifying for the same event at the ISU Grand Prix of Figure Skating Final or the ISU Junior Grand Prix of Figure Skating Final
- Top 5 finish at the 2021 Toyota U.S. Figure Skating
- 2021 U.S. Figure Skating World Team Members (not including alternates)
- Medalists in the pairs event at the most recent Olympic Winter Games
- Athletes who are assigned to and compete at three international assignments classified as an ISU Grand Prix, ISU Junior Grand Prix, and or ISU Challenger Series event
- The top four total combined scores from the nation in the U.S. Figure Skating Championships Series

There will be a maximum of 12 spots.

===== Ice dance =====
Ice dance teams can advance to Nationals in the following ways:

- Qualifying for the same event at the ISU Grand Prix of Figure Skating Final or the ISU Junior Grand Prix of Figure Skating Final
- Top 5 finish at the 2021 Toyota U.S. Figure Skating
- 2021 U.S. Figure Skating World Team Members (not including alternates)
- Medalists in the ice dance event at the most recent Olympic Winter Games
- Athletes who are assigned to and compete at three international assignments classified as an ISU Grand Prix, ISU Junior Grand Prix, and or ISU Challenger Series event
- The top five total combined scores from the nation in the U.S. Figure Skating Championships Series

There will be a maximum of 15 spots.

==== Juniors ====
===== Singles =====
Singles skaters can advance to Nationals in the following ways:

- Qualifying for the same event at the ISU Junior Grand Prix of Figure Skating Final
- Athletes who are assigned to and compete at three international assignments classified as an ISU Junior Grand Prix, and or ISU Challenger Series event
- The top three total combined scores from each section in the U.S. Figure Skating Championship Series
- The next best top three scores from the nation in the U.S. Figure Skating Championship Series
- The top three total combined novice scores from the nation in the U.S. Figure Skating Championship Series

There will be a maximum of 18 spots.

===== Pairs =====
Pairs can advance to Nationals in the following ways:

- Qualifying for the same event at the ISU Junior Grand Prix of Figure Skating Final
- Athletes who are assigned to and compete at three international assignments classified as an ISU Junior Grand Prix, and or ISU Challenger Series event
- The top nine total combined scores from each section in the U.S. Figure Skating Championship Series

There will be a maximum of 12 spots.

===== Ice dance =====
Ice dance teams can advance to Nationals in the following ways:

- Qualifying for the same event at the ISU Junior Grand Prix of Figure Skating Final
- Athletes who are assigned to and compete at three international assignments classified as an ISU Junior Grand Prix, and or ISU Challenger Series event
- The top twelve total combined scores from each section in the U.S. Figure Skating Championship Series

There will be a maximum of 15 spots.

== Entries ==
U.S. Figure Skating published the official list of preliminary entries on November 29, 2021.

=== Senior ===
| Men | Women | Pairs | Ice dance |
|---|---|---|---|
| Jason Brown | Starr Andrews | Ashley Cain-Gribble; Timothy LeDuc | Emily Bratti; Ian Somerville |
| Nathan Chen | Mariah Bell | Jessica Calalang; Brian Johnson | Christina Carreira; Anthony Ponomarenko |
| Artur Dmitriev | Karen Chen | Emily Chan; Spencer Akira Howe | Molly Cesanek; Yehor Yehorov |
| Ryan Dunk | Amber Glenn | Sydney Cooke; Keyton Bearinger | Madison Chock; Evan Bates |
| Mitchell Friess | Gracie Gold | Kate Finster; Matej Silecky | Cayla Cottrell; Uladzislau Palkhouski |
| William Hubbart | Hanna Harrell | Alexa Knierim; Brandon Frazier | Caroline Green; Michael Parsons |
| Liam Kapeikis | Jill Heiner | Audrey Lu; Misha Mitrofanov | Kaitlin Hawayek; Jean-Luc Baker |
| Jimmy Ma | Rena Ikenishi | Katie McBeath; Nathan Bartholomay | Madison Hubbell; Zachary Donohue |
| Ilia Malinin | Gabriella Izzo | Valentina Plazas; Maximiliano Fernandez | Raffaella Koncius; Alexey Shchepetov |
| Yaroslav Paniot | Isabeau Levito | —N/a | Lorraine McNamara; Anton Spiridonov |
| Sebastien Payannet | Alysa Liu | —N/a | Cara Murphy; Joshau Levitt |
| Camden Pulkinen | Audrey Shin | —N/a | Avonley Nguyen; Grigory Smirnov |
| Dinh Tran | Lindsay Thorngren | —N/a | Eva Pate; Logan Bye |
| Paul Yeung | Sierra Venetta | —N/a | Livvy Shilling; Ryan O'Donnell |
| Vincent Zhou | Kate Wang | —N/a | Katarina Wolfkostin; Jeffrey Chen |
| —N/a | Wren Warne-Jacobsen | —N/a | —N/a |

=== Junior ===
| Men | Women | Pairs | Ice dance |
|---|---|---|---|
| Will Annis | Sonia Baram | Sonia Baram; Daniel Tioumentsev | Kristina Bland; Matthew Sperry |
| Philip Baker | Gwen Bloesch | Brooke Barret; Levon Davis | Helena Carhart; Volodymyr Horovyi |
| Goku Endo | Elsa Cheng | Winter Deardorff; Jake Pagano | Olivia Dietrich; Eduard Pylypenko |
| Allan Fisher | Hazel Collier | Cate Fleming; Chase Finster | Madeline Freeman; Christian Bennett |
| Jonathan Hildebrandt | Sarah Everhardt | Ellie Kam; Ian Meyh | Madeleine Gans; Jim Wang |
| Joseph Klein | Hannah Herrera | Isabelle Martins; Ryan Bedard | Jenna Hauer; Benjamin Starr |
| Kai Kovar | Mia Kalin | Lilianna Murray; Jordan Gillette | Romy Malcom; Noah Lafornara |
| Lake Liao | Katie Krafchik | Catherine Rivers; Timmy Chapman | Angela Ling; Caleb Wein |
| Antonio Monaco | Josephine Lee | Mandy Romero; Kristofer Ogren | Leah Neset; Artem Markelov |
| Nhat-Viet Nguyen | Elyce Lin-Gracey | Cayla Smith; Andy Deng | Caroline Mullen; Brendan Mullen |
| Jacob Sanchez | Hannah Lofton | Megan Wessenberg; Blake Eisenach | Elliana Peal; Ethan Peal |
| Taira Shinohara | Rinako Oya | Sylvia Wong; Skylar Weirens | Vanessa Pham; Jonathan Rogers |
| Beck Strommer | Abigail Ross | —N/a | |
| Michael Xie | Clare Seo | —N/a | |
| Robert Yampolsky | Katie Shen | —N/a | |
| Maxim Zharkov | Adele Zheng | —N/a | |
| —N/a | Ava Marie Ziegler | —N/a | |

=== Changes to preliminary assignments ===
| Date | Discipline | Withdrew | Added | Notes | Ref. |
|---|---|---|---|---|---|
| December 9, 2021 | Senior men | Maxim Naumov | —N/a | Injury | |
| December 9, 2021 | Junior ice dance | Anabelle Larson; Lucas Appel | Madeline Freeman; Christian Bennett | Split | |
| December 27, 2021 | Senior pairs | Chelsea Liu; Daniel O'Shea | —N/a | Injury | |
| December 27, 2021 | Junior pairs | Ashley Fletcher; Aiden Brown | Lilianna Murray; Jordan Gillette | | |
| December 28, 2021 | Junior women | Ashley Leahy | Rinako Oya | | |
| December 31, 2021 | Senior women | Bradie Tennell | —N/a | Injury | |
| January 1, 2022 | Senior pairs | Maria Mokhova; Ivan Mokhov | —N/a | | |
| January 1, 2022 | Senior pairs | Anastasiia Smirnova; Danil Siianytsia | —N/a | Positive COVID-19 test | |
| January 1, 2022 | Junior men | Lucas Broussard | Philip Baker | | |
| January 1, 2022 | Junior ice dance | Isabella Flores; Dimitry Tsarevski | —N/a | Personal reasons (Tsarevski) | |
| January 2, 2022 | Junior ice dance | Oona Brown; Gage Brown | —N/a | Positive COVID-19 test | |
| January 3, 2022 | Junior men | Samuel Mindra | —N/a | | |
| January 3, 2022 | Junior men | Matthew Nielsen | —N/a | | |
| January 3, 2022 | Junior ice dance | Rebecca Kerscher; Davis Ortonward | —N/a | | |
| January 4, 2022 | Senior women | Finley Hawk | —N/a | | |
| January 4, 2022 | Junior women | Soho Lee | —N/a | | |
| January 5, 2022 | Senior men | Tomoki Hiwatashi | —N/a | Positive COVID-19 test | |
| January 7, 2022 | Senior men | Eric Sjoberg | —N/a | | |

== Schedule ==
| Date | Discipline | Time | Segment |
|---|---|---|---|
| January 4 | Junior pairs | 12:00 | Short program |
| January 4 | Junior men | 12:00 | Short program |
| January 4 | Junior ice dance | 20:15 | Rhythm dance |
| January 5 | Junior women | 09:00 | Short program |
| January 5 | Junior men | 12:00 | Free skate |
| January 5 | Junior pairs | 12:00 | Free skate |
| January 5 | Junior ice dance | 20:30 | Free dance |
| January 6 | Junior women | 11:45 | Free skate |
| January 6 | Senior pairs | 15:45 | Short program |
| January 6 | Senior women | 18:30 | Short program |
| January 7 | Senior ice dance | 14:00 | Rhythm dance |
| January 7 | Senior women | 18:30 | Free skate |
| January 8 | Senior men | 14:00 | Short program |
| January 8 | Senior pairs | 17:45 | Free skate |
| January 8 | Senior ice dance | 19:25 | Free dance |
| January 9 | Senior men | 11:15 | Free skate |
| January 9 | —N/a | 18:30 | Skating Spectacular |

- All times are listed in local time (UTC-06:00).

== Medal summary ==
=== Senior ===
| Discipline | Gold | Silver | Bronze | Pewter |
|---|---|---|---|---|
| Men | Nathan Chen | Ilia Malinin | Vincent Zhou | Jason Brown |
| Women | Mariah Bell | Karen Chen | Isabeau Levito | Gabriella Izzo |
| Pairs | Ashley Cain-Gribble; Timothy LeDuc | Jessica Calalang; Brian Johnson | Audrey Lu; Misha Mitrofanov | Emily Chan; Spencer Akira Howe |
| Ice dance | Madison Chock; Evan Bates | Madison Hubbell; Zachary Donohue | Kaitlin Hawayek; Jean-Luc Baker | Caroline Green; Michael Parsons |

=== Junior ===
| Discipline | Gold | Silver | Bronze | Pewter |
|---|---|---|---|---|
| Men | Kai Kovar | Will Annis | Maxim Zharkov | Joseph Klein |
| Women | Clare Seo | Ava Marie Ziegler | Josephine Lee | Katie Shen |
| Pairs | Sonia Baram; Daniel Tioumentsev | Isabelle Martins; Ryan Bedard | Catherine Rivers; Timmy Chapman | Megan Wessenberg; Blake Eisenach |
| Ice dance | Leah Neset; Artem Markelov | Angela Ling; Caleb Wein | Elliana Peal; Ethan Peal | Vanessa Pham; Jonathan Rogers |

== Senior results ==
=== Senior men ===
William Hubbart withdrew prior to the event due to testing positive for COVID-19. Yaroslav Paniot withdrew during the free skate due to boot issues.

| Rank | Name | Total points | SP | | FS | |
|---|---|---|---|---|---|---|
| 1 | Nathan Chen | 328.01 | 1 | 115.39 | 1 | 212.62 |
| 2 | Ilia Malinin | 302.48 | 3 | 103.46 | 2 | 199.02 |
| 3 | Vincent Zhou | 290.16 | 2 | 112.78 | 4 | 177.38 |
| 4 | Jason Brown | 289.78 | 4 | 100.84 | 3 | 188.94 |
| 5 | Camden Pulkinen | 260.41 | 6 | 90.16 | 5 | 170.25 |
| 6 | Jimmy Ma | 226.98 | 5 | 91.62 | 8 | 135.36 |
| 7 | Liam Kapeikis | 221.31 | 8 | 73.77 | 6 | 147.54 |
| 8 | Dinh Tran | 215.72 | 9 | 71.18 | 7 | 144.54 |
| 9 | Ryan Dunk | 191.36 | 11 | 65.66 | 9 | 125.70 |
| 10 | Paul Yeung | 183.74 | 13 | 60.01 | 10 | 123.73 |
| 11 | Artur Dmitriev | 183.01 | 12 | 62.40 | 11 | 120.61 |
| 12 | Mitchell Friess | 171.19 | 10 | 66.07 | 13 | 105.12 |
| 13 | Sebastian Payannet | 162.28 | 14 | 48.52 | 12 | 113.76 |
| WD | Yaroslav Paniot | withdrew | 7 | 88.68 | withdrew from competition | |
| WD | William Hubbart | withdrew from competition | | | | |

=== Senior women ===
Alysa Liu and Amber Glenn withdrew after the short program due to testing positive for COVID-19.

| Rank | Name | Total points | SP | | FS | |
|---|---|---|---|---|---|---|
| 1 | Mariah Bell | 216.25 | 1 | 75.55 | 1 | 140.70 |
| 2 | Karen Chen | 213.85 | 2 | 74.55 | 3 | 139.30 |
| 3 | Isabeau Levito | 210.75 | 4 | 71.00 | 2 | 139.75 |
| 4 | Gabriella Izzo | 188.11 | 7 | 67.51 | 4 | 120.60 |
| 5 | Lindsay Thorngren | 186.38 | 5 | 70.22 | 7 | 116.16 |
| 6 | Audrey Shin | 180.58 | 9 | 61.77 | 5 | 118.81 |
| 7 | Kate Wang | 178.20 | 8 | 64.27 | 8 | 113.93 |
| 8 | Hanna Harrell | 175.66 | 12 | 56.99 | 6 | 118.67 |
| 9 | Starr Andrews | 173.04 | 11 | 59.43 | 9 | 113.61 |
| 10 | Gracie Gold | 171.92 | 6 | 67.61 | 12 | 104.31 |
| 11 | Jill Heiner | 171.54 | 10 | 60.30 | 10 | 111.24 |
| 12 | Sierra Venetta | 164.24 | 15 | 53.88 | 11 | 110.36 |
| 13 | Rena Ikenishi | 158.69 | 13 | 55.32 | 13 | 103.37 |
| 14 | Wren Warne-Jacobsen | 143.39 | 16 | 48.45 | 14 | 94.94 |
| WD | Alysa Liu | withdrew | 3 | 71.42 | withdrew from competition | |
| WD | Amber Glenn | withdrew | 14 | 54.80 | withdrew from competition | |

=== Senior pairs ===
Alexa Knierim & Brandon Frazier withdrew prior to the event after Frazier tested positive for COVID-19.

| Rank | Name | Total points | SP | | FS | |
|---|---|---|---|---|---|---|
| 1 | Ashley Cain-Gribble / Timothy LeDuc | 225.23 | 1 | 79.39 | 1 | 145.84 |
| 2 | Jessica Calalang / Brian Johnson | 209.87 | 2 | 77.48 | 2 | 132.39 |
| 3 | Audrey Lu / Misha Mitrofanov | 191.54 | 3 | 68.11 | 3 | 123.43 |
| 4 | Emily Chan / Spencer Akira Howe | 177.25 | 4 | 61.94 | 5 | 115.31 |
| 5 | Katie McBeath / Nathan Bartholomay | 167.10 | 6 | 50.11 | 4 | 116.99 |
| 6 | Valentina Plazas / Maximiliano Fernandez | 148.37 | 7 | 49.80 | 6 | 98.57 |
| 7 | Kate Finster / Matej Silecky | 144.14 | 5 | 54.68 | 8 | 89.46 |
| 8 | Sydney Cooke / Keyton Bearinger | 136.31 | 8 | 44.28 | 7 | 92.03 |
| WD | Alexa Knierim / Brandon Frazier | withdrew from competition | | | | |

=== Senior ice dance ===
Avonley Nguyen & Grigory Smirnov withdrew prior to the event due to Smirnov's hip injury. Raffaella Koncius & Alexey Shchepetov withdrew before the free dance due to testing positive for COVID-19.

| Rank | Name | Total points | RD | | FD | |
|---|---|---|---|---|---|---|
| 1 | Madison Chock / Evan Bates | 227.37 | 1 | 91.94 | 2 | 135.43 |
| 2 | Madison Hubbell / Zachary Donohue | 225.59 | 2 | 89.39 | 1 | 136.20 |
| 3 | Kaitlin Hawayek / Jean-Luc Baker | 205.68 | 4 | 79.39 | 3 | 126.29 |
| 4 | Caroline Green / Michael Parsons | 203.27 | 3 | 80.85 | 4 | 122.42 |
| 5 | Emily Bratti / Ian Somerville | 187.98 | 6 | 76.70 | 6 | 111.28 |
| 6 | Katarina Wolfkostin / Jeffrey Chen | 187.27 | 7 | 75.28 | 5 | 111.99 |
| 7 | Christina Carreira / Anthony Ponomarenko | 185.82 | 5 | 77.90 | 7 | 107.92 |
| 8 | Eva Pate / Logan Bye | 180.72 | 8 | 73.06 | 8 | 107.66 |
| 9 | Lorraine McNamara / Anton Spiridonov | 179.35 | 9 | 73.04 | 9 | 106.31 |
| 10 | Molly Cesanek / Yehor Yehorov | 172.11 | 10 | 70.07 | 10 | 102.04 |
| 11 | Cayla Cottrell / Uladzislau Palkhouski | 118.80 | 13 | 49.82 | 11 | 68.98 |
| 12 | Livvy Shilling / Ryan O'Donnell | 115.43 | 12 | 50.90 | 13 | 64.53 |
| 13 | Cara Murphy / Joshua Levitt | 106.01 | 14 | 40.49 | 12 | 65.52 |
| WD | Raffaella Koncius / Alexey Shchepetov | withdrew | 11 | 52.63 | withdrew from competition | |
| WD | Avonley Nguyen / Grigory Smirnov | withdrew from competition | | | | |

== Junior results ==
=== Junior men ===
| Rank | Name | Total points | SP | | FS | |
|---|---|---|---|---|---|---|
| 1 | Kai Kovar | 204.68 | 2 | 68.70 | 1 | 135.98 |
| 2 | Will Annis | 202.87 | 1 | 75.81 | 2 | 127.06 |
| 3 | Maxim Zharkov | 188.15 | 3 | 67.07 | 3 | 121.08 |
| 4 | Joseph Klein | 176.97 | 5 | 63.71 | 4 | 113.26 |
| 5 | Robert Yampolsky | 173.78 | 8 | 61.45 | 5 | 112.33 |
| 6 | Beck Strommer | 173.13 | 4 | 64.44 | 7 | 108.69 |
| 7 | Taira Shinohara | 172.64 | 6 | 61.85 | 6 | 110.79 |
| 8 | Jonathan Hildebrandt | 158.35 | 7 | 61.65 | 12 | 96.70 |
| 9 | Jacob Sanchez | 155.03 | 13 | 48.41 | 8 | 106.62 |
| 10 | Antonio Monaco | 154.07 | 11 | 53.63 | 9 | 100.44 |
| 11 | Goku Endo | 152.56 | 10 | 54.37 | 11 | 98.19 |
| 12 | Philip Baker | 151.14 | 9 | 59.84 | 13 | 91.30 |
| 13 | Michael Xie | 149.69 | 12 | 49.26 | 10 | 100.43 |
| 14 | Nhat-Viet Nguyen | 138.14 | 14 | 47.59 | 14 | 90.55 |
| 15 | Lake Liao | 131.58 | 16 | 44.00 | 15 | 87.58 |
| 16 | Allan Fisher | 125.50 | 15 | 45.37 | 16 | 80.13 |

=== Junior women ===
| Rank | Name | Total points | SP | | FS | |
|---|---|---|---|---|---|---|
| 1 | Clare Seo | 185.53 | 1 | 67.38 | 2 | 118.15 |
| 2 | Ava Ziegler | 175.50 | 4 | 60.24 | 3 | 115.26 |
| 3 | Josephine Lee | 172.08 | 3 | 60.61 | 4 | 111.47 |
| 4 | Katie Shen | 170.77 | 8 | 51.20 | 1 | 119.57 |
| 5 | Elyce Lin-Gracey | 166.96 | 2 | 62.53 | 6 | 104.43 |
| 6 | Mia Kalin | 155.58 | 5 | 57.13 | 7 | 98.45 |
| 7 | Adele Zheng | 153.76 | 6 | 55.57 | 8 | 98.19 |
| 8 | Elsa Cheng | 147.62 | 7 | 53.61 | 9 | 94.01 |
| 9 | Hannah Herrera | 147.32 | 16 | 40.80 | 5 | 106.52 |
| 10 | Abigail Ross | 138.34 | 9 | 50.72 | 11 | 87.62 |
| 11 | Sarah Everhardt | 136.79 | 11 | 48.47 | 10 | 88.32 |
| 12 | Gwen Bloesch | 128.09 | 14 | 41.18 | 12 | 86.91 |
| 13 | Sonia Baram | 123.96 | 17 | 40.45 | 13 | 83.51 |
| 14 | Katie Krafchik | 121.20 | 10 | 49.44 | 17 | 71.76 |
| 15 | Hannah Lofton | 118.74 | 13 | 42.08 | 14 | 76.66 |
| 16 | Rinako Oya | 117.55 | 12 | 43.62 | 16 | 73.93 |
| 17 | Hazel Collier | 116.13 | 15 | 40.97 | 15 | 75.16 |

=== Junior pairs ===
| Rank | Name | Total points | SP | | FS | |
|---|---|---|---|---|---|---|
| 1 | Sonia Baram / Daniel Tioumentsev | 171.36 | 1 | 62.26 | 1 | 109.10 |
| 2 | Isabelle Martins / Ryan Bedard | 144.71 | 2 | 54.89 | 2 | 89.82 |
| 3 | Catherine Rivers / Timmy Chapman | 130.75 | 5 | 45.70 | 3 | 85.05 |
| 4 | Megan Wessenberg / Blake Eisenach | 129.09 | 7 | 44.82 | 4 | 84.27 |
| 5 | Cayla Smith / Andy Deng | 126.11 | 3 | 48.70 | 6 | 77.41 |
| 6 | Cate Fleming / Chase Finster | 125.43 | 6 | 45.30 | 5 | 80.13 |
| 7 | Winter Deardorff / Jake Pagano | 117.28 | 8 | 44.14 | 7 | 73.14 |
| 8 | Brooke Barrett / Levon Davis | 106.36 | 12 | 33.43 | 8 | 72.93 |
| 9 | Mandy Romero / Kristofer Ogren | 105.53 | 11 | 33.61 | 9 | 71.92 |
| 10 | Sylvia Wong / Skylar Weirens | 104.28 | 9 | 37.68 | 10 | 66.60 |
| 11 | Lilianna Murray / Jordan Gillette | 100.18 | 10 | 37.09 | 11 | 63.09 |
| WD | Ellie Kam / Ian Meyh | withdrew | 4 | 46.16 | withdrew from competition | |

=== Junior ice dance ===
| Rank | Name | Total points | RD | | FD | |
|---|---|---|---|---|---|---|
| 1 | Leah Neset / Artem Markelov | 155.84 | 2 | 64.31 | 1 | 91.53 |
| 2 | Angela Ling / Caleb Wein | 153.58 | 1 | 64.99 | 2 | 88.59 |
| 3 | Elliana Peal / Ethan Peal | 140.67 | 5 | 54.94 | 3 | 85.73 |
| 4 | Vanessa Pham / Jonathan Rogers | 140.08 | 3 | 55.36 | 4 | 84.72 |
| 5 | Helena Carhart / Volodymyr Horovyi | 136.20 | 4 | 54.97 | 5 | 81.23 |
| 6 | Jenna Hauer / Benjamin Starr | 128.92 | 6 | 50.85 | 7 | 78.07 |
| 7 | Caroline Mullen / Brendan Mullen | 127.35 | 8 | 47.90 | 6 | 79.45 |
| 8 | Kristina Bland / Matthew Sperry | 123.63 | 7 | 49.57 | 8 | 74.06 |
| 9 | Romy Malcolm / Noah Lafornara | 108.18 | 9 | 44.27 | 9 | 63.91 |
| 10 | Madeleine Gans / Jim Wang | 100.92 | 10 | 43.74 | 11 | 57.18 |
| 11 | Madeline Freeman / Christian Bennett | 99.69 | 12 | 38.39 | 10 | 61.30 |
| 12 | Olivia Dietrich / Eduard Pylypenko | 95.93 | 11 | 39.44 | 12 | 56.49 |

== International team selections ==
=== Four Continents Championships ===
The 2022 Four Continents Championships were held from January 18–23 in Tallinn, Estonia. Teams were selected using the Athlete Selection criteria. The women's team was named on January 8, 2022.

| | Men | Women | Pairs | Ice dance |
|---|---|---|---|---|
| 1 | Tomoki Hiwatashi | Starr Andrews | Emily Chan / Spencer Akira Howe | Emily Bratti / Ian Somerville |
| 2 | Jimmy Ma | Gabriella Izzo | Audrey Lu / Misha Mitrofanov | Christina Carreira / Anthony Ponomarenko |
| 3 | Camden Pulkinen | Audrey Shin | Katie McBeath / Nathan Bartholomay | Caroline Green / Michael Parsons |
| 1st alt. | Ryan Dunk | Hanna Harrell | | Eva Pate / Logan Bye |
| 2nd alt. | | Sierra Venetta | | Lorraine McNamara / Anton Spiridonov |
| 3rd alt. | | | | Molly Cesanek / Yehor Yehorov |

=== Olympic Games ===
The 2022 Winter Olympics were held from February 4–20 in Beijing, China. Teams were selected using the Athlete Selection criteria. The women's team was announced on January 8, 2022.

| | Men | Women | Pairs | Ice dance |
|---|---|---|---|---|
| 1 | Jason Brown | Mariah Bell | Ashley Cain-Gribble / Timothy LeDuc | Madison Chock / Evan Bates |
| 2 | Nathan Chen | Karen Chen | Alexa Knierim / Brandon Frazier | Kaitlin Hawayek / Jean-Luc Baker |
| 3 | Vincent Zhou | Alysa Liu | | Madison Hubbell / Zachary Donohue |
| 1st alt. | Ilia Malinin | Lindsay Thorngren | Jessica Calalang / Brian Johnson | Caroline Green / Michael Parsons |
| 2nd alt. | Camden Pulkinen | Amber Glenn | Audrey Lu / Misha Mitrofanov | Emily Bratti / Ian Somerville |
| 3rd alt. | Jimmy Ma | Gabriella Izzo | Emily Chan / Spencer Akira Howe | Katarina Wolfkostin / Jeffrey Chen |

=== World Junior Championships ===
Commonly referred to as "Junior Worlds", the 2022 World Junior Championships were held from April 13–17, 2022 in Tallinn, Estonia. Teams were selected using the Athlete Selection criteria. The full team was named on February 3, 2022.

| | Men | Women | Pairs | Ice dance |
|---|---|---|---|---|
| 1 | ~~Lucas Broussard~~ (withdrew) | Isabeau Levito | ~~Isabelle Martins / Ryan Bedard~~ (withdrew) | Oona Brown / Gage Brown |
| 2 | Liam Kapeikis | Clare Seo | Anastasiia Smirnova / Danil Siianytsia | Angela Ling / Caleb Wein |
| 3 | Ilia Malinin | Lindsay Thorngren | | Katarina Wolfkostin / Jeffrey Chen |
| 1st alt. | Kai Kovar (called up) | Josephine Lee | Catherine Rivers / Timmy Chapman (called up) | Leah Neset / Artem Markelov |
| 2nd alt. | Matthew Nielsen | Kanon Smith | Cate Fleming / Chase Finster | Helena Carhart / Volodymyr Horovyi |
| 3rd alt. | Robert Yampolsky | Ava Marie Ziegler | | |

=== World Championships ===
The 2022 World Championships were held from March 21–27 in Montpellier, France. Teams were selected using the Athlete Selection criteria. The women's team was named on January 8, 2022.

| | Men | Women | Pairs | Ice dance |
|---|---|---|---|---|
| 1 | ~~Nathan Chen~~ (withdrew) | Mariah Bell | Ashley Cain-Gribble / Timothy LeDuc | Madison Chock / Evan Bates |
| 2 | Ilia Malinin | Karen Chen | Alexa Knierim / Brandon Frazier | Madison Hubbell / Zachary Donohue |
| 3 | Vincent Zhou | Alysa Liu | | Kaitlin Hawayek / Jean-Luc Baker |
| 1st alt. | Jason Brown | Amber Glenn | Jessica Calalang / Brian Johnson | Caroline Green / Michael Parsons |
| 2nd alt. | Camden Pulkinen (called up) | Lindsay Thorngren | Audrey Lu / Misha Mitrofanov | Emily Bratti / Ian Somerville |
| 3rd alt. | Jimmy Ma | Gabriella Izzo | Emily Chan / Spencer Akira Howe | Christina Carreira / Anthony Ponomarenko |
