= Artem Markelov (figure skater) =

American ice dancer (born 2003)

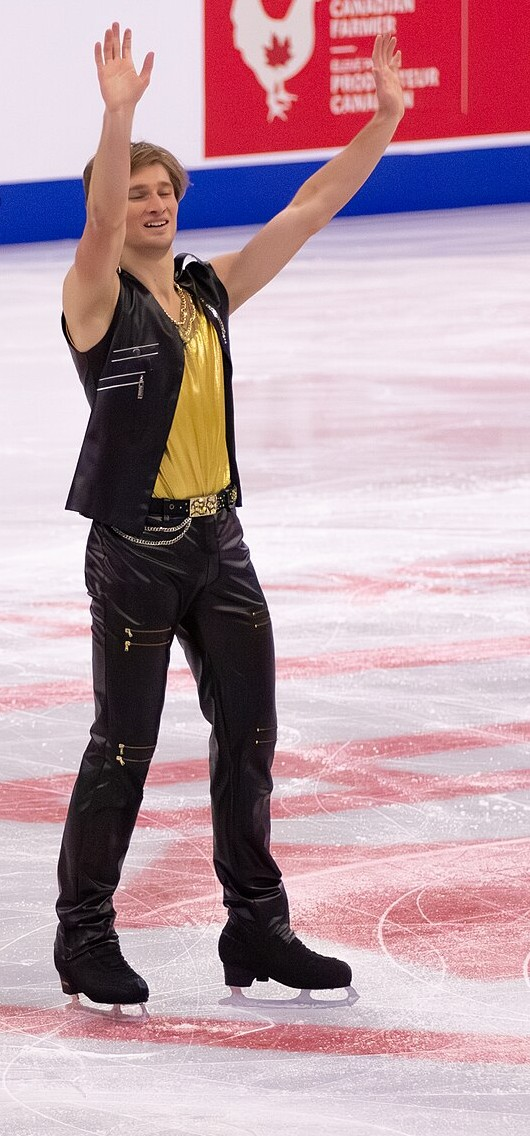
- Artem Markelov at 2025 Skate Canada International

Personal information
- Native name: Артём Алексеевич Маркелов
- Full name: Artem Alexeyevich Markelov
- Born: July 10, 2003 (age 23) Volzhsky, Russia
- Home town: Colorado Springs, Colorado, U.S.

Figure skating career
- Country: United States
- Discipline: Ice dance
- Partner: Leah Neset (since 2020); Kristina Makeeva (2019–20)
- Coach: Elena Dostatni
- Skating club: Magic City Figure Skating Club

Medal record
World Junior Championships
Gold medal – first place	2024 Taipei	Ice dance
Junior Grand Prix Final
Gold medal – first place	2023–24 Beijing	Ice dance

Artem Alexeyevich Markelov (Russian: Артём Алексеевич Маркелов; born July 10, 2003) is an American ice dancer. With his skating partner and wife, Leah Neset, he is a two-time Challenger Series bronze medalist, the 2024 World Junior champion, 2023–24 Junior Grand Prix Final champion, a two-time ISU Junior Grand Prix gold medalist, and a three-time U.S. junior national champion (2022, 2023, 2024).

== Personal life ==
Markelov was born on July 10, 2003, in Volzhsky, Russia to mother Elena, a lawyer, and father Alexey, deputy director of a tire manufacturing facility. He has two sisters, Diana and Milana. Markelov completed his high school education in Russia in 2021, and is currently a computer science major at Western Governors University in addition to studying data analytics and systems engineering at the University of Colorado Colorado Springs.

Markelov and his skating partner, Leah Neset, began dating in February 2022. They married in Santa Fe County, two days after Neset's 17th birthday, with his and Neset's mothers acting as witnesses. They had a public wedding ceremony on June 1, 2024.

== Career ==
=== Early years ===
Markelov was inspired to take up skating at age nine after attending a friend's skating birthday party. He learned up to a double Axel and a triple loop as a single skater before relocating to Moscow on his own, at first to pursue pair skating, but ultimately ice dance. Markelov and his first partner, Kristina Makeeva, teamed up in 2019 and competed internationally as advanced novices at the 2019 Santa Claus Cup. They chose to part ways in 2020.

Markelov connected with his current partner, Leah Neset, when he was contacted by the American skater and her coach via a Russian ice dance partner search website. A native of Volgograd, Markelov, who could not speak English, chose to relocate to the United States to partner with Neset in March 2020, just before the COVID-19 pandemic curtailed international travel.

Neset/Markelov competed at the 2021 U.S. Figure Skating Championships where they finished sixth in the junior ice dance category.

=== 2021–22 season: International junior debut ===
Neset/Markelov made their international junior debut in August at the 2021 Lake Placid Ice Dance International, where they placed third behind compatriots Flores/Tsarevski and Ling/Wein.

The following month, the team debuted on the ISU Junior Grand Prix circuit at the 2021 JGP Russia where they placed eighth. They would later describe the local audience as "supportive," in light of it being Markelov's home country. They improved upon their first placement at their second assignment, the 2021 JGP Poland, coming fifth.

Neset/Markelov wrapped their season in January at the 2022 U.S. Championships. They placed second in the rhythm dance and first in the free dance to claim their first junior national title by a narrow two-point margin over Ling/Wein. She said afterward that they were "very happy with how it went. We feel like we gave it our all." Despite their gold medal, they were not selected for one of the three American berths at the 2022 World Junior Championships, being passed over in favour of teams with stronger prior international results. They were instead named the first alternates.

=== 2022–23 season: Second junior national title ===
Neset and Markelov were initially scheduled to begin the international season at the Armenian stop on the Junior Grand Prix circuit. However, following the onset of a Azerbaijan/Armenia border conflict in September, the event was cancelled. Markelov expressed disappointment, as his Russian-based family had been planning to attend. While the International Skating Union subsequently scheduled a second Polish event as a replacement, Neset/Markelov were not reassigned there. They were therefore unable to vie for a place in the Junior Grand Prix Final, having as their lone assignment the 2022 JGP Italy. They placed second in the rhythm dance and third in the free dance, setting new personal bests in both segments of competition, as well as overall, to claim the bronze medal behind Czech siblings Mrázková/Mrázek and the South Korean team Lim/Quan.

The team secured their place at the 2023 U.S. Championships with a first-place finish in the junior dance category at the 2022 Eastern Sectional Championships before another international outing at the 2022 Santa Claus Cup, where they placed second behind Israeli team Tkachenko/Kiliakov.

In January, Neset/Markelov successfully defended their junior national title at the U.S. Championships, despite a rocky rhythm dance which left them initially in seventh place. The team rallied to win the free skate and thus, the title overall, just narrowly edging out Carhart/Horovyi. Neset remarked afterward that it "definitely took a lot of focus to come back. We are really happy with how it turned out in the end." Due to their placement, Neset/Markelov were named to the U.S. team for the 2023 World Junior Championships in Calgary.

In preparation for their first World Junior Championships, Neset/Markelov competed at the 2022 Bavarian Open ten days after their win at the national championships. They placed third in the rhythm dance and first in the free dance, but ultimately placed second behind reigning German junior national champions Grimm/Savitskiy. Going on to Calgary, Neset/Markelov delivered their highest-scoring performances of the season, first placing seventh in the rhythm dance . They were fifth in the free dance, and rose to fifth overall with a total score of 162.59. Neset said afterward that "this season had some up and downs, but we are overall pleased."

=== 2023–24 season: Undefeated season, World Junior champion and Junior Grand Prix Final gold ===
Neset/Markelov began their third international junior season as they did their first at the Lake Placid Ice Dance International. They won the junior dance title handily with an almost ten-point margin over silver medalists Peal/Peal. On the Junior Grand Prix, they won gold at the 2023 JGP Thailand, the first event on the circuit, by a margin of almost 17 points. Markelov assessed that the team's new programs "have a lot of potential and a lot of room for improvement" as the season progressed. At their second assignment, the 2023 JGP Japan, they again won, albeit by a much narrower two-point margin over Israelis Tkachenko/Kiliakov. Their two wins in hand, Neset/Markelov became the first ice dance team to qualify to the 2023–24 Junior Grand Prix Final.

Entering the Junior Grand Prix Final in Beijing as the title favourites, Neset/Markelov set a new world junior record score in the rhythm dance with 72.48 points, breaking the previous record of reigning World Junior champions Mrázková/Mrázek. They set another new personal best (104.61) in the free dance, taking the gold medal.

In January, Neset/Markelov easily won a third junior national title at the 2024 U.S. Championships, placing first in the rhythm dance and free dance and finishing 25.14 points ahead of silver medalists Pedersen/Chen. They were the first figure skaters to win three consecutive American junior national titles in any of the four disciplines. Neset said that the result "means a lot", with Markelov adding he was "very thankful for the journey."

Heavy pre-event favourites at the 2024 World Junior Championships in Taipei, Neset/Markelov won the rhythm dance by 4.05 points over second-place Germans Grimm/Savitskiy. They won the free dance as well, despite Neset losing her balance and putting a hand down on a choreographic lift, resulting in a technical deduction for a fall. They noted afterward that the choreographic lift was a new element they had created three weeks prior, Neset saying it was "a bit sad that we couldn't show a super clean skate." They said they were undecided as to whether they would compete another season at the junior level or move up to the senior level.

=== 2024–25 season: International senior debut ===
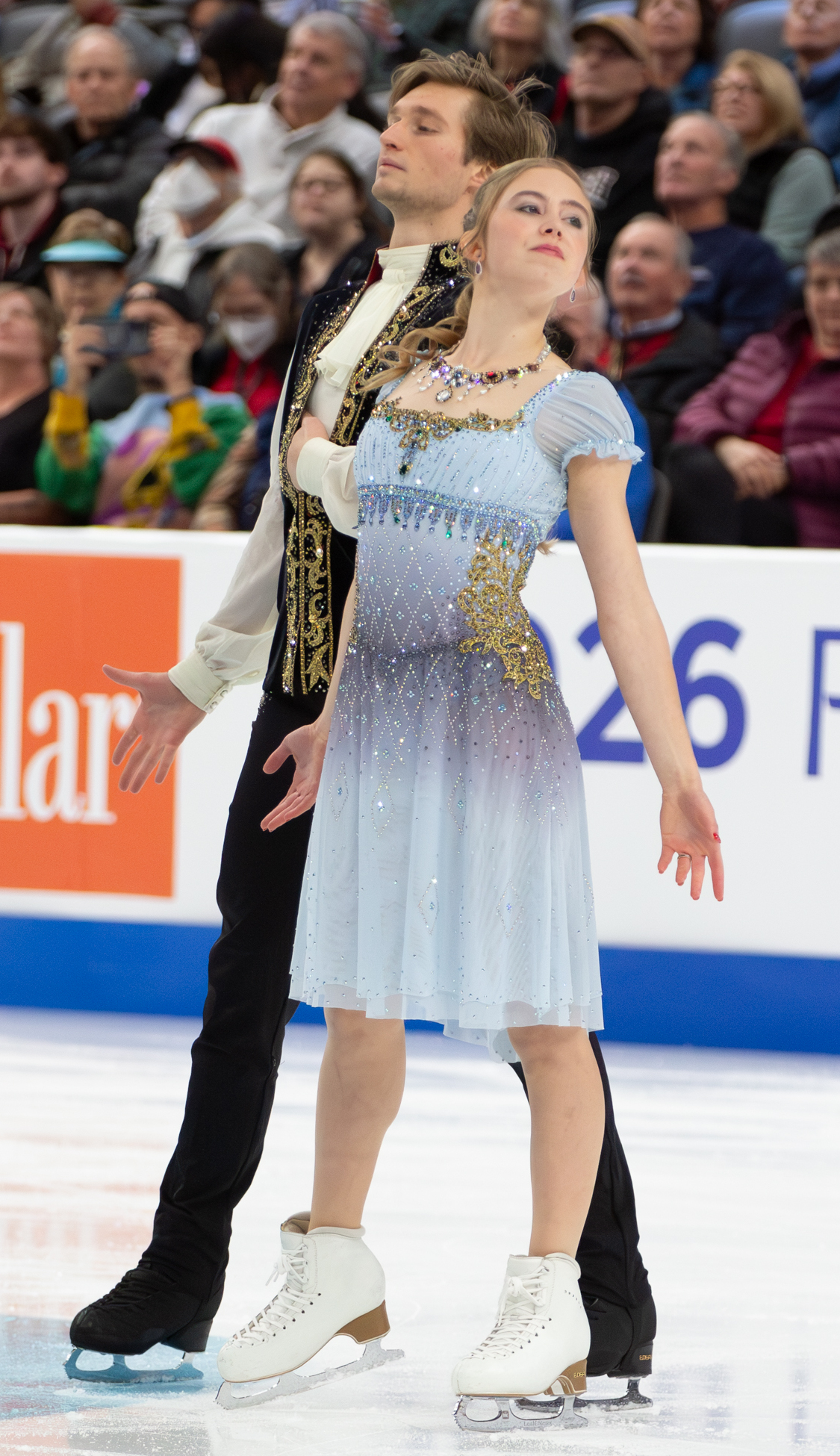
Neset and Markelov during their free dance at the 2026 U.S. Championships

Neset/Markelov started their season at the 2024 Lake Placid Ice Dance International where they ranked fourth in the rhythm dance and second in the free dance ultimately ranking fourth overall. They then made their international senior debut at the 2024 CS Lombardia Trophy where they ranked second in the rhythm dance and fourth in the free dance, ranking third overall and winning the bronze medal.

Making their senior Grand Prix debut, the duo placed fifth at 2024 Skate America and sixth at the 2024 Grand Prix de France.

They then finished the season with a ninth-place finish at the 2025 U.S. Championships.

=== 2025–26 season ===
Neset/Markelov opened their season by competing at the 2025 CS Kinoshita Group Cup where they won the bronze medal. They then competed at the 2025 CS Denis Ten Memorial Challenge where they ranked fifth in both the rhythm dance and free dance, ranking fifth overall.

In November, the duo placed tenth at 2025 Skate Canada International, their sole Grand Prix assignment. The following month, they finished fifth at the 2025 CS Golden Spin of Zagreb.

At the 2026 U.S. Championships in January, Neset/Markelov finished in eighth place.

== Programs ==
=== Ice dance with Leah Neset ===
Season	Rhythm dance	Free dance	Exhibition
2020–2021	La La Land by Justin Hurwitz; City of Stars performed by Ryan Gosling and Emma Stone; Another Day of Sun performed by Cast of La La Land	Caruso by Lucio Dalla; February Sea by George Winston	
2021–2022	Blues: Feeling Good performed by Michael Bublé; DJ Turn It Up by Yellow Claw choreo. by Joel Dear, Elena Dostatni, Ilona Melnichenko	My Immortal by Evanescence; In the End by Linkin Park performed by Tommee Profitt, feat. Fleurie and Jung Youth choreo. by Joel Dear, Elena Dostatni, Ilona Melnichenko, Massimo Scali	
2022–2023	Flamenco: Backstage Romance; Tango: Tango d'amor by Tango Jointz; Flamenco: La Sal de la Tierra by El Lebrijano; Paso Doble: Backstage Romance (from Moulin Rouge!) by Ricky Rojas, Robyn Hurder choreo. by Massimo Scali, Elena Dostatni	Hoist the Colours (from Pirates of the Caribbean: At World's End); Mermaids (from Pirates of the Caribbean: On Stranger Tides) by Hans Zimmer; My Name is Barbossa (from Pirates of the Caribbean: Dead Men Tell No Tales) by Geoff Zanelli; Drink Up Me Hearties (from Pirates of the Caribbean: At World's End) by Hans Zimmer choreo. by Nikolai Morozov	
2023–2024	Still Loving You by Scorpions; I Hate Myself for Loving You by Joan Jett and the Blackhearts choreo. by Kaitlyn Weaver	Anytime, Anywhere by Sarah Brightman; Cry by Thomas Bergersen choreo. by Nikolai Morozov	Telephone by Lady Gaga ft. Beyoncé
2024–2025	Waterloo; Dancing Queen; Gimme! Gimme! Gimme! (A Man After Midnight) by ABBA choreo. by Kaitlyn Weaver, Nikolai Morozov, Elena Dostatni, Tatiana Druchinina	My Love Will Never Die by Claire Wyndham and AG; Hold Your Breath by Astyria; Gloria Regali by Tommee Profitt and Fleurie choreo. by Kaitlyn Weaver, Nikolai Morozov, Elena Dostatni, Tatiana Druchinina	Telephone by Lady Gaga ft. Beyoncé
2025–2026	Be My Lover by La Bouche; Say My Name by Destiny's Child; Everybody (Backstreet's Back) by Backstreet Boys; Spice Up Your Life by Spice Girls choreo. by Elena Dostatni	Napoleon; Return to France; Austerlitz Kyrie; First Counsel; Ladies in Waiting; Napoleon's Piano; Make the Rain Stop; Toulon; Russia by Martin Phipps choreo. by Elena Dostatni	

== Competitive highlights ==
- GP – Event of the ISU Grand Prix Series
- JGP – Event of the ISU Junior Grand Prix Series
- CS – Event of the ISU Challenger Series
- TBD – Assigned
- WD – Withdrew from competition

=== Ice dance with Leah Neset ===
Competition placements at senior level
Season	2024–25	2025–26	2026–27
U.S. Championships	9th	8th	
GP France	6th		5th
GP Skate America	5th		5th
GP Skate Canada International		10th	
CS Denis Ten Memorial		5th	
CS Golden Spin of Zagreb	4th	5th	
CS Kinoshita Group Cup		3rd	
CS Lombardia Trophy	3rd		
CS Nebelhorn Trophy			5th
Lake Placid Ice Dance International	4th		3rd

Competition placements at junior level
Season	2020–21	2021–22	2022–23	2023–24
World Junior Championships			5th	1st
Junior Grand Prix Final				1st
U.S. Championships	6th	1st	1st	1st
JGP Italy			3rd	
JGP Japan				1st
JGP Poland		5th		
JGP Russia		8th		
JGP Thailand				1st
Bavarian Open			2nd	
Lake Placid Ice Dance		3rd		1st
Santa Claus Cup			2nd	

== Detailed results ==
ISU personal best scores in the +5/-5 GOE System
Segment	Type	Score	Event
Total	TSS	179.38	2024 Skate America
Rhythm dance	TSS	72.48	2023–24 Junior Grand Prix Final
Rhythm dance	TES	41.09	2023–24 Junior Grand Prix Final
Rhythm dance	PCS	31.96	2024 World Junior Championships
Free dance	TSS	109.70	2024 Skate America
Free dance	TES	62.42	2024 Skate America
Free dance	PCS	48.44	2023–24 Junior Grand Prix Final

=== Ice dance with Leah Neset ===
- Small medals for the rhythm dance and free dance are only awarded at ISU Championships.

==== Senior level ====
Results in the 2024–25 season
Date	Event	RD		FD		Total	
Date	Event	P	Score	P	Score	P	Score
Jul 30–31, 2024	(United States) 2024 Lake Placid Ice Dance International	4	71.21	2	112.54	4	183.75
Sep 12–15, 2024	(Italy) 2024 CS Lombardia Trophy	2	70.77	4	104.56	3	175.33
Oct 18–20, 2024	(United States) 2024 Skate America	8	69.68	5	109.70	5	179.38
Oct 31 – Nov 3, 2024	2024 Grand Prix de France	6	71.86	6	104.74	6	176.60
Dec 4–7, 2024	(Croatia) 2024 CS Golden Spin of Zagreb	4	70.19	4	101.44	4	171.63
Jan 20–26, 2025	(United States) 2025 U.S. Championships	9	72.17	7	110.95	9	183.12

Results in the 2025–26 season
Date	Event	RD		FD		Total	
Date	Event	P	Score	P	Score	P	Score
Sep 5–7, 2025	(Japan) 2025 CS Kinoshita Group Cup	3	68.77	3	107.50	3	176.27
Oct 1–4, 2025	(Kazakhstan) 2025 CS Denis Ten Memorial Challenge	5	67.80	5	101.80	5	169.60
Oct 31 – Nov 2, 2025	2025 Skate Canada International	9	65.51	10	99.68	10	165.19
Dec 3–6, 2025	(Croatia) 2025 CS Golden Spin of Zagreb	8	63.85	5	104.73	5	168.58
Jan 4–11, 2026	(United States) 2026 U.S. Championships	9	71.28	8	105.18	8	176.46

Results in the 2026–27 season
Date	Event	RD		FD		Total	
Date	Event	P	Score	P	Score	P	Score
Jul 28–30, 2026	(United States) 2026 Lake Placid Ice Dance International	3	62.67	3	97.24	3	159.91
Sep 24–26, 2026	(Germany) 2026 CS Nebelhorn Trophy	5	66.88	5	103.88	5	170.76
Oct 23–25, 2026	2026 Grand Prix de France	6	64.60	5	100.12	5	164.72
Nov 13–15, 2026	(United States) 2026 Skate America	6	69.10	5	106.54	5	175.64

==== Junior level ====
Results in the 2020–21 season
Date	Event	RD		FD		Total	
Date	Event	P	Score	P	Score	P	Score
Jan 11–21, 2021	(United States) 2021 U.S. Championships (Junior)	6	50.76	6	77.26	6	128.02

Results in the 2021–22 season
Date	Event	RD		FD		Total	
Date	Event	P	Score	P	Score	P	Score
Aug 12–15, 2021	(United States) 2021 Lake Placid Ice Dance International	4	50.84	2	84.46	3	135.30
Sep 15–18, 2021	2021 JGP Russia	9	51.57	9	88.97	8	140.54
Sep 29 – Oct 2, 2021	2021 JGP Poland	6	53.83	5	81.51	5	135.34
Jan 3–9, 2022	(United States) 2022 U.S. Championships (Junior)	2	64.31	1	91.53	1	155.84

Results in the 2022–23 season
Date	Event	RD		FD		Total	
Date	Event	P	Score	P	Score	P	Score
Oct 12–15, 2022	2022 JGP Italy	2	61.27	3	95.09	3	156.36
Nov 28 – Dec 4, 2022	(Hungary) 2022 Santa Claus Cup	2	59.64	1	93.41	2	153.05
Jan 23–29, 2023	(United States) 2023 U.S. Championships (Junior)	7	56.19	1	105.56	1	161.75
Jan 31 – Feb 5, 2023	(Germany) 2023 Bavarian Open	3	65.29	1	99.14	2	164.43
Feb 27 – Mar 5, 2023	(Canada) 2023 World Junior Championships	7	64.01	5	98.58	5	162.59

Results in the 2023–24 season
Date	Event	RD		FD		Total	
Date	Event	P	Score	P	Score	P	Score
Aug 1–2, 2023	(United States) 2023 Lake Placid Ice Dance International	1	63.99	1	97.28	1	161.27
Aug 23–26, 2023	2023 JGP Thailand	1	68.99	1	99.48	1	168.47
Sep 14–16, 2023	2023 JGP Japan	1	67.37	1	100.14	1	167.51
Dec 7–10, 2023	(China) 2023–24 Junior Grand Prix Final	1	72.48	1	104.61	1	177.09
Jan 22–28, 2024	(United States) 2024 U.S. Championships (Junior)	1	75.03	1	109.08	1	184.11
Feb 26 – Mar 3, 2024	(Taiwan) 2024 World Junior Championships	1	70.16	1	99.60	1	169.76
