= Lindsay Thorngren =

American retired figure skater

Personal information
- Born: December 5, 2005 (age 20) White Plains, New York, U.S.
- Home town: Montclair, New Jersey, U.S.
- Height: 5 ft 3 in (1.60 m)

Figure skating career
- Country: United States
- Discipline: Women's singles
- Coach: Julia Lautowa
- Skating club: Ice House Figure Skating Club of New Jersey
- Began skating: 2011
- Retired: 2025

Medal record
World Junior Championships
Bronze medal – third place	2022 Tallinn	Singles

Lindsay Thorngren (born December 5, 2005) is an American retired figure skater. She is the 2023 NHK Trophy silver medalist and 2022 CS Golden Spin of Zagreb champion.

At the junior level, Thorngren was the 2022 World Junior bronze medalist, the 2021 JGP France I champion, and the 2020 U.S. national junior champion.

== Personal life ==
Thorngren was born on December 5, 2005, in White Plains, New York, to parents Edward and Elizabeth. Her mother, Elizabeth, immigrated to the United States from the Dominican Republic at age 15.

She currently studies financial technology at the New Jersey Institute of Technology.

== Career ==
=== Early years ===
Thorngren began learning to skate in 2009 as a four-year-old in Maple Grove, Minnesota. She participated in her first competition in 2010 at the age of five. She began training under her current coach, Julia Lautowa when her family relocated from Minnesota to New Jersey. Thorngren competed at her first U.S. Championship in 2017 at the juvenile level, where she finished sixth. She went on to win the U.S. intermediate women's title in 2019 and the junior title in 2020.

=== 2019–20 season: Junior international debut ===
Thorngren made her junior international debut on the Junior Grand Prix in September at the 2019 JGP Poland, where she placed eighth. In January, she won the US junior national title, earning an assignment to the 2020 World Junior Championships. She placed twenty-sixth in the short program, failing to advance to the free skate.

=== 2020–21 season ===
With the COVID-19 pandemic resulting in the cancellation of the international junior season, Thorngren's lone major appearance was in making her domestic senior debut at the 2021 U.S. Championships. She finished in sixth place.

=== 2021–22 season: World Junior bronze ===
Thorngren was a fan of the Netflix miniseries The Queen's Gambit, choosing to skate her free program to Carlos Rafael Rivera's original score for the program and portray lead character Beth Harmon. She analogized that Harmon "falls in love with chess, competes, and she fights to win a chess game. So in my program, I'm fighting to land all my jumps and skate cleanly and perform the best I can."

Returning to the Junior Grand Prix, Thorngren's first assignment was the first edition of the 2021 JGP France in Courchevel. Due to French travel rules, Russian women's skaters who normally dominated the Junior Grand Prix could not participate in the event. Thorngren won the gold medal in Courchevel. Reflecting on the lack of junior events in the previous year, she said, "since there were no competitions, I worked more on building my skills and my jumps." At her second event, the 2021 JGP Slovenia, Thorngren won the bronze medal behind Russians Adeliia Petrosian and Sofia Samodelkina. She attempted a triple Axel in the free skate, but the jump was downgraded due to a forward landing. These results qualified her for the 2021–22 Junior Grand Prix Final, but it was subsequently canceled due to restrictions imposed as a result of the Omicron variant. Thorngren made her senior international debut at the 2021 CS Warsaw Cup, where she finished fifth.

Hoping to qualify for the American Olympic team at the 2022 U.S. Championships, Thorngren was fifth in the short program with a clean skate, only 1.20 points behind third-place Alysa Liu. However, she struggled in the free skate, falling on two jumps and underrotating two others. Seventh in that segment, Thorngren dropped to fifth overall. She was subsequently assigned to the International Challenge Cup, winning the silver medal.

Thorngren was assigned to compete at the 2022 World Junior Championships, but events would soon complicate the situation. Shortly after the conclusion of the 2022 Winter Olympics, Russia invaded Ukraine. As a result, the International Skating Union banned all Russian athletes from competing at ISU championships. As Russian women had dominated international figure skating in recent years, this had a significant impact on the field, and Thorngren was considered a medal contender. Due to both the invasion and the Omicron variant, the World Junior Championships could not be held as scheduled in Sofia in early March, and were rescheduled for mid-April in Tallinn. Thorngren finished fourth in the short program, 0.14 points behind third-place Yun Ah-sun of South Korea. She went on to place third in the free skate, rising to third overall, almost four points ahead of Yun. Standing on the podium alongside fellow American, Isabeau Levito, she concurred that "the medal is a reflection of our training and how hard we've worked this season, and I'm really happy."

=== 2022–23 season ===
In her first competition of the season, Thorngren won the silver medal at the Philadelphia Summer International. She was then assigned to the 2022 CS Finlandia Trophy on the Challenger series, where she finished in sixth place.

Thorngren was invited to make her Grand Prix debut at the 2022 Skate Canada International, placing ninth of twelve skaters. She finished fourth in the short program at her second event, the 2022 Grand Prix of Espoo, but dropped to sixth place after the free skate. She went on to win the gold medal at the 2022 CS Golden Spin of Zagreb, earning a personal best in the free skate.

At the 2023 U.S. Championships, Thorngren placed sixth in the short program and fifth in the free skate, finishing sixth overall.

=== 2023–24 season: First Grand Prix medal ===
Thorngren began the season by winning gold at the 2023 Cranberry Cup International. She sustained a lower back fracture in September, and as a result did not compete on the Challenger circuit. Recovering in time to appear on the Grand Prix at the 2023 Skate Canada International, Thorngren finished fifth in the short program despite underrotating the second half of her jump combination. She remained in fifth place after the free skate. At her second assignment, the 2023 NHK Trophy, Thorngren sprained her ankle in practice before the short program, but won the segment by a margin of 5.49 points over Belgian Nina Pinzarrone. Her only mistakes in the program were an incorrect edge call on her triple flip and a point deduction for a time violation. In the free skate she doubled and fell on a planned triple Salchow and again received a flip edge call and a time violation. She finished second in the segment and second overall behind training mate Ava Marie Ziegler, with the two time violation deductions comprising more than the margin between them. Having won the silver medal, she called it an "amazing experience," and praised her team for helping her compete through the sprain.

Following the Grand Prix, Thorngren sustained injuries that forced her to suspend training for most of the period in advance of the 2024 U.S. Championships. Despite this, she was included in the preemptively-named American team for the 2024 Four Continents Championships, which were to take place the week after the national championships. Thorngren resumed training triple jumps the week prior to the national championships, where she ultimately placed seventh. She went on to finish twelfth at the Four Continents Championships.

=== 2024–25 season ===
Thorngren started the season by competing at the 2024 CS Budapest Trophy, finishing fourth. Going on to compete on the 2024–25 Grand Prix series, she would finish ninth at the 2024 NHK Trophy and the 2024 Finlandia Trophy.

Thorngren finished the season with a twelfth-place finish at the 2025 U.S. Championships.

On June 6, 2025, she has been removed from the World Standings list and is no longer in the Team USA International Selection Pool. Since then, she began coaching at the Montclair State University Ice Arena.

== Programs ==
Season	Short program	Free skating	Exhibition
2019–20	Papa, Can You Hear Me? (from Glee) performed by Lea Michelle choreo. by Nikolai Morozov & Nina Petrenko	Lovers by Jackie Evancho choreo. by Nikolai Morozov & Nina Petrenko	
2020–21	Writing's on the Wall (from Spectre) by Sam Smith performed by Sofia Karlberg choreo. by Nina Petrenko	Bacchanale (from Samson and Delilah) by Camille Saint-Saëns choreo. by Nina Petrenko	
2021–22	Writing's on the Wall (from Spectre) by Sam Smith performed by Sofia Karlberg choreo. by Nina Petrenko	Beth's Story; Ceiling Games; Main Title (from The Queen's Gambit) by Carlos Rafael Rivera choreo. by Benoît Richaud	
2022–23	Concierto de Aranjuez by Joaquín Rodrigo performed by Guadalupe Pineda arranged by Cédric Tour choreo. by Benoît Richaud, Nina Petrenko	An Amalgamation Waltz by Joep Beving; Often a Bird by Wim Mertens; Nostos by Jean-Michel Blais arranged by Cédric Tour choreo. by Benoît Richaud, Nina Petrenko	
2023–24	The Windmills of Your Mind by Michel Legrand performed by Venus choreo. by Sandra Bezic	Twilight; New Moon (The Meadow) by Alexandre Desplat; How I Would Die by Carter Burwell; Cold by Aqualung and Lucy Schwartz; Exit Run 44 by Ezio Bosso choreo. by Shae-Lynn Bourne	What Was I Made For? (from Barbie) by Billie Eilish
2024–25	The Windmills of Your Mind by Michel Legrand performed by Venus choreo. by Sandra Bezic	Movement by Hozier choreo. by David Wilson & Sandra Bezic	

== Competitive highlights ==
- GP – Event of the ISU Grand Prix Series
- CS – Event of the ISU Challenger Series
- JGP – Event of the ISU Junior Grand Prix Series
- TBD – Assigned
- WD – Withdrew from competition

Competition placements at senior level
Season	2020–21	2021–22	2022–23	2023–24	2024–25
Four Continents Championships				12th	
U.S. Championships	6th	5th	6th	7th	12th
GP Finland			6th		9th
GP NHK Trophy				2nd	9th
GP Skate Canada			9th	5th	
CS Budapest Trophy					4th
CS Finlandia Trophy			6th		
CS Golden Spin of Zagreb			1st		
CS Warsaw Cup		5th			
Challenge Cup		2nd			
Cranberry Cup				1st	
Philadelphia Summer			2nd		

Competition placements at junior level
Season	2019–20	2021–22
World Junior Championships	26th	3rd
U.S. Championships	1st	
JGP France		1st
JGP Slovenia		3rd
JGP Poland	8th	

== Detailed results ==
ISU personal best scores in the +5/-5 GOE System
Segment	Type	Score	Event
Total	TSS	199.42	2022 World Junior Championships
Short program	TSS	70.24	2021 JGP Slovenia
Short program	TES	40.90	2021 JGP Slovenia
Short program	PCS	31.19	2023 NHK Trophy
Free skating	TSS	135.99	2022 CS Golden Spin of Zagreb
Free skating	TES	72.72	2022 CS Golden Spin of Zagreb
Free skating	PCS	63.79	2023 NHK Trophy

=== Senior level ===
Results in the 2020–21 season
Date	Event	SP		FS		Total	
Date	Event	P	Score	P	Score	P	Score
Jan 11–21, 2021	(United States) 2021 U.S. Championships	6	62.54	7	116.35	6	178.89

Results in the 2021–22 season
Date	Event	SP		FS		Total	
Date	Event	P	Score	P	Score	P	Score
Nov 17–20, 2021	(Poland) 2021 CS Warsaw Cup	8	60.75	4	123.65	5	184.40
Jan 3–9, 2022	(United States) 2022 U.S. Championships	5	70.22	7	116.16	5	186.38
Feb 24–27, 2022	(Netherlands) 2022 International Challenge Cup	4	54.87	2	131.35	2	186.22

Results in the 2022–23 season
Date	Event	SP		FS		Total	
Date	Event	P	Score	P	Score	P	Score
Aug 4–7, 2022	(United States) 2022 Philadelphia Summer International	2	69.57	2	134.05	2	203.62
Oct 4–9, 2022	(Finland) 2022 CS Finlandia Trophy	14	52.86	5	112.23	6	165.09
Oct 28–30, 2022	2022 Skate Canada International	10	55.16	6	120.93	9	176.09
Nov 25–27, 2022	(Finland) 2022 Grand Prix of Espoo	4	65.75	6	117.48	6	183.23
Dec 7–10, 2022	(Croatia) 2022 CS Golden Spin of Zagreb	2	60.49	1	135.99	1	196.48
Jan 23–29, 2023	(United States) 2023 U.S. Championships	6	62.64	5	124.55	6	187.19

Results in the 2023–24 season
Date	Event	SP		FS		Total	
Date	Event	P	Score	P	Score	P	Score
Aug 9–13, 2023	(United States) 2023 Cranberry Cup International	2	66.43	1	132.73	1	199.16
Oct 27–29, 2023	2023 Skate Canada International	5	61.99	5	127.53	5	189.52
Nov 24–26, 2023	(Japan) 2023 NHK Trophy	1	68.93	3	129.80	2	198.73
Jan 22–28, 2024	(United States) 2024 U.S. Championships	4	65.33	8	115.65	7	180.98
Jan 30 – Feb 4, 2024	(China) 2024 Four Continents Championships	7	64.11	12	98.52	12	162.63

Results in the 2024–25 season
Date	Event	SP		FS		Total	
Date	Event	P	Score	P	Score	P	Score
Oct 11–13, 2024	(Hungary) 2024 CS Budapest Trophy	2	66.19	4	113.26	4	179.45
Nov 8–10, 2024	(Japan) 2024 NHK Trophy	10	54.79	7	114.24	9	169.03
Nov 15–17, 2024	(Finland) 2024 Finlandia Trophy	8	57.37	9	113.27	9	170.64
Jan 20–26, 2025	(United States) 2025 U.S. Championships	9	60.99	12	98.89	12	159.88

=== Junior level ===
Results in the 2019–20 season
Date	Event	SP		FS		Total	
Date	Event	P	Score	P	Score	P	Score
Sep 18–21, 2019	2019 JGP Poland	8	57.44	9	100.65	8	158.09
Jan 20–26, 2020	(United States) 2020 U.S. Championships (Junior)	2	59.66	1	124.10	1	183.76
Mar 2–8, 2020	(Estonia) 2020 World Junior Championships	26	49.61	—N/a	—N/a	26	49.61

Results in the 2021–22 season
Date	Event	SP		FS		Total	
Date	Event	P	Score	P	Score	P	Score
Aug 18–21, 2021	2021 JGP France I	2	62.63	1	118.82	1	181.45
Sep 22–25, 2021	2021 JGP Slovenia	3	70.24	3	123.53	3	193.77
Apr 13–17, 2022	(Estonia) 2022 World Junior Championships	4	66.14	3	133.28	3	199.42
