= Philadelphia Summer Championships =

The Philadelphia Summer Championships are an annual figure skating competition sponsored by the IceWorks Skating Club in Philadelphia, Pennsylvania. In 2015 and 2017, it was included on the International Skating Union's official calendar. Medals may be awarded in men's and women's singles.

The 2024 Philadelphia Summer Championships took place July 31st, 2024, through August 4th.

== Senior results ==
=== Men's singles ===
Year	Gold	Silver	Bronze	Ref.
2015	(Israel) Daniel Samohin	(United States) Patrick Rupp	(Canada) Shaquille Davis	
2017	(United States) Timothy Dolensky	(Ukraine) Yaroslav Paniot	(United States) Max Aaron	
2018	(United States) Andrew Torgashev	(United States) Jimmy Ma	(United States) Timothy Dolensky	
2019	(United States) Andrew Torgashev	(Mexico) Donovan Carrillo	(United States) Alexei Krasnozhon	
2022	(United States) Liam Kapeikis	(United States) Dinh Tran	(Canada) Gabriel Blumenthal	
2024	(United States) Beck Strommer	(United States) Liam Kapeikis	(United States) Joseph Klein	

=== Women's singles ===
Year	Gold	Silver	Bronze	Ref.
2015	(Canada) Véronik Mallet	(Brazil) Isadora Williams	(Canada) Roxanne Rheault	
2017	(United States) Bradie Tennell	(United States) Angela Wang	(South Korea) Kim Ha-nul	
2018	(United States) Katie McBeath	(United States) Akari Nakahara	(United States) Brynne McIsaac	
2019	(South Korea) You Young	(United States) Karen Chen	(United States) Hanna Harrell	
2022	(United States) Isabeau Levito	(United States) Lindsay Thorngren	(United States) Gracie Gold	
2024	(United States) Amy Sn Yang	(United States) Ting Cui	(United States) Lindsey Byer	

== Junior results ==
=== Men's singles ===
Year	Gold	Silver	Bronze	Ref.
2015	(United States) Alexei Krasnozhon	(United States) Oleksiy Melnyk	(United States) Tony Lu	
2017	(United States) Ryan Dunk	(United States) Maxim Naumov	(United States) Joseph Kang	
2019	(United States) Ilia Malinin	(United States) Nicholas Hsieh	(Australia) Darian Kaptich	
2022	(United States) Robert Yampolsky	(Israel) Nikita Kovalenko	(Israel) Lev Vinokur	
2024	(United States) Caleb Farrington	(Canada) Neo Tran	(Canada) Travis Trang	

=== Women's singles ===
Year	Gold	Silver	Bronze	Ref.
2015	(United States) Brynne McIsaac	(United States) Cailey Weaver	(Canada) Justine Belzile	
2017	(United States) Ting Cui	(United States) Paige Rydberg	(South Korea) Lee Ji-won	
2019	(United States) Isabelle Inthisone	(United States) Audrey Shin	(United States) Calista Choi	
2022	(United States) Sarah Everhardt	(United States) Mia Barghout	(United States) Katie Krafchik	
2024	(United States) Sofia Bezkorovainaya	(United States) Jiaying Ellyse Johnson	(Canada) Calissa Adlem	
