= Anastasiia Golubeva =

Russian-Australian pair skater

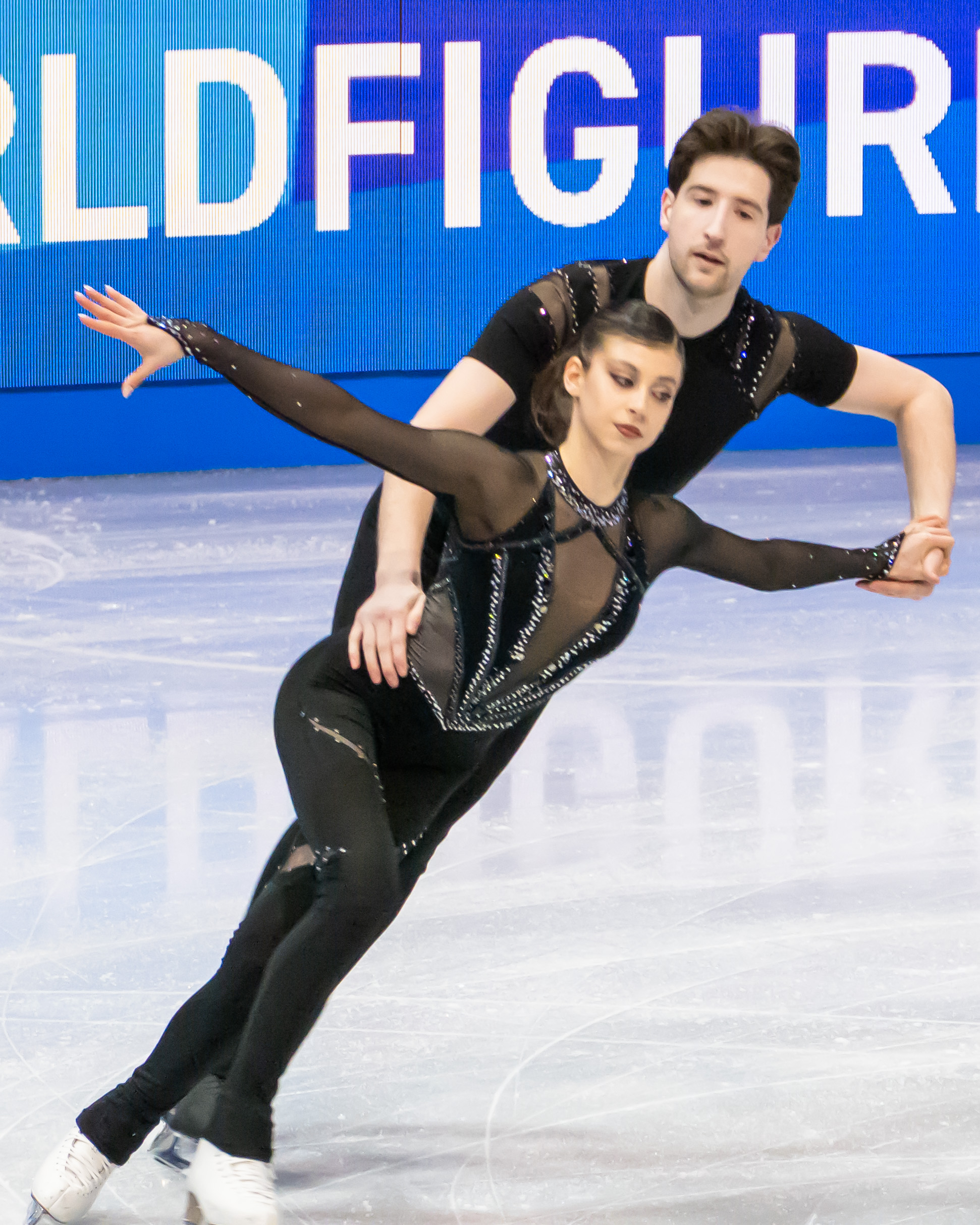
- Anastasiia Golubeva and Hektor Giatopoulos Moore performing their short program at the 2025 World Championships

Personal information
- Native name: Анастасия Игоревна Голубева
- Full name: Anastasiia Igorevna Golubeva
- Other names: Anastasia
- Born: 3 January 2006 (age 20) Moscow, Russia
- Home town: Balashikha, Russia
- Height: 1.57 m (5 ft 2 in)

Figure skating career
- Country: Australia
- Partner: Hektor Giotopoulos Moore (2019–26)
- Coach: Galina Pachina; Andrei Pachin
- Skating club: Sydney Figure Skating Club

Medal record
Australian Championships
| Gold medal – first place | 2023 Erina | Pairs |
World Junior Championships
| Silver medal – second place | 2022 Tallinn | Pairs |
| Silver medal – second place | 2023 Calgary | Pairs |
Junior Grand Prix Final
| Gold medal – first place | 2022–23 Turin | Pairs |

Anastasiia Igorevna Golubeva (Russian: Анастасия Игоревна Голубева, born 3 January 2006) is a Russian-Australian pair skater. With her skating partner, Hektor Giotopoulos Moore, she is the 2024 Skate Canada bronze medalist, 2022 CS Warsaw Cup champion, and 2023 Australian National champion. The pair represented Australia at the 2026 Winter Olympics.

On the junior level, Golubeva and Giotopoulos Moore are two-time World Junior silver medalists (2022 and 2023) and the 2022–23 Junior Grand Prix Final champions.

== Personal life ==
Golubeva was born on January 3, 2006, in Moscow, Russia. Her older sister, Maria, is also a former competitive figure skater who now coaches.

She became a permanent resident of Australia in May 2025 and a citizen in December 2025.

In addition, Golubeva looks up to pair teams, Tatiana Volosozhar/Maxim Trankov and Aliona Savchenko/Bruno Massot.

== Career ==
=== Early career ===
Following the construction of a skating rink in Golubeva's hometown of Balashikha, her father decided to enroll her older sister there. Golubeva would meanwhile sit rinkside and watch her sister train, before deciding that she wanted to learn how to skate as well. Her parents would eventually enroll her into skating by the age of three. Marina Dezhina was her first coach.

Golubeva originally competed as a singles skater until fall 2019 when she and Dezhina were contacted by Galina Pachina and Andrei Pachin, asking if she would be interested in trying out for pair skating with Australian pair skater, Hektor Giotopoulos Moore. Deciding to give it a try, Golubeva immediately fell in love with the discipline, and decided to team up with Giotopoulos Moore and skate for Australia with him. Initially, wanting to finish the 2019–20 figure skating season, Golubeva continued participating in women's singles skating at Russian domestic competitions while simultaneously beginning to train in pairs with Giotopoulos Moore.

In February 2020, the COVID-19 pandemic hit while Giotopoulos Moore was training with Golubeva in Moscow, and Golubeva had yet to obtain a visa to relocate to Australia. Due to lockdowns, Golubeva/Giotopoulos Moore were unable to use Russian ice rinks to train so instead, they would meet every day in a closed restaurant to practice off-ice training. When Giatopoulos Moore's visa began to expire, the pair temporarily relocated to Belarus due to the country allowing three-month visa-free entry.

The team would finally relocate to Sydney, Australia after the country re-opened its borders. Reflecting on being fifteen years old and moving to a foreign country, Golubeva said in 2024, "I was so scared to move to Australia alone, with no family there. I was scared. It was the first time I was leaving my family, and I was going to a country that had a completely different culture and a different language. At first, it was quite difficult. What helped was, of course, figure skating: focusing on my routine and making sure I was mentally healthy. I didn’t know many people. The only people I knew were Hektor and our coaches... I lived with Hektor’s family, so it was super-nice. Hektor’s mom is like my second mom."

=== Partnership with Hektor Giotopoulos Moore ===
==== 2021–22 season: Debut of Golubeva/Giotopoulos Moore, World Junior Championships silver ====
Golubeva/Giotopoulos Moore debuted as a pair team on the 2021–22 ISU Junior Grand Prix and finished fifth at both their ISU Junior Grand Prix events in Russia and Austria. The pair would also go on to compete at the senior level the 2021–22 Challenger Series, placing eighth at the 2021 Nebelhorn Trophy and tenth at the 2021 Golden Spin of Zagreb. At the 2022 Winter Star in Minsk, Belarus, Golubeva/Giotopoulos Moore would win the gold medal.

Although the pair were assigned to compete at the 2022 World Championships in Montpellier, their plans were disrupted by the Russian invasion of Ukraine. Due to Golubeva's Russian citizenship, they were unable to have a visa processed in time to travel to France, and withdrew from the event.

As a further result of the invasion, the International Skating Union banned all Russian and Belarusian skaters from participating in international competitions, which had a significant impact on the international pairs field. Golubeva/Giotopoulos Moore were assigned as well to the 2022 World Junior Championships, initially scheduled to be held in Sofia in March. However, due to both the invasion and COVID pandemic issues, Bulgaria renounced hosting the event, which was rescheduled for Tallinn in April. Golubeva/Giotopoulos Moore placed second in the short program. They were second in the free skate as well, despite some minor errors, winning the silver medal. Golubeva said afterward that "this is my first medal. We have some little mistakes in the program, but overall we're very happy." They became the third Australian pair team to win a World Junior medal, after Cain/Cain in 1976 and Alexandrovskaya/Windsor in 2017.

==== 2022–23 season: World Junior Championships silver, Junior Grand Prix Final champion ====
Although Golubeva/Giotopoulos Moore were selected to compete on the Grand Prix circuit at 2022 Skate America and 2022 Grand Prix of Espoo, the pair elected to compete on the 2022–23 Junior Grand Prix instead. They were assigned to both Polish JGP events in Gdańsk, arriving at the first as the favourites to win, which they did by a wide margin. The gold medal was their first JGP medal. The following weekend they won their second event as well, despite a number of errors that caused Giotopoulos Mooere to say it "wasn't as good as last week." Their results qualified them for the 2022–23 Junior Grand Prix Final in Turin, Italy.

Following the Junior Grand Prix, the pair also competed at the 2022 Warsaw Cup, which they won. At the JGP Final, Golubeva/Giotopoulos Moore placed second in the short program after Golubeva struggled to cleanly land the throw triple toe-loop, but the pair would go on to deliver a strong free skate and take the gold medal. After their free skate comeback, Golubeva said that they "tried to give all the strength we had to put into this program." Theirs was the second Junior Grand Prix Final title for an Australian pair, after Alexandrovskaya/Windsor.

Although assigned to compete at the 2023 Four Continents Championships, Golubeva/Giotopoulos Moore withdrew from the event due to Golubeva being unable to obtain an American visa to compete in Colorado Springs, Colorado. At the 2023 World Junior Championships in Calgary, Alberta, they placed second in the short program after unexpectedly missing their death spiral. The pair were able to deliver a solid free skate, however, and win the silver medal behind Americans Baram/Tioumentsev. Giotopoulos Moore called it "a huge achievement for us and we are very happy."

Making their World Championship debut at the 2023 World Championships in Saitama, Japan, the pair placed eleventh in the short program after Golubeva fell on a throw triple loop attempt but the pair would go on to deliver an almost-perfect free skate, earning a new personal best and placing fifth in that segment of the competition, moving up to eighth-place overall. Golubeva said that they had achieved their goal of a top ten placement, adding they were "so happy and thrilled" with how they had skated.

Following the season, Golubeva/Giatopoulos Moore and their coach, Galina Pachina, relocated to Montreal, Quebec, Canada, due to the suboptimal training conditions in Sydney. The pair began training at the École de Patinage Artistique Julie Marcotte Ste-Julie, the same training rink as Canadian pair team, Deanna Stellato-Dudek/Maxime Deschamps.

==== 2023–24 season: Australian national title, Grand Prix debut ====
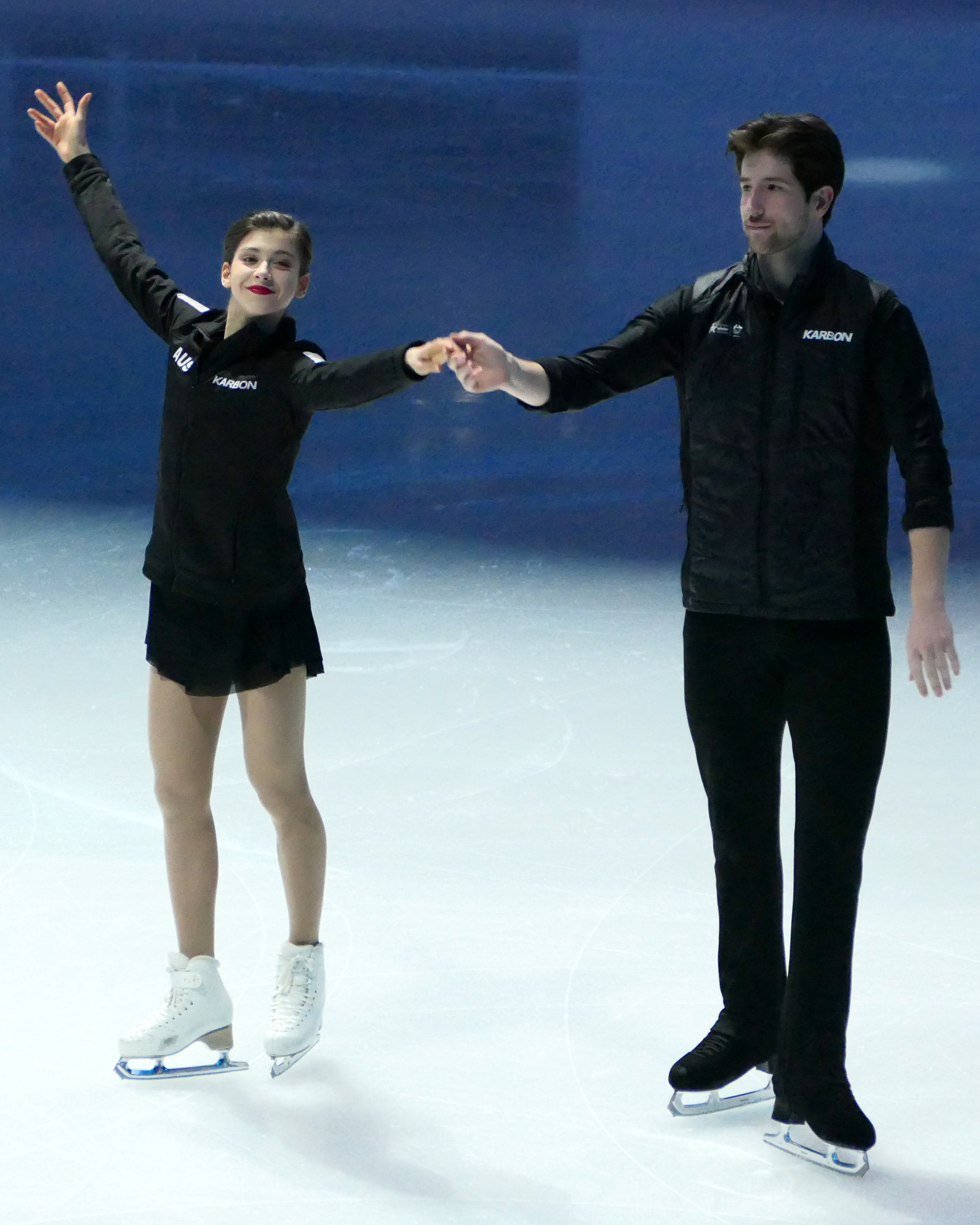
Golubeva and Giotopoulos Moore before their short program at the 2024 World Championships

With Giotopoulos Moore aging out of junior eligibility, the team planned for its first full senior season, primarily training in Australia for Golubeva's residency purposes, but also spending time in Montreal due to the coach's belief they needed to train with other high-level pair skaters, and Russia's being difficult to train in at the time. They were invited to participate in the Shanghai Trophy, finishing fourth.

Golubeva/Giotopoulos Moore made their senior Grand Prix debut at the 2023 Skate Canada International. They placed third in both segments of the competition, but finished fourth overall, less than two points behind bronze medalists Beccari/Guarise of Italy. Despite several errors in their free skate, they considered it an improvement on their earlier performances, with Golubeva saying "we are looking forward to growing this program." At the 2023 NHK Trophy they finished third in the short program, but dropped to fourth place after the free skate. They said they considered their first Grand Prix season a valuable experience given its much greater professionalism in comparison to the Junior Grand Prix.

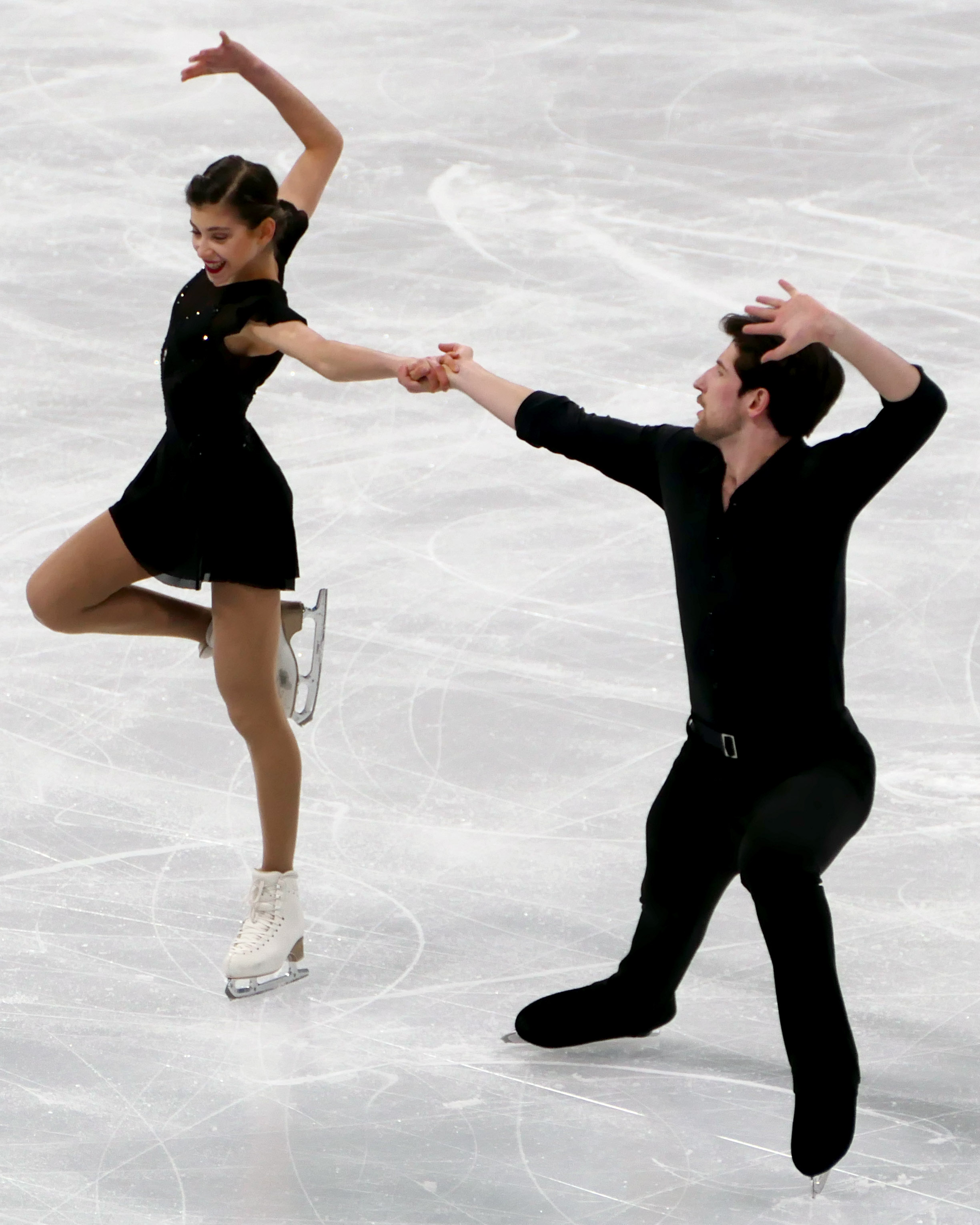
Golubeva and Giotopoulos Moore during their short program at the 2024 World Championships

For the first time in their partnership, the team was able to compete at a domestic championships, winning the Australian national title. At the 2024 Four Continents Championships in Shanghai, Golubeva/Giotopoulos Moore were seventh in the short program after she fell on a jump. They rallied in the free skate, coming fourth in that segment and moving up to fourth overall. The two said that they were pleased at their ability to recover from a disappointing short program. The team went on to compete at the 2024 World Championships in Montreal, where they came in tenth.

==== 2024–25 season: Grand Prix bronze ====
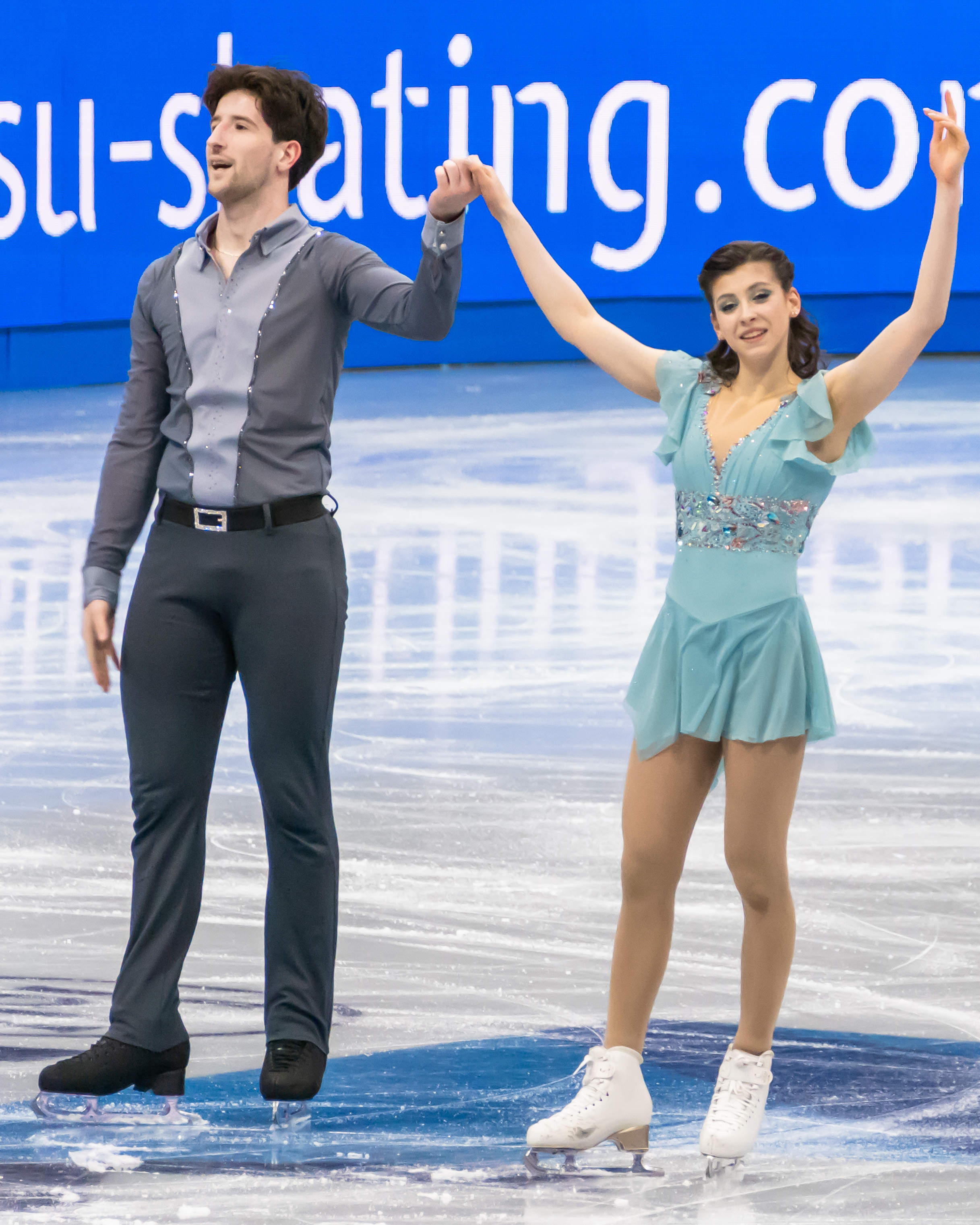
Golubeva and Giotopoulos Moore after their free skate at 2025 World Championships

In early fall, Giatopoulos Moore struggled with back problems, thus the team did not get to compete until late October. Beginning the season by competing on the 2024–25 Grand Prix series, at their first event, 2024 Skate Canada International, the pair won the bronze medal, making history as the first skaters from Australia in any discipline to win a senior Grand Prix medal. Although the pair were also assigned to compete at the 2024 Finlandia Trophy, however, they were forced to withdraw due to Golubeva falling ill with COVID-19.

In February, the pair competed at the 2025 Four Continents Championships in Seoul, South Korea, where they placed sixth in the short program and seventh in the free skate, finishing sixth overall. The following month, Golubeva/Giatopoulos Moore competed at the 2025 World Championships in Boston, Massachusetts, United States. They scored a new personal best in the short program, placing eighth in that segment and placing ninth in the free skate, finishing in ninth place overall. With this placement, Golubeva/Giatopoulos Moore won Australia a quota for pair skating at the 2026 Winter Olympics.

==== 2025–2026 season: Injury struggles, Milano Cortina Olympics ====
Although Golubeva/Giatopoulos Moore were assigned to compete at the 2025 Grand Prix de France and 2025 Skate Canada International, they opted to withdraw from both events to allow Golubeva to focus on meeting the residency requirements to obtaining Australian citizenship. During this period, the pair also had to deal with injuries, including Golubeva sustaining a concussion during training.

They returned to competition at the 2025 CS Golden Spin of Zagreb in December but withdrew following the short program. The following month, they competed at the 2026 Four Continents Championships in Beijing, China, where they finished eleventh of the eleven competitors.

== Programs ==
=== Pair skating with Hektor Giotopoulos Moore ===
| Season | Short program | Free skating | Exhibition |
|---|---|---|---|
| 2025–2026 | Exogenesis: Symphony Part 3: Redemption by Muse choreo. by Igor Tchiniaev | Penny Dreadful; Abomination; Demimonde (Main Title); Verbis Diablo; Closer Than Sisters by Abel Korzeniowski choreo. by Julie Marcotte | |
| 2024–2025 | Exogenesis: Symphony Part 3: Redemption; Won't Stand Down by Muse choreo. by Igor Tchiniaev | The Umbrellas of Cherbourg by Michel Legrand; Final performed by José Bartel & Danielle Licari; The Umbrellas of Cherbourg performed by John Williams, Itzhak Perlman, & Pittsburgh Symphony Orchestra; La gare (Guy s'en va) performed by José Bartel & Danielle Licari; Générique by Michel Legrand choreo. by Jonathan Guerreiro | |
| 2023–2024 | Architect of the Mind by Kerry Muzzey choreo. by Jonathan Guerreiro | The Umbrellas of Cherbourg by Michel Legrand; Final performed by José Bartel & Danielle Licari; The Umbrellas of Cherbourg performed by John Williams, Itzhak Perlman, & Pittsburgh Symphony Orchestra; La gare (Guy s'en va) performed by José Bartel & Danielle Licari; Générique by Michel Legrand choreo. by Jonathan Guerreiro | Another Love by Tom Odell |
| 2022–2023 | Architect of the Mind by Kerry Muzzey choreo. by Jonathan Guerreiro | Sing, Sing, Sing by Louis Prima; Summertime performed by Ella Fitzgerald; Mr. Pinstripe Suit by Big Bad Voodoo Daddy choreo. by Galina Pachina | Another Love by Tom Odell |
| 2021–2022 | Fire Dance by Jennifer Thomas choreo. by Galina Pachina | Sing, Sing, Sing by Louis Prima; Summertime performed by Ella Fitzgerald; Mr. Pinstripe Suit by Big Bad Voodoo Daddy choreo. by Galina Pachina | |

== Competitive highlights ==
=== Pair skating with Hektor Giotopoulos Moore ===
- GP – Event of the ISU Grand Prix Series
- JGP – Event of the ISU Junior Grand Prix Series
- CS – Event of the ISU Challenger Series
- TBD – Assigned
- WD – Withdrew from competition

Competition placements at senior level
| Season | 2021–22 | 2022–23 | 2023–24 | 2024–25 | 2025–26 |
|---|---|---|---|---|---|
| Winter Olympics | | | | | 18th |
| World Championships | | 8th | 10th | 9th | WD |
| Four Continents Championships | | | 4th | 6th | 11th |
| Australian Championships | | | 1st | | |
| GP NHK Trophy | | | 4th | | |
| GP Skate Canada | | | 4th | 3rd | |
| CS Golden Spin of Zagreb | 10th | | | | WD |
| CS Nebelhorn Trophy | 8th | | | | |
| CS Warsaw Cup | | 1st | | | |
| Shanghai Trophy | | | 4th | | |

Competition placements at junior level
| Season | 2021–22 | 2022–23 |
|---|---|---|
| World Junior Championships | 2nd | 2nd |
| Junior Grand Prix Final | | 1st |
| JGP Austria | 5th | |
| JGP Poland I | | 1st |
| JGP Poland II | | 1st |
| JGP Russia | 5th | |
| Winter Star | 1st | |

== Detailed results ==
=== Pair skating with Hektor Giotopoulos Moore ===
ISU personal best scores in the +5/-5 GOE System
| Segment | Type | Score | Event |
|---|---|---|---|
| Total | TSS | 189.47 | 2023 World Championships |
| Short program | TSS | 65.73 | 2025 World Championships |
| Short program | TES | 36.46 | 2025 World Championships |
| Short program | PCS | 29.64 | 2025 Four Continents Championships |
| Free skating | TSS | 127.52 | 2023 World Championships |
| Free skating | TES | 68.03 | 2023 World Championships |
| Free skating | PCS | 61.04 | 2024 Skate Canada International |

- Small medals for the short program and free skating are only awarded at ISU Championships.

==== Senior level ====
Results in the 2021–22 season
| Date | Event | SP | | FS | | Total | |
| Date | Event | P | Score | P | Score | P | Score |
|---|---|---|---|---|---|---|---|
| Sep 22–25, 2021 | (Germany) 2021 CS Nebelhorn Trophy | 13 | 49.55 | 8 | 99.80 | 8 | 149.35 |
| Dec 7–11, 2021 | (Croatia) 2021 CS Golden Spin of Zagreb | 13 | 53.41 | 9 | 110.16 | 10 | 163.57 |

Results in the 2022–23 season
| Date | Event | SP | | FS | | Total | |
| Date | Event | P | Score | P | Score | P | Score |
|---|---|---|---|---|---|---|---|
| Nov 17–20, 2022 | (Poland) 2022 CS Warsaw Cup | 2 | 63.62 | 1 | 121.91 | 1 | 185.53 |
| Mar 22–26, 2023 | (Japan) 2023 World Championships | 11 | 61.95 | 5 | 127.52 | 8 | 189.47 |

Results in the 2023–24 season
| Date | Event | SP | | FS | | Total | |
| Date | Event | P | Score | P | Score | P | Score |
|---|---|---|---|---|---|---|---|
| Oct 3–5, 2023 | (China) 2023 Shanghai Trophy | 1 | 63.51 | 4 | 97.71 | 4 | 161.22 |
| Oct 27–29, 2023 | 2023 Skate Canada International | 3 | 62.80 | 3 | 116.81 | 4 | 179.61 |
| Nov 24–26, 2023 | (Japan) 2023 NHK Trophy | 3 | 64.61 | 4 | 120.78 | 4 | 185.39 |
| Dec 2–8, 2023 | (Australia) 2023 Australian Championships | 1 | 65.94 | 1 | 124.62 | 1 | 190.56 |
| Jan 30, 2023 – Feb 4, 2024 | (China) 2024 Four Continents Championships | 7 | 58.79 | 4 | 125.04 | 4 | 183.83 |
| Mar 18–24, 2024 | (Canada) 2024 World Championships | 11 | 63.35 | 8 | 119.36 | 10 | 182.71 |

Results in the 2024–25 season
| Date | Event | SP | | FS | | Total | |
| Date | Event | P | Score | P | Score | P | Score |
|---|---|---|---|---|---|---|---|
| Oct 25–27, 2024 | 2024 Skate Canada International | 3 | 64.81 | 3 | 121.33 | 3 | 186.14 |
| Feb 19–23, 2025 | (South Korea) 2025 Four Continents Championships | 6 | 65.36 | 7 | 113.40 | 6 | 178.76 |
| Mar 25–30, 2025 | (United States) 2025 World Championships | 8 | 65.73 | 9 | 122.51 | 9 | 188.24 |

Results in the 2025–26 season
| Date | Event | SP | | FS | | Total | |
| Date | Event | P | Score | P | Score | P | Score |
|---|---|---|---|---|---|---|---|
| Dec 3–6, 2025 | (Croatia) 2025 CS Golden Spin of Zagreb | 12 | 49.01 | —N/a | —N/a | WD | —N/a |
| Jan 21–25, 2026 | (China) 2026 Four Continents Championships | 8 | 59.27 | 11 | 82.68 | 11 | 141.95 |
| Feb 15-16, 2026 | (Italy) 2026 Winter Olympics | 18 | 60.69 | —N/a | —N/a | 18 | 60.69 |

==== Junior level ====
Results in the 2021–22 season
| Date | Event | SP | | FS | | Total | |
| Date | Event | P | Score | P | Score | P | Score |
|---|---|---|---|---|---|---|---|
| Sep 15–18, 2021 | 2021 JGP Russia | 5 | 57.35 | 5 | 101.33 | 5 | 158.68 |
| Oct 6–9, 2021 | 2021 JGP Austria | 5 | 53.04 | 4 | 107.12 | 5 | 160.16 |
| Feb 10–13, 2022 | (Belarus) 2022 Winter Star | 1 | 56.22 | 2 | 98.36 | 1 | 154.58 |
| Apr 13–17, 2023 | (Estonia) 2022 World Junior Championships | 2 | 61.72 | 2 | 108.19 | 2 | 169.91 |

Results in the 2022–23 season
| Date | Event | SP | | FS | | Total | |
| Date | Event | P | Score | P | Score | P | Score |
|---|---|---|---|---|---|---|---|
| Sep 28 – Oct 1, 2022 | 2022 JGP Poland I | 1 | 58.03 | 1 | 108.53 | 1 | 166.56 |
| Oct 5–8, 2022 | 2022 JGP Poland II | 1 | 59.90 | 1 | 101.27 | 1 | 161.17 |
| Dec 8–11, 2022 | (Italy) 2022–23 Junior Grand Prix Final | 2 | 60.19 | 1 | 121.18 | 1 | 181.37 |
| Feb 27 – Mar 5, 2023 | (Canada) 2023 World Junior Championships | 3 | 59.18 | 2 | 111.18 | 2 | 170.36 |
