= 2023 U.S. Figure Skating Championships =

Figure skating competition

- Type: National championship
- Date: January 23 – 29
- Season: 2022–23
- Location: San Jose, California
- Host: U.S. Figure Skating
- Venue: SAP Center

Champions
- Men's singles: Ilia Malinin (Senior) & Lucas Broussard (Junior)
- Women's singles: Isabeau Levito (Senior) & Soho Lee (Junior)
- Pairs: Alexa Knierim and Brandon Frazier (Senior) & Ellie Korytek and Timmy Chapman (Junior)
- Ice dance: Madison Chock and Evan Bates (Senior) & Leah Neset and Artem Markelov (Junior)
- Previous: 2022 U.S. Championships
- Next: 2024 U.S. Championships

The 2023 U.S. Figure Skating Championships were held January 23–29, 2023, at the SAP Center in San Jose, California. Medals were awarded in the disciplines of men's singles, women's singles, pair skating, and ice dance at the senior and junior levels. The results were part of the U.S. selection criteria for the 2023 World Championships, 2023 World Junior Championships, the 2023 Four Continents Championship, and the 2023 World Team Trophy.

San Jose was originally scheduled to host the 2021 event, but it was relocated to Las Vegas. San Jose was then awarded the 2023 Championships instead. It was the fourth time the city hosted the event.

== Qualifying ==
Skaters qualify for Nationals by competing in the National Qualifying Series, a series of competitions that allow skaters to qualify for the Sectionals, U.S. Pairs Final and U.S. Ice Dance Final in November.

=== Advancement to Nationals ===
Skaters advance to Nationals by either having a bye or competing at Sectionals Singles, U.S. Pairs or U.S. Ice Dance Finals.

If the maximum number of competitors isn't reached through byes, additional spots will be available at the Championship Series. Competitors from the Championship Series will be selected on the next best total combined score. If the number of athletes with three international competitions from the approved competition list exceeds the number of available byes (4 for senior singles, 3 for senior pairs, and 5 for senior ice dance, 3 for all junior disciplines), byes will be awarded based on highest to lowest total score in the following order of importance:

- ISU Grand Prix of Figure Skating
- ISU Junior Grand Prix
- ISU Challenger Series

There will be a minimum required score for all athletes to compete to be decided in the fall of 2022. Approved international competitions applicable for byes are the Grand Prix Series, Junior Grand Prix Series, Challenger Series, and Junior and Senior Grand Prix Final.

==== Seniors ====
===== Singles =====
Singles skaters can advance to Nationals in the following ways:

- Top 5 finish at the 2021 Toyota U.S. Figure Skating Championships
- 2022 U.S. Figure Skating World Team Members (not including alternates)
- Athletes who have won a medal in the singles event at the most recent Olympic Winter Games
- Qualifying for the same event at the ISU Grand Prix of Figure Skating Final or the ISU Junior Grand Prix of Figure Skating Final
- Athletes who are assigned to and compete at three international assignments classified as an ISU Grand Prix, ISU Junior Grand Prix, and or ISU Challenger Series event
- The top two total combined scores from each section in the Sectional Singles Final
- Plus, next-best scores nationwide until the maximum is met

There will be a maximum of 18 spots.

===== Pairs =====
Pairs can advance to Nationals in the following ways:

- Top 5 finish at the 2021 Toyota U.S. Figure Skating
- 2021 U.S. Figure Skating World Team Members (not including alternates)
- Medalists in the pairs event at the most recent Olympic Winter Games
- Qualifying for the same event at the ISU Grand Prix of Figure Skating Final or the ISU Junior Grand Prix of Figure Skating Final
- Athletes who are assigned to and compete at three international assignments classified as an ISU Grand Prix, ISU Junior Grand Prix, and or ISU Challenger Series event
- The top four scores from the nation in the U.S. Pairs Final
- Plus, next-best scores at the U.S. Pairs Final until the maximum is met

There will be a maximum of 12 spots.

===== Ice dance =====
Ice dance teams can advance to Nationals in the following ways:

- Top 5 finish at the 2021 Toyota U.S. Figure Skating
- 2021 U.S. Figure Skating World Team Members (not including alternates)
- Medalists in the ice dance event at the most recent Olympic Winter Games
- Qualifying for the same event at the ISU Grand Prix of Figure Skating Final or the ISU Junior Grand Prix of Figure Skating Final
- Athletes who are assigned to and compete at three international assignments classified as an ISU Grand Prix, ISU Junior Grand Prix, and or ISU Challenger Series event
- The top five total combined scores from the nation in the U.S. Ice Dance Final

Plus, next-best scores at the U.S. Ice Dance Final until the maximum is met

There will be a maximum of 15 spots.

==== Juniors ====
===== Singles =====
Singles skaters can advance to Nationals in the following ways:

- Qualifying for the same event at the ISU Junior Grand Prix of Figure Skating Final
- Athletes who are assigned to and compete at three international assignments classified as an ISU Junior Grand Prix, and or ISU Challenger Series event
- The top four total combined scores from each section in the Sectional Singles Final
- The top two total combined novice scores from each section in the Sectional Singles Final

There will be a maximum of 18 spots.

===== Pairs =====
Pairs can advance to Nationals in the following ways:

- Qualifying for the same event at the ISU Junior Grand Prix of Figure Skating Final
- Athletes who are assigned to and compete at three international assignments classified as an ISU Junior Grand Prix, and or ISU Challenger Series event
- The top nine total combined scores from each section in the U.S. Pairs Final
- Plus, next-best teams from the U.S. Pairs Final until the maximum is met

There will be a maximum of 12 spots.

===== Ice dance =====
Ice dance teams can advance to Nationals in the following ways:

- Qualifying for the same event at the ISU Junior Grand Prix of Figure Skating Final
- Athletes who are assigned to and compete at three international assignments classified as an ISU Junior Grand Prix, and or ISU Challenger Series event
- The top twelve total combined scores from each section in the U.S. Ice Dance Final
- Plus, the next-best teams from the U.S. Ice Dance Final until the maximum is met

There will be a maximum of 15 spots.

== Entries ==
U.S. Figure Skating published the official list of preliminary entries on November 21, 2022.

=== Senior ===
Men	Women	Pairs	Ice dance
Will Annis	Starr Andrews	Sophia Baram / Daniel Tioumentsev	Emily Bratti / Ian Somerville
Jason Brown	Elsa Cheng	Emily Chan / Spencer Akira Howe	Oona Brown / Gage Brown
Goku Endo	Ting Cui	Nica Digerness / Mark Sadusky	Christina Carreira / Anthony Ponomarenko
Mitchell Friess	Alexa Gasparotto	Linzy Fitzpatrick / Keyton Bearinger	Madison Chock / Evan Bates
Tomoki Hiwatashi	Amber Glenn	Grace Hanns / Danny Neudecker	Caroline Depietri / TJ Carey
Liam Kapeikis	Gracie Gold	Ellie Kam / Danny O'Shea	Caroline Green / Michael Parsons
Joonsoo Kim	Hanna Harrell	Alexa Knierim / Brandon Frazier	Isabella Flores / Ivan Desyatov
Joseph Klein	Sonja Hilmer	Katie McBeath / Nathan Bartholomay	Rafaella Koncius / Alexey Shchepetov
Jimmy Ma	Gabriella Izzo	Maria Mokhova / Ivan Mokhov	Leah Krauskopf / YuanShi Jin
Ilia Malinin	Josephine Lee	Nina Ouellette / Rique Newby-Estrella	Angela Ling / Caleb Wein
Daniel Martynov	Michelle Lee	Valentina Plazas / Maximiliano Fernandez	Lorraine McNamara / Anton Spiridonov
Samuel Mindra	Isabeau Levito	—N/a	Cara Murphy / Josh Levitt
Maxim Naumov	Clare Seo	—N/a	Eva Pate / Logan Bye
Matthew Nielsen	Audrey Shin	—N/a	Katarina Wolfkostin / Jeffrey Chen
Yaroslav Paniot	Bradie Tennell	—N/a	Emilea Zingas / Vadym Kolesnik
Camden Pulkinen	Lindsay Thorngren	—N/a	—N/a
Andrew Torgashev	Lindsay Wang	—N/a	—N/a
Dinh Tran	Ava Marie Ziegler	—N/a	—N/a

=== Junior ===
Men	Women	Pairs	Ice dance
Nicholas Brooks	Sophia Baram	Margaret Church / William Church	Kristina Bland / Matthew Sperry
Lucas Broussard	Mia Barghout	Melania Delis / Jaden Schwab	Helena Carhart / Volodymyr Horovyi
Lorenzo Elano	Sofia Bezkorovainaya	Olivia Flores / Luke Wang	Julia Epps / Blake Gilman
Sergei Evseev	Melania Blecic	Ellie Korytek / Timmy Chapman	Jenna Hauer / Benjamin Starr
Aleksandr Fegan	Annika Chao	Lilianna Murray / Jordan Gillette	Olivia Ilin / Dylan Cain
Allan Fisher	Ela Cui	Catherine Rivers / Nathan Rensing	Emma L'Esperance / Mika Amdour
Kirk Haugeto	Krystal Edwards	Naomi Williams / Lachlan Lewer	Anabelle Larson / Jonathan Young
Jonathan Hildebrandt	Sarah Everhardt	—N/a	Michela Melillo / Sam Chen
Lucius Kazanecki	Olivia Flores	—N/a	Leah Neset / Artem Markelov
Alexander Liu	Lilah Gibson	—N/a	Elianna Peal / Ethan Peal
Zachary LoPinto	Hannah Herrera	—N/a	Vanessa Pham / Jonathan Rogers
Daniil Murzin	Logan Higase-Chen	—N/a	Juliette Shadid / Lucas Shadid
Nhat-Viet Nguyen	Keira Hilbelink	—N/a	—N/a
Connor O'Grady	Jessica Jurka	—N/a	—N/a
Jacob Sanchez	Katie Krafchik	—N/a	—N/a
Taira Shinohara	Soho Lee	—N/a	—N/a
Beck Strommer	Elyce Lin-Gracey	—N/a	—N/a
Vaclav Vasquez	Rinako Oya	—N/a	—N/a
Michael Xie	Phoebe Stubblefield	—N/a	—N/a
Robert Yampolsky	Sherry Zhang	—N/a	—N/a

=== Changes to preliminary entries ===
Date	Discipline	Withdrew	Added	Reason/Other notes	Refs
December 7, 2022	Senior ice dance	Molly Cesanek / Yehor Yehorov	Cara Murphy / Josh Levitt	Personal reasons	
December 15, 2022	Junior pairs	Isabelle Martins / Aaron Felberbaum			
December 15, 2022	Junior ice dance	Anna Sophia O'Brien / Steven Wei		Country switch (Azerbaijan)	
January 9, 2023	Junior pairs	Cayla Smith / Andy Deng		Split	
January 9, 2023	Junior pairs	Graceann Gottschalk / Collin Motley			
January 17, 2023	Senior ice dance	Kaitlin Hawayek / Jean-Luc Baker	Caroline Depietri / TJ Carey	Health	
January 17, 2023	Junior women	Adele Zheng	Rinako Oya		
January 17, 2023	Junior women	N/A	Sophia Baram		
January 17, 2023	Junior pairs	Kayla Black / Kamden Black			
January 22, 2023	Senior pairs	Anastasiia Smirnova / Danil Siianytsia			
January 23, 2023	Junior pairs	Audrey Park / Carter Griffin			

== Schedule ==
Date	Discipline	Time	Segment
Tuesday, 24 January	Junior pairs	11:40	Short program
Tuesday, 24 January	Junior men	13:20	Short program
Tuesday, 24 January	Junior ice dance	19:15	Rhythm dance
Wednesday, 25 January	Junior women	09:15	Short program
Wednesday, 25 January	Junior men	12:15	Free skating
Wednesday, 25 January	Junior pairs	15:45	Free skating
Wednesday, 25 January	Junior ice dance	20:40	Free dance
Thursday, 26 January	Junior women	08:30	Free skating
Thursday, 26 January	Pairs	12:30	Short program
Thursday, 26 January	Ice dance	15:30	Rhythm dance
Thursday, 26 January	Women	18:10	Short program
Friday, 27 January	Men	13:10	Short program
Friday, 27 January	Women	16:45	Free skating
Saturday, 28 January	Ice dance	10:40	Free dance
Saturday, 28 January	Pairs	16:30	Free skating
Sunday, 29 January	Men	11:45	Free skating

- All times are listed in local time (UTC-08:00).

== Medal summary ==
=== Senior ===
Discipline	Gold	Silver	Bronze	Pewter
Men	Ilia Malinin	Jason Brown	Andrew Torgashev	Maxim Naumov
Women	Isabeau Levito	Bradie Tennell	Amber Glenn	Starr Andrews
Pairs	Alexa Knierim / Brandon Frazier	Emily Chan / Spencer Akira Howe	Ellie Kam / Danny O'Shea	Sophia Baram / Daniel Tioumentsev
Ice dance	Madison Chock / Evan Bates	Caroline Green / Michael Parsons	Christina Carreira / Anthony Ponomarenko	Emilea Zingas / Vadym Kolesnik

=== Junior ===
Discipline	Gold	Silver	Bronze	Pewter
Men	Lucas Broussard	Jacob Sanchez	Robert Yampolsky	Daniil Murzin
Women	Soho Lee	Keira Hilbelink	Elyce Lin-Gracey	Sherry Zhang
Pairs	Ellie Korytek / Timmy Chapman	Naomi Williams / Lachlan Lewer	Lilianna Murray / Jordan Gillette	Olivia Flores / Luke Wang
Ice dance	Leah Neset / Artem Markelov	Helena Carhart / Volodymyr Horovyi	Jenna Hauer / Benjamin Starr	Elianna Peal / Ethan Peal

== Senior results ==
=== Senior men ===
Rank	Name	Total points	SP		FS	
1	Ilia Malinin	287.74	1	110.36	2	177.37
2	Jason Brown	277.32	2	100.25	3	177.06
3	Andrew Torgashev	255.56	5	78.78	1	177.78
4	Maxim Naumov	249.14	6	77.71	4	171.43
5	Jimmy Ma	243.09	7	73.88	5	169.21
6	Liam Kapeikis	226.85	4	82.27	10	144.58
7	Yaroslav Paniot	225.99	10	70.87	6	155.12
8	Camden Pulkinen	223.72	11	69.47	7	154.25
9	Samuel Mindra	218.74	9	71.36	9	147.38
10	Tomoki Hiwatashi	217.62	3	85.43	14	132.19
11	Daniel Martynov	213.67	14	64.04	8	148.63
12	Matthew Nielsen	202.38	12	67.98	12	134.40
13	Joseph Klein	194.87	18	58.39	11	136.49
14	Joonsoo Kim	193.78	13	67.45	15	126.33
15	Will Annis	188.13	15	63.46	16	124.67
16	Dinh Tran	187.18	16	60.63	13	126.55
17	Goku Endo	171.50	8	73.45	17	98.05
18	Mitchell Friess	151.31	17	59.14	18	92.17

=== Senior women ===
Rank	Name	Total points	SP		FS	
1	Isabeau Levito	223.33	1	73.78	1	149.55
2	Bradie Tennell	213.12	2	73.76	2	139.36
3	Amber Glenn	207.44	4	68.96	3	138.48
4	Starr Andrews	188.24	3	68.97	7	119.27
5	Josephine Lee	187.68	11	55.60	4	132.08
6	Lindsay Thorngren	187.19	6	62.64	5	124.55
7	Clare Seo	175.60	7	61.48	9	114.12
8	Gracie Gold	173.98	5	67.44	11	106.54
9	Ava Marie Ziegler	167.70	8	61.09	10	106.61
10	Sonja Hilmer	166.49	13	51.16	8	115.33
11	Gabriella Izzo	166.40	15	45.73	6	120.67
12	Ting Cui	161.27	10	57.11	12	104.16
13	Audrey Shin	161.12	9	60.76	14	100.36
14	Lindsay Wang	154.91	12	52.19	13	102.72
15	Michelle Lee	145.28	14	46.71	15	98.57
16	Elsa Cheng	138.13	17	44.36	16	93.77
17	Alexa Gasparotto	129.41	16	45.00	17	84.41
WD	Hanna Harrell	withdrew	18	42.84	withdrew from competition	

=== Senior pairs ===
Rank	Name	Total points	SP		FS	
1	Alexa Knierim / Brandon Frazier	227.97	1	81.96	1	146.01
2	Emily Chan / Spencer Akira Howe	196.86	2	66.86	2	130.00
3	Ellie Kam / Danny O'Shea	184.01	3	65.75	3	118.26
4	Sophia Baram / Daniel Tioumentsev	179.08	5	63.12	4	115.96
5	Valentina Plazas / Maximiliano Fernandez	176.34	4	63.45	6	112.89
6	Katie McBeath / Nathan Bartholomay	172.74	6	59.96	5	115.78
7	Maria Mokhova / Ivan Mokhov	148.84	8	49.46	7	99.38
8	Nica Digerness / Mark Sadusky	137.98	7	50.72	10	87.26
9	Grace Hanns / Danny Neudecker	135.30	9	46.81	8	88.49
10	Nina Ouellette / Rique Newby-Estrella	132.07	11	43.99	9	88.08
11	Linzy Fitzpatrick / Keyton Bearinger	129.80	10	45.27	11	84.53

=== Senior ice dance ===
Rank	Name	Total points	SD		FD	
1	Madison Chock / Evan Bates	229.75	1	91.90	1	137.85
2	Caroline Green / Michael Parsons	207.46	2	81.40	2	126.06
3	Christina Carreira / Anthony Ponomarenko	198.45	4	77.37	3	121.08
4	Emilea Zingas / Vadym Kolesnik	198.13	3	78.18	4	119.95
5	Emily Bratti / Ian Somerville	189.84	6	75.91	6	113.93
6	Lorraine McNamara / Anton Spiridonov	189.15	5	76.23	7	112.92
7	Katarina Wolfkostin / Jeffrey Chen	183.05	10	69.05	5	114.00
8	Eva Pate / Logan Bye	182.61	7	75.52	9	107.09
9	Oona Brown / Gage Brown	181.89	9	72.80	8	109.09
10	Isabella Flores / Ivan Desyatov	177.31	8	73.91	10	103.40
11	Angela Ling / Caleb Wein	167.87	11	68.53	11	99.34
12	Leah Krauskopf / YuanShi Jin	133.93	12	52.59	12	81.34
13	Cara Murphy / Josh Levitt	129.85	13	50.88	13	78.97
14	Caroline Depietri / TJ Carey	123.40	14	48.28	14	75.12
WD	Rafaella Koncius / Alexey Shchepetov	withdrew from competition				

== Junior results ==
=== Junior men ===
Rank	Name	Total points	SP		FS	
1	Lucas Broussard	239.55	1	82.03	1	157.52
2	Jacob Sanchez	213.57	4	69.85	2	143.72
3	Robert Yampolsky	212.41	2	78.60	3	133.81
4	Daniil Murzin	196.20	3	72.94	5	123.26
5	Michael Xie	196.17	6	64.93	4	131.24
6	Beck Strommer	182.33	8	59.94	6	122.39
7	Kirk Haugeto	181.35	9	59.64	7	121.71
8	Taira Shinohara	177.29	5	68.54	8	108.75
9	Jonathan Hildebrandt	163.50	7	61.72	11	101.78
10	Aleksandr Fegan	162.03	12	55.61	9	106.42
11	Zachary LoPinto	153.79	15	50.72	10	103.07
12	Nicholas Brooks	152.51	14	50.77	12	101.74
13	Alexander Liu	148.08	11	55.76	15	92.32
14	Lucius Kazanecki	146.77	10	55.95	16	90.82
15	Vaclav Vasquez	145.56	13	51.98	13	93.58
16	Nhat-Viet Nguyen	141.75	17	48.35	14	93.40
17	Lorenzo Elano	126.19	18	43.75	17	82.44
18	Allan Fisher	121.51	16	48.48	18	73.03
19	Connor O'Grady	107.25	19	35.49	19	71.76
20	Sergei Evseev	97.64	20	31.95	20	65.69

=== Junior women ===
Rank	Name	Total points	SP		FS	
1	Soho Lee	181.14	1	66.34	1	114.80
2	Keira Hilbelink	167.99	5	55.05	2	112.94
3	Elyce Lin-Gracey	165.57	2	65.57	7	100.00
4	Sherry Zhang	161.08	3	61.38	9	99.70
5	Katie Krafchik	160.52	6	53.52	3	107.00
6	Hannah Herrera	158.58	4	57.99	6	100.59
7	Jessica Jurka	151.99	12	49.08	4	102.91
8	Sophia Baram	151.29	7	53.38	11	97.91
9	Annika Chao	150.65	9	50.68	8	99.97
10	Logan Higase-Chen	149.72	8	51.06	10	98.66
11	Ela Cui	148.39	13	47.14	5	101.25
12	Mia Barghout	142.19	10	49.27	12	92.92
13	Sarah Everhardt	137.08	11	49.26	13	87.82
14	Sofia Bezkorovainaya	130.10	14	45.63	14	84.47
15	Krystal Edwards	124.58	16	40.99	15	83.59
16	Lilah Gibson	113.72	15	44.22	18	69.50
17	Olivia Flores	108.17	20	35.90	16	72.27
18	Melania Blecic	107.07	19	36.26	17	70.81
19	Rinako Oya	95.71	17	39.17	19	56.54
WD	Phoebe Stubblefield	withdrew	18	38.52	withdrew from competition	

=== Junior pairs ===
Rank	Name	Total points	SP		FS	
1	Ellie Korytek / Timmy Chapman	160.40	1	57.69	1	102.71
2	Naomi Williams / Lachlan Lewer	148.83	2	56.79	2	92.04
3	Lilianna Murray / Jordan Gillette	123.22	3	47.85	4	75.37
4	Olivia Flores / Luke Wang	123.09	4	46.31	3	76.78
5	Melania Delis / Jaden Schwab	108.10	5	34.81	5	73.29
6	Catherine Rivers / Nathan Rensing	95.40	6	33.50	6	61.90
7	Margaret Church / William Church	75.55	7	27.21	7	48.34

=== Junior ice dance ===
Rank	Name	Total points	SD		FD	
1	Leah Neset / Artem Markelov	161.75	7	56.19	1	105.56
2	Helena Carhart / Volodymyr Horovyi	160.81	1	68.53	2	92.28
3	Jenna Hauer / Benjamin Starr	157.73	2	65.47	3	92.26
4	Elianna Peal / Ethan Peal	152.31	3	61.91	5	90.40
5	Vanessa Pham / Jonathan Rogers	149.54	4	58.22	4	91.32
6	Kristina Bland / Matthew Sperry	132.04	6	57.53	6	74.51
7	Olivia Ilin / Dylan Cain	130.51	5	57.57	7	72.94
8	Julia Epps / Blake Gilman	122.82	8	53.50	8	69.32
9	Anabelle Larson / Jonathan Young	110.52	9	45.50	9	65.02
10	Juliette Shadid / Lucas Shadid	107.38	10	43.58	10	63.80
11	Emma L'Esperance / Mika Amdour	106.42	11	42.99	12	63.43
12	Michela Melillo / Sam Chen	100.22	12	36.57	11	63.65

== International team selections ==
=== Four Continents Championships ===
The 2023 Four Continents Championships were held from February 7–12, 2023 in Colorado Springs, Colorado in the United States. Teams were selected using the Athlete Selection criteria.

	Men	Women	Pairs	Ice dance
1	Liam Kapeikis	Amber Glenn	Emily Chan / Spencer Akira Howe	Christina Carreira / Anthony Ponomarenko
2	Jimmy Ma	Isabeau Levito	Ellie Kam / Danny O'Shea	Madison Chock / Evan Bates
3	Maxim Naumov	Bradie Tennell	Valentina Plazas / Maximiliano Fernandez	Caroline Green / Michael Parsons
1st alt.	Tomoki Hiwatashi	Starr Andrews	Katie McBeath / Nathan Bartholomay	Emilea Zingas / Vadym Kolesnik
2nd alt.	Yaroslav Paniot	Lindsay Thorngren	Maria Mokhova / Ivan Mokhov	Emily Bratti / Ian Somerville
3rd alt.	Samuel Mindra	Gracie Gold		Eva Pate / Logan Bye

=== World Junior Championships ===
Commonly referred to as "Junior Worlds", the 2023 World Junior Championships were held from February 27 – March 5, 2023, in Calgary, Canada. Teams were selected using the Athlete Selection Criteria.

	Men	Women	Pairs	Ice dance
1	Lucas Broussard	Josephine Lee	Sophia Baram / Daniel Tioumentsev	Helena Carhart / Volodymyr Horovyi
2	Daniel Martynov	Soho Lee	Naomi Williams / Lachlan Lewer	Jenna Hauer / Benjamin Starr
3	~~Robert Yampolsky~~ (withdrew)	Clare Seo		Leah Neset / Artem Markelov
1st alt.	Michael Xie (called up)	Ava Marie Ziegler	Lilianna Murray / Jordan Gillette	Vanessa Pham / Jonathan Rogers
2nd alt.	Jacob Sanchez	Mia Kalin		Elianna Peal / Ethan Peal
3rd alt.	Joseph Klein	Elyce Lin-Gracey		Kristina Bland / Matthew Sperry

=== World Championships ===
The 2023 World Championships were held from March 20–26 in Saitama, Japan. Teams were selected using the Athlete Selection criteria.

	Men	Women	Pairs	Ice dance
1	Jason Brown	Amber Glenn	Emily Chan / Spencer Akira Howe	Madison Chock / Evan Bates
2	Ilia Malinin	Isabeau Levito	Ellie Kam / Danny O'Shea	Caroline Green / Michael Parsons
3	Andrew Torgashev	Bradie Tennell	Alexa Knierim / Brandon Frazier	~~Kaitlin Hawayek / Jean-Luc Baker~~ (withdrew)
1st alt.	Camden Pulkinen	Starr Andrews	Anastasiia Smirnova / Danil Siianytsia	Christina Carreira / Anthony Ponomarenko (called up)
2nd alt.	Maxim Naumov	Lindsay Thorngren	Valentina Plazas / Maximiliano Fernandez	Emilea Zingas / Vadym Kolesnik
3rd alt.	Jimmy Ma	Ava Marie Ziegler	Katie McBeath / Nathan Bartholomay	Emily Bratti / Ian Somerville
