= Todd Sand =

American pair skater (born 1963)

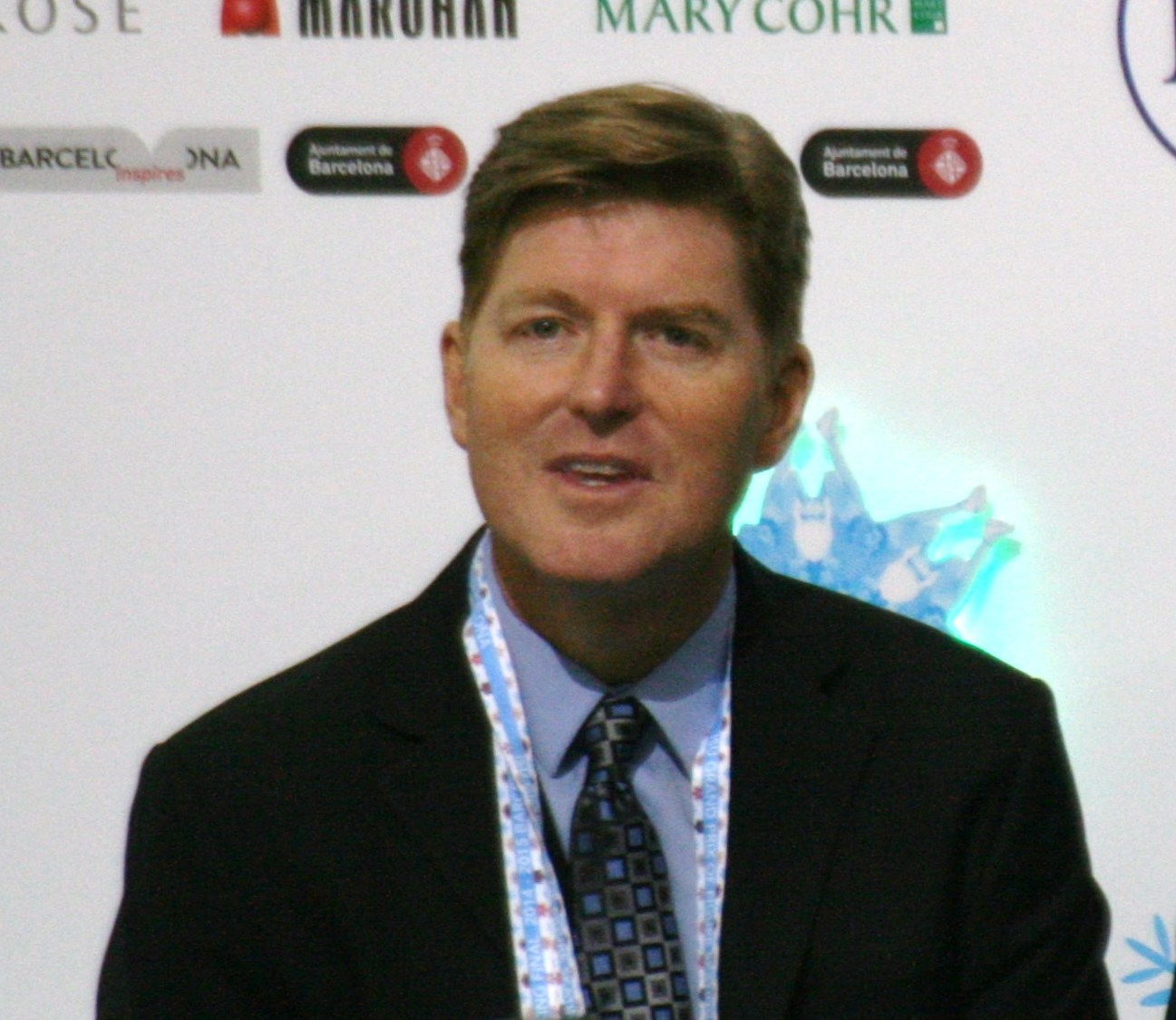
- Sand in 2014

Personal information
- Born: October 30, 1963 (age 63)
- Height: 5 ft 10.5 in (179 cm)

Figure skating career
- Country: United States; Denmark (1981–83)
- Partner: Jenni Meno (1992–98); Natasha Kuchiki (1989–1992); Lori Blasko (1985–88)
- Coach: John Nicks
- Retired: 1998
Medal record
Representing the United States
Pairs' Figure skating
World Championships
Silver medal – second place	1998 Minneapolis	Pairs
Bronze medal – third place	1996 Edmonton	Pairs
Bronze medal – third place	1995 Birmingham	Pairs
Bronze medal – third place	1991 Munich	Pairs

Todd Sand (born October 30, 1963) is an American pair skater. With his wife Jenni Meno, he is the 1998 World silver medalist, a two-time World bronze medalist (1995, 1996), and a three-time U.S. national champion (1994–96). With his previous partner Natasha Kuchiki, he is the 1991 World bronze medalist.

== Personal life ==
Sand was born in Burbank, California. He has dual American and Danish citizenship, since his father is Danish. He is married to Jenni Meno, with whom he has two sons, Jack, born in 2004, and Matthew Kenneth, born in 2006.

In March 2023, while attending the 2023 World Junior Figure Skating Championships with his students, Sophia Baram / Daniel Tioumentsev in Calgary, Alberta, Sand suffered a heart attack and was hospitalized for an extended period.

== Skating career ==
=== Early career ===
Early in his career, Sand represented Denmark as a single skater. He competed for that country at the World and European Championships in the early 1980s.

In 1985, Sand began competing as a pair skater with Lori Blasko, representing the United States. They were the 1985 U.S. national bronze medalists on the junior level.

=== Career with Kuchiki ===
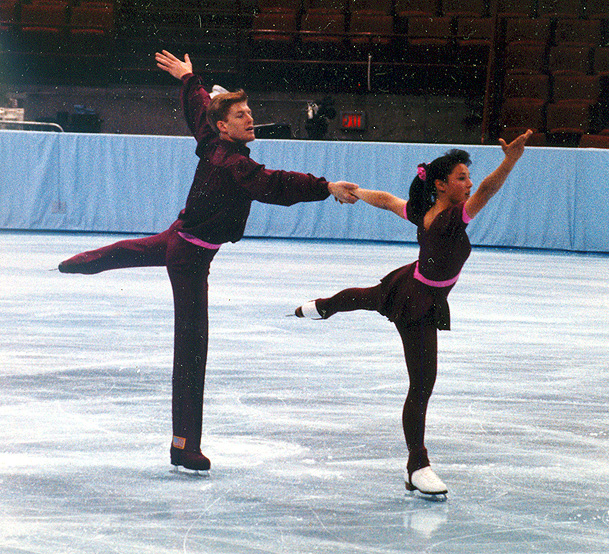
Sand and Natasha Kuchiki in the 1990s

Sand teamed up with Natasha Kuchiki in spring 1989. They won three senior pairs medals at the U.S. Championships, including gold in 1991, and competed at three World Championships, winning a surprising bronze in 1991. They also competed at the 1992 Winter Olympics, where they placed 6th. Kuchiki and Sand announced the end of their partnership in April 1992.

=== Career with Meno ===
Meno and Sand teamed up on the ice in April 1992. They had immediate success, qualifying for the 1993 World Figure Skating Championships in their first season with a 2nd-place finish at the U.S Nationals, and were the top Americans there placing 5th, qualifying three teams for the 1994 Winter Olympics in Lillehammer, Norway. They became U.S Champions in 1994, then placed 5th in arguably the strongest pairs field assembled in history in Lillehammer with two clean skates.

In 1995, they won their second consecutive U.S title with perhaps their finest performance ever, gaining 6 perfect 6.0s for artistic impression. They then came from 5th after the short program to win the bronze medal at the 1995 World Figure Skating Championships. In 1996, they won their third consecutive U.S title, and again climbed from 5th to 3rd, and won their second consecutive World bronze medal.

In 1997, they set themselves up as possible contenders for the World title early in the season, beating both the World gold and World silver medallists Marina Eltsova / Andrei Bushkov and Mandy Woetzel / Ingo Steuer in fall competitions. They had also gained the necessary side by side triple toes that had prevented them from a higher finish than 3rd place at the previous two World Championships. They however lost their form and suffered a last place finish at the Champions Series final in Hamilton, Ontario, and lost their U.S title to Kyoko Ina / Jason Dungjen. With a chance for the World title after major mistakes by the other top teams, they suffered another lacklustre outing and dropped to 5th at the 1997 World Figure Skating Championships.

They missed much of the 1997–1998 competitive season with injury, and had to withdraw from the U.S Championships after the short program, but on their past record were named to the team for the 1998 Winter Olympics in Nagano, Japan. After a dismal performance in Nagano in finishing 8th, they ended their career on a high on home ice in Minneapolis at the 1998 World Figure Skating Championships, winning the short program, and taking the silver medal, their highest finish ever at Worlds. Following their retirement from competitive skating, they skated professionally in the Stars on Ice tour for six seasons.

== Post-skating career ==
Sand appeared in the ITV series Dancing on Ice with double Olympic gold medallist Kelly Holmes. They were eliminated in quarterfinal (Week 6) after the judges' votes to save Bonnie Langford and her partner Matt Evers.

Sand works as a coach with his wife. They previously coached John Baldwin / Rena Inoue, Mary Beth Marley / Rockne Brubaker, and Jessica Calalang / Zack Sidhu. Currently, they coach Alexa Knierim / Brandon Frazier.

Sand is an ISU Technical Specialist. He was a technical specialist for the men's event at the 2005 World Championships.

== Competitive highlights ==
=== Pairs career for the United States ===
==== With Jenni Meno ====
International
Event	1992–93	1993–94	1994–95	1995–96	1996–97	1997–98
Olympics		5th				8th
Worlds	5th	6th	3rd	3rd	5th	2nd
CS Final				4th	WD	
CS Lalique		3rd		3rd	2nd	
CS NHK Trophy			5th		1st	2nd
CS Skate America				2nd		
Prague Skate	1st					
National
U.S. Champ.	2nd	1st	1st	1st	2nd	WD
CS = Champions Series from 1995–1996 (later renamed Grand Prix); WD = Withdrew

==== With Natasha Kuchiki ====
International
Event	1989–1990	1990–1991	1991–1992
Olympics			6th
World Championships	11th	3rd	8th
Skate America		4th	6th
NHK Trophy		5th	
Skate Canada	5th		
National
U.S. Championships	2nd	1st	3rd

==== With Lori Blasko ====
International
Event	1984-1985	1985–1986	1986–1987	1987–1988
Skate America			6th	
Prague Skate		1st		
National
U.S. Championships	3rd J	7th		8th

=== Singles career for Denmark ===
International
Event	1981	1982	1983
World Championships	19th	22nd	
European Championships		19th	19th
Nordic Championships	2nd	2nd	
National
Danish Championships		1st	1st
