= Hektor Giotopoulos Moore =

Australian pair skater (born 2002)

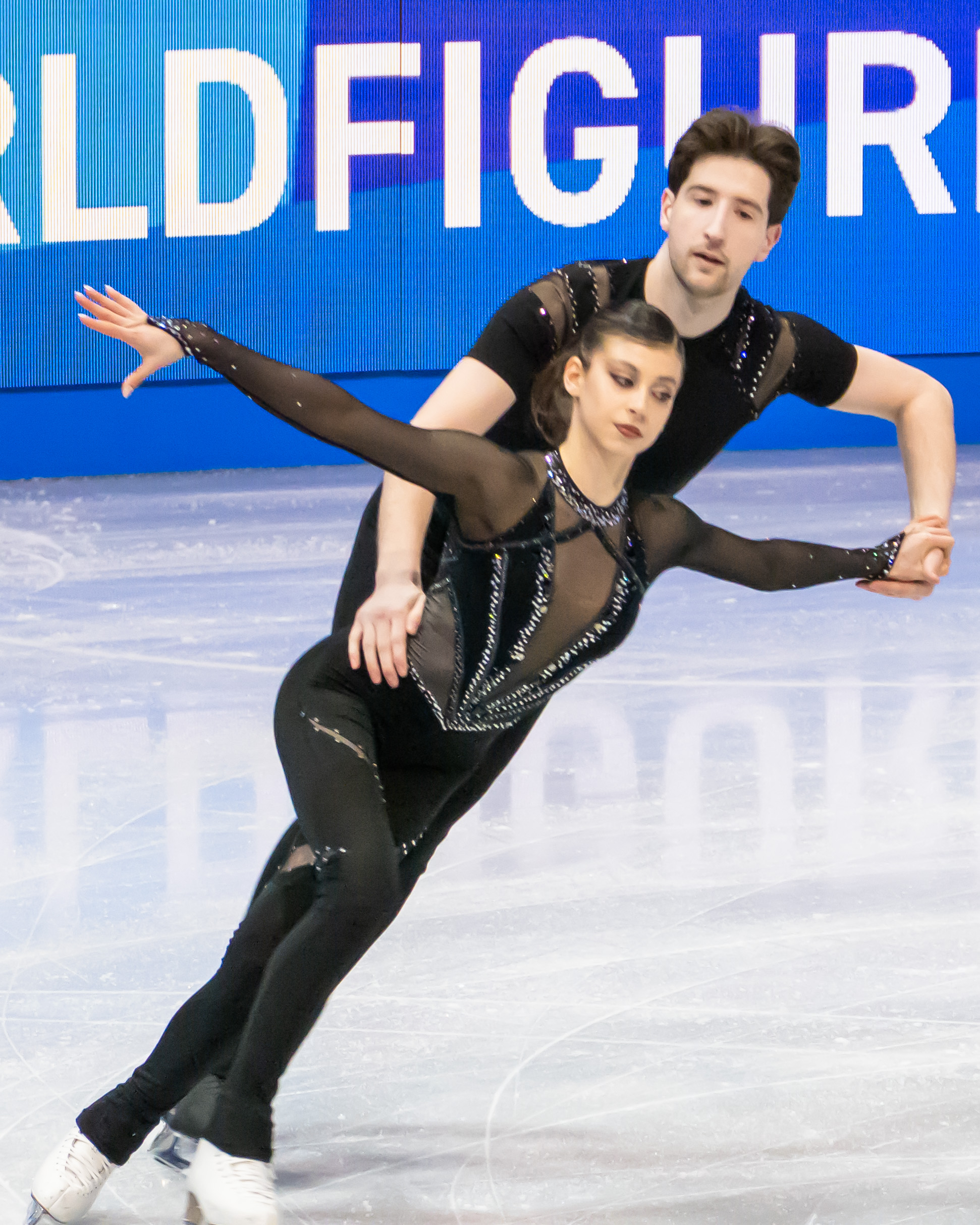
- Anastasiia Golubeva and Hektor Giatopoulos Moore performing their short program at the 2025 World Championships

Personal information
- Born: 25 June 2002 (age 24) Melbourne, Australia
- Home town: Sydney, Australia
- Height: 1.84 m (6 ft 0 in)

Figure skating career
- Country: Australia
- Partner: Anastasiia Golubeva (2019–26)
- Coach: Galina Pachina; Andrei Pachin
- Skating club: Sydney Figure Skating Club

Medal record
Australian Championships
Gold medal – first place	2023 Erina	Pairs
World Junior Championships
Silver medal – second place	2022 Tallinn	Pairs
Silver medal – second place	2023 Calgary	Pairs
Junior Grand Prix Final
Gold medal – first place	2022–23 Turin	Pairs

Hektor Giotopoulos Moore (born 25 June 2002) is an Australian pair skater. With his skating partner, Anastasiia Golubeva, he is the 2024 Skate Canada bronze medalist, 2022 CS Warsaw Cup champion, and the 2023 Australian National champion. The pair represented Australia at the 2026 Winter Olympics.

On the junior level, Golubeva and Giotopoulos Moore are two-time World Junior silver medalists (2022 and 2023) and the 2022–23 Junior Grand Prix Final champions.

== Personal life ==
Hektor Giotopoulos Moore was born on June 25, 2002, in Melbourne, Australia to parents, Xanthippe and Marcus. His mother is of Greek descent and his father, an engineer, has UK & Austrian heritage. Giotopoulos Moore also has three siblings: Kassandra, the eldest; Davis, the second-born; and Alek, the youngest.

Moreover, Giotopoulos Moore holds dual Australian-Greek citizenship. While living and training in Moscow with Golubeva during the COVID-19 pandemic, he learned how to speak Russian and is now fluent in the language.

== Career ==
=== Early Career ===
Giotopoulos Moore began skating at the age of nine after developing an interest in pair skating from watching a pair team, coached by Galina Pachina and Andrei Pachin, performing a lift in practice at the Sydney Figure Skating Club. The Pachins agreed to train him after seeing how tall Giotopoulos Moore's father was and knowing that Giotopoulos Moore would likely grow to be tall enough to be a pair skater as well. In addition, he won the 2017 Australian Novice Championships as a singles skater.

Due to the difficulties of finding a suitable pair partner in Australia, Giotopoulos Moore and his coaches searched for potential partners abroad. He initially skated with Karina Akopova of Russia and Milania Väänänen of Finland but neither partnerships lasted. In the fall of 2019, Giotopoulos Moore had a try-out with Anastasiia Golubeva, a singles skater from Moscow, after Galina Pachina and Andrei Pachin were able to get in contact with Golubeva's coach in Russia. Golubeva/Giotopoulos Moore decided to team up following a successful try-out.

In February 2020, the COVID-19 pandemic hit while Giotopoulos Moore was training with Golubeva in Moscow, and Golubeva had yet to obtain a visa to relocate to Australia. Due to lockdowns, Golubeva/Giotopoulos Moore were unable to use Russian ice rinks to train so instead, they would meet every day in a closed restaurant to practice off-ice training. When Giatopoulos Moore's visa began to expire, the pair temporarily relocated to Belarus due to the country allowing three-month visa-free entry.

The team would finally relocate to Sydney, Australia after the country re-opened its borders.

=== Partnership with Anastasia Golubeva ===
==== 2021–22 season: Debut of Golubeva/Giotopoulos Moore, World Junior Championships silver ====
Golubeva/Giotopoulos Moore debuted as a pair team on the 2021–22 ISU Junior Grand Prix and finished fifth at both their ISU Junior Grand Prix events in Russia and Austria. The pair would also go on to compete at the senior level the 2021–22 Challenger Series, placing eighth at the 2021 Nebelhorn Trophy and tenth at the 2021 Golden Spin of Zagreb. At the 2022 Winter Star in Minsk, Belarus, Golubeva/Giotopoulos Moore would win the gold medal.

Although the pair were assigned to compete at the 2022 World Championships in Montpellier, their plans were disrupted by the Russian invasion of Ukraine. Due to Golubeva's Russian citizenship, they were unable to have a visa processed in time to travel to France, and withdrew from the event.

As a further result of the invasion, the International Skating Union banned all Russian and Belarusian skaters from participating in international competitions, which had a significant impact on the international pairs field. Golubeva/Giotopoulos Moore were assigned as well to the 2022 World Junior Championships, initially scheduled to be held in Sofia in March. However, due to both the invasion and COVID pandemic issues, Bulgaria renounced hosting the event, which was rescheduled for Tallinn in April. Golubeva/Giotopoulos Moore placed second in the short program. They were second in the free skate as well, despite some minor errors, winning the silver medal. Golubeva said afterward that "this is my first medal. We have some little mistakes in the program, but overall we're very happy." They became the third Australian pair team to win a World Junior medal, after Cain/Cain in 1976 and Alexandrovskaya/Windsor in 2017.

==== 2022–23 season: World Junior Championships silver, Junior Grand Prix Final champion ====
Although Golubeva/Giotopoulos Moore were selected to compete on the Grand Prix circuit at 2022 Skate America and 2022 Grand Prix of Espoo, the pair elected to compete on the 2022–23 Junior Grand Prix instead. They were assigned to both Polish JGP events in Gdańsk, arriving at the first as the favourites to win, which they did by a wide margin. The gold medal was their first JGP medal. The following weekend they won their second event as well, despite a number of errors that caused Giotopoulos Moore to say it "wasn't as good as last week." Their results qualified them for the 2022–23 Junior Grand Prix Final in Turin, Italy.

Following the Junior Grand Prix, the pair also competed at the 2022 Warsaw Cup, which they won. At the JGP Final, Golubeva/Giotopoulos Moore placed second in the short program after Golubeva struggled to cleanly land the throw triple toe-loop, but the pair would go on to deliver a strong free skate and take the gold medal. After their free skate comeback, Golubeva said that they "tried to give all the strength we had to put into this program." Theirs was the second Junior Grand Prix Final title for an Australian pair, after Alexandrovskaya/Windsor.

Although assigned to compete at the 2023 Four Continents Championships, Golubeva/Giotopoulos Moore withdrew from the event due to Golubeva being unable to obtain an American visa to compete in Colorado Springs, Colorado. At the 2023 World Junior Championships in Calgary, Alberta, they placed second in the short program after unexpectedly missing their death spiral. The pair were able to deliver a solid free skate, however, and win the silver medal behind Americans Baram/Tioumentsev. Giotopoulos Moore called it "a huge achievement for us and we are very happy."

Making their World Championship debut at the 2023 World Championships in Saitama, Japan, the pair placed eleventh in the short program after Golubeva fell on a throw triple loop attempt but the pair would go on to deliver an almost-perfect free skate, earning a new personal best and placing fifth in that segment of the competition, moving up to eighth-place overall. Golubeva said that they had achieved their goal of a top ten placement, adding they were "so happy and thrilled" with how they had skated.

Following the season, Golubeva/Giotopoulos Moore and their coach, Galina Pachina, relocated to Montreal, Quebec, Canada, due to the suboptimal training conditions in Sydney. The pair began training at the École de Patinage Artistique Julie Marcotte Ste-Julie, the same training rink as Canadian pair team, Deanna Stellato-Dudek/Maxime Deschamps.

==== 2023–24 season: Australian national title, Grand Prix debut ====
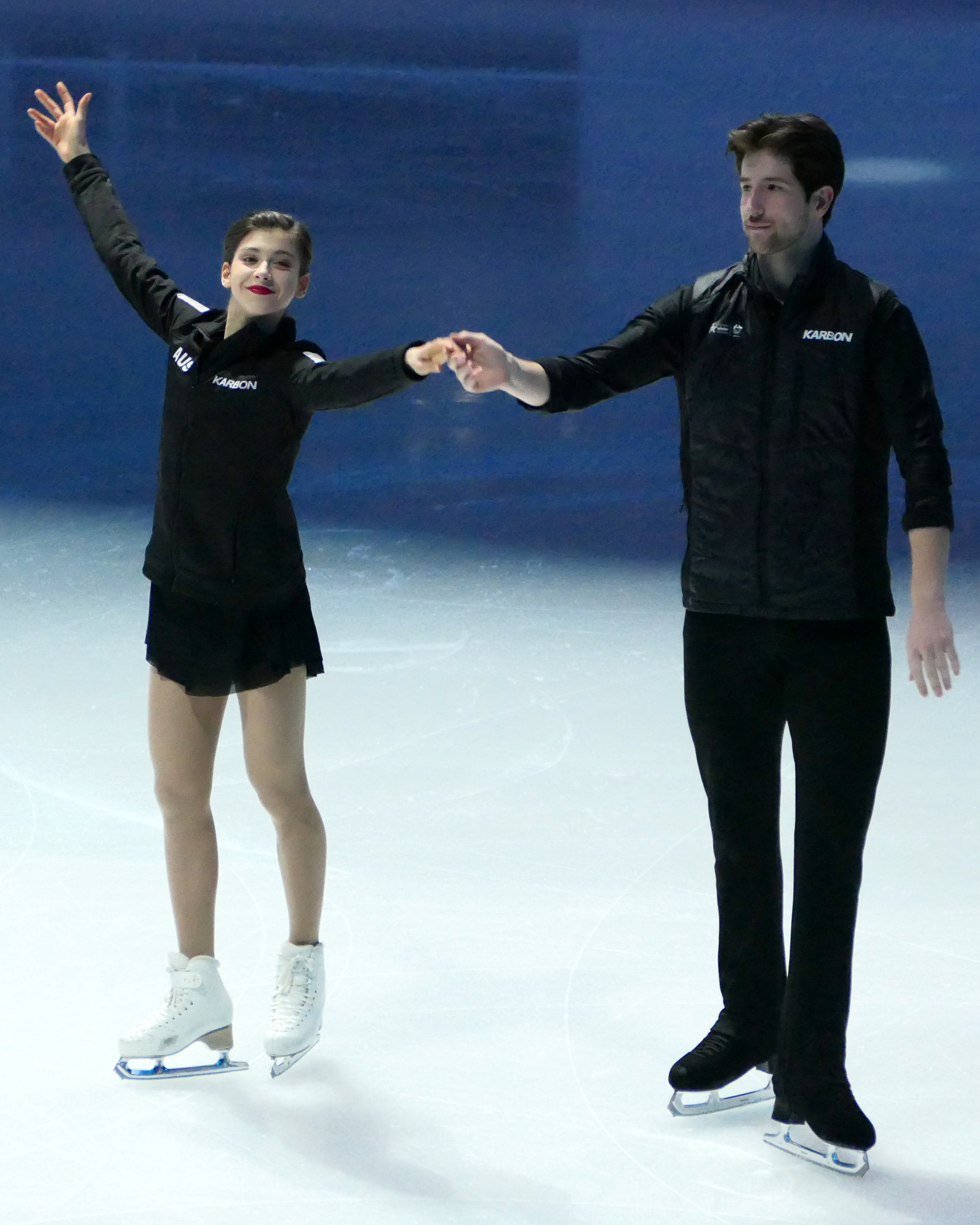
Golubeva and Giotopoulos Moore before their short program at the 2024 World Championships

With Giotopoulos Moore aging out of junior eligibility, the team planned for its first full senior season, primarily training in Australia for Golubeva's residency purposes, but also spending time in Montreal due to the coach's belief they needed to train with other high-level pair skaters, and Russia being difficult to train in at the time. They were invited to participate in the Shanghai Trophy, finishing fourth.

Golubeva/Giotopoulos Moore made their senior Grand Prix debut at the 2023 Skate Canada International. They placed third in both segments of the competition, but finished fourth overall, less than two points behind bronze medalists Beccari/Guarise of Italy. Despite several errors in their free skate, they considered it an improvement on their earlier performances, with Golubeva saying "we are looking forward to growing this program." At the 2023 NHK Trophy they finished third in the short program, but dropped to fourth place after the free skate. They said they considered their first Grand Prix season a valuable experience given its much greater professionalism in comparison to the Junior Grand Prix.

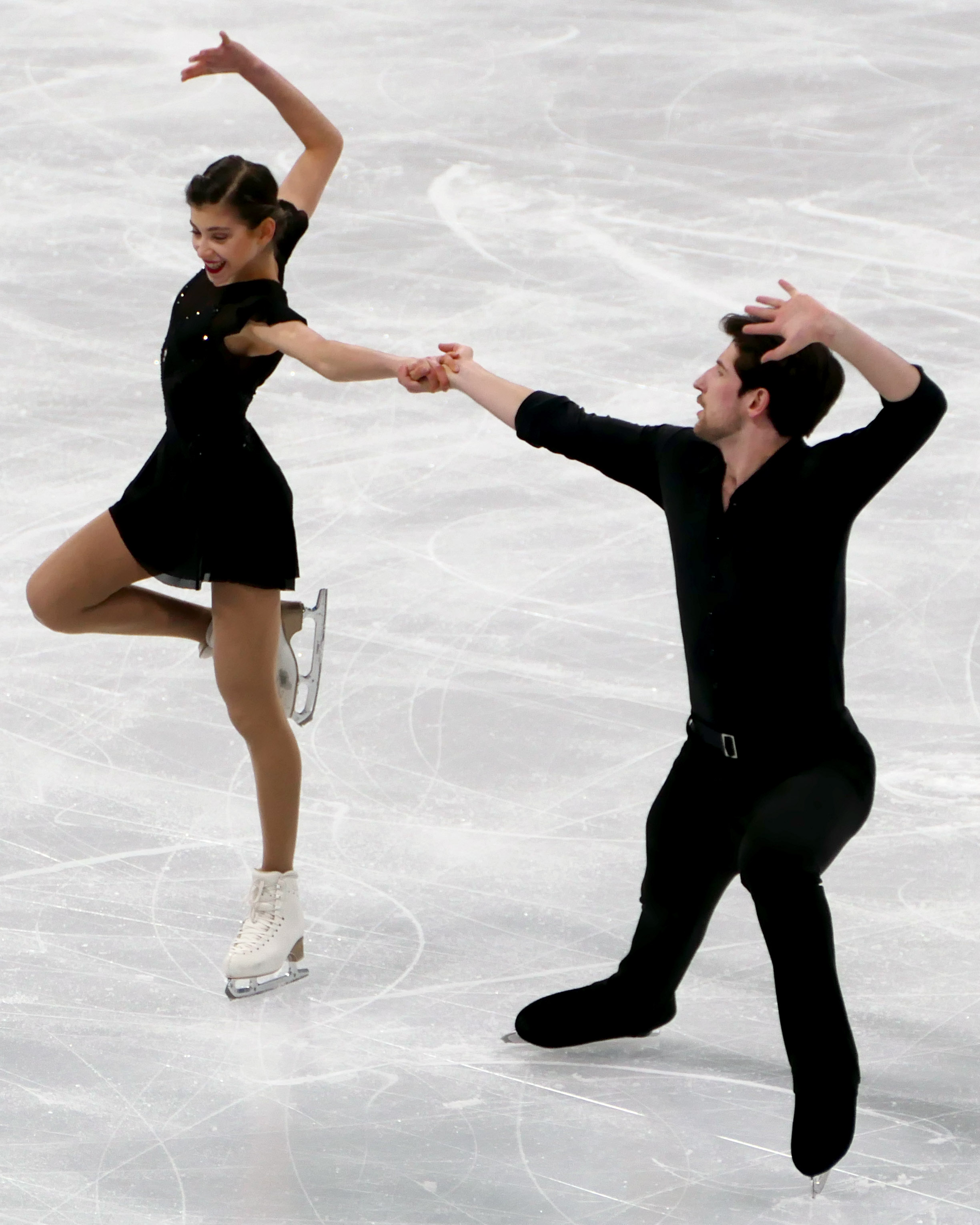
Golubeva and Giotopoulos Moore during their short program at the 2024 World Championships

For the first time in their partnership, the team was able to compete at a domestic championships, winning the Australian national title. At the 2024 Four Continents Championships in Shanghai, Golubeva/Giotopoulos Moore were seventh in the short program after she fell on a jump. They rallied in the free skate, coming fourth in that segment and moving up to fourth overall. The two said that they were pleased at their ability to recover from a disappointing short program. The team went on to compete at the 2024 World Championships in Montreal, where they came in tenth.

==== 2024–25 season: Grand Prix bronze ====
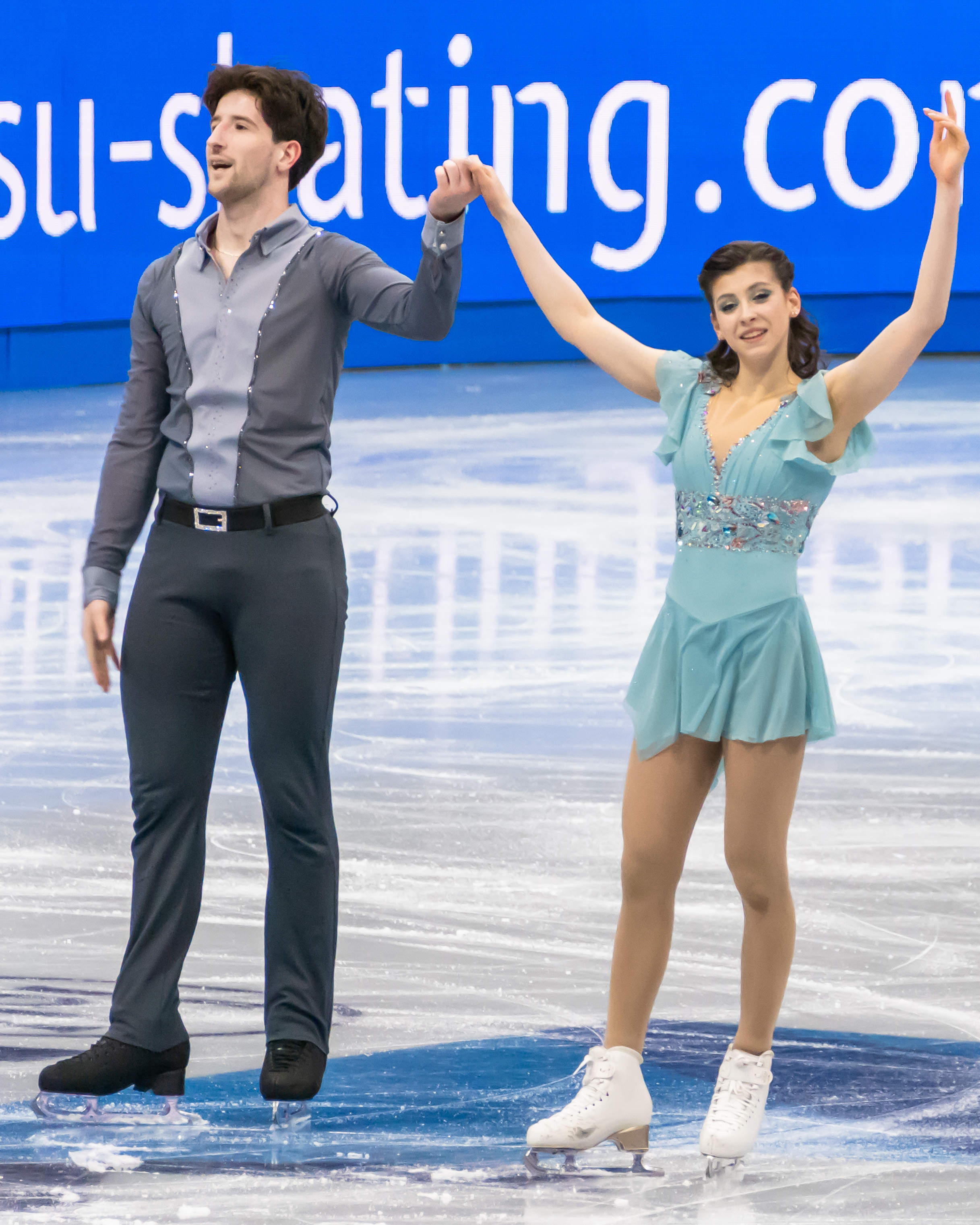
Golubeva and Giotopoulos Moore after their free skate at 2025 World Championships

In early fall, Giotopoulos Moore struggled with back problems, thus the team did not get to compete until late October. Beginning the season by competing on the 2024–25 Grand Prix series, at their first event, 2024 Skate Canada International, the pair won the bronze medal, making history as the first skaters from Australia in any discipline to win a senior Grand Prix medal. Although the pair were also assigned to compete at the 2024 Finlandia Trophy, however, they were forced to withdraw due to Golubeva falling ill with COVID-19.

In February, the pair competed at the 2025 Four Continents Championships in Seoul, South Korea, where they placed sixth in the short program and seventh in the free skate, finishing sixth overall. The following month, Golubeva/Giatopoulos Moore competed at the 2025 World Championships in Boston, Massachusetts, United States. They scored a new personal best in the short program, placing eighth in that segment and placing ninth in the free skate, finishing in ninth place overall. With this placement, Golubeva/Giatopoulos Moore won Australia a quota for pair skating at the 2026 Winter Olympics.

==== 2025–2026 season: Injury struggles, Milano Cortina Olympics ====
Although Golubeva/Giatopoulos Moore were assigned to compete at the 2025 Grand Prix de France and 2025 Skate Canada International, they opted to withdraw from both events to allow Golubeva to focus on meeting the residency requirements to obtaining Australian citizenship. During this period, the pair also had to deal with injuries, including Golubeva sustaining a concussion during training.

They returned to competition at the 2025 CS Golden Spin of Zagreb in December but withdrew following the short program. The following month, they competed at the 2026 Four Continents Championships in Beijing, China, where they finished eleventh of the eleven competitors.

== Programs ==
=== Pair skating with Anastasia Golubeva ===
Season	Short program	Free skating	Exhibition
2025–2026	Exogenesis: Symphony Part 3: Redemption by Muse choreo. by Igor Tchiniaev	Penny Dreadful; Abomination; Demimonde (Main Title); Verbis Diablo; Closer Than Sisters by Abel Korzeniowski choreo. by Julie Marcotte	
2024–2025	Exogenesis: Symphony Part 3: Redemption; Won't Stand Down by Muse choreo. by Igor Tchiniaev	The Umbrellas of Cherbourg by Michel Legrand; Final performed by José Bartel & Danielle Licari; The Umbrellas of Cherbourg performed by John Williams, Itzhak Perlman, & Pittsburgh Symphony Orchestra; La gare (Guy s'en va) performed by José Bartel & Danielle Licari; Générique by Michel Legrand choreo. by Jonathan Guerreiro	
2023–2024	Architect of the Mind by Kerry Muzzey choreo. by Jonathan Guerreiro	The Umbrellas of Cherbourg by Michel Legrand; Final performed by José Bartel & Danielle Licari; The Umbrellas of Cherbourg performed by John Williams, Itzhak Perlman, & Pittsburgh Symphony Orchestra; La gare (Guy s'en va) performed by José Bartel & Danielle Licari; Générique by Michel Legrand choreo. by Jonathan Guerreiro	Another Love by Tom Odell
2022–2023	Architect of the Mind by Kerry Muzzey choreo. by Jonathan Guerreiro	Sing, Sing, Sing by Louis Prima; Summertime performed by Ella Fitzgerald; Mr. Pinstripe Suit by Big Bad Voodoo Daddy choreo. by Galina Pachina	Another Love by Tom Odell
2021–2022	Fire Dance by Jennifer Thomas choreo. by Galina Pachina	Sing, Sing, Sing by Louis Prima; Summertime performed by Ella Fitzgerald; Mr. Pinstripe Suit by Big Bad Voodoo Daddy choreo. by Galina Pachina	

== Competitive highlights ==
=== Pair skating with Anastasia Golubeva ===
- GP – Event of the ISU Grand Prix Series
- JGP – Event of the ISU Junior Grand Prix Series
- CS – Event of the ISU Challenger Series
- TBD – Assigned
- WD – Withdrew from competition

Competition placements at senior level
Season	2021–22	2022–23	2023–24	2024–25	2025–26
Winter Olympics					18th
World Championships		8th	10th	9th	WD
Four Continents Championships			4th	6th	11th
Australian Championships			1st		
GP NHK Trophy			4th		
GP Skate Canada			4th	3rd	
CS Golden Spin of Zagreb	10th				WD
CS Nebelhorn Trophy	8th				
CS Warsaw Cup		1st			
Shanghai Trophy			4th		

Competition placements at junior level
Season	2021–22	2022–23
World Junior Championships	2nd	2nd
Junior Grand Prix Final		1st
JGP Austria	5th	
JGP Poland I		1st
JGP Poland II		1st
JGP Russia	5th	
Winter Star	1st	

== Detailed results ==
=== Pair skating with Anastasia Golubeva ===
ISU personal best scores in the +5/-5 GOE System
Segment	Type	Score	Event
Total	TSS	189.47	2023 World Championships
Short program	TSS	65.73	2025 World Championships
Short program	TES	36.46	2025 World Championships
Short program	PCS	29.64	2025 Four Continents Championships
Free skating	TSS	127.52	2023 World Championships
Free skating	TES	68.03	2023 World Championships
Free skating	PCS	61.04	2024 Skate Canada International

- Small medals for the short program and free skating are only awarded at ISU Championships.

==== Senior level ====
Results in the 2021–22 season
Date	Event	SP		FS		Total	
Date	Event	P	Score	P	Score	P	Score
Sep 22–25, 2021	(Germany) 2021 CS Nebelhorn Trophy	13	49.55	8	99.80	8	149.35
Dec 7–11, 2021	(Croatia) 2021 CS Golden Spin of Zagreb	13	53.41	9	110.16	10	163.57

Results in the 2022–23 season
Date	Event	SP		FS		Total	
Date	Event	P	Score	P	Score	P	Score
Nov 17–20, 2022	(Poland) 2022 CS Warsaw Cup	2	63.62	1	121.91	1	185.53
Mar 22–26, 2023	(Japan) 2023 World Championships	11	61.95	5	127.52	8	189.47

Results in the 2023–24 season
Date	Event	SP		FS		Total	
Date	Event	P	Score	P	Score	P	Score
Oct 3–5, 2023	(China) 2023 Shanghai Trophy	1	63.51	4	97.71	4	161.22
Oct 27–29, 2023	2023 Skate Canada International	3	62.80	3	116.81	4	179.61
Nov 24–26, 2023	(Japan) 2023 NHK Trophy	3	64.61	4	120.78	4	185.39
Dec 2–8, 2023	(Australia) 2023 Australian Championships	1	65.94	1	124.62	1	190.56
Jan 30, 2023 – Feb 4, 2024	(China) 2024 Four Continents Championships	7	58.79	4	125.04	4	183.83
Mar 18–24, 2024	(Canada) 2024 World Championships	11	63.35	8	119.36	10	182.71

Results in the 2024–25 season
Date	Event	SP		FS		Total	
Date	Event	P	Score	P	Score	P	Score
Oct 25–27, 2024	2024 Skate Canada International	3	64.81	3	121.33	3	186.14
Feb 19–23, 2025	(South Korea) 2025 Four Continents Championships	6	65.36	7	113.40	6	178.76
Mar 25–30, 2025	(United States) 2025 World Championships	8	65.73	9	122.51	9	188.24

Results in the 2025–26 season
Date	Event	SP		FS		Total	
Date	Event	P	Score	P	Score	P	Score
Dec 3–6, 2025	(Croatia) 2025 CS Golden Spin of Zagreb	12	49.01	—N/a	—N/a	WD	—N/a
Jan 21–25, 2026	(China) 2026 Four Continents Championships	8	59.27	11	82.68	11	141.95
Feb 15-16, 2026	(Italy) 2026 Winter Olympics	18	60.69	—N/a	—N/a	18	60.69

==== Junior level ====
Results in the 2021–22 season
Date	Event	SP		FS		Total	
Date	Event	P	Score	P	Score	P	Score
Sep 15–18, 2021	2021 JGP Russia	5	57.35	5	101.33	5	158.68
Oct 6–9, 2021	2021 JGP Austria	5	53.04	4	107.12	5	160.16
Feb 10–13, 2022	(Belarus) 2022 Winter Star	1	56.22	2	98.36	1	154.58
Apr 13–17, 2023	(Estonia) 2022 World Junior Championships	2	61.72	2	108.19	2	169.91

Results in the 2022–23 season
Date	Event	SP		FS		Total	
Date	Event	P	Score	P	Score	P	Score
Sep 28 – Oct 1, 2022	2022 JGP Poland I	1	58.03	1	108.53	1	166.56
Oct 5–8, 2022	2022 JGP Poland II	1	59.90	1	101.27	1	161.17
Dec 8–11, 2022	(Italy) 2022–23 Junior Grand Prix Final	2	60.19	1	121.18	1	181.37
Feb 27 – Mar 5, 2023	(Canada) 2023 World Junior Championships	3	59.18	2	111.18	2	170.36
