= Natasha Kuchiki =

American pair skater (born 1976)

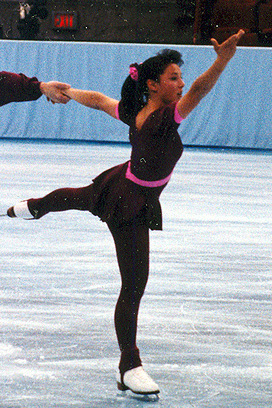

Personal information
- Full name: Natasha Maria Hanako Kuchiki
- Born: October 28, 1976 (age 49) Burbank, California

Figure skating career
- Country: United States
- Skating club: LAFSC
- Retired: 1994
Medal record
Representing the United States
Figure skating: Pairs
World Championships
Bronze medal – third place	1991 Munich	Pairs

Natasha Maria Hanako Kuchiki (born October 28, 1976) is an American former competitive pair skater. She is the 1991 World bronze medalist with Todd Sand.

== Personal life ==
Kuchiki was born in Burbank, California. Her parents, Denise and Sashi, were competitive figure skaters who met in the Ice Capades. She grew up with her parents traveling with Ice Capades until the age of five. Her parents retired from the ice shows in 1981 and settled in Los Angeles, California. Her sister, Tamara, was also a competitive figure skater.

In 2010, Kuchiki married Jamie Loper, an American figure skater who later performed in Disney On Ice shows.

== Career ==
Kuchiki's parents taught her figure skating until the age of 8 and then asked Wendy Halber Olson to coach her in singles. Her parents initially opposed her wish to skate pairs, preferring that she stay in singles, but changed their minds after seeing potential.

In 1986, Kuchiki teamed up with Richard Alexander. Training only two days a week, one session a day, the pair reached the 1987 U.S. Championships in Tacoma, Washington. Competing in junior pairs, they placed 11th in 1987, won the bronze medal in 1988 and silver in 1989. In March 1989, Kuchiki and Alexander ended their partnership. Kuchiki also finished 4th in novice ladies' at the 1988 U.S. Championships and competed in the junior ladies' event at the 1989 U.S. Championships.

Kuchiki was partnered with Todd Sand in April 1989. They won three senior pairs medals at the U.S. Championships, including gold in 1991, and competed at three World Championships, winning bronze in 1991. They also competed at the 1992 Winter Olympics, where they placed 6th. Kuchiki and Sand announced the end of their partnership in April 1992.

Kuchiki returned the following year to compete in the ladies' singles event at the 1993 U.S. Nationals, finishing 12th. In late 1993, she teamed up with Rocky Marval, with whom she finished fourth at the 1994 U.S. Championships, missing the 1994 Olympic team. Kuchiki retired from competitive skating in 1994.

== Professional career ==
In 1994, Kuchiki joined Dorothy Hamill's Ice Capades "Hansel & Gretel" production. She continued on with Ice Capades until it closed in 1997. After joining "Gershwin On Ice" for a few cities she went on to work for FELD Entertainment, Inc. in 1998 "Grease on Ice" as Frenchie until 2000. From 2000 through 2004 she played Jane in "Tarzan" in the Disney On Ice "Jungle Adventures". She learned the acrobatics aerial act called the Spanish Web, learning the aerial acrobatics with her "Tarzan" professional ice skater Jamie Loper. With Loper, Kuchiki performed tandem aerial acrobatics with skates on.

In 2004, Kuchiki joined Disney on Ice's "Beauty & the Beast" where she portrayed the role of Belle. Still with the company FELD Entertainment- Disney On Ice, she toured with Disney on Ice as a principal skater, Mulan and Jasmine in the "100 Years of Magic" show (from 2005). She retired from touring in 2015 and turned to coaching in Houston.

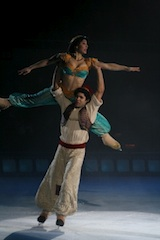
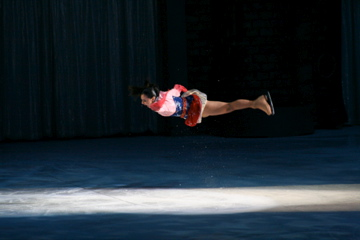

== Competitive highlights ==
=== Ladies' singles ===
Event	1993
U.S. Championships	12th

=== Pairs with Sand ===
International
Event	1989–90	1990–91	1991–92
Winter Olympics			6th
World Championships	11th	3rd	8th
Skate America		4th	6th
NHK Trophy		5th	
Skate Canada	5th		
National
U.S. Championships	2nd	1st	3rd

=== Pairs with Marval ===
Event	1994
U.S. Championships	4th

== Professional ice shows ==
- 1994–1995: Dorothy Hamills Ice Capades "Hansel & Gretel"
- 1995–1996: Ice Capades "Cinderella"
- 1996–1997: Ice Capades "The Magic of MGM"
- 1997 On Ice "Gershwin On Ice"
- 1998–2000: Feld Entertainments "Grease On Ice" portrayed the role of "Frenchie"
- 2000–2004: Disney On Ice "Jungle Adventures" portrayed the role of "Jane" in Tarzan
- 2004–2005: Disney On Ice "Beauty and the Beast" portrayed the role of "Belle"
- 2007 Disney's "High School Musical" portrayed the role of "Gabriella"
- 2005–2015: Disney On Ice "100 Years of Magic" portrays the role of "Mulan" and "Jasmine"
