= Daniel Tioumentsev =

American pair skater

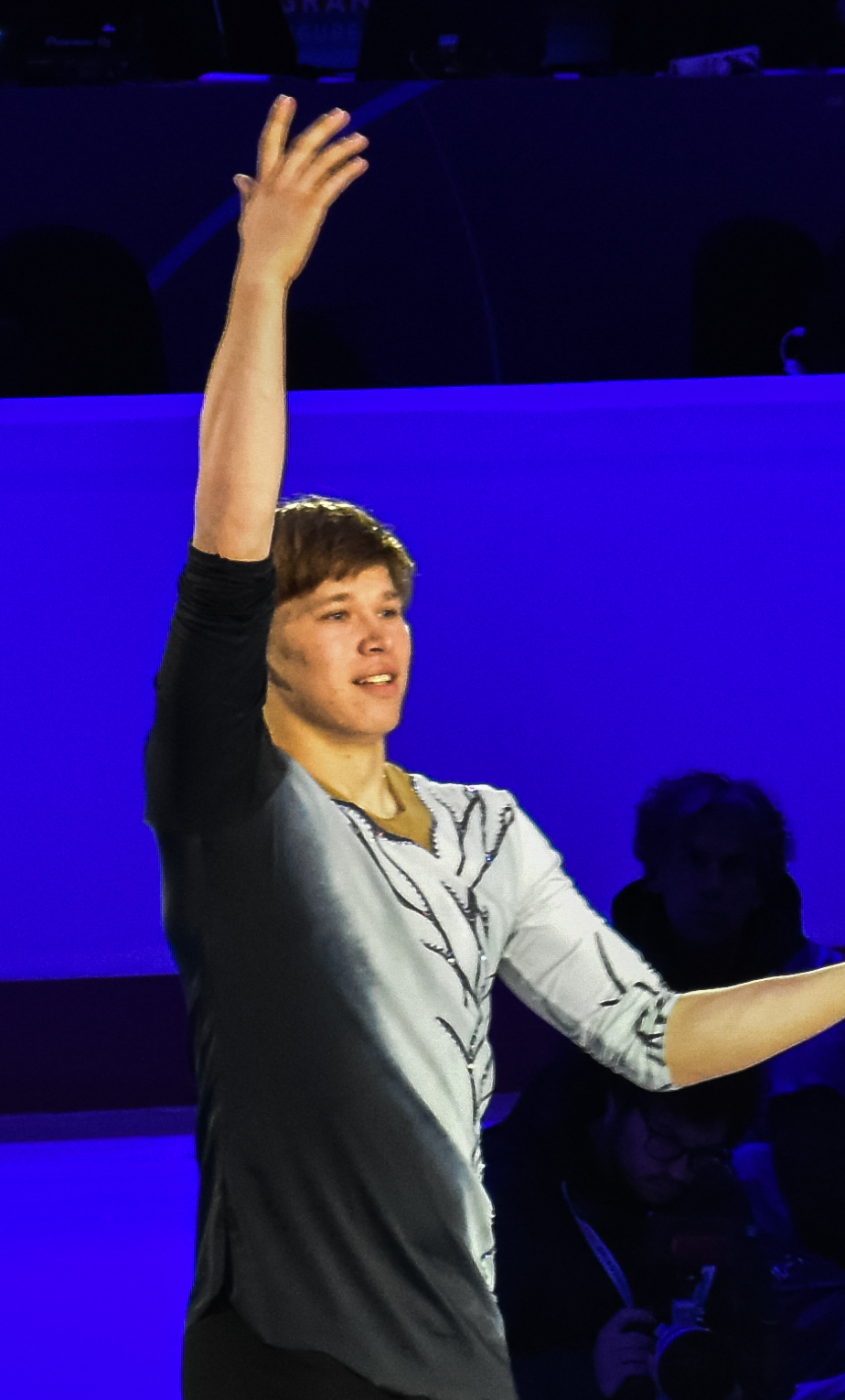
- Tioumentsev at the 2022–23 Grand Prix of Figure Skating Final in 2022

Personal information
- Born: March 14, 2002 (age 24) El Paso, Texas
- Home town: Irvine, California

Figure skating career
- Country: United States
- Discipline: Pair skating
- Coach: Todd Sand, Jenni Meno, Chris Knierim, Christine Fowler-Binder
- Skating club: Dallas Figure Skating Club

Medal record
World Junior Championships
Gold medal – first place	2023 Calgary	Pairs
Junior Grand Prix Final
Silver medal – second place	2022–23 Turin	Pairs

Daniel Tioumentsev (born March 14, 2002) is an American pair skater. With former skating partner, Sophia Baram, he is the 2023 World Junior champion, 2022–23 Junior Grand Prix Final silver medalist, the 2022 JGP Czech Republic champion, the 2022 JGP Poland II bronze medalist, and the 2022 U.S. junior national champion.

== Personal life ==
Tioumentsev was born on March 14, 2002, in El Paso, Texas, to parents Andrei, an electrical engineer, and Anna, a figure skating coach. He has a brother, Dimitri. Tioumentsev is a graduate of Palmer Ridge High School and studied mechanical engineering at Irvine Valley College. In 2023, he began working at SpaceX as well as attending Arizona State University, where he is currently pursuing a mechanical engineering degree.

== Career ==
=== Early career ===
Tioumentsev began figure skating at the age of three.

From 2014 to 2020, Tioumentsev competed as a singles skater before ultimately deciding to focus on pairs skating.

His early pair partners included Sydney Flaum, Sarah Burden, Natasha Mishkutionok, and Alexandra Prudsky. With Mishkutionok, he won gold in juvenile at the 2018 U.S. Championships and silver in intermediate at the 2019 U.S. Championships.

He ultimately teamed up with Sophia Baram in April 2021.

=== 2021–22 season ===
Baram/Tioumentsev made their debut together at the 2021 USCS Nevada and 2021 USCS Massachusetts, winning both events.

They then went on to win gold at the 2022 U.S. Junior Championships by over twenty points.

=== 2022–23 season: World Junior champion and Junior Grand Prix Final silver ===
Baram/Tioumentsev debuted internationally on the 2022–23 Junior Grand Prix series. They won the bronze medal at the 2022 JGP Poland II and gold at the 2022 JGP Czech Republic, ultimately qualifying for the 2022–23 Junior Grand Prix Final in Turin, Italy and won the silver medal.

The pair went on to compete at the 2023 Midwestern Sectional Championships, winning the gold medal.

At the Final, Baram/Tioumentsev won the short program, 3.43 points over Anastasia Golubeva / Hektor Giotopoulos Moore of Australia. They then went on to place second in the free skate and won the silver medal behind the Australians.

Competing as a senior pair team at the 2023 U.S. Championships, Baram/Tioumentsev won the pewter medal.

Selected to represent the United States at the 2023 World Junior Championships, Baram/Tioumentsev won the short program, scoring a personal best in the process. The morning of the free skate, Baram/Tioumentsev's coach, Todd Sand, suffered a heart attack and had to be hospitalized in the Intensive Care Unit. As a result, Baram/Tioumentsev had to skate the free skate without a coach. Despite this, the pair won the free skate and ultimately won the event, secure a gold medal, scoring personal best free skate and combined total scores in the process. Following the event, Tioumentsev said, "We skated for Todd and for everyone that has helped us through the season. It was very hard, and we tried to remember what Todd told us – to stay in the moment."

In August 2023, Baram/Tioumentsev announced that they ended their partnership due to Tioumentsev wishing to focus on his studies at Arizona State University as well as his job at SpaceX. Regardless, Tioumentsev stated that he had no plans to retire but rather take a break from figure skating.

== Programs ==
=== Pair skating with Sophia Baram ===
Season	Short program	Free skating	Exhibition
2022–2023	Bla Bla Bla Cha Cha Cha by Petty Booka choreo. by Cindy Stuart	Pilgrims on a Long Journey by Cœur de pirate; Primavera by Ludovico Einaudi choreo. by Cindy Stuart	Party Rock Anthem by LMFAO; Everything Is Awesome (from The Lego Movie) performed by Jo Li

== Competitive highlights ==
=== Pair skating with Sophia Baram ===
- JGP – Event of the ISU Junior Grand Prix Series

Competition placements at senior level
Season	2022–23
U.S. Championships	4th

Competition placements at junior level
Season	2021–22	2022–23
World Junior Championships		1st
Junior Grand Prix Final		2nd
U.S. Championships	1st	
JGP Czech Republic		1st
JGP Poland		3rd

== Detailed results ==
=== Pair skating with Sophia Baram ===
==== Senior level ====
Results in the 2022–23 season
Date	Event	SP		FS		Total	
Date	Event	P	Score	P	Score	P	Score
Jan 23–29, 2023	(United States) 2023 U.S. Championships	5	63.12	4	115.96	4	179.08

==== Junior level ====
Results in the 2021–22 season
Date	Event	SP		FS		Total	
Date	Event	P	Score	P	Score	P	Score
Jan 3–9, 2022	(United States) 2022 U.S. Championships (Junior)	1	62.26	1	109.10	1	171.36

Results in the 2022–23 season
Date	Event	SP		FS		Total	
Date	Event	P	Score	P	Score	P	Score
Aug 31 – Sep 3, 2022	2022 JGP Czech Republic	1	63.77	1	107.59	1	171.36
Oct 5–8, 2022	2022 JGP Poland II	2	56.33	3	96.16	3	152.49
Dec 8–11, 2022	(Italy) 2022–23 Junior Grand Prix Final	1	63.62	2	113.16	2	176.78
Feb 27 – Mar 5, 2023	(Canada) 2023 World Junior Championships	1	66.95	1	116.52	1	183.47
