= Sydney Figure Skating Club =

Ice figure skating club in Australia

The Sydney Figure Skating Club was founded in 1961 and is the oldest continually existing figure skating club in Australia and the Southern Hemisphere.
