= 2023 World Junior Figure Skating Championships =

Figure skating competition

- Type: ISU Championship
- Date: February 27 – March 5
- Season: 2022–23
- Location: Calgary, Canada
- Host: Skate Canada
- Venue: WinSport – Arena A

Champions
- Men's singles: (Japan) Kao Miura
- Women's singles: (Japan) Mao Shimada
- Pairs: (United States) Sophia Baram / Daniel Tioumentsev
- Ice dance: (Czech Republic) Kateřina Mrázková / Daniel Mrázek
- Previous: 2022 World Junior Championships
- Next: 2024 World Junior Championships

The 2023 World Junior Figure Skating Championships was held in Calgary, Canada, from February 27 to March 5, 2023. Medals were awarded in men's singles, women's singles, pairs, and ice dance. The competition determined the entry quotas for each federation at the 2024 World Junior Championships.

On March 1, 2022, the ISU banned figure skaters and officials from Russia and Belarus from attending all international competitions due to the 2022 Russian invasion of Ukraine.

== Qualification ==
=== Age and minimum TES requirements ===
Skaters were eligible for the 2023 World Junior Championships if they turned 13 years of age before July 1, 2022, and if they have not yet turned 19 (singles and females of the other two disciplines) or 21 (male pair skaters and ice dancers).

Additionally, skaters must meet the minimum technical elements score requirements. The ISU accepts scores if they were obtained at junior-level ISU-recognized international competitions during the ongoing or preceding season, no later than 21 days before the first official practice day.

Minimum technical scores (TES)
Discipline	SP / RD	FS / FD
Men	25	44
Women	25	40
Pairs	23	34
Ice dance	24	38

- SP/RD and FS/FD scores may be attained at different events.

=== Number of entries per discipline ===
Based on the results of the 2022 World Junior Championships, each ISU member nation could field one to three entries per discipline. China did not participate due to COVID-19 protocols, and could only field one entry.

Number of entries per discipline
Spots	Men	Women	Pairs	Ice dance
3	Canada; Kazakhstan; United States	South Korea; United States	Australia; Canada; Georgia	Canada; United States
2	Estonia; Italy; Japan; Sweden; Switzerland	Estonia; Japan; Switzerland	Czech Republic; France; Germany; Italy; Ukraine; United States	Cyprus; France; Germany; Great Britain; South Korea

- If not listed above, only one entry was allowed.

== Entries ==
Member nations began announcing their selections in December 2022. The International Skating Union published entries on February 7, 2023.

Entries - 2023 World Junior Figure Skating Championships
Country	Men	Women	Pairs	Ice dance
Armenia	Semen Daniliants	—		—
Australia	—	Vlada Vasiliev	Anastasia Golubeva / Hektor Giotopoulos Moore	—
Austria	Tobia Oellerer	Hannah Frank	—	Anita Straub / Andreas Straub
Belgium	—	Jade Hovine	—	Sofiia Beznosikova / Max Archadi Brunovitch Leleu
Bulgaria	Filip Kaymakchiev	Chiara Hristova	—	—
Canada	Wesley Chiu	Kaiya Ruiter	Ava Kemp / Yohnatan Elizarov	Nadiia Bashynska / Peter Beaumont
Canada	Aleksa Rakic	—	Chloe Panetta / Kieran Thrasher	Sandrine Gauthier / Quentin Thieren
Canada	Edward Vasii	—	Ashlyn Schmitz / Tristan Taylor	Hailey Yu / Brendan Giang
China	Chen Yudong	An Xiangyi	Yang Yixi / Deng Shunyang	Li Xuantong / Wang Xinkang
Chinese Taipei	Li Yu-Hsiang	—	—	—
Cyprus	—	Stefania Yakovleva	—	Angelina Kudryavtseva / Ilia Karankevich
Czech Republic	—	Barbora Tykalová	Barbora Kuciánová / Lukáš Vochozka	Kateřina Mrázková / Daniel Mrázek
Denmark	—	Babeth Hansson-Östergaard	—	
Estonia	Arlet Levandi	Maria Eliise Kaljuvere	—	
Estonia	Jegor Martsenko	Niina Petrõkina	—	
Finland	Makar Suntsev	Iida Karhunen	—	
France	François Pitot	Lorine Schild	Louise Ehrhard / Matthis Pellegris	Louise Bordet / Thomas Gipoulou
France	—		Oxana Vouillamoz / Flavien Giniaux	Celina Fradji / Jean-Hans Fourneaux
Georgia	Konstantin Supatashvili	Inga Gurgenidze	—	Grace Elizabeth Vainik / Yehor Barshak
Germany	Hugo Willi Herrmann	Olesya Ray	Aliyah Ackermann / Tobija Harms	Darya Grimm / Michail Savitskiy
Germany	—		Sonja Löwenherz / Robert Löwenherz	Karla Maria Karl / Kai Hoferichter
Great Britain	Edward Appleby	Alexa Severn	—	Phebe Bekker / James Hernandez
Great Britain	—	—	—	Ashlie Slatter / Atl Ongay-Perez
Greece	—	Stella Makri	—	—
Hong Kong	Zhao Heung Lai	Tsz Ching Chan	—	—
Hungary	Aleksandr Vlasenko	Polina Dzsumanyijazova	—	Maya Benkiewicz / Mark Shapiro
Israel	Lev Vinokur	Gabriella Grinberg	—	Elizabeth Tkachenko / Alexei Kiliakov
Italy	Nikolaj Memola	Anna Pezzetta	—	Noemi Maria Tali / Stefano Frasca
Italy	Raffaele Francesco Zich	—	—	—
Japan	Kao Miura	Ami Nakai	Haruna Murakami / Sumitada Moriguchi	Nao Kida / Masaya Morita
Japan	Nozomu Yoshioka	Mao Shimada	—	—
Kazakhstan	Rakhat Bralin	Anna Levkovets	—	—
Kazakhstan	Dias Jirenbayev	—	—	—
Kazakhstan	Oleg Melnikov	—	—	—
Latvia	Kirills Korkacs	Nikola Fomchenkova	—	—
Lithuania	Daniel Korabelnik	Daria Afinogenova	—	—
Malaysia	—	Katherine Ong Pui Kuan	—	—
Mexico	—	Natalia Acosta Moises	—	Harlow Lynella Stanley / Nikita Sosnenko
Netherlands	—	Julia Van Dijk	—	—
New Zealand	Li Yanhao	—	—	—
Norway	—	Oda Tønnesen Havgar	—	—
Philippines	—	Sofia Lexi Jacqueline Frank	—	—
Poland	Jakub Lofek	Noelle Streuli	—	Sofiia Dovhal / Wiktor Kulesza
Romania	—	Ana Sofia Beschea	—	—
Slovakia	Adam Hagara	Vanesa Šelmeková	—	—
Slovenia	David Sedej	Zoja Kramar	—	—
South Korea	Kim Hyun-gyeom	Kim Yu-jae	—	Hannah Lim / Ye Quan
South Korea	—	Kwon Min-sol	—	Kim Jinny / Lee Na-mu
South Korea	—	Shin Ji-a	—	—
Spain	Adrián Jimenez de Baldomero	—	—	Athena Faith Roberts / Eric Alis
Sweden	Casper Johansson	Nina Fredriksson	—	—
Sweden	Andreas Nordebäck	—	—	—
Switzerland	Noah Bodenstein	Livia Kaiser	—	Milla O'Brien / Laurin Wiederkehr
Switzerland	Naoki Rossi	Kimmy Repond	—	—
Thailand	—	Phattaratida Kaneshige	—	—
Turkey	Ali Efe Güneş	Fatma Yade Karlıklı	—	Irmak Yücel / Nikita Ivanov
Ukraine	Kyrylo Marsak	Sofiia Hryhorenko	Violetta Sierova / Ivan Khobta	Mariia Pinchuk / Mykyta Pogorielov
United States	Lucas Broussard	Josephine Lee	Sophia Baram / Daniel Tioumentsev	Helena Carhart / Volodymyr Horovyi
United States	Daniel Martynov	Soho Lee	Naomi Williams / Lachlan Lewer	Jenna Hauer / Benjamin Starr
United States	Michael Xie	Clare Seo	—	Leah Neset / Artem Markelov

=== Changes to preliminary assignments ===
Changes to preliminary assignments
Date	Discipline	Withdrew	Added	Reason	Ref.
February 17	Women	(Switzerland) Sarina Joos	(Switzerland) Livia Kaiser		
February 17	Women	(Turkey) Anna Deniz Özdemir	(Turkey) Fatma Yade Karlıklı		
February 22	Women	(Kyrgyzstan) Zhasmin Shlaga			
February 25	Men	(United States) Robert Yampolsky	(United States) Michael Xie		
March 3	Ice dance	(Slovakia) Anna Šimová / Kirill Aksenov		Visa issue	

== Medal summary ==
=== Medalists ===
Medals awarded to the skaters who achieved the highest overall placements in each discipline:

Discipline	Gold	Silver	Bronze
Men	(Japan) Kao Miura	(Switzerland) Naoki Rossi	(Japan) Nozomu Yoshioka
Women	(Japan) Mao Shimada	(South Korea) Shin Ji-a	(Japan) Ami Nakai
Pairs	(United States) Sophia Baram / Daniel Tioumentsev	(Australia) Anastasia Golubeva / Hektor Giotopoulos Moore	(Ukraine) Violetta Sierova / Ivan Khobta
Ice dance	(Czech Republic) Kateřina Mrázková / Daniel Mrázek	(South Korea) Hannah Lim / Ye Quan	(Canada) Nadiia Bashynska / Peter Beaumont

Small medals awarded to the skaters who achieved the highest short program or rhythm dance placements in each discipline:

Discipline	Gold	Silver	Bronze
Men	(Japan) Kao Miura	(Canada) Wesley Chiu	(Switzerland) Naoki Rossi
Women	(Japan) Mao Shimada	(South Korea) Shin Ji-a	(Japan) Ami Nakai
Pairs	(United States) Sophia Baram / Daniel Tioumentsev	(France) Oxana Vouillamoz / Flavien Giniaux	(Australia) Anastasia Golubeva / Hektor Giotopoulos Moore
Ice dance	(Czech Republic) Kateřina Mrázková / Daniel Mrázek	(South Korea) Hannah Lim / Ye Quan	(United Kingdom) Phebe Bekker / James Hernandez

Small medals awarded to the skaters who achieved the highest free skating or free dance placements in each discipline:

Discipline	Gold	Silver	Bronze
Men	(Japan) Kao Miura	(Japan) Nozomu Yoshioka	(Switzerland) Naoki Rossi
Women	(Japan) Mao Shimada	(South Korea) Shin Ji-a	(Japan) Ami Nakai
Pairs	(United States) Sophia Baram / Daniel Tioumentsev	(Australia) Anastasia Golubeva / Hektor Giotopoulos Moore	(Ukraine) Violetta Sierova / Ivan Khobta
Ice dance	(Czech Republic) Kateřina Mrázková / Daniel Mrázek	(South Korea) Hannah Lim / Ye Quan	(Canada) Nadiia Bashynska / Peter Beaumont

=== Medals by country ===
Table of medals for overall placement:

Rank	Nation	Gold	Silver	Bronze	Total
1	Japan	2	0	2	4
2	Czech Republic	1	0	0	1
2	United States	1	0	0	1
4	South Korea	0	2	0	2
5	Australia	0	1	0	1
5	Switzerland	0	1	0	1
7	Canada	0	0	1	1
7	Ukraine	0	0	1	1
Totals (8 entries)		4	4	4	12

== Records and achievements ==
The following new junior ISU best scores were set during this season:

Disc.	Segment	Skater(s)	Score	Date	Ref.
Ice dance	Total score	(Czech Republic) Kateřina Mrázková / Daniel Mrázek	177.36	March 4, 2023	

== Results ==
=== Men ===
Men's results
Rank	Name	Nation	Total points	SP		FS	
1st place, gold medalist(s)	Kao Miura	Japan	264.74	1	85.11	1	179.63
2nd place, silver medalist(s)	Naoki Rossi	Switzerland	220.68	3	79.46	3	141.22
3rd place, bronze medalist(s)	Nozomu Yoshioka	Japan	217.79	7	76.44	2	141.35
4	Nikolaj Memola	Italy	216.44	6	76.72	4	139.72
5	Wesley Chiu	Canada	213.88	2	80.56	8	133.32
6	Kim Hyun-gyeom	South Korea	213.56	8	75.77	6	137.79
7	Lucas Broussard	United States	209.47	4	77.01	9	132.46
8	Chen Yudong	China	205.12	14	65.93	5	139.19
9	Arlet Levandi	Estonia	204.73	12	71.01	7	133.72
10	Daniel Martynov	United States	204.67	10	73.93	10	130.74
11	Andreas Nordebäck	Sweden	204.32	5	76.82	12	127.90
12	François Pitot	France	202.43	9	74.91	13	127.52
13	Aleksa Rakic	Canada	200.94	11	71.34	11	129.60
14	Adam Hagara	Slovakia	193.35	13	66.71	14	126.64
15	Kyrylo Marsak	Ukraine	191.65	15	65.55	15	126.10
16	Dias Jirenbayev	Kazakhstan	182.86	22	59.77	16	123.09
17	Edward Appleby	Great Britain	173.87	17	62.49	18	111.38
18	Konstantin Supatashvili	Georgia	173.70	24	58.97	17	114.73
19	Jakub Lofek	Poland	170.42	20	60.95	19	109.47
20	Rakhat Bralin	Kazakhstan	166.47	19	62.47	21	104.00
21	Aleksandr Vlasenko	Hungary	166.41	21	60.65	20	105.76
22	Raffaele Francesco Zich	Italy	165.19	18	62.48	22	102.71
23	Casper Johansson	Sweden	161.91	23	59.25	23	102.66
24	Noah Bodenstein	Switzerland	158.32	16	62.73	24	95.49
Did not advance to free skating
25	Lev Vinokur	Israel	58.90	25	58.90	—	
26	Yanhao Li	New Zealand	57.88	26	57.88	—	
27	Edward Vasii	Canada	57.22	27	57.22	—	
28	Li Yu-Hsiang	Chinese Taipei	56.67	28	56.67	—	
29	Makar Suntsev	Finland	56.49	29	56.49	—	
30	David Sedej	Slovenia	55.62	30	55.62	—	
31	Jegor Martsenko	Estonia	55.58	31	55.58	—	
32	Ali Efe Güneş	Turkey	55.16	32	55.16	—	
33	Hugo Willi Herrmann	Germany	54.71	33	54.71	—	
34	Michael Xie	United States	53.46	34	53.46	—	
35	Oleg Melnikov	Kazakhstan	51.79	35	51.79	—	
36	Zhao Heung Lai	Hong Kong	51.50	36	51.50	—	
37	Semen Daniliants	Armenia	50.79	37	50.79	—	
38	Adrián Jiménez de Baldomero	Spain	46.43	38	46.43	—	
39	Kirills Korkacs	Latvia	45.40	39	45.40	—	
40	Tobia Oellerer	Austria	43.85	40	43.85	—	
41	Daniel Korabelnik	Lithuania	38.12	41	38.12	—	
42	Filip Kaymakchiev	Bulgaria	36.28	42	36.28	—	

=== Women ===
Women's results
Rank	Name	Nation	Total points	SP		FS	
1st place, gold medalist(s)	Mao Shimada	Japan	224.54	1	71.78	1	152.76
2nd place, silver medalist(s)	Shin Ji-a	South Korea	201.90	2	71.19	2	130.71
3rd place, bronze medalist(s)	Ami Nakai	Japan	197.40	3	67.28	3	130.12
4	Kim Yu-jae	South Korea	193.62	4	63.97	4	129.65
5	Kwon Min-sol	South Korea	191.06	6	62.82	5	128.24
6	An Xiangyi	China	183.94	5	63.91	8	120.03
7	Kimmy Repond	Switzerland	180.32	10	57.96	6	122.36
8	Clare Seo	United States	172.62	9	58.41	9	114.21
9	Inga Gurgenidze	Georgia	172.50	19	52.02	7	120.48
10	Kaiya Ruiter	Canada	169.65	11	57.71	11	111.94
11	Lorine Schild	France	168.35	7	61.04	13	107.31
12	Niina Petrõkina	Estonia	167.48	15	55.67	12	111.81
13	Nikola Fomchenkova	Latvia	166.03	17	53.16	10	112.87
14	Maria Eliise Kaljuvere	Estonia	161.08	8	58.42	14	102.66
15	Soho Lee	United States	149.16	16	54.23	15	94.93
16	Polina Dzsumanyijazova	Hungary	144.88	12	57.35	17	87.53
17	Stefania Yakovleva	Cyprus	144.23	22	50.08	16	94.15
18	Noelle Streuli	Poland	140.59	13	56.40	19	84.19
19	Josephine Lee	United States	138.22	14	56.09	21	82.13
20	Barbora Tykalová	Czech Republic	136.07	20	50.41	18	85.66
21	Phattaratida Kaneshige	Thailand	133.18	21	50.11	20	83.07
22	Livia Kaiser	Switzerland	130.95	18	52.71	23	78.24
23	Jade Hovine	Belgium	127.68	24	48.57	22	79.11
24	Julia van Dijk	Netherlands	117.90	23	48.58	24	69.32
Did not advance to free skating
25	Gabriella Grinberg	Israel	47.99	25	47.99	—	
26	Iida Karhunen	Finland	47.82	26	47.82	—	
27	Anna Pezzetta	Italy	47.47	27	47.47	—	
28	Vanesa Šelmeková	Slovakia	47.16	28	47.16	—	
29	Olesya Ray	Germany	44.97	29	44.97	—	
30	Hannah Frank	Austria	44.59	30	44.59	—	
31	Zoja Kramar	Slovenia	42.97	31	42.97	—	
32	Nina Fredriksson	Sweden	42.44	32	42.44	—	
33	Natalia Acosta Moisés	Mexico	42.40	33	42.40	—	
34	Fatma Yade Karlıklı	Turkey	42.15	34	42.15	—	
35	Anna Levkovets	Kazakhstan	40.47	35	40.47	—	
36	Katherine Ong Pui Kuan	Malaysia	40.24	36	40.24	—	
37	Babeth Hansson-Östergaard	Denmark	40.08	37	40.08	—	
38	Alexa Severn	Great Britain	39.14	38	39.14	—	
39	Oda Tønnesen Havgar	Norway	38.66	39	38.66	—	
40	Daria Afinogenova	Lithuania	38.05	40	38.05	—	
41	Sofia Lexi Jacqueline Frank	Philippines	37.05	41	37.05	—	
42	Vlada Vasiliev	Australia	36.93	42	36.93	—	
43	Tsz Ching Chan	Hong Kong	36.32	43	36.32	—	
44	Ana-Sofia Beschea	Romania	36.06	44	36.06	—	
45	Stella Makri	Greece	35.59	45	35.59	—	
46	Chiara Hristova	Bulgaria	35.08	46	35.08	—	
47	Sofiia Hryhorenko	Ukraine	28.64	47	28.64	—	

=== Pairs ===
Pairs' results
Rank	Name	Nation	Total points	SP		FS	
1st place, gold medalist(s)	Sophia Baram / Daniel Tioumentsev	United States	183.47	1	66.95	1	116.52
2nd place, silver medalist(s)	Anastasia Golubeva / Hektor Giotopoulos Moore	Australia	170.36	3	59.18	2	111.18
3rd place, bronze medalist(s)	Violetta Sierova / Ivan Khobta	Ukraine	159.39	4	58.47	3	100.92
4	Haruna Murakami / Sumitada Moriguchi	Japan	154.71	6	55.69	4	99.02
5	Oxana Vouillamoz / Flavien Giniaux	France	153.59	2	60.58	6	93.01
6	Ava Kemp / Yohnatan Elizarov	Canada	149.03	5	55.88	5	93.15
7	Naomi Williams / Lachlan Lewer	United States	145.05	7	52.13	7	92.92
8	Chloe Panetta / Kieran Thrasher	Canada	135.73	9	47.41	8	88.32
9	Barbora Kuciánová / Lukáš Vochozka	Czech Republic	132.15	8	48.38	10	83.77
10	Yang Yixi / Deng Shunyang	China	131.97	10	47.19	9	84.78
11	Ashlyn Schmitz / Tristan Taylor	Canada	118.92	11	45.83	12	73.09
12	Louise Ehrhard / Matthis Pellegris	France	113.75	13	40.43	11	73.75
13	Aliyah Ackermann / Tobija Harms	Germany	110.44	12	40.96	14	69.48
14	Sonja Löwenherz / Robert Löwenherz	Germany	104.25	14	34.24	13	70.01

=== Ice dance ===
Ice dance results
Rank	Name	Nation	Total points	RD		FD	
1st place, gold medalist(s)	Kateřina Mrázková / Daniel Mrázek	Czech Republic	177.36	1	71.19	1	106.17
2nd place, silver medalist(s)	Hannah Lim / Ye Quan	South Korea	174.39	2	71.08	2	103.31
3rd place, bronze medalist(s)	Nadiia Bashynska / Peter Beaumont	Canada	169.13	4	68.00	3	101.13
4	Phebe Bekker / James Hernandez	Great Britain	169.07	3	68.89	4	100.18
5	Leah Neset / Artem Markelov	United States	162.59	7	64.01	5	98.58
6	Célina Fradji / Jean-Hans Fourneaux	France	156.92	5	65.81	8	91.11
7	Sandrine Gauthier / Quentin Thieren	Canada	156.65	8	63.09	6	93.56
8	Jenna Hauer / Benjamin Starr	United States	154.12	9	62.05	7	92.07
9	Helena Carhart / Volodymyr Horovyi	United States	149.87	11	61.34	9	88.53
10	Angelina Kudryavtseva / Ilia Karankevich	Cyprus	149.86	10	61.35	10	88.51
11	Elizabeth Tkachenko / Alexei Kiliakov	Israel	147.85	13	59.72	11	88.13
12	Mariia Pinchuk / Mykyta Pogorielov	Ukraine	145.31	12	60.91	12	84.40
13	Louise Bordet / Thomas Gipoulou	France	141.56	15	57.59	13	83.97
14	Hailey Yu / Brendan Giang	Canada	140.71	14	57.96	14	82.75
15	Karla Maria Karl / Kai Hoferichter	Germany	138.57	17	56.08	16	82.49
16	Nao Kida / Masaya Morita	Japan	136.72	18	54.19	15	82.53
17	Noemi Maria Tali / Stefano Frasca	Italy	135.81	16	56.89	18	78.92
18	Ashlie Slatter / Atl Ongay-Perez	Great Britain	132.91	20	53.95	17	78.96
19	Grace Elizabeth Vainik / Yehor Barshak	Georgia	126.54	19	54.15	19	72.39
WD	Darya Grimm / Michail Savitskiy	Germany	withdrew	6	65.67	withdrew from competition	
Did not advance to free dance
21	Milla O'Brien / Laurin Wiederkehr	Switzerland	49.75	21	49.75	—	
22	Li Xuantong / Wang Xinkang	China	49.25	22	49.25	—	
23	Sofiia Dovhal / Wiktor Kulesza	Poland	49.16	23	49.16	—	
24	Anita Straub / Andreas Straub	Austria	46.85	24	46.85	—	
25	Kim Jinny / Lee Na-mu	South Korea	46.37	25	46.37	—	
26	Athena Faith Roberts / Eric Alis	Spain	46.06	26	46.06	—	
27	Irmak Yücel / Nikita Ivanov	Turkey	41.74	27	41.74	—	
28	Maya Benkiewicz / Mark Shapiro	Hungary	40.94	28	40.94	—	
29	Sofiia Beznosikova / Max Archadi Brunovitch Leleu	Belgium	40.49	29	40.49	—	
30	Harlow Lynella Stanley / Nikita Sosnenko	Mexico	39.65	30	39.65	—	
