= Daniel Mrázek =

Czech ice dancer (born 2003)

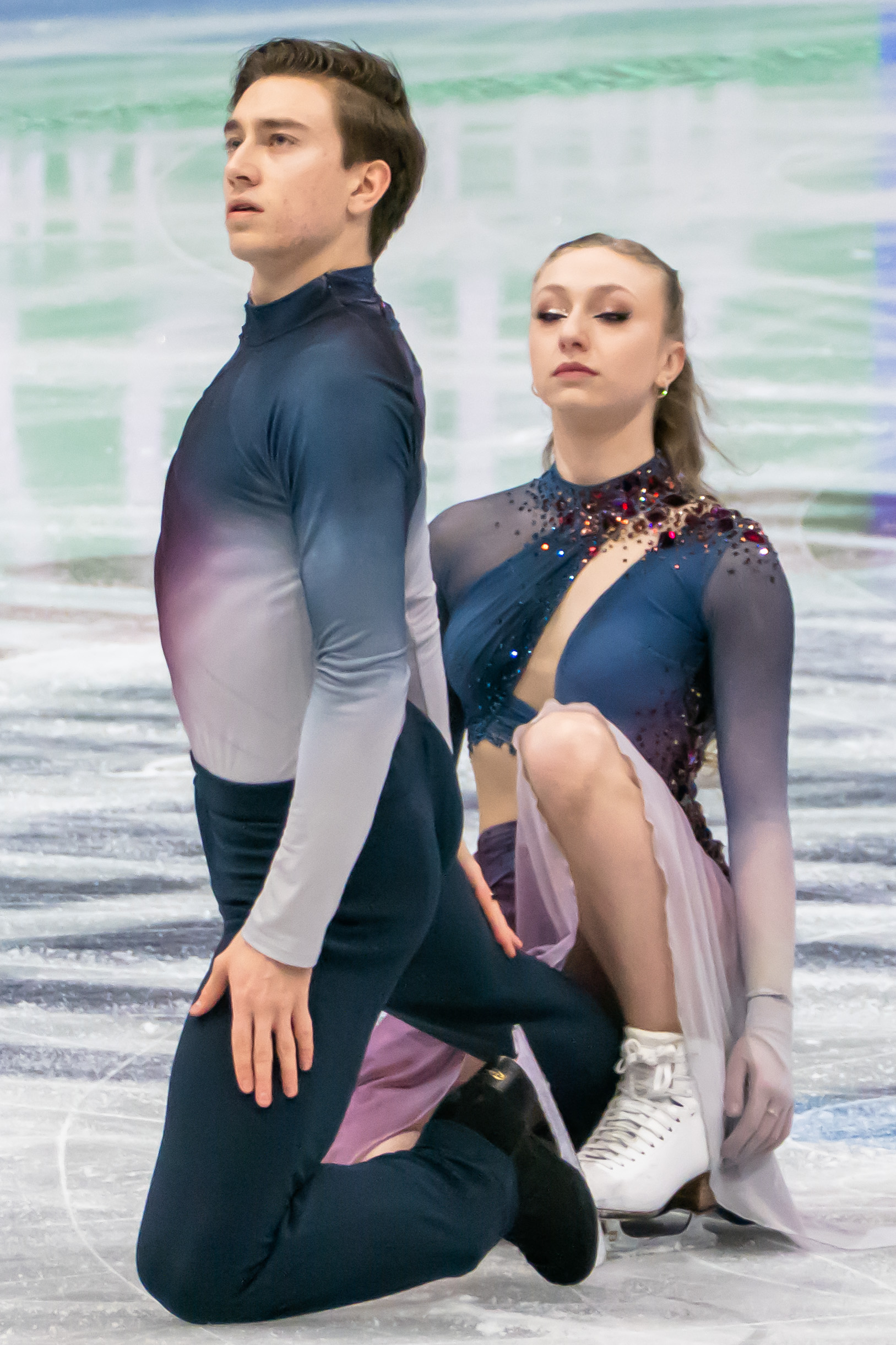
- Daniel Mrázek (with Kateřina Mrázková) at the 2025 World Championships

Personal information
- Born: 15 May 2003 (age 23) Nymburk, Czech Republic
- Height: 1.76 m (5 ft 9 in)

Figure skating career
- Country: Czech Republic
- Discipline: Men's singles (2008–20); Ice dance (since 2021)
- Partner: Kateřina Mrázková
- Coach: Matteo Zanni; Barbora Řezníčková; Katharina Müller; Denis Lodola; Francesco Corazza
- Skating club: KK Nymburk
- Began skating: 2008

Medal record
Czech Championships
Gold medal – first place	2024 Turnov	Ice dance
Gold medal – first place	2026 Prešov	Ice dance
Silver medal – second place	2025 Cieszyn	Ice dance
Bronze medal – third place	2019 Budapest	Singles
World Junior Championships
Gold medal – first place	2023 Calgary	Ice dance
Junior Grand Prix Final
Bronze medal – third place	2022–23 Turin	Ice dance

Daniel Mrázek (born 15 May 2003) is a Czech ice dancer. With his sister and skating partner, Kateřina Mrázková, he competed at the 2026 Winter Olympics. He is also the 2026 Skate America bronze medalist, a three-time Challenger Series medalist, and two-time Czech national champion (2024, 2026).

== Personal life ==
Mrázek was born on 15 May 2003 in Nymburk, Czech Republic. He attends the Palacký University in Olomouc.

== Career ==
=== Early career ===
As a single skater, Daniel Mrázek appeared twice on the 2018 Junior Grand Prix circuit – finishing fifteenth in Ostrava and thirteenth in Linz – and won the bronze medal at the 2019 Czech Junior Championships. In his final season of competition, he was part of the Czech team for the 2020 Winter Youth Olympics, finishing eleventh in the boys' event. He won the silver medal at the Christmas Cup, his lone senior international appearance. Following the end of the season, he switched his focus to ice dance and partnered with his younger sister, Kateřina Mrázková.

Mrázková and Mrázek made their competitive debut internationally at the 2021 Egna Dance Trophy, finishing in sixth place. The next season, they made their Junior Grand Prix debut, finishing fourth in both Courchevel and Košice. They went on to win both the 2021 Pavel Roman Memorial and the 2021 Trophée Métropole Nice Côte d'Azur, and finished second at the 2021 Ice Challenge. They finished second at the 2022 Four Nationals Figure Skating Championships, which also served as the Czech national championships for junior-level ice dance. They ended the season by winning the 2022 Egna Dance Trophy.

=== 2022–23 season ===
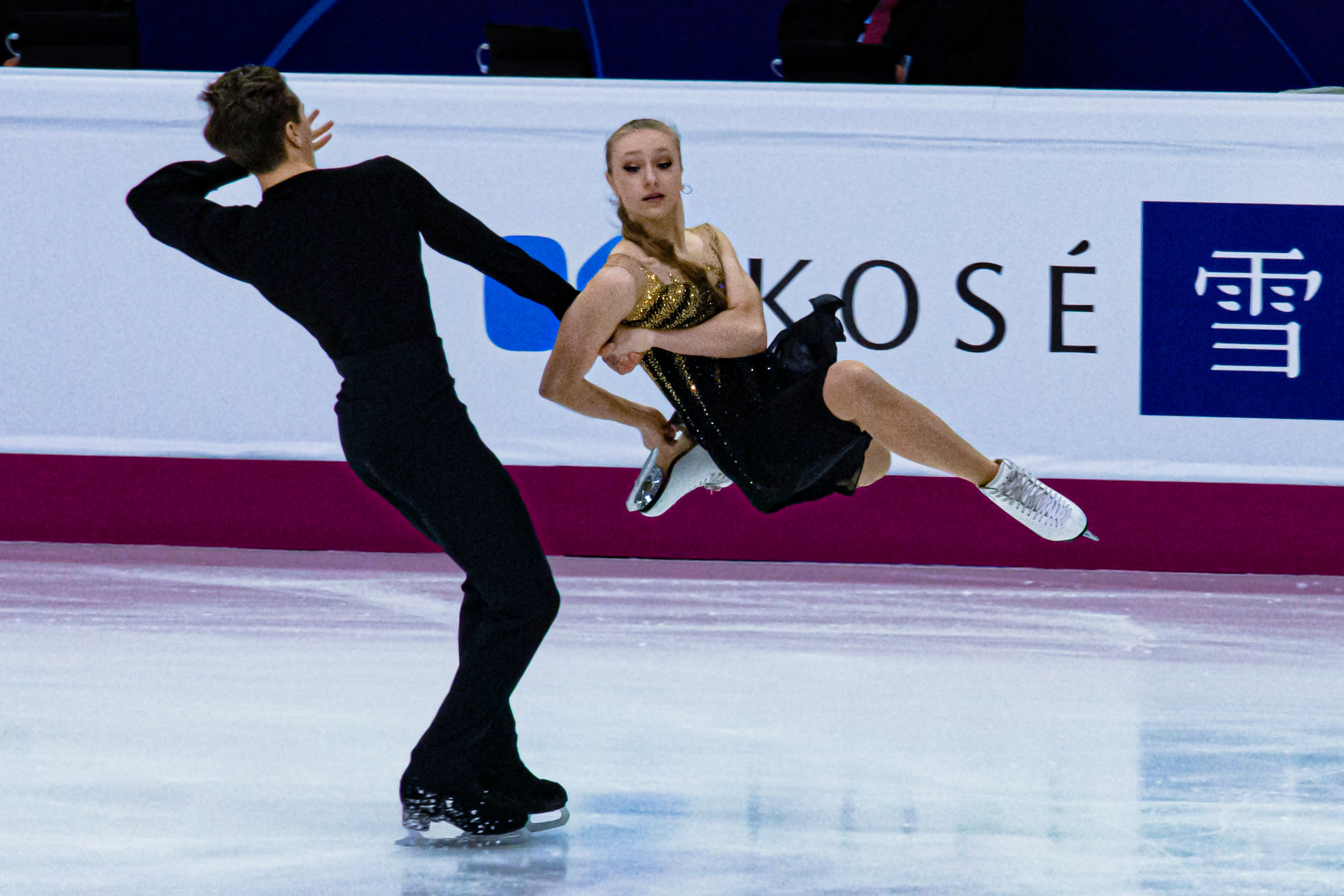
Daniel Mrázek and Kateřina Mrázková perform at the 2022–23 Junior Grand Prix Final in Turin.

Mrázková and Mrázek began their season with back-to-back Junior Grand Prix wins in Ostrava and Egna. In Ostrava, they set a new junior world record in the rhythm dance, and their gold medal was the first for a Czech junior dance team. Mrázek observed that "in 2018, I was here in the same Junior Grand Prix as a single skater, and I finished, like, fifteenth. Today I'm here with my sister, my partner. We achieved something we didn't believe in four years." In Egna, Mrázková and Mrázek improved on their previous junior world record in the rhythm dance by over a point. They won the event by a nearly fifteen-point margin over silver medalists Hannah Lim and Ye Quan of South Korea. Mrázková and Mrázek qualified to the 2022–23 Junior Grand Prix Final as the top-seeded junior dance team. They are the first Czech team to qualify for the Junior Grand Prix Final since Lucie Kadlčáková and Hynek Bílek in 2000.

A gold-medal win at the 2022 Ice Challenge preceded Mrázková and Mrázek's appearance at the Junior Grand Prix Final in Turin. They placed fourth in the rhythm dance after falling at the end of their pattern dance segment. They fell again on their rotational lift during the free dance. Despite this, they still placed third in the free dance and finished third overall. Mrázková acknowledged that they had made some mistakes. Assessing the situation afterward, they attributed the initial fall in the rhythm dance to Mrázek tripping on Mrázková's calf-length skirt, a costuming choice they had made at the start of the season. The siblings also said they were nervous to face such strong competitors, many of whom they had never met before.

Shortly after their appearance in Turin, Mrázková and Mrázek competed at the 2023 Four Nationals Championships, where they finished first first, also winning the Czech junior national title. They went on to win gold at the 2023 Egna Dance Trophy in February. At the 2023 World Junior Championships in Calgary, Mrázková and Mrázek placed first in the rhythm dance, a tango and paso doble set to "A evaristo carriego" and "España cañí", while rivals Nadiia Bashynska and Peter Beaumont of Canada finished fourth in the segment due to errors on their pattern dance segment. Mrázková also shortened the length of her skirt by about ten centimeters so as to avoid the stumble they had experienced in Turin. They also finished first in the free dance, set to music from The Man in the Iron Mask, and became the first Czech dance team to win a World Junior title. Afterward, they announced that they planned to compete the next season at the senior level.

=== 2023–24 season: Senior international debut ===
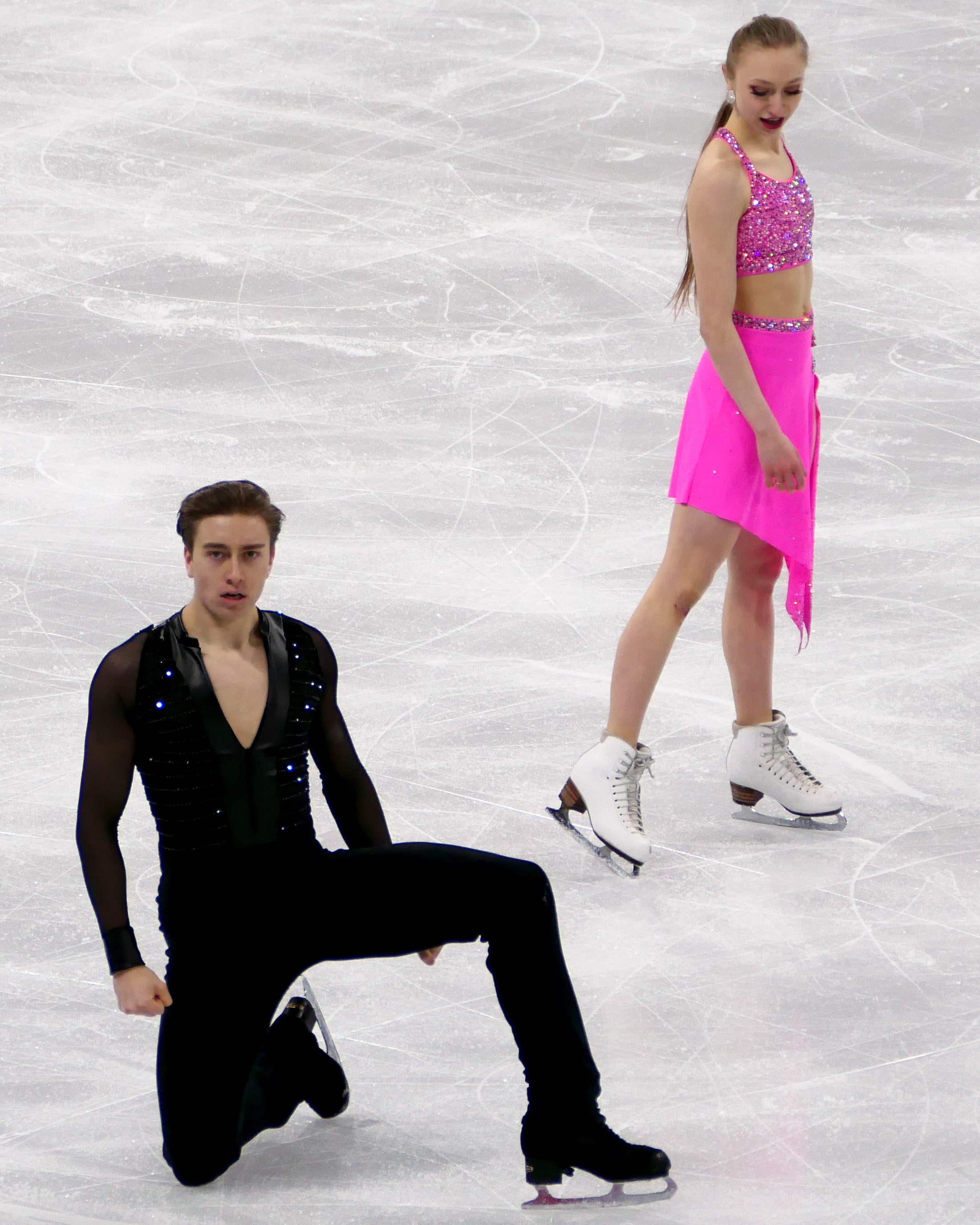
Mrázková and Mrázek performing their rhythm dance at the 2024 World Championships

For their senior debut free dance, the duo selected Tchaikovsky's Swan Lake, which Mrázek called "a big challenge for us," explaining "our goal is for the audience to feel like they are in the National Theatre." Mrázková/Mrázek made their senior debut on the Challenger circuit, coming fifth at both the 2023 CS Lombardia Trophy and 2023 CS Nebelhorn Trophy.

In what was a historic moment for the Czech Republic, Mrázková/Mrázek joined fellow Czech sibling team Taschlerová/Taschler on the Grand Prix, the first time two Czech teams competed on the circuit in the same year. They both started at the 2023 Skate America, which Taschlerová called "nice" as "we are great friends all together." Mrázková/Mrázek finished eighth at the event, which he said "wasn't our best, but not our worst performance either. Last season I was always a super-perfectionist and I wanted to give a flawless performance, which led to some mistakes. I think we have improved a little in this sense." At the 2023 Grand Prix of Espoo, the siblings placed sixth in the rhythm dance, but dropped to seventh place after Mrázková stumbled on the one-foot step sequence.

With Taschlerová/Taschler absent from the 2024 Four Nationals Championships due to the latter's injury, Mrázková/Mrázek won their first senior Czech national title by a wide margin, and finished 24 points ahead of the second-place finishers at the Four Nationals. They went on to make their European Championship debut at the 2024 edition in Kaunas, where they finished ninth in the rhythm dance. They were eleventh in the free dance after a step error by Mrázek, but remained ninth overall. With their fellow sibling team returning to competition at the event and placing seventh, it was the first time since 1980 that two Czech dance teams placed in the top ten.

Mrázková/Mrázek were assigned to make their World Championship debut at the 2024 edition in Montreal, Quebec, Canada. They placed thirteenth in the rhythm dance, while Taschlerová/Taschler, who had placed in the top ten the previous year, were eighteenth in the segment after a lift error. Mrázková/Mrázek were eleventh in the free dance with another improved personal best, but remained thirteenth overall, while their fellow Czechs moved up to fifteenth.

=== 2024–25 season ===
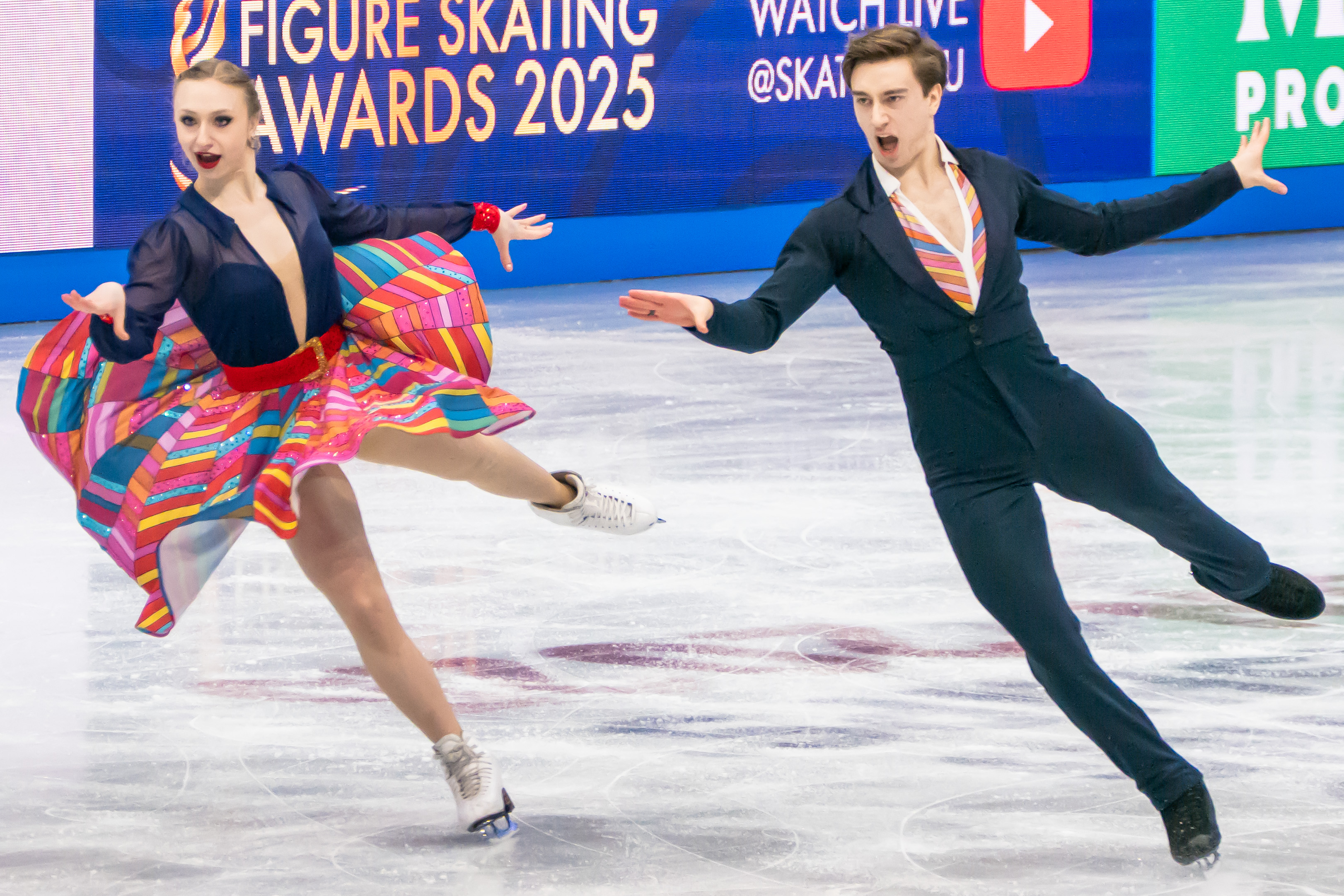
Mrázková and Mrázek during their free dance at the 2025 World Championships

Preparing their rhythm dance for the season, Mrázková/Mrázek initially wanted to use the music of Elvis Presley, but coach Matteo Zanni instead selected a medley of 1970s music. Initial assessments of the program from officials were unpromising, and Zanni eventually proposed using The Beatles. Despite the late development, Mrázek would later say that "it turned out really well, we have a lot of fun with it and I think it has great potential."

Mrázková/Mrázek began the season by competing at the 2024 CS Denis Ten Memorial Challenge, where they finished fourth. At their first 2024–25 Grand Prix assignment, they were seventh in the rhythm dance at the 2024 Skate America, before moving up to sixth place in the free dance. Mrázková said afterward that they were "not exactly thrilled" with the rhythm dance result, but were "happy" with the free dance, vowing to analyze the performance issues before their next event. However, due to Mrázek becoming ill, they had very limited training time in the subsequent period. At the 2024 Grand Prix de France, they were again seventh in the rhythm dance, but placed third in the free dance despite receiving a time violation, and came fifth overall. Following the Grand Prix the team returned to the Challenger circuit, winning the bronze medal at the 2024 CS Tallinn Trophy. They then took silver the national championships.

Following the conclusion of the fall, Mrázková and Mrázek learned that they had to change their free program music, following a dispute over compensation with The Architect composer Kerry Muzzey. They switched to "Rain, In Your Black Eyes" by Ezio Bosso. At the 2025 European Championships in Tallinn, Estonia, Mrázková/Mrázek came twelfth in the rhythm dance after Mrázek stumbled in the twizzle sequence. They remained in twelfth place after the free dance segment, where they debuted their new program.

Finishing the season at the 2025 World Championships in Boston, Massachusetts, United States, Mrázková/Mrázek came tenth in the rhythm dance. He said he was "very satisfied" that they had performed comparable to their training, and they received their highest mark of the season in the segment. They dropped to twelfth place after the free dance. Their placement, along with the thirteen-place finish for Taschlerová/Taschler, secured two berths for Czech dance teams at the 2026 Winter Olympics.

=== 2025–26 season ===
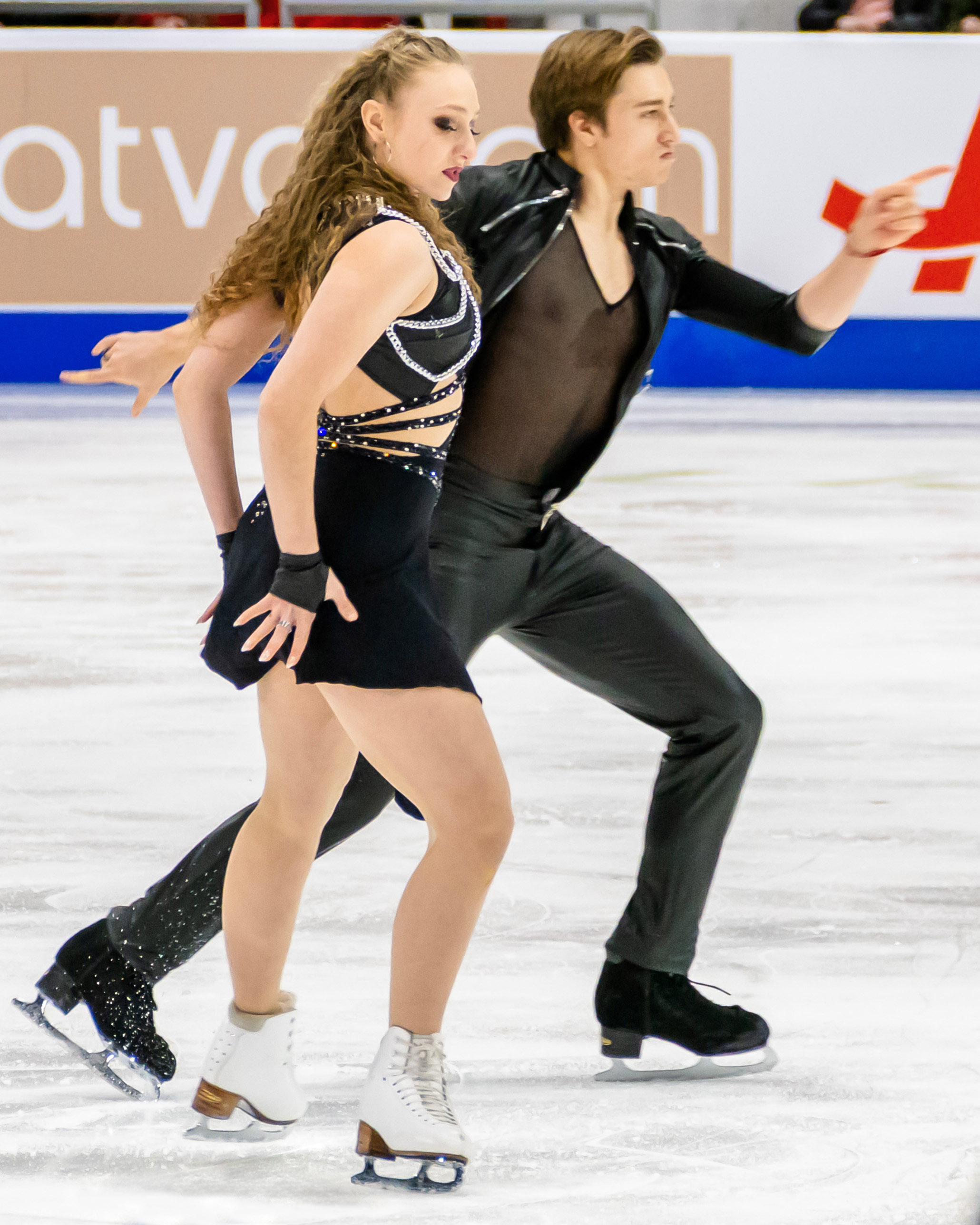
Kateřina Mrázková and Daniel Mrázek perform their rhythm dance at the 2025 Skate Canada International.

Mrázková and Mrázek began the season by winning silver at the 2025 Lombardia Trophy. They followed that up with two appearances at the 2025–26 Grand Prix series. They finished fifth at the 2025 Skate Canada International, and seventh at the 2025 Skate America after Mrázková suffered a fall during the step sequence that closed their free dance. In December, they won the bronze at the 2025 Golden Spin of Zagreb and gold at the 2026 Four Nationals Championships, which marked their second Czech national championship win. In January, Mrázková and Mrázek withdrew from the 2026 European Championships. In February, they competed at the 2026 Winter Olympics in Milan; they finished seventeenth in the rhythm dance, sixteenth in the free dance, and sixteenth overall. They finished the season at the 2026 World Figure Championships in Prague, where they finished eleventh.

=== 2026–27 season ===
Mrázková and Mrázek opened the season by winning the 2026 Lombardia Trophy.

In November, Mrázková and Mrázek placed third at 2026 Skate America, earning their first Grand Prix medal. "We are happy that we achieved that, but it's not our goal and we want to achieve more," added Mrázková. "We are overall happy that we were able to put this competition together even though we had some issues, and I think we can be proud of how we performed."

== Programs ==
=== Ice dance with Kateřina Mrázková ===
Repertoires of Kateřina Mrázková & Daniel Mrázek
Season	Rhythm dance	Free dance	Exhibition	Ref.
2021–2022	Daddy Cool By Boney M.; True By Spandau Ballet; Disco Inferno By The Trammps Choreo. by Matteo Zanni	Flor de noche; Nada puede dormir; Poeta en el viento By Vicente Amigo Choreo. by Matteo Zanni	—N/a	
2022–2023	Tango: A Evaristo Carriego By Eduardo Rovira Performed by Forever Tango; Paso doble: España cañí By Pascual Marquina Narro Performed by André Rieu Choreo. by Matteo Zanni	Surrounded; Heart of a King (from The Man in the Iron Mask) By Nick Glennie-Smith Choreo. by Matteo Zanni	Daddy Cool; True; Disco Inferno	
2023–2024	Self-Control Performed by Laura Branigan; Total Eclipse of the Heart; Holding Out for a Hero By Bonnie Tyler Choreo. by Matteo Zanni	Swan Lake By Pyotr Ilyich Tchaikovsky Choreo. by Matteo Zanni	A evaristo carriego; España cañí	
2024–2025	Love Me Do; Help!; Yellow Submarine; She Loves You By The Beatles Choreo. by Matteo Zanni, Denis Lodola & Garett Smith	Pulling a Thread; The Secret History; An Invincible Summer; The Architect; Portrait of a Courtesan By Kerry Muzzey & Andrew Skeet Choreo. by Matteo Zanni, Denis Lodola & Garett Smith	A evaristo carriego; España cañí	
2024–2025	Love Me Do; Help!; Yellow Submarine; She Loves You By The Beatles Choreo. by Matteo Zanni, Denis Lodola & Garett Smith	Rain, in Your Black Eyes By Ezio Bosso Choreo. by Matteo Zanni, Denis Lodola & Garett Smith	Mamma Mia By ABBA	
2025–2026	One Two (of 90s style Bon Jovi) By AI; Thunderstruck By AC/DC Choreo. by Matteo Zanni, Denis Lodola & Garett Smith	Malagueña By Ernesto Lecuona Choreo. by Matteo Zanni, Denis Lodola & Garett Smith	Trezor By Karel Gott	

== Competitive highlights ==
=== Ice dance with Kateřina Mrázková ===
- GP – Event of the ISU Grand Prix Series
- JGP – Event of the ISU Junior Grand Prix Series
- CS – Event of the ISU Challenger Series
- TBD – Assigned

Competition placements at senior level
Season	2023–24	2024–25	2025–26	2026-27
Winter Olympics			16th	
World Championships	13th	12th	11th	
European Championships	9th	12th		
Czech Championships (Note: The Czech Championships are contested as part of the Four Nationals Championships.)	1st	2nd	1st	
Four Nationals Championships	1st	2nd	1st	
GP Finland	7th			
GP France		5th		
GP Skate America	8th	6th	7th	TBD
GP Skate Canada			5th	
CS Denis Ten Memorial		4th		
CS Golden Spin of Zagreb			3rd	
CS Lombardia Trophy	5th		2nd	1st
CS Nebelhorn Trophy	5th			
CS Tallinn Trophy		3rd		

Competition placements at junior level
Season	2020–21	2021–22	2022–23
World Junior Championships			1st
Junior Grand Prix Final			3rd
Czech Junior Championships		2nd	1st
Four Nationals Championships		2nd	1st
JGP Czech Republic			1st
JGP France		4th	
JGP Italy			1st
JGP Slovakia		4th	
Egna Dance Trophy	6th	1st	1st
Ice Challenge		2nd	1st
Pavel Roman Memorial		1st	
Trophée Métropole Nice		1st	

=== Single skating ===
Competition placements at senior level
Season	2018–19	2019–20
Czech Championships	3rd	7th
Four Nationals Championships	4th	10th
Christmas Cup	2nd	

Competition placements at junior level
Season	2017–18	2018–19	2019–20
Winter Youth Olympics			11th
Czech Junior Championships	4th	3rd	
JGP Austria		13th	
JGP Czech Republic		15th	
Coupe du Printemps	5th		
Cup of Nice	9th		
European Youth Olympic Festival		8th	
Prague Ice Cup	1st	1st	
Santa Claus Cup	3rd		
Tirnavia Ice Cup	2nd		

== Detailed results ==
=== Ice dance with Kateřina Mrázková ===
ISU personal best scores in the +5/-5 GOE System
Segment	Type	Score	Event
Total	TSS	190.17	2026 World Championships
Short program	TSS	77.29	2025 CS Golden Spin of Zagreb
Short program	TES	43.74	2026 World Championships
Short program	PCS	33.85	2025 CS Golden Spin of Zagreb
Free skating	TSS	115.23	2024 World Championships
Free skating	TES	65.39	2024 World Championships
Free skating	PCS	51.40	2025 CS Lombardia Trophy

- Small medals for the short program and free skate are only awarded at ISU Championships.

==== Senior level ====
Results in the 2023–24 season
Date	Event	RD		FD		Total	
Date	Event	P	Score	P	Score	P	Score
8–10 Sep 2023	(Italy) 2023 CS Lombardia Trophy	6	67.31	3	110.12	5	177.43
20–23 Sep 2023	(Germany) 2023 CS Nebelhorn Trophy	5	67.83	5	109.75	5	177.38
20–22 Oct 2023	(United States) 2023 Skate America	8	67.95	9	102.89	8	170.84
17–19 Nov 2023	(Finland) 2023 Grand Prix of Espoo	6	70.59	7	101.99	7	172.58
14–16 Dec 2023	(Czech Republic) 2024 Four Nationals Championships	1	74.86	1	115.91	1	190.77
14–16 Dec 2023	(Czech Republic) 2024 Czech Championships	1	—N/a	1	—N/a	1	—N/a
10–14 Jan 2024	(Lithuania) 2024 European Championships	9	75.19	11	107.14	9	182.33
18–20 Mar 2024	(Canada) 2024 World Championships	13	73.05	11	115.23	13	188.28

Results in the 2024–25 season
Date	Event	RD		FD		Total	
Date	Event	P	Score	P	Score	P	Score
3–6 Oct 2024	(Kazakhstan) 2024 CS Denis Ten Memorial Challenge	4	72.28	5	108.47	4	180.75
18–20 Oct 2024	(United States) 2024 Skate America	7	70.09	6	109.25	6	179.34
1–3 Nov 2024	2024 Grand Prix de France	7	71.54	3	111.51	5	183.05
12–17 Nov 2024	(Estonia) 2024 CS Tallinn Trophy	3	75.15	3	113.69	3	185.05
13–14 Dec 2024	(Poland) 2025 Four Nationals Championships	4	66.05	2	112.74	2	178.79
13–14 Dec 2024	(Czech Republic) 2025 Czech Championships	2	—N/a	2	—N/a	2	—N/a
28 Jan – 2 Feb 2025	(Estonia) 2025 European Championships	12	70.26	12	111.41	12	181.67
26–30 Mar 2025	(United States) 2025 World Championships	10	74.49	12	112.68	12	187.17

Results in the 2025–26 season
Date	Event	RD		FD		Total	
Date	Event	P	Score	P	Score	P	Score
11–14 Sep 2025	(Italy) 2025 Lombardia Trophy	1	74.66	3	107.29	2	181.95
31 Oct – 2 Nov 2025	2025 Skate Canada International	5	74.29	8	106.90	5	181.19
14–16 Nov 2025	(United States) 2025 Skate America	6	72.73	8	103.31	7	176.04
3–6 Dec 2025	(Croatia) 2025 Golden Spin of Zagreb	2	77.29	4	106.89	3	184.18
11–13 Dec 2025	(Slovakia) 2026 Four Nationals Championships	1	78.86	1	117.84	1	196.70
11–13 Dec 2025	(Czech Republic) 2026 Czech Championships	1	—N/a	1	—N/a	1	—N/a
9–11 Feb 2026	(Italy) 2026 Winter Olympics	17	72.09	16	109.35	16	181.44
24–29 Mar 2026	(Czech Republic) 2026 World Championships	12	76.74	12	113.43	11	190.17

Results in the 2026–27 season
Date	Event	RD		FD		Total	
Date	Event	P	Score	P	Score	P	Score
17–20 Sep 2026	(Italy) 2026 CS Lombardia Trophy	2	75.75	1	112.86	1	188.61

==== Junior level ====
Results in the 2020–21 season
Date	Event	RD		FD		Total	
Date	Event	P	Score	P	Score	P	Score
6–7 Feb 2021	(Italy) 2021 Egna Dance Trophy	9	45.45	4	77.94	6	123.39

Results in the 2021–22 season
Date	Event	RD		FD		Total	
Date	Event	P	Score	P	Score	P	Score
18–21 Aug 2021	2021 JGP France I	3	57.04	4	83.89	4	140.93
1–4 Sep 2021	2021 JGP Slovakia	5	59.18	4	91.38	4	150.56
20–24 Oct 2021	(France) 2021 Cup of Nice	1	58.68	1	91.06	1	149.74
5–7 Nov 2021	(Czech Republic) 2021 Pavel Roman Memorial	1	62.55	1	92.78	1	155.33
10–14 Nov 2021	(Austria) 2021 Ice Challenge	1	61.06	2	89.97	2	151.03
16–18 Dec 2021	(Slovakia) 2022 Four Nationals Championships	3	52.20	2	92.20	2	144.40
16–18 Dec 2021	(Czech Republic) 2022 Czech Junior Championships	2	—N/a	2	—N/a	2	—N/a
4–6 Feb 2022	(Italy) 2022 Egna Dance Trophy	1	67.54	1	99.52	1	167.06

Results in the 2022–23 season
Date	Event	RD		FD		Total	
Date	Event	P	Score	P	Score	P	Score
31 Aug – 3 Sep 2022	2022 JGP Czech Republic	1	70.83	1	105.43	1	176.26
12–15 Oct 2022	2022 JGP Italy	1	71.87	1	101.13	1	173.00
9–13 Nov 2022	(Austria) 2022 Ice Challenge	1	72.48	1	98.99	1	171.47
8–11 Dec 2022	(Italy) 2022–23 Junior Grand Prix Final	4	64.08	3	97.46	3	161.54
15–17 Dec 2022	(Hungary) 2023 Four Nationals Championships	1	69.89	1	103.20	1	173.09
15–17 Dec 2022	(Czech Republic) 2023 Czech Junior Championships	1	—N/a	1	—N/a	1	—N/a
9–12 Feb 2023	(Italy) 2023 Egna Dance Trophy	1	76.22	1	111.06	1	187.28
27 Feb – 5 Mar 2023	(Canada) 2023 World Junior Championships	1	71.19	1	106.17	1	177.36

=== Single skating ===
==== Junior level ====
Results in the 2017–18 season
Date	Event	SP		FS		Total	
Date	Event	P	Score	P	Score	P	Score
11–15 Oct 2017	(France) 2017 International Cup of Nice	10	46.46	8	93.27	9	139.73
2–5 Nov 2017	(Slovakia) 2017 Tirnavia Ice Cup	2	57.48	2	93.21	2	150.69
10–12 Nov 2017	(Czech Republic) 2017 Prague Ice Cup	2	38.04	1	100.84	1	138.88
4–10 Dec 2017	(Hungary) 2017 Santa Claus Cup	3	48.98	3	109.40	3	158.38
9–10 Feb 2018	(Czech Republic) 2018 Czech Junior Championships	4	52.07	4	108.18	4	160.25
16–18 Mar 2018	(Luxembourg) 2018 Coupe du Printemps	8	49.93	5	96.21	5	146.14

Results in the 2018–19 season
Date	Event	SP		FS		Total	
Date	Event	P	Score	P	Score	P	Score
29 Aug – 1 Sep 2018	2018 JGP Austria	13	50.91	13	92.70	13	143.61
26–29 Sep 2018	2018 JGP Czech Republic	13	49.25	16	77.64	15	126.89
9–11 Nov 2018	(Czech Republic) 2018 Prague Ice Cup	1	57.07	1	97.71	1	154.78
29 Nov – 2 Dec 2018	(Hungary) 2018 Christmas Cup (Senior)	3	52.35	2	113.33	2	165.68
14–15 Dec 2018	(Hungary) 2019 Four Nationals Championships (Senior)	7	58.59	2	115.04	4	173.63
14–15 Dec 2018	(Czech Republic) 2019 Czech Championships	4	—N/a	2	—N/a	3	—N/a
1–3 Feb 2019	(Czech Republic) 2019 Czech Junior Championships	2	54.80	3	93.86	3	148.66
13–14 Feb 2019	(Bosnia and Herzegovina) 2019 European Youth Olympic Winter Festival	12	44.11	6	99.85	8	143.96

Results in the 2019–20 season
Date	Event	SP		FS		Total	
Date	Event	P	Score	P	Score	P	Score
13–14 Dec 2019	(Czech Republic) 2020 Four Nationals Championships (Senior)	9	55.77	11	99.09	10	154.86
13–14 Dec 2019	(Czech Republic) 2020 Czech Championships (Senior)	7	—N/a	7	—N/a	7	—N/a
10–15 Jan 2020	(Switzerland) 2020 Winter Youth Olympics	8	60.66	13	96.32	11	156.98
