= Barbora Řezníčková =

Czech-Austrian former ice dancer (born 1989)

Barbora Řezníčková (Silná)
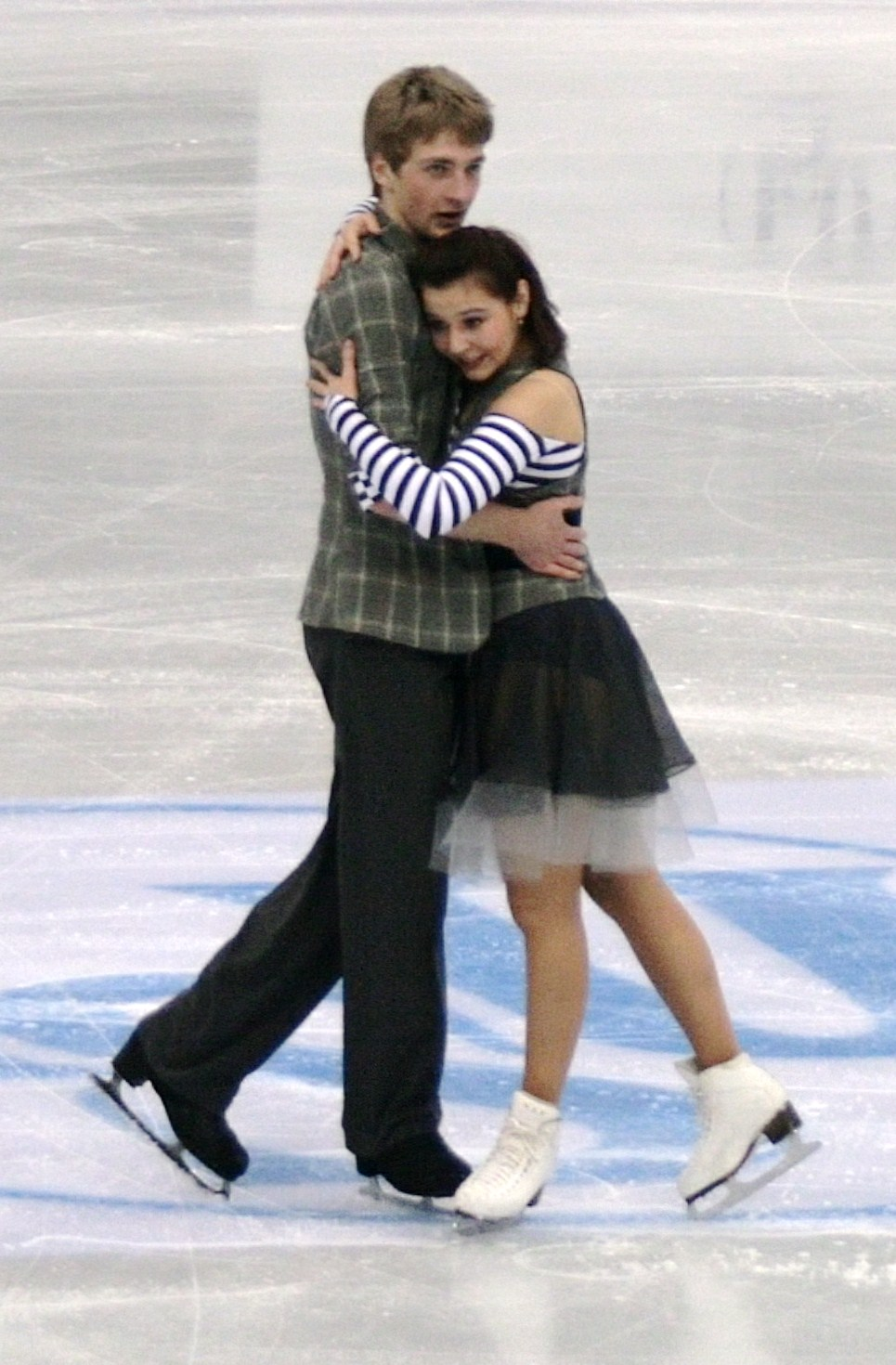
- Silná/Kurakin in 2012.

Personal information
- Other names: Barbora Silná
- Born: 8 January 1989 (age 37) Kroměříž, Czechoslovakia
- Height: 1.67 m (5 ft 6 in)

Figure skating career
- Country: Austria
- Partner: Juri Kurakin
- Skating club: EKE Vienna; Grazer Eislaufverein; TJ Stadion Brno
- Began skating: 1993
- Retired: August 3, 2016

Barbora Řezníčková, née Silná (born 8 January 1989) is a Czech-Austrian ice dancing coach and former competitor who represented Austria for most of her career. With Dmitri Matsjuk, she is a four-time Austrian national champion and qualified for the free dance at four ISU Championships. With Juri Kurakin, she won three Austrian national titles and reached the final segment at three ISU Championships.

== Personal life ==
Řezníčková was born 8 January 1989 in Kroměříž, Czechoslovakia. She became an Austrian citizen by January 2009.

== Career ==
=== In the Czech Republic ===
Řezníčková began learning to skate in 1993. Early in her career, she represented the Czech Republic with Martin Šubrt. In the 2003–04 season, the duo appeared at two ISU Junior Grand Prix events and became the Czech national junior bronze medalists. They were coached by Natalia Vorobieva at TJ Stadion in Brno.

=== Partnership with Matsjuk ===
In 2005, Řezníčková teamed up with Ukrainian-born skater Dmitri Matsjuk to compete on the senior level for Austria. The two won four Austrian national titles from 2006 to 2009 and the silver medal at the 2007 Ondrej Nepela Memorial. They qualified for the free dance at four ISU Championships – 2007 Europeans in Warsaw, Poland; 2008 Europeans in Zagreb, Croatia; 2008 Worlds in Gothenburg, Sweden; and 2009 Europeans in Helsinki, Finland. Their best result, 15th, came in Helsinki. They trained under Jana Hübler at Cottage Engelmann Club in Vienna and in Lyon.

=== Partnership with Kurakin ===
Řezníčková teamed up with Estonian skater Juri Kurakin in 2010. The two decided to represent Austria. In the 2010–11 season, they were coached by Dmitri Sildoja and Vitali Schulz in Dortmund and Vienna. The following season, training under Muriel Zazoui and Romain Haguenauer in Lyon and Graz, they won their first Austrian national title. During the next two seasons, they finished second to Kira Geil / Tobias Eisenbauer at the Austrian Championships. In the 2013–14 season, they switched to Barbara Fusar-Poli in Milan.

Having missed qualifying for the free dance at three ISU Championship, Řezníčková/Kurakin were successful for the first time at the 2015 Europeans in Stockholm, where they finished 18th. At the 2015 Worlds in Shanghai, they ranked 21st in the short and did not advance further.

Stefano Caruso joined Fusar-Poli as the duo's coach in the 2015–16 season. Řezníčková/Kurakin reached the final segment at the 2016 Europeans in Bratislava and at the 2016 Worlds in Boston, where they placed 17th and 20th, respectively. They announced their retirement on 3 August 2016 due to Řezníčková's back problems.

=== Post-competitive career ===
In 2020, Řezníčková began coaching at the Young Goose Academy in Egna, Italy alongside Matteo Zanni.

Her current students include:

- (Poland) Olexandra Borysova / Aaron Freeman
- (Germany) Darya Grimm / Grigorii Rodin
- (Georgia (country)) Maria Kazakova / Vladislav Kasinskij
- (Cyprus) Angelina Kudryavtseva / Ilia Karankevich
- (Czech Republic) Kateřina Mrázková / Daniel Mrázek
- (Slovakia) Anna Šimová / Kirill Aksenov
- (Ukraine) Myroslava Tkachenko / Riccardo Pesca
- (Slovakia) Aneta Václavíková / Ivan Morozov

Her former students include:

- (Germany) Darya Grimm / Michail Savitskiy
- (Georgia (country)) Maria Kazakova / Georgy Reviya
- (Italy) Elisabetta Leccardi / Mattia Dalla Torre
- (Czech Republic) Natálie Taschlerová / Filip Taschler

== Programs ==
=== With Kurakin ===
Season	Short dance	Free dance
2015–16	Waltz & Polka: Die Fledermaus by Johann Strauss II	Lawrence of Arabia by Maurice Jarre
2014–15	Paso doble: España cañí by Pascual Marquina Narro	Sorry Seems to Be the Hardest Word; Funeral for a Friend Love Lies Bleeding by Elton John
2013–14	Slow foxtrot: Just One Dance; Quickstep: That Man by Caro Emerald	Lost Generation (from "Chronicles"); Cerebral Beauty by Audiomachine
2011–12	Rhumba: Ain't No Sunshine by Bill Withers performed by Will Young; Cha cha: Perhaps, Perhaps, Perhaps performed by The Pussycat Dolls	Amélie by Yann Tiersen
2010–11	Waltz: La Valse d'Amélie (from Amélie) by Yann Tiersen; Quickstep: Jumping Jack by Big Bad Voodoo Daddy	Ritornare (from Corteo)

=== With Matsjuk ===
Season	Original dance	Free dance
2008–09	Swing: Sing, Sing, Sing by Louis Prima	I'd Do Anything for Love by Jim Steinman performed by Meat Loaf
2007–08	Austrian folk dance: Kuckucks Jodler Polka	Saturday Night Fever by the Bee Gees, Adam Garcia
2006–07	Maria De Buenos Aires by Astor Piazzolla	Saturday Night Fever by the Bee Gees, Adam Garcia

=== With Šubrt ===
Season	Original dance	Free dance
2003–04	Blues; Jive	Romantic Waltz (from The Band Wagon)

== Competitive highlights ==
GP: Grand Prix; CS: Challenger Series; JGP: Junior Grand Prix

=== With Kurakin for Austria ===
International
Event	10–11	11–12	12–13	13–14	14–15	15–16
Worlds		36th			21st	20th
Europeans		24th		25th	18th	17th
CS DS Cup						5th
CS Finlandia Trophy						9th
CS Ice Challenge				8th	3rd	4th
CS Nepela Trophy		7th			5th	
Cup of Nice		11th				
Ice Challenge		5th				
Mont Blanc	8th					
Nebelhorn Trophy	16th					
NRW Trophy						2nd
Pavel Roman		8th			1st	
Trophy of Lyon	5th	2nd				
National
Austrian Champ.	2nd	1st	2nd	2nd	1st	1st

=== With Matsjuk for Austria ===
International
Event	05–06	06–07	07–08	08–09
Worlds		25th	21st	
Europeans		19th	16th	15th
GP Trophée Bompard			8th	
Nebelhorn Trophy	13th	10th	8th	
Nepela Memorial			2nd	
Schäfer Memorial	14th	5th		WD
National
Austrian Champ.	1st	1st	1st	1st
WD: Withdrew

=== With Šubrt for the Czech Republic ===
International
Event	2003–04
JGP Czech Republic	12th
JGP Slovakia	9th
Pavel Roman Memorial	1st J
National
Czech Championships	3rd J
J: Junior level
