= Matteo Zanni =

Italian ice dancer

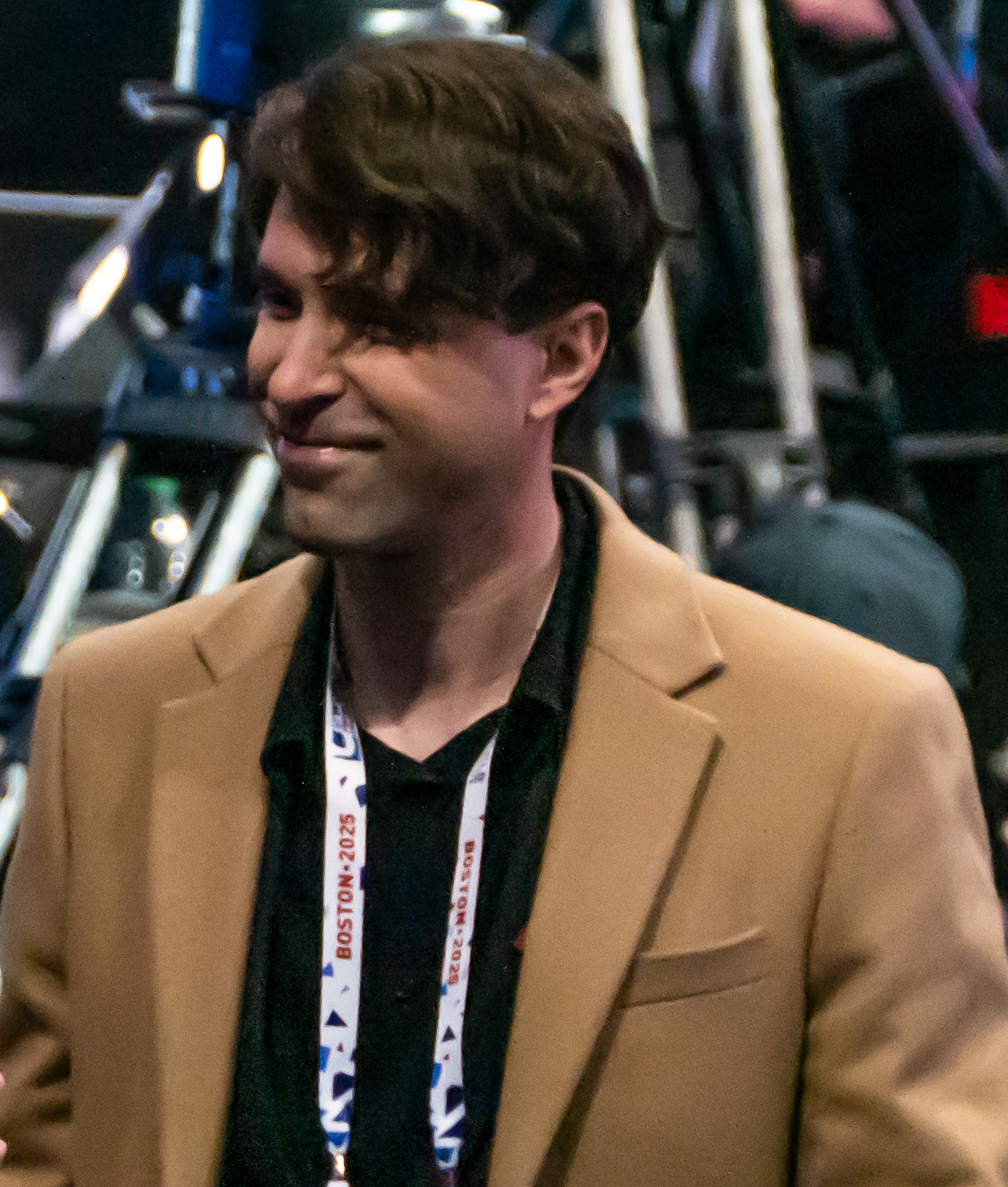
- Zanni at the 2025 World Championships

Personal information
- Born: 17 February 1987 (age 39) Milan, Italy
- Height: 1.85 m (6 ft 1 in)

Figure skating career
- Country: Italy
- Partner: Natalia Mitiushina (2007–08); Camilla Pistorello (2006–07); Anna Cappellini (2001–05)
- Coach: Paola Mezzadri; Barbara Fusar-Poli; Alessandro Tormenai
- Skating club: Ice Academy

Matteo Zanni (born 17 February 1987) is an Italian ice dancing coach and former competitor. With Anna Cappellini, he won four medals on the ISU Junior Grand Prix series (two gold) and bronze at the 2004 JGP Final.

== Competitive career ==
Zanni competed with partner Anna Cappellini from 2001 through 2005. They won the bronze medal at the 2004 Junior Grand Prix final and then placed fifth at the World Junior Championships. In the 2006-07 season, he competed with Camilla Pistorello. They were the 2007 Italian junior national champions. In the 2007-08 season, he competed with Natalia Mityushina. Their partnership ended following that season.

Zanni joined Holiday On Ice and performed as part of the Mystery Tour in South America. In 2011, he coached Olympic champion swimmer Inge de Bruijn during the 4th edition of the Dutch television series Sterren Dansen Op Het IJs and skated with the singer Shaya in Dancing on Ice Greece. He interviewed the Italian rockstar Patty Pravo (Nicoletta Strambelli) in late 2011. In 2013, he joined Feld Entertainment Group to tour the US East Coast and then retired from performing.

== Coaching career ==
In 2013, Zanni began coaching alongside his former coach, Barbara Fusar-Poli, in Milan. Three years later, he became an ISU Technical Specialist.

In 2020, Zanni opened his own ice dance skating school in Egna at the Young Goose Academy, where he currently coaches alongside Barbora Řezníčková, Denis Lodola, and Katharina Müller.

His current students include:

- (Poland) Olexandra Borysova / Aaron Freeman
- (Germany) Darya Grimm / Grigorii Rodin
- (Georgia (country)) Maria Kazakova / Vladislav Kasinskij
- (Cyprus) Angelina Kudryavtseva / Ilia Karankevich
- (Czech Republic) Kateřina Mrázková / Daniel Mrázek
- (Ukraine) Mariia Pinchuk / Mykyta Pogorielov
- (Slovakia) Anna Šimová / Kirill Aksenov
- (Ukraine) Myroslava Tkachenko / Riccardo Pesca
- (Slovakia) Aneta Václavíková / Ivan Morozov

His former students include:

- (Bulgaria) Yana Bozhilova / Kaloyan Georgiev
- (Italy) Chiara Calderone / Pietro Papetti
- (Italy) Sara Campanini / Francesco Riva
- (Germany) Darya Grimm / Michail Savitskiy
- (Netherlands) Hanna Jakucs / Alessio Galli
- (Georgia (country)) Maria Kazakova / Georgy Reviya
- (Italy) Elisabetta Leccardi / Mattia Dalla Torre
- (Italy) Giada Russo / Jaime Garcia
- (Czech Republic) Natálie Taschlerová / Filip Taschler

Additionally, Zanni has also choreographed competitive figure skating programs since his retirement. His clients have included:

- (Italy) Sara Conti / Niccolò Macii
- (Italy) Sarina Joos
- (United Kingdom) Layla Karnes / Kenan Slevira
- (Italy) Elisabetta Leccardi
- (Germany) Viktoriia Lopusova / Asaf Kazimov
- (Germany) Katharina Müller / Tim Dieck

In October 2026, his former student Filip Taschler alleged that Zanni had been mentally abusive and controlling of their daily lives, such as who they spoke to and whether they were allowed to date or cut their hair.

== Personal life ==
In his early years, he studied Classical Guitar and Composition. On 18 February 2013, Zanni became a doctor in International Relations at Università Cattolica del Sacro Cuore. He enjoys photography.

== Competitive highlights ==
=== With Mitiushina ===
International
Event	2007–08
World Junior Championships	15th
National
Italian Championships	2nd J.
J. = Junior level

=== With Pistorello ===
International
Event	2006–07
World Junior Championships	8th
JGP Hungary	5th
JGP Norway	4th
National
Italian Championships	1st J.
JGP = Junior Grand Prix; J. = Junior level

=== With Cappellini ===
International
Event	2001–02	2002–03	2003–04	2004–05
World Junior Champ.		20th	5th	WD
JGP Final				3rd
JGP Germany		6th		
JGP Hungary				1st
JGP Italy		11th		
JGP Mexico			3rd	
JGP Serbia				1st
JGP Slovenia			3rd	
EYOF		7th		
National
Italian Champ.	2nd J.	2nd J.		1st J.
J. = Junior level; JGP = Junior Grand Prix; WD = Withdrew

== Skating programs ==
=== With Mitiushina ===
Season	Original dance	Free dance
2007–2008	Russian gypsy dance: Orvel (soundtrack)	1492: Conquest of Paradise by Vangelis; Twenty Eighth Parallel (from 1492: Conquest of Paradise)

=== With Pistorello ===
Season	Original dance	Free dance
2006–2007	La cumparsita; Oblivion by Astor Piazzolla; El Choclo	Prayer in the Night; Sarabande in D minor by George Frideric Handel; Sarabande (modern arrangement) by Maksim Mrvica

=== With Cappellini ===
Season	Original dance	Free dance
2004–2005	Let's Face the Music and Dance by Nat King Cole; Night and Day by Ella Fitzgerald; Peroxide Swing by Michael Bublé	Wake Up by Fats Waller; La Vie En Rose by Louis Armstrong; Entr' Act by Fats Waller
2003–2004	Jive: Hit the Road Jack; Blues: Why Don't You Do Right? (from Who Framed Roger Rabbit); Jive	Come Antes, Come Nunca, Come Siempre; Poeta en el Viento by Vicente Amigo
2002–2003	Waltz and Galop: Overture from Die Fledermaus by Johann Strauss II	Moonlight Sonata by Ludwig van Beethoven; Rhapsody on a Theme of Paganini by Sergei Rachmaninoff
