= Ilia Karankevich =

Russian-Cypriot ice dancer (born 2004)

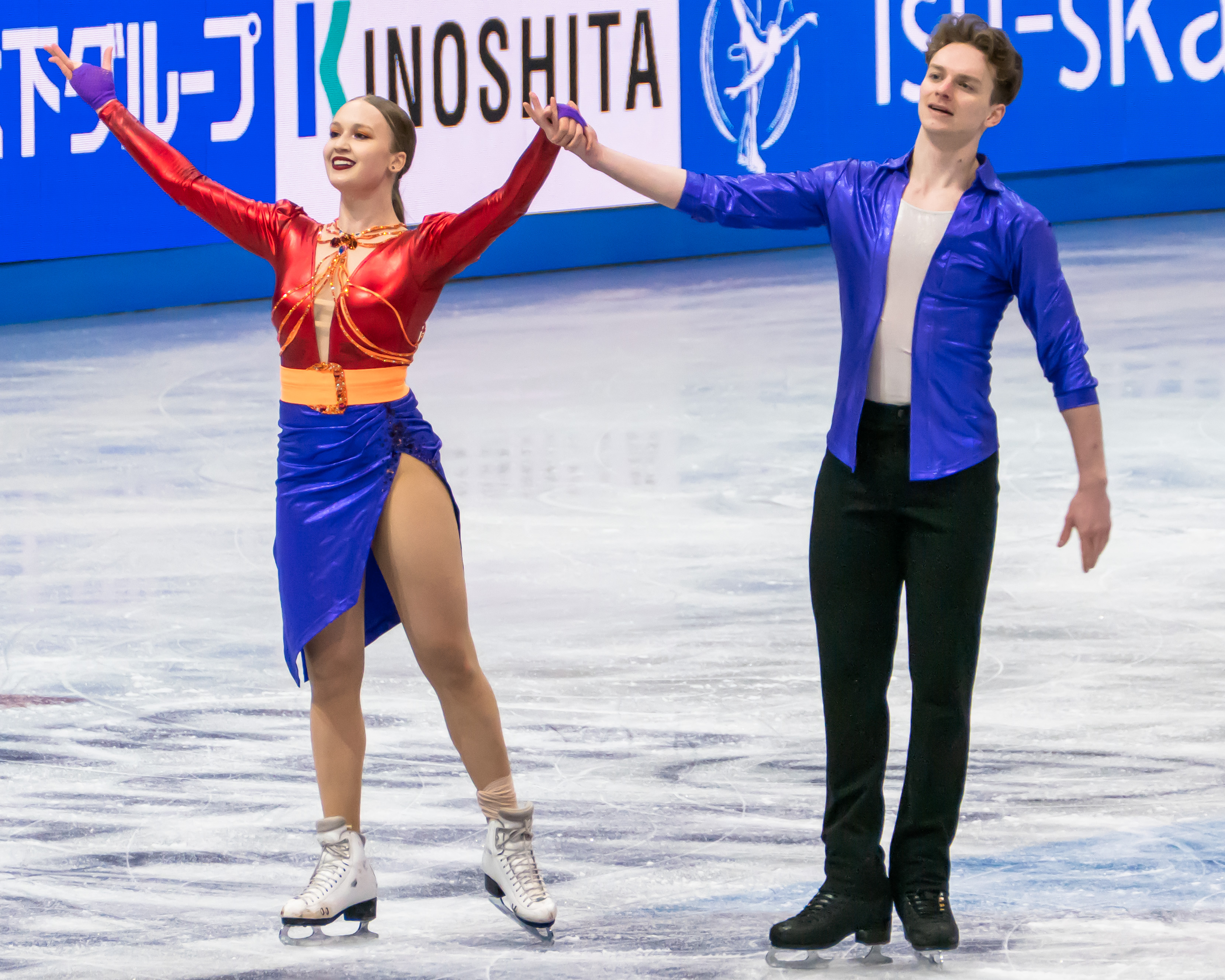
- Kudryavtseva and Karankevich at the 2025 World Championships

Personal information
- Native name: Илья Денисович Каранкевич
- Full name: Ilia Denisovich Karankevich
- Other names: Ilya
- Born: 8 January 2004 (age 22) Tiumen, Russia
- Home town: Paphos, Cyprus
- Height: 1.80 m (5 ft 11 in)

Figure skating career
- Country: Cyprus
- Partner: Angelina Kudryavtseva
- Coach: Matteo Zanni; Barbora Reznickova; Katharina Müller; Mattia Dalla Torre; Francesco Corazza
- Skating club: Young Goose Academy, Leader FSC Cyprus
- Began skating: 2010

Ilia Denisovich Karankevich (Russian: Илья Денисович Каранкевич, Greek: Ηλία Καράνεβιτς, born 8 January 2004) is a Russian-born ice dancer who competes for Cyprus. With his skating partner, Angelina Kudryavtseva, he is the 2023 Cypriot national champion and the 2025 Bosphorus Cup champion. Kudryavtseva/Karankevich are the first ice dance team to represent Cyprus at the European and World Championships.

On the junior level, he is the 2021 JGP Poland bronze medalist and competed in the free dance at two World Junior Championships. Kudryavtseva/Karankevich are the first skaters representing Cyprus, junior or senior, to win a medal at an ISU Grand Prix event.

== Personal life ==
Karankevich was born on January 8, 2004, in Tiumen, Russia.

== Career ==
=== Early years ===
Karankevich trained as a single skater for Russia through the 2014–15 season and was coached by Natalya Aminova. He transitioned to ice dance, teamed with current partner Angelina Kudryavtseva for Cyprus, during the 2018–19 season.

Coached by Alexei Sitnikov and Julia Zlobina in Moscow, the pair won gold at the 2018 Open d'Andorra, at the 2018 Mentor Toruń Cup, and at the 2019 Open Ice Mall Cup on the advanced novice level.

=== 2019–20 season: Junior international debut ===
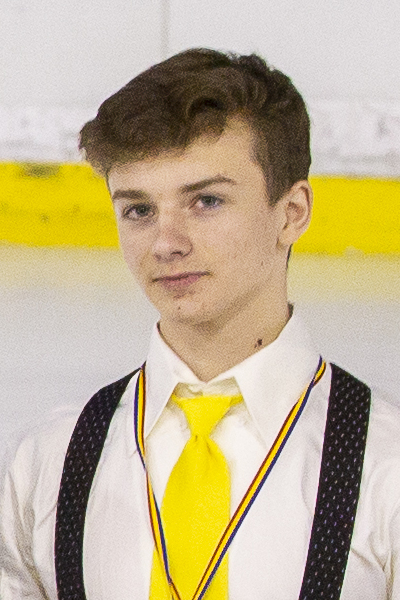
Karankevich at the 2019 Open d'Andorra

Kudryavtseva/Karankevich made their junior international debut in August 2019 at the NRW Trophy where they placed fifth in the junior division. From there, the team received two Junior Grand Prix assignments, and at the 2019 JGP France and 2019 JGP Latvia they finished fourteenth and tenth, respectively. They competed six more times internationally in the lead up to the 2020 World Junior Championships, including taking the junior title at the 2019 Open d'Andorra and earning the junior silver medal at 2019 Grand Prix of Bratislava. At Junior Worlds in March, they placed eighteenth in the rhythm dance, which qualified them to advance in the competition. In the free dance, the team dropped to twentieth place in the segment and overall.

=== 2020–21 season ===
Due to the COVID-19 pandemic, Kudryavtseva/Karankevich only had the opportunity to compete twice internationally during the 2020–21 season. They took the junior ice dance titles at the 2020 Ice Star in October 2020 and the 2021 LuMi Dance Trophy in February 2021.

=== 2021–22 season: Junior Grand Prix bronze ===
Kudryavtseva/Karankevich opened their third junior season at the 2021 JGP Slovakia in Košice. They set a new personal best to place fourth in the rhythm dance, but later dropped to seventh in the free dance and seventh overall. At their second JGP assignment, 2021 JGP Poland, Kudryavtseva/Karankevich placed fourth in the rhythm dance, scoring just shy of their personal best, but advanced onto the podium by scoring a new personal best in the free dance to place third in that segment and third overall. Their bronze medal was the first medal for Cyprus in ice dance on the Junior Grand Prix circuit.

Due to the pandemic, the 2022 World Junior Championships could not be held as scheduled in Sofia in early March, and as a result were rescheduled for Tallinn in mid-April. Due to Vladimir Putin's invasion of Ukraine, the International Skating Union banned all Russian and Belarusian athletes from participating, which had a significant impact on the dance field. Kudryavtseva/Karankevich placed fifth in the rhythm dance with a new personal best score of 62.15. They were eighth in the free dance, dropping to eighth overall.

Following the season, Kudryavtseva/Karankevich relocated from Moscow, Russia to Egna, Italy where Matteo Zanni, Barbora Řezníčková, and Denis Lodola became their new coaches.

=== 2022–23 season ===
Returning to the Junior Grand Prix, Kudryavtseva/Karankevich came fifth at the 2022 JGP Poland and seventh at the 2022 JGP Italy. They later won gold at both the Bosphorus Cup and the Pavel Roman Memorial.

Kudryavtseva/Karankevich finished the season with a tenth-place finish at the 2023 World Junior Championships.

=== 2023–24 season: Injury & return to competition ===
During their first Junior Grand Prix assignment at the 2023 JGP Austria, Kudryavtseva/Karankevich collided with another team during practice, leading to Kudryavtseva breaking two bones. Subsequently, Kudryavtseva/Karankevich withdrew from both of their Junior Grand Prix assignments.

Kudryavtseva/Karankevich competed in their first competition of the season at the 2024 World Junior Championships, where they placed eleventh.

=== 2024–25 season: Senior debut ===
Kudryavtseva/Karankevich started their season by competing on the 2024–25 Challenger Series, finishing twelfth at the 2024 CS Nebelhorn Trophy and eighth at the 2024 CS Golden Spin of Zagreb. Between the two events, the duo would also place seventh at the 2024 Santa Claus Cup.

In January, Kudryavtseva/Karankevich placed sixth at the 2025 Sofia Trophy. Two weeks later, they made their Senior Championship debut at the 2025 European Championships in Tallinn, Estonia. They placed twenty-first in the rhythm dance and did not advance to the free dance segment. They followed up this result with a sixth-place finish at the 2025 Egna Dance Trophy.

They closed the season by finishing thirty-sixth at the 2025 World Championships in Boston, Massachusetts, United States.

=== 2025–26 season ===
Kudryavtseva/Karankevich opened their season with an eleventh-place finish at the ISU Skate to Milano. They then went on to finish tenth at the 2025 CS Trialeti Trophy and sixth at the 2025 Mezzaluna Cup. In late November, Kudryavtseva/Karankevich won their first senior international medal, a gold, at the 2025 Bosphorus Cup. One week later, they placed seventh at the 2025 CS Golden Spin of Zagreb.

In January, Kudryavtseva/Karankevich finished twenty-second at the 2026 European Championships in Sheffield, England, United Kingdom.

== Programs ==
=== Ice dance with Angelina Kudryavtseva ===
Season	Rhythm dance	Free dance
2025–2026	Larger Than Life; Everybody (Backstreet's Back); Larger Than Life by Backstreet Boys choreo. by Matteo Zanni, Evgenia Kozhukhanova, Marco Pipani, Matteo Dal Pra	Autumn Leaves by Joseph Kosma performed by Seal; Autumn Leaves (Remastered) arranged by Maxime Rodriguez & Ludivine Amado choreo. by Matteo Zanni, Evgenia Kozhukhanova, Marco Pipani, Matteo Dal Pra
2024–2025	Knock on Wood by Eddie Floyd performed by Amii Stewart; Tragedy (Moreno J Remix); Tragedy by Bee Gees choreo. by Matteo Zanni, Marco Pipani, Angus Simpson	The Imaginarium of Doctor Parnassus by Mychael Danna & Jeff Danna; Reminiscence by Florian Christl choreo. by Matteo Zanni, Marco Pipani, Angus Simpson
2023–2024	Like a Prayer; Spanish Eyes; Material Girl Madonna choreo. by Matteo Zanni, Marco Pipani, Fabio Bollue	Le notti di Cabiria by Nino Rota choreo. by Matteo Zanni, Marco Pipani, Fabio Bollue
2022–2023	Tango: La cumparsita (Questo Tango) by Gerardo Matos Rodriguez performed by Milva; Flamenco: El Fuego by Sean Peter, feat. Oscar Jimenez	It's Tricky by Run-DMC; How Deep Is Your Love by the Bee Gees; Get Ready For This by 2 Unlimited
2021–2022	Ruby Blue by Róisín Murphy and Jule Styne choreo. by Dmitri Ionov, Maxim Chebotarev	Nuvole bianche by Ludovico Einaudi choreo. by Artem Khromih
2020–2021	Quickstep: You Gotta Get a Gimmick; Foxtrot: Seattle to Los Angeles (from Gypsy) by Stephen Sondheim and Jule Styne choreo. by Dmitri Ionov	Nuvole bianche by Ludovico Einaudi choreo. by Artem Khromih
2019–2020	Quickstep: You Gotta Get a Gimmick; Foxtrot: Seattle to Los Angeles (from Gypsy) by Stephen Sondheim and Jule Styne choreo. by Dmitri Ionov	Ça déroule; Droite de cité; Diabolique by Raphael Beau choreo. by Dmitri Ionov

== Competitive highlights ==
- JGP – Event of the ISU Junior Grand Prix Series
- CS – Event of the ISU Challenger Series
- TBD – Assigned
- C – Event was cancelled

=== Ice dance Angelina Kudryavtseva ===
Competition placements at senior level
Season	2022–23	2024–25	2025–26
World Championships		36th	25th
European Championships		21st	22nd
Cyprus Championships	1st		
CS Golden Spin of Zagreb		8th	7th
CS Nebelhorn Trophy		12th	
CS Trialeti Trophy			10th
Bosphorus Cup			1st
Egna Dance Trophy		5th	
Mezzaluna Cup			6th
Santa Claus Cup		7th	
Skate to Milano			11th
Sofia Trophy		6th	

Competition placements at junior level
Season	2019–20	2020–21	2021–22	2022–23	2023–24
World Junior Championships	20th	C	8th	10th	11th
JGP France	14th				
JGP Italy				7th	
JGP Latvia	10th				
JGP Poland			3rd	5th	
JGP Slovakia			7th		
Bavarian Open	8th		1st		
Bosphorus Cup				1st	
Golden Spin of Zagreb	5th				
Grand Prix of Bratislava	2nd				
Ice Star	8th	1st			
LuMi Dance Trophy		1st			
NRW Trophy	5th				
Open d'Andorra	1st				
Pavel Roman Memorial				1st	
Viktor Petrenko Cup			1st		
Volvo Open Cup	8th				

== Detailed results ==
=== Ice dance with Angelina Kudryavtseva ===
ISU personal best scores in the +5/-5 GOE System
Segment	Type	Score	Event
Total	TSS	165.13	2025 CS Golden Spin of Zagreb
Short program	TSS	66.97	2025 CS Golden Spin of Zagreb
Short program	TES	37.91	2025 CS Golden Spin of Zagreb
Short program	PCS	29.20	2024 CS Golden Spin of Zagreb
Free skating	TSS	99.44	2024 CS Nebelhorn Trophy
Free skating	TES	56.64	2024 CS Nebelhorn Trophy
Free skating	PCS	44.00	2025 CS Golden Spin of Zagreb

=== Senior level ===
Results in the 2025–26 season
Date	Event	RD		FD		Total	
Date	Event	P	Score	P	Score	P	Score
Sep 18–21, 2025	(China) 2025 Skate to Milano	11	60.87	9	95.44	11	156.31
Oct 8–11, 2025	(Georgia (country)) 2025 CS Trialeti Trophy	10	57.86	11	86.61	10	144.47
Oct 15–19, 2025	(Italy) 2025 Mezzaluna Cup	4	67.43	9	93.09	6	160.52
Nov 24–30, 2025	(Turkey) 2025 Bosphorus Cup	1	73.68	1	107.07	1	180.75
Dec 3–6, 2025	(Croatia) 2025 CS Golden Spin of Zagreb	5	66.97	8	98.16	7	165.13
Jan 13–18, 2026	(United Kingdom) 2026 European Championships	22	58.10	—N/a	—N/a	22	58.10
Mar 24–29, 2026	(Czech Republic) 2026 World Championships	25	61.94	—N/a	—N/a	25	61.94

2024–2025 season
Date	Event	RD	FD	Total
March 25–30, 2025	2025 World Championships	36; 49.63	–	36; 49.63
January 28 – February 2, 2025	2025 European Championships	21; 59.38	–	21; 59.38
January 7–12, 2025	2025 Sofia Trophy	6; 62.60	7; 97.59	6; 160.19
December 4–7, 2024	2024 CS Golden Spin of Zagreb	8; 61.69	8; 93.36	8; 155.05
Nov. 27 – Dec. 2, 2024	2024 Santa Claus Cup	6; 60.80	7; 91.02	7; 151.82
September 19–21, 2024	2024 CS Nebelhorn Trophy	12; 53.98	7; 99.44	12; 153.42

=== Junior level ===
2023–2024 season
Date	Event	RD	FD	Total
Feb. 26 – Mar. 3, 2024	2024 World Junior Championships	8; 59.68	14; 81.40	11; 141.08
2022–2023 season
Date	Event	RD	FD	Total
Feb. 27 – Mar. 5, 2023	2023 World Junior Championships	10; 61.35	10; 88.51	10; 149.86
Nov. 29 – Dec. 3, 2022	2022 Bosphorus Cup	3; 56.88	1; 96.44	1; 153.32
November 11–12, 2022	2022 Pavel Roman Memorial	1; 63.58	1; 90.96	1; 154.54
October 12–15, 2022	2022 JGP Italy	8; 54.92	7; 83.55	7; 138.47
October 5–8, 2022	2022 JGP Poland II	8; 55.75	4; 87.49	5; 143.24
2021–2022 season
Date	Event	RD	FD	Total
April 13–17, 2022	2022 World Junior Championships	5; 62.15	8; 90.41	8; 152.56
October 20–24, 2021	2021 Viktor Petrenko Cup	1; 63.36	1; 92.29	1; 155.65
Sept. 29 – Oct. 2, 2021	2021 JGP Poland	4; 59.78	3; 89.17	3; 148.95
September 1–4, 2021	2021 JGP Slovakia	4; 60.54	7; 85.59	7; 146.13
2020–2021 season
February 10–13, 2021	2021 LuMi Dance Trophy	1; 69.26	1; 92.32	1; 161.58
Oct. 29 – Nov. 1, 2020	2020 Ice Star	1; 67.11	1; 98.10	1; 165.21
2019–2020 season
March 2–8, 2020	2020 World Junior Championships	18; 52.96	20; 75.01	20; 127.97
February 3–9, 2020	2020 Bavarian Open	8; 54.17	8; 79.50	8; 133.67
December 13–15, 2019	2019 Grand Prix of Bratislava	1; 58.31	2; 86.31	2; 144.62
December 4–7, 2019	2019 Golden Spin of Zagreb	6; 55.44	5; 85.50	5; 141.24
November 21–24, 2019	2019 Open d'Andorra	1; 62.34	1; 89.71	1; 152.05
November 5–10, 2019	2019 Volvo Open Cup	6; 55.34	10; 79.79	8; 135.13
October 14–17, 2019	2019 Ice Star	3; 59.37	10; 78.31	8; 137.68
September 4–7, 2019	2019 JGP Latvia	11; 45.82	9; 79.87	10; 125.69
August 21–24, 2019	2019 JGP France	13; 46.66	14; 67.09	14; 113.75
August 9–11, 2019	2019 NRW Trophy	7; 41.06	4; 74.59	5; 115.65
