= Hole in the Paper Sky =

- Official film poster
- Directed by: Bill Purple
- Written by: Bill Purple
- Screenplay by: Howard Kingkade
- Produced by: Jessica Biel; Michelle Purple
- Starring: Jason Clarke; Jessica Biel; Garry Marshall; Stephen Collins
- Cinematography: Jim Orr
- Edited by: George Folsey Jr.
- Music by: Kerry Muzzey
- Production company: Iron Ocean Films
- Release date: August 7, 2008 (HollyShorts Film Festival)
- Running time: 34 minutes
- Country: U.S.
- Language: English
- Budget: $50,000 (estimated)

Hole in the Paper Sky is 2008 short drama film directed by Bill Purple and produced by Jessica Biel and Michelle Purple of Iron Ocean Films. It stars Jason Clarke, Jessica Biel, Garry Marshall, Stephen Collins and Jeff Nordling and features an original score by Kerry Muzzey. It was released August 7, 2008 at the HollyShorts Film Festival.

== Plot ==
Howard Ferp is a brilliant, but misanthropic, math genius who inexplicably becomes drawn to a friendship with a doomed laboratory dog.

== Cast ==
- Jason Clarke as Howard Ferp
- Jessica Biel as Karen Watkins
- Garry Marshall as Warren
- Stephen Collins as Mr. Benson
- Jeffrey Nordling as Prof. Cory

== Awards ==
Completed in 2008 and released on iTunes and ShortsTV in 2010, Hole in the Paper Sky has garnered numerous awards and honors including:

- Beverly Hills Film Festival
  - Best Short Film
  - Best Screenplay
- Florida Film Festival
  - Best Short Film
- Charleston International Film Festival
  - Best Short Film
- South Dakota Film Festival
  - Best Director

and has been honored at the Holly Shorts Film Festival and Australia’s Flickerfest.
