= Angelina Kudryavtseva =

Russian-Cypriot ice dancer (born 2005)

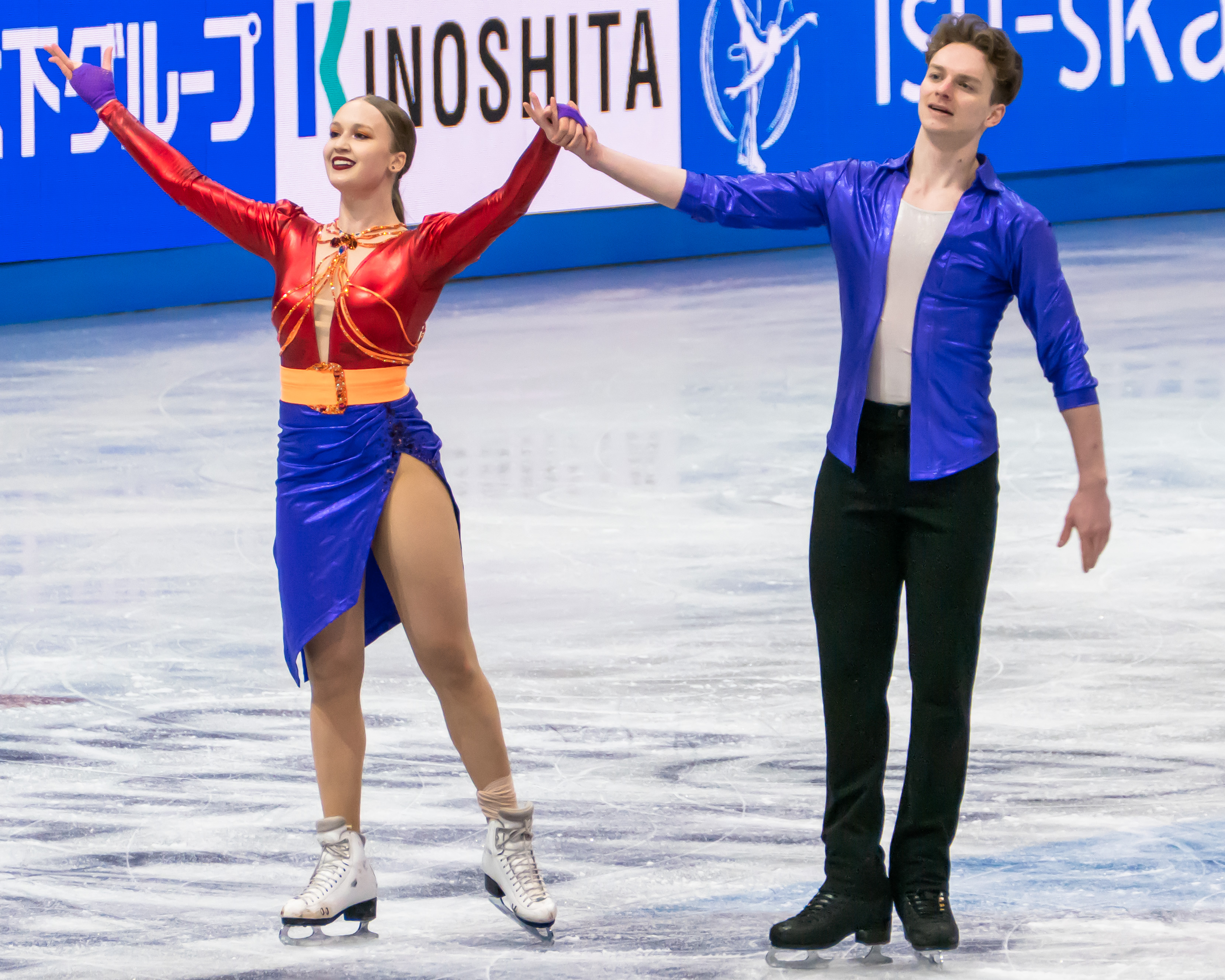
- Kudryavtseva and Karankevich at the 2025 World Championships

Personal information
- Native name: Ангелина Сергеевна Кудрявцева
- Full name: Angelina Sergeyevna Kudryavtseva
- Other names: Kudriavtseva
- Born: 21 October 2005 (age 21) Liubertsy, Moscow, Russia
- Home town: Paphos, Cyprus
- Height: 1.63 m (5 ft 4 in)

Figure skating career
- Country: Cyprus
- Partner: Ilia Karankevich
- Coach: Matteo Zanni; Barbora Reznickova; Katharina Müller; Mattia Dalla Torre; Francesco Corazza
- Skating club: Young Goose Academy, Leader FSC Cyprus
- Began skating: 2009

Angelina Sergeyevna Kudryavtseva (Russian: Ангелина Сергеевна Кудрявцева, Greek: Αντζελίνα Κουντρυβάτσεβα, born 21 October 2005) is a Russian-born Cypriot ice dancer who competes for Cyprus. With her skating partner, Ilia Karankevich, she is the 2023 Cypriot national champion and the 2025 Bosphorus Cup champion. Kudryavtseva/Karankevich are the first ice dance team to represent Cyprus at the European and World Championships.

On the junior level, she is the 2021 JGP Poland bronze medalist and competed in the free dance at two World Junior Championships. Kudryavtseva/Karankevich are the first skaters representing Cyprus, junior or senior, to win a medal at an ISU Grand Prix event.

== Personal life ==
Kudryavtseva was born on 21 October 2005 in Liubertsy, Russia, a suburb of Moscow, to parents Sergei and Olga, both real estate developers. She has an older sister, Ekaterina, and two younger brothers, Alexander and Mikhail.

== Career ==
=== Early years ===
Kudryavtseva began learning how to skate in 2009. She and Ilia Karankevich were announced to have teamed up and represent Cyprus in 2018.

Coached by Alexei Sitnikov and Julia Zlobina in Moscow, the pair won gold at the 2018 Open d'Andorra, at the 2018 Mentor Toruń Cup, and at the 2019 Open Ice Mall Cup on the advanced novice level.

=== 2019–20 season: Junior international debut ===
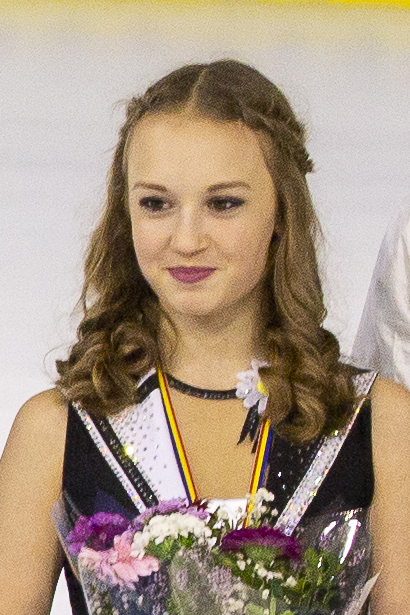
Kudryavtseva at the 2019 Open d'Andorra

Kudryavtseva/Karankevich, made their junior international debut in August 2019 at the NRW Trophy where they placed fifth. From there, the team received two Junior Grand Prix assignments, and at the 2019 JGP France and 2019 JGP Latvia they finished fourteenth and tenth, respectively. They competed six more times internationally in the lead up to the 2020 World Junior Championships, including taking the junior title at the 2019 Open d'Andorra and earning the junior silver medal at 2019 Grand Prix of Bratislava. At Junior Worlds in March, they placed eighteenth in the rhythm dance, which qualified them to advance in the competition. In the free dance, the team dropped to twentieth place in the segment and overall.

=== 2020–21 season ===
Due to the COVID-19 pandemic, Kudryavtseva/Karankevich only had the opportunity to compete twice internationally during the 2020–21 season. They took the junior ice dance titles at the 2020 Ice Star in October 2020 and the 2021 LuMi Dance Trophy in February 2021.

=== 2021–22 season ===
Kudryavtseva/Karankevich opened their third junior season at the 2021 JGP Slovakia in Košice. They set a new personal best to place fourth in the rhythm dance, but later dropped to seventh in the free dance and seventh overall. At their second JGP assignment, 2021 JGP Poland, Kudryavtseva/Karankevich placed fourth in the rhythm dance, scoring just shy of their personal best, but advanced onto the podium by scoring a new personal best in the free dance to place third in that segment and third overall. Their bronze medal was the first medal for Cyprus in ice dance on the Junior Grand Prix circuit.

Due to the pandemic, the 2022 World Junior Championships could not be held as scheduled in Sofia in early March, and as a result were rescheduled for Tallinn in mid-April. Due to Vladimir Putin's invasion of Ukraine, the International Skating Union banned all Russian and Belarusian athletes from participating, which had a significant impact on the dance field. Kudryavtseva/Karankevich placed fifth in the rhythm dance with a new personal best score of 62.15. They were eighth in the free dance, dropping to eighth overall.

Following the season, Kudryavtseva/Karankevich relocated from Moscow, Russia to Egna, Italy where Matteo Zanni, Barbora Řezníčková, and Denis Lodola became their new coaches.

=== 2022–23 season ===
Returning to the Junior Grand Prix, Kudryavtseva/Karankevich came fifth at the 2022 JGP Poland and seventh at the 2022 JGP Italy. They later won gold at both the Bosphorus Cup and the Pavel Roman Memorial.

Kudryavtseva/Karankevich finished the season with a tenth-place finish at the 2023 World Junior Championships.

=== 2023–24 season ===
During their first Junior Grand Prix assignment at the 2023 JGP Austria, Kudryavtseva/Karankevich collided with another team during practice, leading to Kudryavtseva breaking two bones. Subsequently, Kudryavtseva/Karankevich withdrew from both of their Junior Grand Prix assignments.

Kudryavtseva/Karankevich competed in their first competition of the season at the 2024 World Junior Championships, where they placed eleventh.

=== 2024–25 season ===
Kudryavtseva/Karankevich started their season by competing on the 2024–25 Challenger Series, finishing twelfth at the 2024 CS Nebelhorn Trophy and eighth at the 2024 CS Golden Spin of Zagreb. Between the two events, the duo would also place seventh at the 2024 Santa Claus Cup.

In January, Kudryavtseva/Karankevich placed sixth at the 2025 Sofia Trophy. Two weeks later, they made their Senior Championship debut at the 2025 European Championships in Tallinn, Estonia. They placed twenty-first in the rhythm dance and did not advance to the free dance segment. They followed up this result with a sixth-place finish at the 2025 Egna Dance Trophy.

They closed the season by finishing thirty-sixth at the 2025 World Championships in Boston, Massachusetts, United States.

=== 2025–26 season ===
Kudryavtseva/Karankevich opened their season with an eleventh-place finish at the ISU Skate to Milano. They then went on to finish tenth at the 2025 CS Trialeti Trophy and sixth at the 2025 Mezzaluna Cup. In late November, Kudryavtseva/Karankevich won their first senior international medal, a gold, at the 2025 Bosphorus Cup. One week later, they placed seventh at the 2025 CS Golden Spin of Zagreb.

In January, Kudryavtseva/Karankevich finished twenty-second at the 2026 European Championships in Sheffield, England, United Kingdom.

== Programs ==
=== Ice dance with Ilia Karankevich ===
| Season | Rhythm dance | Free dance |
|---|---|---|
| 2025–2026 | Larger Than Life; Everybody (Backstreet's Back); Larger Than Life by Backstreet Boys choreo. by Matteo Zanni, Evgenia Kozhukhanova, Marco Pipani, Matteo Dal Pra | Autumn Leaves by Joseph Kosma performed by Seal; Autumn Leaves (Remastered) arranged by Maxime Rodriguez & Ludivine Amado choreo. by Matteo Zanni, Evgenia Kozhukhanova, Marco Pipani, Matteo Dal Pra |
| 2024–2025 | Knock on Wood by Eddie Floyd performed by Amii Stewart; Tragedy (Moreno J Remix); Tragedy by Bee Gees choreo. by Matteo Zanni, Marco Pipani, Angus Simpson | The Imaginarium of Doctor Parnassus by Mychael Danna & Jeff Danna; Reminiscence by Florian Christl choreo. by Matteo Zanni, Marco Pipani, Angus Simpson |
| 2023–2024 | Like a Prayer; Spanish Eyes; Material Girl Madonna choreo. by Matteo Zanni, Marco Pipani, Fabio Bollue | Le notti di Cabiria by Nino Rota choreo. by Matteo Zanni, Marco Pipani, Fabio Bollue |
| 2022–2023 | Tango: La cumparsita (Questo Tango) by Gerardo Matos Rodriguez performed by Milva; Flamenco: El Fuego by Sean Peter, feat. Oscar Jimenez | It's Tricky by Run-DMC; How Deep Is Your Love by the Bee Gees; Get Ready For This by 2 Unlimited |
| 2021–2022 | Ruby Blue by Róisín Murphy and Jule Styne choreo. by Dmitri Ionov, Maxim Chebotarev | Nuvole bianche by Ludovico Einaudi choreo. by Artem Khromih |
| 2020–2021 | Quickstep: You Gotta Get a Gimmick; Foxtrot: Seattle to Los Angeles (from Gypsy) by Stephen Sondheim and Jule Styne choreo. by Dmitri Ionov | Nuvole bianche by Ludovico Einaudi choreo. by Artem Khromih |
| 2019–2020 | Quickstep: You Gotta Get a Gimmick; Foxtrot: Seattle to Los Angeles (from Gypsy) by Stephen Sondheim and Jule Styne choreo. by Dmitri Ionov | Ça déroule; Droite de cité; Diabolique by Raphael Beau choreo. by Dmitri Ionov |

== Competitive highlights ==
- JGP – Event of the ISU Junior Grand Prix Series
- CS – Event of the ISU Challenger Series
- TBD – Assigned
- C – Event was cancelled

=== Ice dance with Ilia Karankevich ===
Competition placements at senior level
| Season | 2022–23 | 2024–25 | 2025–26 |
|---|---|---|---|
| World Championships | | 36th | 25th |
| European Championships | | 21st | 22nd |
| Cyprus Championships | 1st | | |
| CS Golden Spin of Zagreb | | 8th | 7th |
| CS Nebelhorn Trophy | | 12th | |
| CS Trialeti Trophy | | | 10th |
| Bosphorus Cup | | | 1st |
| Egna Dance Trophy | | 5th | |
| Mezzaluna Cup | | | 6th |
| Santa Claus Cup | | 7th | |
| Skate to Milano | | | 11th |
| Sofia Trophy | | 6th | |

Competition placements at junior level
| Season | 2019–20 | 2020–21 | 2021–22 | 2022–23 | 2023–24 |
|---|---|---|---|---|---|
| World Junior Championships | 20th | C | 8th | 10th | 11th |
| JGP France | 14th | | | | |
| JGP Italy | | | | 7th | |
| JGP Latvia | 10th | | | | |
| JGP Poland | | | 3rd | 5th | |
| JGP Slovakia | | | 7th | | |
| Bavarian Open | 8th | | 1st | | |
| Bosphorus Cup | | | | 1st | |
| Golden Spin of Zagreb | 5th | | | | |
| Grand Prix of Bratislava | 2nd | | | | |
| Ice Star | 8th | 1st | | | |
| LuMi Dance Trophy | | 1st | | | |
| NRW Trophy | 5th | | | | |
| Open d'Andorra | 1st | | | | |
| Pavel Roman Memorial | | | | 1st | |
| Viktor Petrenko Cup | | | 1st | | |
| Volvo Open Cup | 8th | | | | |

== Detailed results ==
=== Ice dance with Ilia Karankevich ===
ISU personal best scores in the +5/-5 GOE System
| Segment | Type | Score | Event |
|---|---|---|---|
| Total | TSS | 165.13 | 2025 CS Golden Spin of Zagreb |
| Short program | TSS | 66.97 | 2025 CS Golden Spin of Zagreb |
| Short program | TES | 37.91 | 2025 CS Golden Spin of Zagreb |
| Short program | PCS | 29.20 | 2024 CS Golden Spin of Zagreb |
| Free skating | TSS | 99.44 | 2024 CS Nebelhorn Trophy |
| Free skating | TES | 56.64 | 2024 CS Nebelhorn Trophy |
| Free skating | PCS | 44.00 | 2025 CS Golden Spin of Zagreb |

=== Senior level ===
Results in the 2025–26 season
| Date | Event | RD | | FD | | Total | |
| Date | Event | P | Score | P | Score | P | Score |
|---|---|---|---|---|---|---|---|
| Sep 18–21, 2025 | (China) 2025 ISU Skate to Milano | 11 | 60.87 | 9 | 95.44 | 11 | 156.31 |
| Oct 8–11, 2025 | (Georgia (country)) 2025 CS Trialeti Trophy | 10 | 57.86 | 11 | 86.61 | 10 | 144.47 |
| Oct 15–19, 2025 | (Italy) 2025 Mezzaluna Cup | 4 | 67.43 | 9 | 93.09 | 6 | 160.52 |
| Nov 24–30, 2025 | (Turkey) 2025 Bosphorus Cup | 1 | 73.68 | 1 | 107.07 | 1 | 180.75 |
| Dec 3–6, 2025 | (Croatia) 2025 CS Golden Spin of Zagreb | 5 | 66.97 | 8 | 98.16 | 7 | 165.13 |
| Jan 13–18, 2026 | (United Kingdom) 2026 European Championships | 22 | 58.10 | —N/a | —N/a | 22 | 58.10 |
| Mar 24–29, 2026 | (Czech Republic) 2026 World Championships | 25 | 61.94 | —N/a | —N/a | 25 | 61.94 |

2024–2025 season
| Date | Event | RD | FD | Total |
|---|---|---|---|---|
| March 25–30, 2025 | 2025 World Championships | 36; 49.63 | – | 36; 49.63 |
| January 28 – February 2, 2025 | 2025 European Championships | 21; 59.38 | – | 21; 59.38 |
| January 7–12, 2025 | 2025 Sofia Trophy | 6; 62.60 | 7; 97.59 | 6; 160.19 |
| December 4–7, 2024 | 2024 CS Golden Spin of Zagreb | 8; 61.69 | 8; 93.36 | 8; 155.05 |
| Nov. 27 – Dec. 2, 2024 | 2024 Santa Claus Cup | 6; 60.80 | 7; 91.02 | 7; 151.82 |
| September 19–21, 2024 | 2024 CS Nebelhorn Trophy | 12; 53.98 | 7; 99.44 | 12; 153.42 |

=== Junior level ===
2023–2024 season
| Date | Event | RD | FD | Total |
|---|---|---|---|---|
| Feb. 26 – Mar. 3, 2024 | 2024 World Junior Championships | 8; 59.68 | 14; 81.40 | 11; 141.08 |
2022–2023 season
| Date | Event | RD | FD | Total |
| Feb. 27 – Mar. 5, 2023 | 2023 World Junior Championships | 10; 61.35 | 10; 88.51 | 10; 149.86 |
| Nov. 29 – Dec. 3, 2022 | 2022 Bosphorus Cup | 3; 56.88 | 1; 96.44 | 1; 153.32 |
| November 11–12, 2022 | 2022 Pavel Roman Memorial | 1; 63.58 | 1; 90.96 | 1; 154.54 |
| October 12–15, 2022 | 2022 JGP Italy | 8; 54.92 | 7; 83.55 | 7; 138.47 |
| October 5–8, 2022 | 2022 JGP Poland II | 8; 55.75 | 4; 87.49 | 5; 143.24 |
2021–2022 season
| Date | Event | RD | FD | Total |
| April 13–17, 2022 | 2022 World Junior Championships | 5; 62.15 | 8; 90.41 | 8; 152.56 |
| October 20–24, 2021 | 2021 Viktor Petrenko Cup | 1; 63.36 | 1; 92.29 | 1; 155.65 |
| Sept. 29 – Oct. 2, 2021 | 2021 JGP Poland | 4; 59.78 | 3; 89.17 | 3; 148.95 |
| September 1–4, 2021 | 2021 JGP Slovakia | 4; 60.54 | 7; 85.59 | 7; 146.13 |
2020–2021 season
| February 10–13, 2021 | 2021 LuMi Dance Trophy | 1; 69.26 | 1; 92.32 | 1; 161.58 |
| Oct. 29 – Nov. 1, 2020 | 2020 Ice Star | 1; 67.11 | 1; 98.10 | 1; 165.21 |
2019–2020 season
| March 2–8, 2020 | 2020 World Junior Championships | 18; 52.96 | 20; 75.01 | 20; 127.97 |
| February 3–9, 2020 | 2020 Bavarian Open | 8; 54.17 | 8; 79.50 | 8; 133.67 |
| December 13–15, 2019 | 2019 Grand Prix of Bratislava | 1; 58.31 | 2; 86.31 | 2; 144.62 |
| December 4–7, 2019 | 2019 Golden Spin of Zagreb | 6; 55.44 | 5; 85.50 | 5; 141.24 |
| November 21–24, 2019 | 2019 Open d'Andorra | 1; 62.34 | 1; 89.71 | 1; 152.05 |
| November 5–10, 2019 | 2019 Volvo Open Cup | 6; 55.34 | 10; 79.79 | 8; 135.13 |
| October 14–17, 2019 | 2019 Ice Star | 3; 59.37 | 10; 78.31 | 8; 137.68 |
| September 4–7, 2019 | 2019 JGP Latvia | 11; 45.82 | 9; 79.87 | 10; 125.69 |
| August 21–24, 2019 | 2019 JGP France | 13; 46.66 | 14; 67.09 | 14; 113.75 |
| August 9–11, 2019 | 2019 NRW Trophy | 7; 41.06 | 4; 74.59 | 5; 115.65 |
