= Kerry Muzzey =

American classical composer (born 1970)

- Born: Kerry Muzzey; April 26, 1970; Joliet, Illinois, U.S.
- Genres: Film score, Classical Music
- Occupations: Film Composer, Composer
- Instruments: Piano, Keyboard, Organ, Logic Pro
- Years active: 1993-present
- Website: www.kerrymuzzey.com

Kerry Muzzey (born 1970) is an American classical composer.

== Early life ==
Muzzey was born and raised in Joliet, Illinois. Muzzey graduated from Millikin University in Decatur, Illinois, with a degree in piano performance.

Muzzey resides in Los Angeles.

== Career ==
In 2007, he was commissioned by director Bill Purple and Iron Ocean Films' executive producers Jessica Biel and Michelle Purple to create the score for Iron Ocean Films' first film, Hole in the Paper Sky. In that same year he also lent several instrumental compositions to the documentary, The Unforeseen, directed by Laura Dunn. Muzzey also scored the film Amexicano.

In 2009, Muzzey was approached by the music supervisor of Glee about using Muzzey's composition "Looking Back" as a love theme in the first two episodes of the series. The music was somewhat well received and was used in multiple episodes of the series. In 2011, Muzzey was commissioned to score the Wendie Malick film What Happens Next, followed by Holiday Engagement.

Muzzey's contemporary classical music has been featured on So You Think You Can Dance, for which Muzzey created a custom version of his composition "Bernini's Angels" In 2012, choreographer Christopher Scott used Muzzey's composition "Architect of the Mind" as the opening number for the show's Top 20 dancers. In 2012 Muzzey again collaborated with choreographer Christopher Scott and director Jon M. Chu to compose the music for "Earth Chorus," a composition that used NASA recordings of the Earth's sounds as heard from space and turned them into musical instruments. The video was performed by The Legion of Extraordinary Dancers.

In August 2014, Muzzey released the album The Architect, which was recorded at AIR Lyndhurst by the Chamber Orchestra of London. The album debuted at #5 on the iTunes Classical Chart and simultaneously debuted at #5 on the Billboard Classical Chart. The album also spent three months in featured placement on the iTunes Classical storefront. In 2015, Muzzey scored the documentary film The Seer (later retitled Look & See: A Portrait of Wendell Berry)

In 2017, Muzzey was commissioned to create the original score for Northern Ballet's full length ballet, Casanova, which premiered in London at Sadler's Wells to mixed reviews.

Muzzey is known for his efforts to protect his musical copyrights against unauthorized use. YouTube’s ContentID brought up approximately 20,000 videos containing his music within its first month of operation, he later stated in his 2020 senate testimony that a further 25-50 videos were flagged daily. Through this, it was found that China Central Television (CCTV), had incorporated his compositions into 17 television programmes and films without obtaining licenses. Muzzey filed numerous copyright strikes against the broadcaster's YouTube channels under the United States Digital Millennium Copyright Act, eventually compelling CCTV to negotiate a licensing agreement with him following nine months of discussions.

In 2026, Muzzey rescinded the rights for a Czech ice dance team for Czech to use his music half way through the season. This forced the team to pivot and become the first people to use an AI composition at the 2026 Milano-Cortina Olympics, thus avoiding dealing with a copyright issues at all.
