= 2023–24 ISU Junior Grand Prix =

Figure skating competition series

- Type: ISU Junior Grand Prix
- Date: August 23 – December 10, 2023
- Season: 2023–24
- Previous: 2022–23 ISU Junior Grand Prix
- Next: 2024–25 ISU Junior Grand Prix

The 2023–24 ISU Junior Grand Prix was a series of junior international competitions organized by the International Skating Union that were held from August 2023 through December 2023. It was the junior-level complement to the 2023–24 ISU Grand Prix of Figure Skating. Medals were awarded in men's singles, women's singles, pair skating, and ice dance. Skaters earned points based on their placement at each event and the top six in each discipline qualified to compete at the 2023–24 Junior Grand Prix Final in Beijing, China.

== Competitions ==
The locations of the JGP events change annually. This season, the series was composed of the following events:

| Date | Event | Location | Notes | Results |
|---|---|---|---|---|
| August 23–26 | 2023 JGP Thailand | Bangkok, Thailand | No pairs | Details |
| August 30 – September 2 | 2023 JGP Austria | Linz, Austria | | Details |
| September 6–9 | 2023 JGP Turkey | Istanbul, Turkey | | Details |
| September 13–16 | 2023 JGP Japan | Osaka, Japan | No pairs | Details |
| September 20–23 | 2023 JGP Hungary | Budapest, Hungary | | Details |
| September 27–30 | 2023 JGP Poland | Gdańsk, Poland | | Details |
| October 4–7 | 2023 JGP Armenia | Yerevan, Armenia | No pairs | Details |
| December 7–10 | (China) 2023–24 JGP Final | Beijing, China | | |

== Entries ==
Skaters who reached the age of 13 before July 1, 2023, but had not turned 19 (singles skaters and female pairs or ice dance skaters) or 21 (male pairs or ice dance skaters) were eligible to compete on the junior circuit. Competitors were chosen by their countries according to their federations' selection procedures. The number of entries allotted to each ISU member federation was determined by their skaters' placements at the 2023 World Junior Championships in each discipline.

=== Number of entries per discipline ===
Based on the results of the 2023 World Junior Championships, each ISU member nation was allowed to field the following number of entries per event.

Singles and ice dance
| Entries | Men | Women | Ice dance |
|---|---|---|---|
| Two entries in seven events | Japan; Switzerland; Italy | Japan; South Korea; China | Czech Republic; South Korea; Canada |
| One entry in seven events | Canada; South Korea; United States | Switzerland; United States; Georgia | Great Britain; United States; France |
| One entry in six events | China; Estonia; Sweden; France | Canada; France; Estonia; Latvia | Cyprus; Israel; Ukraine; Germany |
| One entry in five events | Slovakia; Ukraine; Kazakhstan; Great Britain; Georgia; Poland; Hungary | Hungary; Cyprus; Poland; Czech Republic; Thailand; Belgium; Netherlands | Japan; Italy; Georgia |
| One entry in four events | Israel; New Zealand; Chinese Taipei; Finland; Slovenia | Israel; Finland; Italy; Slovakia; Germany; Austria | Switzerland; China; Poland; Austria |
| One entry in three events | Turkey; Germany; Hong Kong; Armenia; Spain; Latvia; Austria; Lithuania; Bulgaria | Slovenia; Sweden; Mexico; Turkey; Kazakhstan; Malaysia; Denmark; Great Britain; Norway; Lithuania; Philippines; Australia; Hong Kong; Romania; Greece; Bulgaria; Ukraine | Spain; Turkey; Hungary; Belgium; Mexico |

- If not listed above, one entry in two events is allowed.
- Host federations may enter up to three spots per discipline.

Pairs
| Entries | Pairs |
|---|---|
| Three entries in four events | United States; Australia; Ukraine; Japan |
| Two entries in four events | France; Canada; Czech Republic; China; Germany |

- If not listed above, one entry in three events is allowed.
- Host federations have an unlimited number of entries.

== Medal summary ==
=== Men's singles ===
| Competition | Gold | Silver | Bronze | Results |
|---|---|---|---|---|
| JGP Thailand | (Japan) Rio Nakata | (France) François Pitot | (New Zealand) Li Yanhao | Details |
| JGP Austria | (Slovakia) Adam Hagara | (South Korea) Kim Hyun-gyeom | (United States) Beck Strommer | Details |
| JGP Turkey | (South Korea) Seo Min-kyu | (Japan) Rio Nakata | (Japan) Daiya Ebihara | Details |
| JGP Japan | (France) François Pitot | (South Korea) Lim Ju-heon | (United States) Daniel Martynov | Details |
| JGP Hungary | (South Korea) Kim Hyun-gyeom | (Switzerland) Naoki Rossi | (Japan) Haru Kakiuchi | Details |
| JGP Poland | (South Korea) Lim Ju-heon | (United States) Beck Strommer | (Japan) Daiya Ebihara | Details |
| JGP Armenia | (United States) Daniel Martynov | (Japan) Shunsuke Nakamura | (Latvia) Fedir Kulish | Details |
| (China) JGP Final | (Japan) Rio Nakata | (South Korea) Kim Hyun-gyeom | (Slovakia) Adam Hagara | Details |

=== Women's singles ===
| Competition | Gold | Silver | Bronze | Results |
|---|---|---|---|---|
| JGP Thailand | (Japan) Ami Nakai | (South Korea) Kim Yu-seong | (South Korea) Han Hee-sue | Details |
| JGP Austria | (South Korea) Shin Ji-a | (Japan) Haruna Murakami | (South Korea) Kwon Min-sol | Details |
| JGP Turkey | (Japan) Ami Nakai | (Japan) Rena Uezono | (South Korea) Kim Yu-jae | Details |
| JGP Japan | (Japan) Mao Shimada | (Japan) Yo Takagi | (Chinese Taipei) Tsai Yu-Feng | Details |
| JGP Hungary | (South Korea) Shin Ji-a | (South Korea) Kim Yu-seong | (Japan) Ayumi Shibayama | Details |
| JGP Poland | (Japan) Rena Uezono | (South Korea) Kwon Min-sol | (South Korea) Youn Seo-jin | Details |
| JGP Armenia | (Japan) Mao Shimada | (United States) Elyce Lin-Gracey | (United States) Sherry Zhang | Details |
| (China) JGP Final | (Japan) Mao Shimada | (South Korea) Shin Ji-a | (Japan) Rena Uezono | Details |

=== Pairs ===
| Competition | Gold | Silver | Bronze | Results |
|---|---|---|---|---|
| JGP Austria | (Canada) Martina Ariano Kent / Charly Laliberté Laurent | (United States) Olivia Flores / Luke Wang | (China) Shi Wenning / Wang Zhiyu | Details |
| JGP Turkey | (Georgia (country)) Anastasiia Metelkina / Luka Berulava | (United States) Olivia Flores / Luke Wang | (Canada) Jazmine Desrochers / Kieran Thrasher | Details |
| JGP Hungary | (Georgia (country)) Anastasiia Metelkina / Luka Berulava | (Ukraine) Violetta Sierova / Ivan Khobta | (Canada) Martina Ariano Kent / Charly Laliberté Laurent | Details |
| JGP Poland | (Canada) Ava Kemp / Yohnatan Elizarov | (Ukraine) Violetta Sierova / Ivan Khobta | (Canada) Jazmine Desrochers / Kieran Thrasher | Details |
| (China) JGP Final | (Georgia (country)) Anastasiia Metelkina / Luka Berulava | (Canada) Ava Kemp / Yohnatan Elizarov | (Canada) Jazmine Desrochers / Kieran Thrasher | Details |

=== Ice dance ===
| Competition | Gold | Silver | Bronze | Results |
|---|---|---|---|---|
| JGP Thailand | (United States) Leah Neset / Artem Markelov | (France) Célina Fradji / Jean-Hans Forneaux | (South Korea) Kim Jinny / Lee Na-mu | Details |
| JGP Austria | (Germany) Darya Grimm / Michail Savitskiy | (Canada) Chloe Nguyen / Brendan Giang | (United States) Elliana Peal / Ethan Peal | Details |
| JGP Turkey | (Ukraine) Mariia Pinchuk / Mykyta Pogorielov | (United States) Yahli Pedersen / Jeffrey Chen | (Switzerland) Gina Zehnder / Beda Leon Sieber | Details |
| JGP Japan | (United States) Leah Neset / Artem Markelov | (Israel) Elizabeth Tkachenko / Alexei Kiliakov | (France) Célina Fradji / Jean-Hans Forneaux | Details |
| JGP Hungary | (Ukraine) Iryna Pidgaina / Artem Koval | (United States) Yahli Pedersen / Jeffrey Chen | (France) Dania Mouaden / Théo Bigot | Details |
| JGP Poland | (Germany) Darya Grimm / Michail Savitskiy | (Ukraine) Mariia Pinchuk / Mykyta Pogorielov | (Japan) Sara Kishimoto / Atsuhiko Tamura | Details |
| JGP Armenia | (Israel) Elizabeth Tkachenko / Alexei Kiliakov | (United States) Elliana Peal / Ethan Peal | (Italy) Noemi Maria Tali / Noah Lafornara | Details |
| (China) JGP Final | (United States) Leah Neset / Artem Markelov | (Israel) Elizabeth Tkachenko / Alexei Kiliakov | (Germany) Darya Grimm / Michail Savitskiy | Details |

=== Medal table ===
| Rank | Nation | Gold | Silver | Bronze | Total |
|---|---|---|---|---|---|
| 1 | Japan | 8 | 5 | 6 | 19 |
| 2 | South Korea | 5 | 7 | 5 | 17 |
| 3 | United States | 4 | 7 | 4 | 15 |
| 4 | Georgia | 3 | 0 | 0 | 3 |
| 5 | Ukraine | 2 | 3 | 0 | 5 |
| 6 | Canada | 2 | 2 | 4 | 8 |
| 7 | Germany | 2 | 0 | 1 | 3 |
| 8 | France | 1 | 2 | 2 | 5 |
| 9 | Israel | 1 | 2 | 0 | 3 |
| 10 | Slovakia | 1 | 0 | 1 | 2 |
| 11 | Switzerland | 0 | 1 | 1 | 2 |
| 12 | China | 0 | 0 | 1 | 1 |
| 12 | Chinese Taipei | 0 | 0 | 1 | 1 |
| 12 | Italy | 0 | 0 | 1 | 1 |
| 12 | Latvia | 0 | 0 | 1 | 1 |
| 12 | New Zealand | 0 | 0 | 1 | 1 |
| Totals (16 entries) | | 29 | 29 | 29 | 87 |

== Qualification ==
At each event, skaters earned points toward qualification for the Junior Grand Prix Final. Following the seventh event, the top six highest-scoring skaters/teams advanced to the Final. The points earned per placement were as follows:

| Placement | Singles | Pairs/Ice dance |
|---|---|---|
| 1st | 15 | 15 |
| 2nd | 13 | 13 |
| 3rd | 11 | 11 |
| 4th | 9 | 9 |
| 5th | 7 | 7 |
| 6th | 5 | 5 |
| 7th | 4 | 4 |
| 8th | 3 | 3 |
| 9th | 2 | —N/a |
| 10th | 1 | —N/a |

There were originally seven tie-breakers in cases of a tie in overall points:

1. Highest placement at an event. If a skater placed 1st and 3rd, the tiebreaker is the 1st place, and that beats a skater who placed 2nd in both events.
2. Highest combined total scores in both events. If a skater earned 200 points at one event and 250 at a second, that skater would win in the second tie-break over a skater who earned 200 points at one event and 150 at another.
3. Participated in two events.
4. Highest combined scores in the free skating/free dance portion of both events.
5. Highest individual score in the free skating/free dance portion from one event.
6. Highest combined scores in the short program/short dance of both events.
7. Highest number of total participants at the events.

If a tie remained, it was considered unbreakable and the tied skaters all advanced to the Junior Grand Prix Final.

=== Qualification standings ===
| Points | Men | Women | Pairs | Ice dance |
|---|---|---|---|---|
| 30 | —N/a | (Japan) Mao Shimada (South Korea) Shin Ji-a (Japan) Ami Nakai | (Georgia (country)) Anastasia Metelkina / Luka Berulava | (United States) Leah Neset / Artem Markelov (Germany) Darya Grimm / Michail Savitskiy |
| 28 | (Japan) Rio Nakata (South Korea) Lim Ju-heon (France) François Pitot (South Korea) Kim Hyun-gyeom | (Japan) Rena Uezono | —N/a | (Israel) Elizabeth Tkachenko / Alexei Kiliakov (Ukraine) Mariia Pinchuk / Mykyta Pogorielov |
| 26 | (United States) Daniel Martynov | (South Korea) Kim Yu-seong | (Canada) Martina Ariano Kent / Charly Laliberté Laurent (Ukraine) Violetta Sierova / Ivan Khobta (United States) Olivia Flores / Luke Wang | (United States) Yahli Pedersen / Jeffrey Chen |
| 24 | (Slovakia) Adam Hagara (United States) Beck Strommer | (South Korea) Kwon Min-sol | (Canada) Ava Kemp / Yohnatan Elizarov | (France) Célina Fradji / Jean-Hans Fourneaux (United States) Elliana Peal / Ethan Peal |
| 22 | (South Korea) Seo Min-kyu (Japan) Daiya Ebihara | (Japan) Yo Takagi (United States) Elyce Lin-Gracey | (Canada) Jazmine Desrochers / Kieran Thrasher | —N/a |
| 20 | (Switzerland) Naoki Rossi | —N/a | —N/a | (Ukraine) Iryna Pidgaina / Artem Koval (Japan) Sara Kishimoto / Atsuhiko Tamura (Switzerland) Gina Zehnder / Beda Leon Sieber |
| 18 | (New Zealand) Yanhao Li (Latvia) Fedir Kulish | (South Korea) Youn Seo-jin (United States) Sherry Zhang (Japan) Ikura Kushida | —N/a | (Canada) Chloe Nguyen / Brendan Giang (United Kingdom) Ashlie Slatter / Atl Ongay-Perez |
| 16 | (Japan) Shunsuke Nakamura (United States) Jacob Sanchez | (Japan) Ayumi Shibayama | (France) Louise Ehrhard / Mathis Pellegris | —N/a |
| 15 | (Japan) Haru Kakiuchi | —N/a | (China) Shi Wenning / Wang Zhiyu | —N/a |
| 14 | (United States) Michael Xie (United Kingdom) Edward Appleby (Georgia (country)) Konstantin Supatashvili | (France) Stefania Gladki | —N/a | (France) Dania Mouaden / Théo Bigot (China) Lin Yufei / Gao Zijian (France) Ambre Perrier Gianesini / Samuel Blanc Klaperman |
| 13 | —N/a | (Japan) Haruna Murakami (Chinese Taipei) Tsai Yu-Feng (Switzerland) Anastasia Brandenburg | (China) Yang Yixi / Deng Shunyang | (Canada) Layla Veillon / Alexander Brandys (Italy) Giulia Paolino / Andrea Tuba |
| 12 | —N/a | —N/a | (France) Romane Télémaque / Lucas Coulon (Italy) Irina Napolitano / Edoardo Comi | (France) Eva Bernard / Amedeo Bonetto |
| 11 | (Israel) Tamir Kuperman | (South Korea) Han Hee-sue (South Korea) Kim Yu-jae (Finland) Iida Karhunen | —N/a | (South Korea) Kim Jinny / Lee Na-mu (Italy) Noemi Maria Tali / Noah Lafornara (United States) Caroline Mullen / Brendan Mullen |
| 10 | (Poland) Jakub Lofek | —N/a | —N/a | (Canada) Dana Sabatini-Speciale / Nicholas Buelow |
| 9 | (China) Tian Tonghe (United States) Aleksandr Fegan | (China) Wang Yihan (Israel) Sophia Shifrin | —N/a | —N/a |
| 8 | —N/a | (Switzerland) Anthea Gradinaru | —N/a | (United Kingdom) Molly Hairsine / Alessio Surenkov-Gultchev |
| 7 | (Canada) David Li | (South Korea) Hwang Jeon-gyul (South Korea) Park Eun-bi (United States) Annika Chao (Georgia (country)) Inga Gurgenidze (China) Tong Ruichen | (United Kingdom) Lucy Hay / Kyle McLeod (Germany) Anastasia Steblyanka / Lukas Gneiding | (Canada) Alisa Korneva / Kieran MacDonald |
| 6 | —N/a | (Latvia) Sofja Stepčenko | (Germany) Sonja Löwenherz / Robert Löwenherz | —N/a |
| 5 | (South Korea) Lee Jae-keun (Slovakia) Lukáš Václavík (Ukraine) Kyrylo Lishenko (Armenia) Semen Daniliants | (Australia) Hana Bath (United States) Sarah Everhardt (China) Gao Shiqi | (Czech Republic) Debora Anna Cohen / Lukáš Vochozka (United States) Adele Zheng / Andy Deng (Italy) Polina Polman / Gabriel Renoldi | (Georgia (country)) Mariia Alieva / Yehor Barshak (United States) Olivia Ilin / Dylan Cain (Czech Republic) Natálie Blaasová / Filip Blaas (Canada) Jamie Fournier / Everest Zhu |
| 4 | (Israel) Nikita Sheiko (Sweden) Elias Sayed (Switzerland) Noah Bodenstein (China) Chen Yudong (Turkey) Ali Efe Güneş | (Canada) Hetty Shi (Canada) Kara Yun (Canada) Lulu Lin (Hungary) Polina Dzsumanyijazova | (Spain) Inés Moudden / Alejandro Lázaro García (Israel) Sofia Enkina / Nikita Kovalenko | (Poland) Sofia Dovhal / Wiktor Kulesza (Belgium) Sofiia Beznosikova / Max Leleu (Switzerland) Maelle Ledermann / Antonin Emo (United States) Amy Cui / Kenny Eckert |
| 3 | (China) Han Wenbao (Italy) Matteo Nalbone (France) Ilia Gogitidze (Chinese Taipei) Li Yu-Hsiang (Poland) Matvii Yefymenko | (Czech Republic) Jana Horčičková (Switzerland) Eugenia Sekulovski (United States) Mia Kalin (United States) Josephine Lee (Estonia) Maria Eliise Kaljuvere | (Spain) Linda de Nardin / Patrizio Romano Rossi López | (Czech Republic) Eliška Žáková / Filip Mencl (France) Estelle Bouillet / Martin Chardain (Canada) Auréa Cinçon-Debout / Earl Jesse Celestino |
| 2 | (Lithuania) Luka Imedashvili (Japan) Taiga Nishino (Canada) Grayson Long (Finland) Arttu Juusola (United States) Kai Kovar | (Lithuania) Gabriele Juskaite (Finland) Petra Lahti (Canada) Uliana Shiryaeva | —N/a | |
| 1 | (Finland) Matias Lindfors (Japan) Seigo Tauchi (Switzerland) Georgii Pavlov (Canada) Shohei Law | (Estonia) Nataly Langerbaur (China) Li Ruotang (China) Zhang Mengqi | —N/a | |

=== Qualifiers ===
| No. | Men | Women | Pairs | Ice dance |
|---|---|---|---|---|
| 1 | (Japan) Rio Nakata | (Japan) Mao Shimada | (Georgia (country)) Anastasia Metelkina / Luka Berulava | (United States) Leah Neset / Artem Markelov |
| 2 | (South Korea) Lim Ju-heon | (South Korea) Shin Ji-a | (Canada) Martina Ariano Kent / Charly Laliberté Laurent | (Germany) Darya Grimm / Michail Savitskiy |
| 3 | (France) François Pitot | (Japan) Ami Nakai | (Ukraine) Violetta Sierova / Ivan Khobta | (Israel) Elizabeth Tkachenko / Alexei Kiliakov |
| 4 | (South Korea) Kim Hyun-gyeom | (Japan) Rena Uezono | (United States) Olivia Flores / Luke Wang | (Ukraine) Mariia Pinchuk / Mykyta Pogorielov |
| 5 | (United States) Daniel Martynov | (South Korea) Kim Yu-seong | (Canada) Ava Kemp / Yohnatan Elizarov | (United States) Yahli Pedersen / Jeffrey Chen |
| 6 | (Slovakia) Adam Hagara | (South Korea) Kwon Min-sol | (Canada) Jazmine Desrochers / Kieran Thrasher | (France) Célina Fradji / Jean-Hans Fourneaux |

Alternates

| No. | Men | Women | Pairs | Ice dance |
|---|---|---|---|---|
| 1 | (United States) Beck Strommer | (Japan) Yo Takagi | (France) Louise Ehrhard / Mathis Pellegris | (United States) Elliana Peal / Ethan Peal |
| 2 | (South Korea) Seo Min-kyu | (United States) Elyce Lin-Gracey | (China) Shi Wenning / Wang Zhiyu | (Ukraine) Iryna Pidgaina / Artem Koval |
| 3 | (Japan) Daiya Ebihara | (South Korea) Youn Seo-jin | (China) Yang Yixi / Deng Shunyang | (Japan) Sara Kishimoto / Atsuhiko Tamura |

== Records and achievements ==
- At the JGP Thailand, Yanhao Li was the first skater from New Zealand and the first skater from Oceania to win an ISU Grand Prix medal (a bronze medal) at either the junior or senior level in men's single skating. He also won New Zealand's first ISU Grand Prix medal at either the junior or senior level in any discipline.
- At the JGP Austria, Adam Hagara won Slovakia's first ISU Grand Prix gold medal at either the junior or senior level in any discipline.
- At the JGP Turkey, Anastasia Metelkina and Luka Berulava were the first Georgian pairs team to win an ISU Grand Prix gold medal at either the junior or senior level.
- At the JGP Turkey, Gina Zehnder and Beda Leon Sieber were the first Swiss ice dance team to win an ISU Grand Prix medal (a bronze medal) at either the junior or senior level.

== Top scores ==
=== Men's singles ===
Top 10 best scores in the men's combined total
| No. | Skater | Nation | Score | Event |
|---|---|---|---|---|
| 1 | Seo Min-kyu | South Korea | 231.30 | 2023 JGP Turkey |
| 2 | Rio Nakata | Japan | 222.35 | 2023 JGP Turkey |
| 3 | Kim Hyun-gyeom | South Korea | 222.15 | 2023 JGP Hungary |
| 4 | Lim Ju-heon | South Korea | 221.55 | 2023 JGP Poland |
| 5 | Adam Hagara | Slovakia | 220.33 | 2023 JGP Austria |
| 6 | Daniel Martynov | United States | 220.09 | 2023 JGP Armenia |
| 7 | François Pitot | France | 219.86 | 2023 JGP Japan |
| 8 | Shunsuke Nakamura | Japan | 214.67 | 2023 JGP Armenia |
| 9 | Beck Strommer | United States | 210.92 | 2023 JGP Austria |
| 10 | Yanhao Li | New Zealand | 210.08 | 2023 JGP Thailand |

Top 10 best scores in the men's short program
| No. | Skater | Nation | Score | Event |
|---|---|---|---|---|
| 1 | Daniel Martynov | United States | 79.24 | 2023 JGP Armenia |
| 2 | Jacob Sanchez | United States | 77.69 | 2023 JGP Thailand |
| 3 | Shunsuke Nakamura | Japan | 77.30 | 2023 JGP Armenia |
| 4 | Kim Hyun-gyeom | South Korea | 77.01 | 2023–24 JGP Final |
| 5 | François Pitot | France | 76.52 | 2023 JGP Thailand |
| 6 | Daiya Ebihara | Japan | 76.10 | 2023 JGP Turkey |
| 7 | Lim Ju-heon | South Korea | 76.08 | 2023 JGP Poland |
| 8 | Seo Min-kyu | South Korea | 75.67 | 2023 JGP Turkey |
| 9 | Rio Nakata | Japan | 75.28 | 2023 JGP Thailand |
| 10 | Adam Hagara | Slovakia | 74.94 | 2023 JGP Hungary |

Top 10 best scores in the men's free skating
| No. | Skater | Nation | Score | Event |
|---|---|---|---|---|
| 1 | Seo Min-kyu | South Korea | 155.63 | 2023 JGP Turkey |
| 2 | Kim Hyun-gyeom | South Korea | 149.54 | 2023 JGP Hungary |
| 3 | Rio Nakata | Japan | 148.80 | 2023 JGP Turkey |
| 4 | François Pitot | France | 148.37 | 2023 JGP Japan |
| 5 | Adam Hagara | Slovakia | 146.32 | 2023 JGP Austria |
| 6 | Lim Ju-heon | South Korea | 145.47 | 2023 JGP Poland |
| 7 | Beck Strommer | United States | 140.94 | 2023 JGP Austria |
| 8 | Daniel Martynov | United States | 140.85 | 2023 JGP Armenia |
| 9 | Michael Xie | United States | 140.51 | 2023 JGP Japan |
| 10 | Fedir Kulish | Latvia | 140.00 | 2023 JGP Armenia |

=== Women's singles ===
Top 10 best scores in the women's combined total
| No. | Skater | Nation | Score | Event |
|---|---|---|---|---|
| 1 | Mao Shimada | Japan | 213.86 | 2023 JGP Japan |
| 2 | Shin Ji-a | South Korea | 201.33 | 2023 JGP Austria |
| 3 | Rena Uezono | Japan | 196.46 | 2023–24 JGP Final |
| 4 | Ami Nakai | Japan | 194.65 | 2023 JGP Turkey |
| 5 | Kim Yu-seong | South Korea | 190.48 | 2023–24 JGP Final |
| 6 | Yo Takagi | Japan | 188.15 | 2023 JGP Japan |
| 7 | Kim Yu-jae | South Korea | 183.65 | 2023 JGP Turkey |
| 8 | Kwon Min-sol | South Korea | 183.52 | 2023 JGP Poland |
| 9 | Elyce Lin-Gracey | United States | 179.16 | 2023 JGP Turkey |
| 10 | Tsai Yu-Feng | Chinese Taipei | 178.82 | 2023 JGP Japan |

Top 10 best scores in the women's short program
| No. | Skater | Nation | Score | Event |
|---|---|---|---|---|
| 1 | Mao Shimada | Japan | 73.78 | 2023 JGP Japan |
| 2 | Shin Ji-a | South Korea | 70.38 | 2023 JGP Austria |
| 3 | Youn Seo-jin | South Korea | 68.96 | 2023 JGP Poland |
| 4 | Rena Uezono | Japan | 67.87 | 2023–24 JGP Final |
| 5 | Ami Nakai | Japan | 67.49 | 2023 JGP Thailand |
| 6 | Kim Yu-jae | South Korea | 65.33 | 2023 JGP Turkey |
| 7 | Elyce Lin-Gracey | United States | 64.50 | 2023 JGP Armenia |
| 8 | Kwon Min-sol | South Korea | 64.00 | 2023 JGP Poland |
| 9 | Yo Takagi | Japan | 63.42 | 2023 JGP Japan |
| 10 | Kim Yu-seong | South Korea | 63.04 | 2023 JGP Thailand |

Top 10 best scores in the women's free skating
| No. | Skater | Nation | Score | Event |
|---|---|---|---|---|
| 1 | Mao Shimada | Japan | 140.08 | 2023 JGP Japan |
| 2 | Shin Ji-a | South Korea | 134.49 | 2023 JGP Hungary |
| 3 | Rena Uezono | Japan | 128.59 | 2023–24 JGP Final |
| 4 | Ami Nakai | Japan | 127.58 | 2023 JGP Turkey |
| 5 | Kim Yu-seong | South Korea | 127.77 | 2023–24 JGP Final |
| 6 | Yo Takagi | Japan | 124.73 | 2023 JGP Japan |
| 7 | Kwon Min-sol | South Korea | 120.94 | 2023–24 JGP Final |
| 8 | Elyce Lin-Gracey | United States | 119.41 | 2023 JGP Turkey |
| 9 | Han Hee-sue | South Korea | 118.70 | 2023 JGP Thailand |
| 10 | Anastasia Brandenburg | Switzerland | 118.36 | 2023 JGP Hungary |

=== Pairs ===
Top 10 best scores in the pairs' combined total
| No. | Team | Nation | Score | Event |
|---|---|---|---|---|
| 1 | Anastasia Metelkina / Luka Berulava | Georgia | 190.45 | 2023 JGP Hungary |
| 2 | Ava Kemp / Yohnatan Elizarov | Canada | 159.91 | 2023 JGP Poland |
| 3 | Martina Ariano Kent / Charly Laliberté Laurent | Canada | 158.28 | 2023 JGP Austria |
| 4 | Olivia Flores / Luke Wang | United States | 154.52 | 2023 JGP Turkey |
| 5 | Violetta Sierova / Ivan Khobta | Ukraine | 153.77 | 2023 JGP Hungary |
| 6 | Jazmine Desrochers / Kieran Thrasher | Canada | 146.34 | 2023 JGP Turkey |
| 7 | Louise Ehrhard / Mathis Pellegris | France | 132.50 | 2023 JGP Hungary |
| 8 | Irina Napolitano / Edoardo Comi | Italy | 131.75 | 2023 JGP Hungary |
| 9 | Yang Yixi / Deng Shunyang | China | 129.79 | 2023 JGP Poland |
| 10 | Debora Anna Cohen / Lukáš Vochozka | Czech Republic | 123.77 | 2023 JGP Poland |

Top 10 best scores in the pairs' short program
| No. | Team | Nation | Score | Event |
|---|---|---|---|---|
| 1 | Anastasia Metelkina / Luka Berulava | Georgia | 70.48 | 2023–24 JGP Final |
| 2 | Ava Kemp / Yohnatan Elizarov | Canada | 57.91 | 2023–24 JGP Final |
| 3 | Martina Ariano Kent / Charly Laliberté Laurent | Canada | 55.97 | 2023–24 JGP Final |
| 4 | Violetta Sierova / Ivan Khobta | Ukraine | 55.52 | 2023 JGP Hungary |
| 5 | Jazmine Desrochers / Kieran Thrasher | Canada | 55.24 | 2023 JGP Poland |
| 6 | Olivia Flores / Luke Wang | United States | 54.37 | 2023–24 JGP Final |
| 7 | Louise Ehrhard / Mathis Pellegris | France | 47.83 | 2023 JGP Turkey |
| 8 | Yang Yixi / Deng Shunyang | China | 46.03 | 2023 JGP Poland |
| 9 | Shi Wenning / Wang Zhiyu | China | 45.28 | 2023 JGP Austria |
| 10 | Irina Napolitano / Edoardo Comi | Italy | 44.45 | 2023 JGP Hungary |

Top 10 best scores in the pairs' free skating
| No. | Team | Nation | Score | Event |
|---|---|---|---|---|
| 1 | Anastasia Metelkina / Luka Berulava | Georgia | 120.51 | 2023 JGP Hungary |
| 2 | Ava Kemp / Yohnathan Elizarov | Canada | 105.66 | 2023 JGP Poland |
| 3 | Olivia Flores / Luke Wang | United States | 105.00 | 2023 JGP Turkey |
| 4 | Martina Ariano Kent / Charly Laliberté Laurent | Canada | 104.61 | 2023 JGP Austria |
| 5 | Violetta Sierova / Ivan Khobta | Ukraine | 98.25 | 2023 JGP Hungary |
| 6 | Jazmine Desrochers / Kieran Thrasher | Canada | 91.49 | 2023 JGP Turkey |
| 7 | Irina Napolitano / Edoardo Comi | Italy | 87.30 | 2023 JGP Hungary |
| 8 | Louise Ehrhard / Mathis Pellegris | France | 86.68 | 2023 JGP Hungary |
| 9 | Yang Yixi / Deng Shunyang | China | 83.76 | 2023 JGP Poland |
| 10 | Debora Anna Cohen / Lukáš Vochozka | Czech Republic | 79.74 | 2023 JGP Poland |

=== Ice dance ===
Top 10 season's best scores in the combined total (ice dance)
| No. | Team | Nation | Score | Event |
|---|---|---|---|---|
| 1 | Elizabeth Tkachenko / Alexei Kiliakov | Israel | 170.33 | 2023 JGP Armenia |
| 2 | Leah Neset / Artem Markelov | United States | 168.47 | 2023 JGP Thailand |
| 3 | Darya Grimm / Michail Savitskiy | Germany | 155.88 | 2023 JGP Poland |
| 4 | Elliana Peal / Ethan Peal | United States | 155.83 | 2023 JGP Armenia |
| 5 | Mariia Pinchuk / Mykyta Pogorielov | Ukraine | 154.43 | 2023 JGP Poland |
| 6 | Célina Fradji / Jean-Hans Fourneaux | France | 151.13 | 2023 JGP Japan |
| 7 | Sara Kishimoto / Atsuhiko Tamura | Japan | 150.85 | 2023 JGP Poland |
| 8 | Iryna Pidgaina / Artem Koval | Ukraine | 149.42 | 2023 JGP Hungary |
| 9 | Gina Zehnder / Beda Leon Sieber | Switzerland | 148.57 | 2023 JGP Poland |
| 10 | Yahli Pedersen / Jeffrey Chen | United States | 146.37 | 2023 JGP Turkey |

Top 10 season's best scores in the rhythm dance
| No. | Team | Nation | Score | Event |
|---|---|---|---|---|
| 1 | Leah Neset / Artem Markelov | United States | 72.48 | 2023–24 JGP Final |
| 2 | Elizabeth Tkachenko / Alexei Kiliakov | Israel | 68.52 | 2023 JGP Armenia |
| 3 | Darya Grimm / Michail Savitskiy | Germany | 66.49 | 2023–24 JGP Final |
| 4 | Yahli Pedersen / Jeffrey Chen | United States | 64.90 | 2023 JGP Hungary |
| 5 | Elliana Peal / Ethan Peal | United States | 62.52 | 2023 JGP Armenia |
| 6 | Mariia Pinchuk / Mykyta Pogorielov | Ukraine | 62.23 | 2023 JGP Poland |
| 7 | Iryna Pidgaina / Artem Koval | Ukraine | 61.77 | 2023 JGP Hungary |
| 8 | Célina Fradji / Jean-Hans Fourneaux | France | 61.60 | 2023–24 JGP Final |
| 9 | Sara Kishimoto / Atsuhiko Tamura | Japan | 59.74 | 2023 JGP Poland |
| 10 | Gina Zehnder / Beda Leon Sieber | Switzerland | 59.65 | 2023 JGP Poland |

Top 10 season's best scores in the free dance
| No. | Team | Nation | Score | Event |
|---|---|---|---|---|
| 1 | Elizabeth Tkachenko / Alexei Kiliakov | Israel | 101.81 | 2023 JGP Armenia |
| 2 | Leah Neset / Artem Markelov | United States | 100.14 | 2023 JGP Japan |
| 3 | Elliana Peal / Ethan Peal | United States | 93.31 | 2023 JGP Armenia |
| 4 | Noemi Maria Tali / Noah Lafornara | Italy | 93.25 | 2023 JGP Armenia |
| 5 | Mariia Pinchuk / Mykyta Pogorielov | Ukraine | 92.20 | 2023 JGP Poland |
| 6 | Darya Grimm / Michail Savitskiy | Germany | 91.68 | 2023 JGP Austria |
| 7 | Sara Kishimoto / Atsuhiko Tamura | Japan | 91.11 | 2023 JGP Poland |
| 8 | Célina Fradji / Jean-Hans Fourneaux | France | 89.87 | 2023 JGP Thailand |
| 9 | Gina Zehnder / Beda Leon Sieber | Switzerland | 88.92 | 2023 JGP Poland |
| 10 | Caroline Mullen / Brendan Mullen | United States | 88.68 | 2023 JGP Japan |
