= 2025 CS Golden Spin of Zagreb =

Figure skating competition

2025 Golden Spin of Zagreb
- Type: ISU Challenger Series
- Date: 3 – 6 December
- Season: 2025–26
- Location: Zagreb, Croatia
- Host: Croatian Skating Federation
- Venue: Klizalište Velesajem

Champions
- Men's singles: (France) Kévin Aymoz
- Women's singles: (United States) Bradie Tennell
- Pairs: (United States) Audrey Shin and Balázs Nagy
- Ice dance: (Italy) Charlène Guignard and Marco Fabbri
- Previous: 2024 CS Golden Spin of Zagreb
- Next: 2026 CS Golden Spin of Zagreb
- Previous CS: 2025 CS Tallinn Trophy

The 2025 Golden Spin of Zagreb (Croatian: Zlatna pirueta Zagreba) is a figure skating competition sanctioned by the International Skating Union (ISU), organized and hosted by the Croatian Skating Federation (Croatian: Hrvatski klizački savez), and the eleventh event of the 2025–26 ISU Challenger Series. It was held at the Klizalište Velesajem in Zagreb, Croatia, from 3 to 6 December 2025. Medals were awarded in men's singles, women's singles, pair skating, and ice dance, and skaters earned ISU World Standing points based on their results. Kévin Aymoz of France won the men's event, Bradie Tennell of the United States won the women's event, Audrey Shin and Balázs Nagy of the United States won the pairs event, and Charlène Guignard and Marco Fabbri of Italy won the ice dance event.

== Background ==
The first installment of the Golden Spin of Zagreb – originally called the Zagreb International Figure Skating Championship (Croatian: Međunarodno prvenstvo Zagreba u umjetničkom klizanju) – was held in 1967 in Zagreb, in what was at the time Yugoslavia. The competition continued as a Croatian event after Croatia's independence from Yugoslavia in 1991. The ISU Challenger Series was introduced in 2014. It is a series of international figure skating competitions sanctioned by the International Skating Union (ISU) and organized by ISU member nations. The objective was to ensure consistent organization and structure within a series of international competitions linked together, providing opportunities for senior-level skaters to compete at the international level and also earn ISU World Standing points. The Golden Spin of Zagreb was one of the competitions in the 2014 inaugural season, and in 2016, it was identified as one of a "core group" of Challenger Series events in recognition of its long-standing tradition. It has been a Challenger Series event every year since the series' inception, except for 2020, when it was cancelled due to the COVID-19 pandemic. The 2025–26 Challenger Series consisted of eleven events, of which the Golden Spin of Zagreb was the eleventh.

The International Skating Union published the preliminary list of entrants on 12 November 2025.

== Required performance elements ==
=== Single skating ===
Men and women competing in single skating first performed their short programs on Thursday, 4 December. Lasting no more than 2 minutes 40 seconds, the short program had to include the following elements:

For men: one double or triple Axel; one triple or quadruple jump; one jump combination consisting of a double jump and a triple jump, two triple jumps, or a quadruple jump and a double jump or triple jump; one flying spin; one camel spin or sit spin with a change of foot; one spin combination with a change of foot; and a step sequence using the full ice surface.

For women: one double or triple Axel; one triple jump; one jump combination consisting of a double jump and a triple jump, or two triple jumps; one flying spin; one layback spin, sideways leaning spin, camel spin, or sit spin without a change of foot; one spin combination with a change of foot; and one step sequence using the full ice surface.

Women performed their free skates on Friday, 5 December, while men performed theirs on Saturday, 6 December. The free skate performance for both men and women could last no more than 4 minutes, and had to include the following: seven jump elements, of which one had to be an Axel-type jump; three spins, of which one had to be a spin combination, one had to be a flying spin, and one had to be a spin with only one position; a step sequence; and a choreographic sequence.

=== Pairs ===
Couples competing in pair skating first performed their short programs on Friday, 5 December. Lasting no more than 2 minutes 40 seconds, the short program has to include the following elements: one pair lift, one double or triple twist lift, one double or triple throw jump, one double or triple solo jump, one solo spin combination with a change of foot, one death spiral, and a step sequence using the full ice surface.

Couples performed their free skates on Saturday, 6 December. The free skate performance can last no more than 4 minutes, and has to include the following: three pair lifts, of which one has to be a twist lift; two different throw jumps; one solo jump; one jump combination or sequence; one pair spin combination; one death spiral; and a choreographic sequence.

=== Ice dance ===
Couples competing in ice dance performed their rhythm dances on Thursday, 4 December. Lasting no more than 2 minutes 50 seconds, the theme of the rhythm dance this season was "music, dance styles, and feeling of the 1990s". Examples of applicable dance styles and music included, but were not limited to: pop, Latin, house, techno, hip-hop, and grunge. The rhythm dance had to include the following elements: one pattern dance step sequence, one choreographic rhythm sequence, one dance lift, one set of sequential twizzles, and one step sequence.

Couples then performed their free dances on Friday, 5 December. The free dance performance could last no longer than 4 minutes, and had to include the following: three dance lifts, one dance spin, one set of synchronized twizzles, one step sequence in hold, one step sequence while on one skate and not touching, and three choreographic elements.

== Judging ==
Skaters were judged according to the required technical elements of their program (such as jumps and spins), as well as the overall presentation of their program, based on three program components (skating skills, presentation, and composition). Each technical element in a figure skating performance was assigned a predetermined base point value and scored by a panel of nine judges on a scale from −5 to +5 based on the quality of its execution. Each Grade of Execution (GOE) from –5 to +5 was assigned a value as indicated on the Scale of Values. For example, a triple Axel was worth a base value of 8.00 points, and a GOE of +3 was worth 2.40 points, so a triple Axel with a GOE of +3 earned 10.40 points. The judging panel's GOE for each element was determined by calculating the trimmed mean (the average after discarding the highest and lowest scores). The panel's scores for all elements were added together to generate a Total Elements Score. At the same time, the judges evaluated each performance based on the five aforementioned program components and assigned each a score from 0.25 to 10 in 0.25-point increments. The judging panel's final score for each program component was also determined by calculating the trimmed mean. Those scores were then multiplied by the factor shown on the chart below; the results were added together to generate a total Program Component Score.

Program component factoring
Discipline	Short program or Rhythm dance	Free skate or Free dance
Men	1.67	3.33
Women	1.33	2.67
Pairs	1.33	2.67
Ice dance	1.33	2.00

Deductions were applied for certain violations, such as time infractions, stops and restarts, or falls. The Total Elements Score and Program Component Score were then added together, minus any deductions, to generate a final performance score for each skater or team.

== Medal summary ==
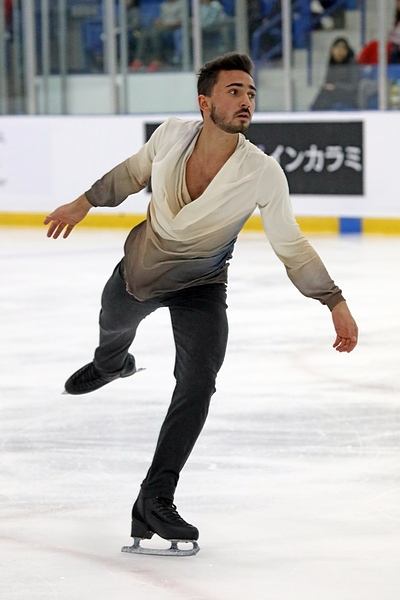
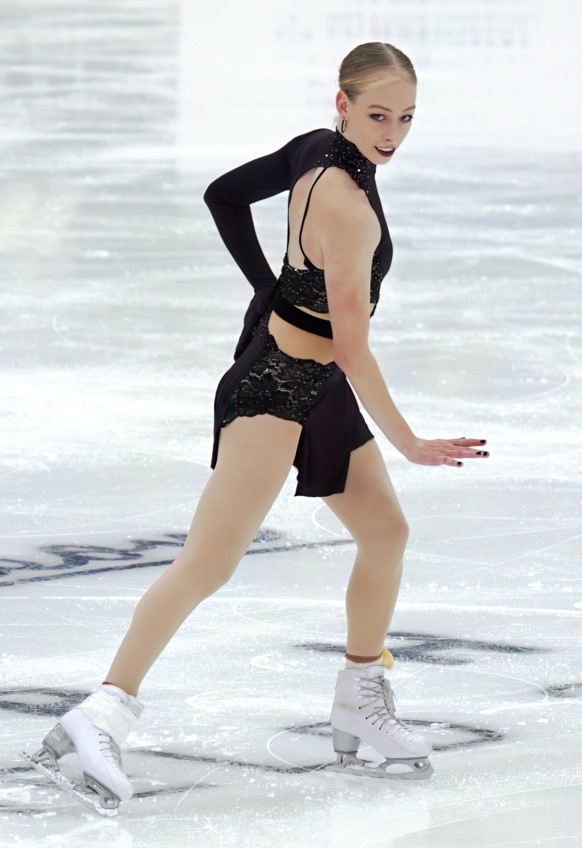
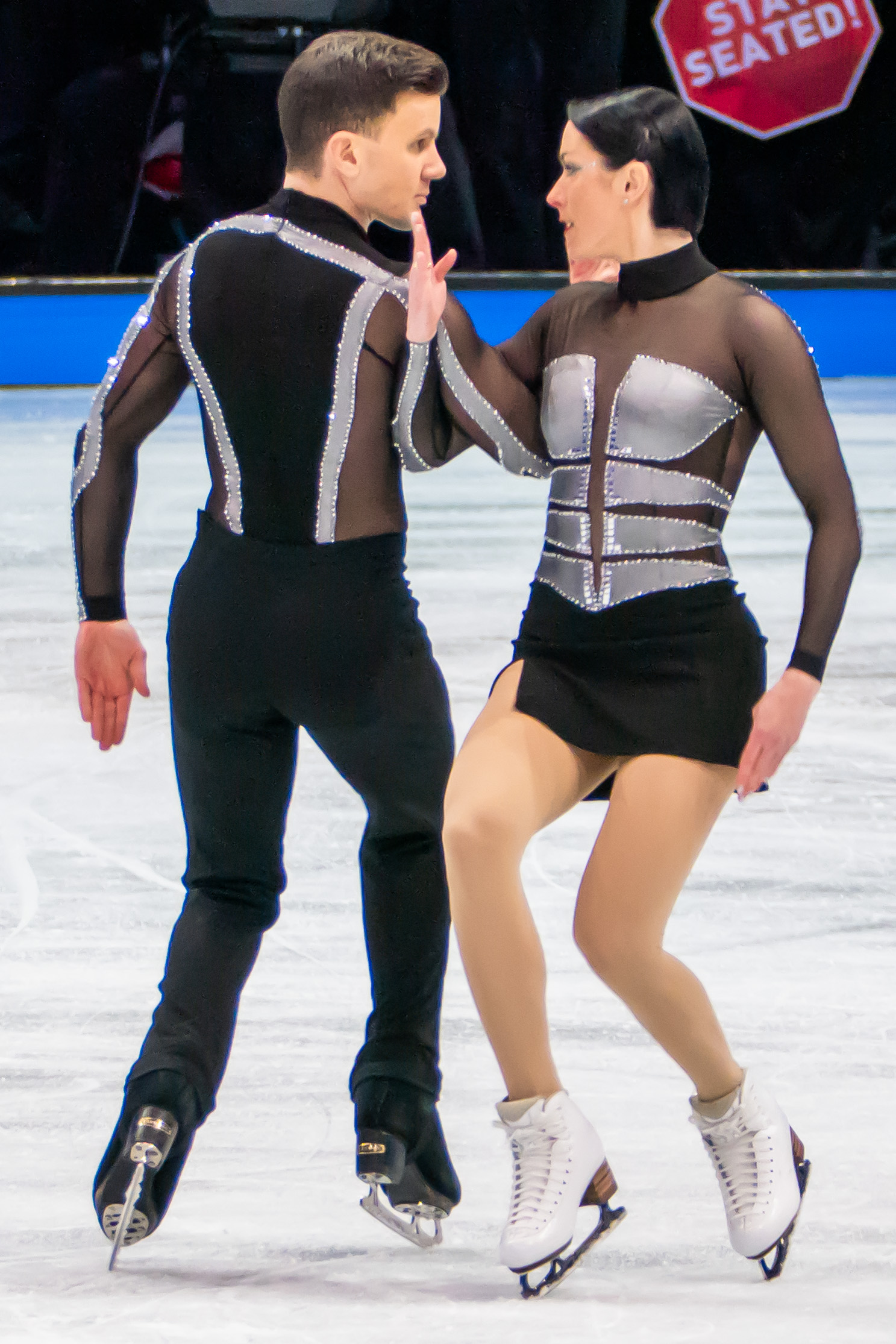
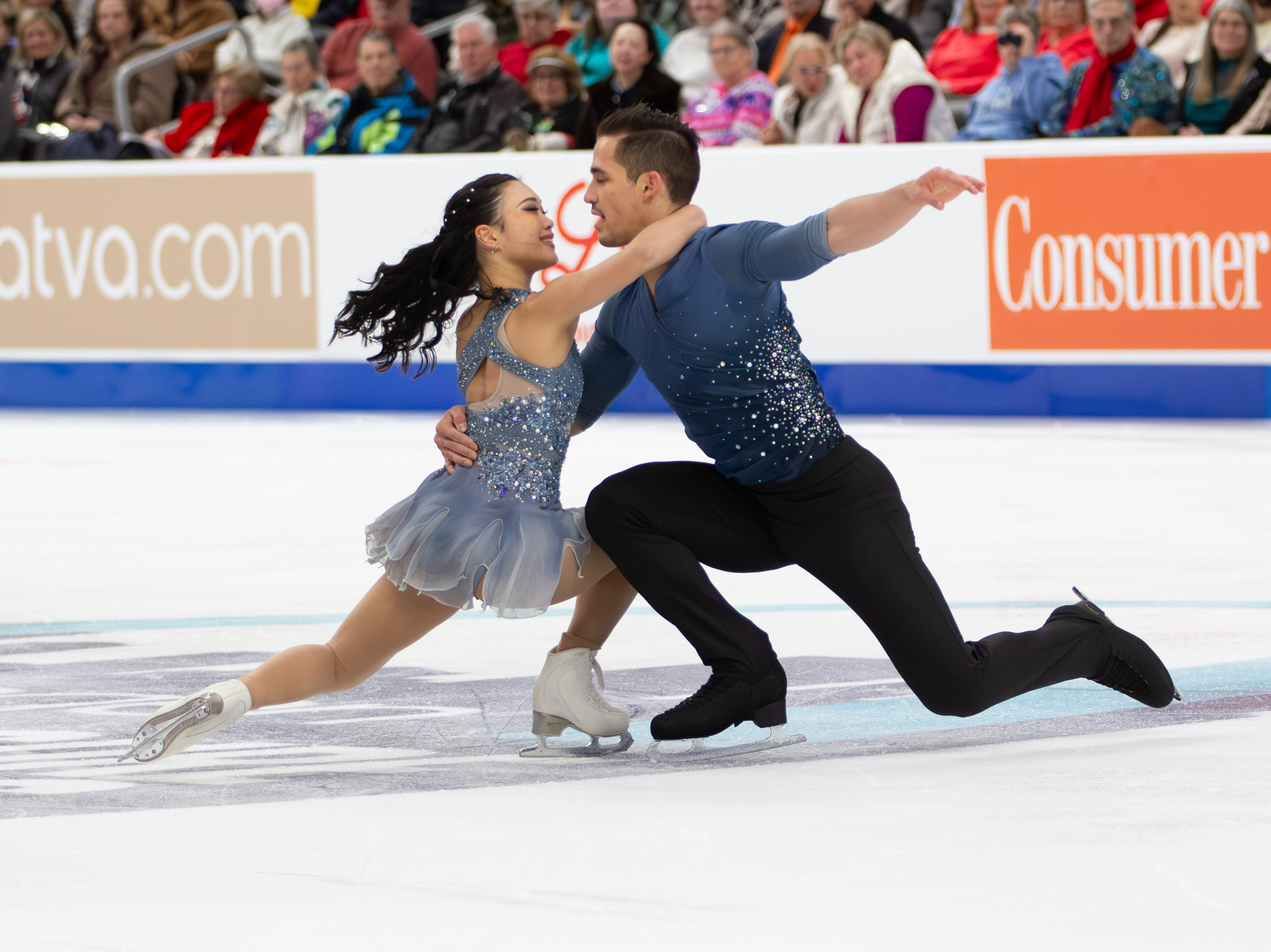
The 2025 Golden Spin of Zagreb champions: Kévin Aymoz of France (men's singles); Bradie Tennell of the United States (women's singles); Charlène Guignard and Marco Fabbri of Italy (ice dance); and Audrey Shin and Balázs Nagy of the United States (pair skating)

Medalists
Discipline	Gold	Silver	Bronze
Men	(France) Kévin Aymoz	(Estonia) Arlet Levandi	(France) Luc Economides
Women	(United States) Bradie Tennell	(Finland) Iida Karhunen	(Kazakhstan) Sofia Samodelkina
Pairs	(United States); Audrey Shin; Balázs Nagy	(United States); Valentina Plazas; Maximiliano Fernandez	(Switzerland); Oxana Vouillamoz; Tom Bouvart
Ice dance	(Italy); Charlène Guignard; Marco Fabbri	(France); Loïcia Demougeot; Théo le Mercier	(Czech Republic); Kateřina Mrázková; Daniel Mrázek

== Results ==
=== Men's singles ===
Men's results
Rank	Skater	Nation	Total points	SP		FS	
1st place, gold medalist(s)	Kévin Aymoz	France	239.52	1	87.52	1	152.00
2nd place, silver medalist(s)	Arlet Levandi	Estonia	226.88	9	75.46	2	151.42
3rd place, bronze medalist(s)	Luc Economides	France	219.60	4	78.80	4	140.80
4	Deniss Vasiļjevs	Latvia	219.57	3	79.00	5	140.57
5	Jacob Sanchez	United States	216.59	10	75.31	3	141.28
6	Daniel Martynov	United States	216.34	2	84.06	9	132.28
7	Jari Kessler	Croatia	214.45	8	75.56	6	138.89
8	Ivan Shmuratko	Ukraine	209.07	6	77.36	10	131.71
9	François Pitot	France	208.73	11	73.35	8	135.38
10	Corey Circelli	Italy	206.39	14	70.70	7	135.69
11	Georgii Reshtenko	Czech Republic	201.27	12	71.74	11	129.53
12	Mihhail Selevko	Estonia	199.25	7	76.45	16	122.80
13	Matias Lindfors	Finland	194.14	13	70.85	14	123.29
14	Nico Steffen	Switzerland	192.59	18	63.31	12	129.28
15	Tamir Kuperman	Israel	192.46	5	78.08	17	114.38
16	Davide Lewton Brain	Monaco	189.80	15	66.99	15	122.81
17	Alp Eren Özkan	Turkey	189.06	20	59.85	13	129.21
18	Lev Vinokur	Israel	178.96	16	66.52	18	112.44
19	Jakub Lofek	Poland	174.64	17	63.71	20	110.93
20	Valtter Virtanen	Finland	171.45	19	60.28	19	111.17
21	David Sedej	Slovenia	156.72	21	55.78	21	100.94
22	Dillon Judge	Ireland	128.31	22	47.91	22	80.40

=== Women's singles ===
Women's results
Rank	Skater	Nation	Total points	SP		FS	
1st place, gold medalist(s)	Bradie Tennell	United States	194.97	1	62.80	1	132.17
2nd place, silver medalist(s)	Iida Karhunen	Finland	187.05	4	60.12	2	126.93
3rd place, bronze medalist(s)	Sofia Samodelkina	Kazakhstan	182.63	7	56.28	3	126.35
4	Marina Piredda	Italy	178.94	6	59.31	4	119.63
5	Elyce Lin-Gracey	United States	175.80	5	59.84	5	115.96
6	Léa Serna	France	171.93	3	60.75	7	111.18
7	Nina Pinzarrone	Belgium	167.41	2	61.30	9	106.11
8	Stefania Yakovleva	Cyprus	167.18	10	55.94	6	111.24
9	Lorine Schild	France	162.96	9	55.97	8	106.99
10	Nataly Langerbaur	Estonia	157.60	11	53.94	10	103.66
11	Ava Marie Ziegler	United States	150.98	12	51.83	13	99.15
12	Elizabet Gervits	Israel	150.83	13	51.69	14	99.14
13	Anastasia Gracheva	Moldova	149.68	17	49.09	11	100.59
14	Niki Wories	Netherlands	142.68	16	49.86	15	92.82
15	Meda Variakojytė	Lithuania	142.03	25	42.31	12	99.72
16	Marilena Kitromilis	Cyprus	141.03	14	51.13	17	89.90
17	Nargiz Süleymanova	Azerbaijan	138.96	8	56.07	20	82.89
18	Aleksandra Golovkina-Dolinske	Lithuania	137.97	20	48.31	18	89.66
19	Julia Grabowski	Germany	134.48	21	47.45	19	87.03
20	Alexandra Feigin	Bulgaria	132.35	26	41.78	16	90.57
21	Olesja Leonova	Estonia	130.95	15	51.02	22	79.93
22	Sarah Marie Pesch	Germany	129.27	18	48.59	21	80.68
23	Jogailė Aglinskytė	Lithuania	128.34	19	48.54	23	79.80
24	Taisiia Spesivtseva	Ukraine	117.12	22	47.02	27	70.10
25	Ana Scepanović	Serbia	116.82	23	43.61	24	73.21
26	Marietta Atkins	Poland	114.89	24	43.21	25	71.68
27	Salma Agamova	Turkey	111.95	27	41.73	26	70.22
28	Jolanda Vos	Netherlands	106.67	28	39.97	28	66.70
29	Meri Marinac	Croatia	87.77	29	34.75	30	53.02
30	Julia Fennell	Israel	82.54	30	28.50	29	54.04

=== Pairs ===
Pairs results
Rank	Team	Nation	Total points	SP		FS	
1st place, gold medalist(s)	Audrey Shin; Balázs Nagy	United States	194.00	1	66.03	1	127.97
2nd place, silver medalist(s)	Valentina Plazas; Maximiliano Fernandez	United States	183.17	4	61.17	2	122.00
3rd place, bronze medalist(s)	Oxana Vouillamoz; Tom Bouvart	Switzerland	177.61	2	64.36	4	113.25
4	Aurélie Faula; Théo Belle	France	175.14	5	60.94	3	114.20
5	Anna Valesi; Martin Bidař	Czech Republic	168.52	7	58.42	5	110.10
6	Irma Caldara; Riccardo Maglio	Italy	168.25	3	61.20	6	107.05
7	Chelsea Liu; Ryan Bedard	United States	163.88	8	57.79	7	106.09
8	Daria Danilova; Michel Tsiba	Netherlands	160.38	6	60.07	10	100.31
9	Sophia Schaller; Livio Mayr	Austria	157.90	9	56.96	9	100.94
10	Megan Wessenberg; Denys Strekalin	France	154.86	11	50.70	8	104.16
11	Letizia Roscher; Luis Schuster	Germany	152.15	10	55.82	12	96.33
12	Sofiia Holichenko; Artem Darenskyi	Ukraine	148.00	13	48.20	11	99.80
13	Isabella Gamez; Aleksandr Korovin	Philippines	137.39	15	42.61	13	94.78
14	Neamh Davison; Daniel Borisov	Great Britain	130.42	14	45.66	14	84.76
15	Julia Mauder; Johannes Wilkinson	South Africa	121.49	16	41.97	15	79.52
WD	Anastasia Golubeva; Hektor Giotopoulos Moore	Australia	Withdrew	12	49.01	Withdrew from competition	

=== Ice dance ===
Ice dance results
Rank	Team	Nation	Total points	RD		FD	
1st place, gold medalist(s)	Charlène Guignard; Marco Fabbri	Italy	204.18	1	83.06	1	121.12
2nd place, silver medalist(s)	Loïcia Demougeot; Théo le Mercier	France	187.84	3	75.77	2	112.07
3rd place, bronze medalist(s)	Kateřina Mrázková; Daniel Mrázek	Czech Republic	184.18	2	77.29	4	106.89
4	Oona Brown; Gage Brown	United States	180.30	4	70.01	3	110.29
5	Leah Neset; Artem Markelov	United States	168.58	8	63.85	5	104.73
6	Shira Ichilov; Mikhail Nosovitskiy	Israel	166.39	7	64.11	6	102.28
7	Angelina Kudryavtseva; Ilia Karankevich	Cyprus	165.13	5	66.97	8	98.16
8	Célina Fradji; Jean-Hans Fourneaux	France	162.91	6	65.69	9	97.22
9	Noemi Maria Tali; Noah Lafornara	Italy	159.23	13	57.95	7	101.28
10	Maria Kazakova; Vladislav Kasinskij	Georgia	156.08	9	61.37	10	94.71
11	Louise Bordet; Martin Chardain	France	153.58	11	59.27	11	94.31
12	Mariia Pinchuk; Mykyta Pogorielov	Ukraine	149.53	10	60.9	13	88.63
13	Ikura Kushida; Koshiro Shimada	Japan	148.62	12	59.19	12	89.43
14	Xiao Zixi; He Linghao	China	142.30	15	56.39	15	85.91
15	Denisa Cimlová; Stefano Frasca	Italy	141.14	14	57.42	17	83.72
16	Gina Zehnder; Beda Leon Sieber	Switzerland	140.02	16	53.78	14	86.24
17	Lin Yufei; Gao Zijian	China	138.01	17	53.46	16	84.55
18	Chelsea Verhaegh; Sherim van Geffen	Netherlands	132.22	19	50.86	18	81.36
19	Natalia Pallu-Neves; Jayin Panesar	Brazil	131.09	18	51.29	19	79.80
20	Olexandra Borysova; Aaron Freeman	Poland	112.26	20	40.59	20	71.67

== Works cited ==
- "Special Regulations & Technical Rules – Single & Pair Skating and Ice Dance 2024" (PDF). International Skating Union. Archived (PDF) from the original on 3 June 2025.
