= Mariia Pinchuk =

Ukrainian ice dancer (born 2006)

Personal information
- Native name: Марія Пінчук
- Other names: Maria, Mariya
- Born: 7 April 2006 (age 20) Kharkiv, Ukraine
- Height: 1.65 m (5 ft 5 in)

Figure skating career
- Country: Ukraine
- Discipline: Ice dance
- Partner: Mykyta Pogorielov
- Coach: Matteo Zanni; Barbora Řezníčková; Katharina Müller; Mattia Dalla Torre; Francesko Corazza; Evgeniya Kozhukhanova
- Skating club: Kolos

Mariia Pavlivna Pinchuk (Ukrainian: Марія Павлівна Пінчук, born 7 April 2006) is a Ukrainian ice dancer. With her skating partner, Mykyta Pogorielov, she is the 2023 CS Denis Ten Memorial bronze medalist, a three-time ISU Junior Grand Prix medalist (including gold at the 2023 JGP Turkey), a two-time Ukrainian junior national champion (2021, 2022), and competed in the final segment at two World Junior Championships.

== Personal life ==
Pinchuk was born on 7 April 2006 in Kharkiv, Ukraine. Pinchuk and her mother fled Kharkiv during the Russian invasion of Ukraine and have lived in Austria since mid-March 2022. Her father, sister, and grandparents remained in Ukraine.

== Career ==
=== Early years ===
Pinchuk and Pogorielov made their international junior debut in the 2020–21 season which, as a result of the COVID-19 pandemic, featured few events, in particular for junior skaters. Despite this, they won three silver medals at smaller events held in Europe, most notably the Budapest Trophy. They won both the national novice and junior titles.

=== 2021–22 season: War refugees ===
Pinchuk and Pogorielov made their Junior Grand Prix debut, coming ninth at the 2022 JGP Slovakia and sixth at the 2022 JGP Poland. They won their first international gold medal at the Open d'Andorra, and silver medals at both the Santa Claus Cup and the Victor Petrenko Cup, collecting their second Ukrainian junior title as well.

Pinchuk and Pogorielov's plans for the second half of the season were derailed by the Russian invasion of Ukraine, which made their home city of Kharkiv the site of one of the largest and most protracted early battles. Pinchuk and her mother evacuated to Vienna, accompanied by coach Galina Churilova and Pogorielov, whose family had largely relocated to Spain. Despite these disruptions, the team was able to attend the 2022 World Junior Championships, which had been delayed and moved to Tallinn as a result of the invasion, with all Russian and Belarusian skaters banned from participating. Pinchuk/Pogorielov finished in seventeenth place in their ISU championship debut.

=== 2022–23 season: First Junior Grand Prix medal and senior debut ===
With their regular choreographer Larisa Fiodorova still in Kharkiv and unable to leave, Pinchuk and Pogorielov received assistance in preparing their new programs from retired Ukrainian senior champions Oleksandra Nazarova and Maksym Nikitin. In their second season on the Junior Grand Prix, they won the bronze medal at the 2022 JGP Latvia. In their second event, the 2022 JGP Poland, they finished fourth.

Opting to make their international senior debut, Pinchuk and Pogorielov won a silver medal at the Bosphorus Cup and bronze at the Pavel Roman Memorial. They were sent to represent Ukraine at the 2023 European Championships, qualifying to the free dance and finishing fifteenth. Pinchuk and Pogorielov then appeared at their second World Junior Championships, finishing in twelfth place.

=== 2023–24 season: Junior Grand Prix gold ===
Starting their season again on the Junior Grand Prix, Pinchuk and Pogorielov finished second in the rhythm dance at the 2023 JGP Turkey, but rose to first place after the free dance despite being second in that segment as well, winning the gold medal. This was the first Junior Grand Prix title for a Ukrainian dance team since Nosulia and Kholoniuk's victory on the 2011 circuit. Pinchuk assessed that "when you set a goal like this you have so many emotions and so many things to say but now I don't know what to say." At their second event, the 2023 JGP Poland, they won the silver medal, including a first-place finish in the free dance. Their results qualified them to the Junior Grand Prix Final.

Pinchuk and Pogorielov then competed at senior level events, winning bronze at the 2023 Denis Ten Memorial Challenge and gold at the 2023 Pavel Roman Memorial.

In December, the duo finished fifth at the Junior Grand Prix Final, which they announced would be their last appearance at the junior level.

Selected to compete at the 2024 European Championships in Kaunas, Lithuania, Pinchuk and Pogorielov finished in eighteenth place.

=== 2024–25 season ===
Beginning their season by competing on the 2024–25 ISU Challenger Series, Pinchuk/Pogorielov finished ninth at the 2024 Nebelhorn Trophy, twelfth at the 2024 Budapest Trophy, and tenth at the 2024 Nepela Memorial. Going on to make their senior Grand Prix debut, the team finished tenth at the 2024 Finlandia Trophy. They subsequently competed at the 2024 Santa Claus Cup and the 2024 Sofia Trophy, where they finished fourth and fifth, respectively.

In January, Pinchuk/Pogorielov finished fourth at the 2025 Winter World University Games. They then closed the season with a twentieth-place finish at the 2025 European Championships in Tallinn, Estonia.

=== 2025–26 season: World Championships debut ===
Pinchuk/Pogorielov began their season at the 2025 CS Lombardia Trophy, where they finished 11th. At the Skate to Milano, Pinchuk/Pogorielov failed to qualify for the 2026 Winter Olympics after finishing 12th, missing out on earning one of the four available quotas.

In March, Pinchuk/Pogorielov made their World Championships debut at the 2026 World Championships. Pinchuk/Pogorielov finished in 27th, failing to make the free skate.

== Programs ==
=== Ice dance with Mykyta Pogorielov ===
Season	Rhythm dance	Free dance
2025–26	Queen of the Night by Whitney Houston; Jusagroove by Chic; Strike It Up by Black Box choreo. by Matteo Zanni	Ferrari; Piu' veloce; Preghiera; Armonie meccaniche; Valzer di Lina by Paolo Buonvino choreo. by Matteo Zanni
2024–25	Twist and Shout by The Top Notes performed by The Beatles; I'm a Believer (from Shrek the Musical) performed by The Shrek the Musical Cast; Only the Lonely by Roy Orbison & Joe Melson; Le Freak (Dimitri from Paris Remix) by Chic, Bernard Edwards, & Nile Rodgers choreo. by Galina Churilova, Matteo Zanni	Obscura by Power-Haus & Christian Reindl; Freya by Christian Reindl & Lucie Paradis; Lux by Power-Haus & Christian Reindl choreo. by Galina Churilova, Matteo Zanni
2023–24	Unchain My Heart performed by Joe Cocker; You Give Love a Bad Name by Bon Jovi choreo. by Larisa Fiodorova	Vogue; Frozen by Madonna choreo. by Larisa Fiodorova
2022–23	Tango Till They're Sore by Tom Waits performed by Madeleine Peyroux; Uccen (DWTS remix) by Taalbi Brothers choreo. by Larisa Fiodorova	Seven Nation Army performed by 2Cellos; You Don't Own Me performed by Saygrace, feat. G-Eazy choreo. by Larisa Fiodorova
2021–22	Blues: Your Heart is as Black as Night performed by Beth Hart and Joe Bonamassa; Swing: Brotherswing by Caravan Palace choreo. by Larisa Fiodorova	Beethoven's Last Night by the Trans-Siberian Orchestra choreo. by Larisa Fiodorova

== Competitive highlights ==
- GP – Event of the ISU Grand Prix Series
- JGP – Event of the ISU Junior Grand Prix Series
- CS – Event of the ISU Challenger Series
- TBD – Assigned
- WD – Withdrew from competition

=== Ice dance with Mykyta Pogorielov ===
Competition placements at senior level
Season	2022–23	2023–24	2024–25	2025–26
World Championships				27th
European Championships	15th	18th	20th	
GP Finland			10th	
CS Budapest Trophy			12th	
CS Denis Ten Memorial		3rd		
CS Golden Spin of Zagreb				12th
CS Lombardia Trophy				11th
CS Nebelhorn Trophy			9th	
CS Nepela Memorial			10th	
Bosphorus Cup	2nd			2nd
NRW Trophy				5th
Pavel Roman Memorial	3rd	1st		
Santa Claus Cup			4th	
Skate to Milano				12th
Sofia Trophy			5th	2nd
Winter University Games			4th	

Competition placements at junior level
Season	2020–21	2021–22	2022–23	2023–24
World Junior Championships		17th	12th	
Junior Grand Prix Final				5th
JGP Latvia			3rd	
JGP Poland		6th	4th	2nd
JGP Slovakia		9th		
JGP Turkey				1st
Budapest Trophy	2nd			
Ice Challenge		7th		
LuMi Dance Trophy	2nd			
Open d'Andorra		1st		
Santa Claus Cup		2nd		
Viktor Petrenko Cup		2nd		
Winter Star	2nd			

== Detailed results ==
=== Ice dance with Mykyta Pogorielov ===
ISU personal best scores in the +5/-5 GOE System
Segment	Type	Score	Event
Total	TSS	167.22	2023 CS Denis Ten Memorial Challenge
Rhythm dance	TSS	65.93	2024 CS Nepela Memorial
Rhythm dance	TES	37.33	2024 CS Nepela Memorial
Rhythm dance	PCS	28.79	2023 CS Denis Ten Memorial Challenge
Free dance	TSS	105.74	2023 CS Denis Ten Memorial Challenge
Free dance	TES	61.44	2023 CS Denis Ten Memorial Challenge
Free dance	PCS	44.86	2023 JGP Poland

==== Senior level ====
Results in the 2022-23 season
Date	Event	RD		FD		Total	
Date	Event	P	Score	P	Score	P	Score
Nov 10–13, 2022	(Czech Republic) 2022 Pavel Roman Memorial	4	58.45	3	97.66	3	156.11
Nov 29 – Dec 3, 2022	(Turkey) 2022 Bosphorus Cup	1	69.91	3	91.79	2	161.70
Jan 23–29, 2023	(Finland) 2023 European Championships	14	59.36	15	89.01	15	148.37

Results in the 2023–24 season
Date	Event	RD		FD		Total	
Date	Event	P	Score	P	Score	P	Score
Nov 2–5, 2023	(Kazakhstan) 2023 CS Denis Ten Memorial Challenge	6	61.48	3	105.74	3	167.22
Nov 10–12, 2023	(Czech Republic) 2023 Pavel Roman Memorial	1	64.62	1	98.02	1	162.64
Jan 8–14, 2024	(Lithuania) 2024 European Championships	17	61.42	18	92.16	18	153.58

Results in the 2024–25 season
Date	Event	RD		FD		Total	
Date	Event	P	Score	P	Score	P	Score
Sep 19–21, 2024	(Germany) 2024 CS Nebelhorn Trophy	8	63.04	10	96.49	9	159.53
Oct 11–13, 2024	(Hungary) 2024 CS Budapest Trophy	11	60.62	12	91.78	12	152.40
Oct 24-26, 2024	(Czech Republic) 2024 CS Nepela Memorial	9	65.93	10	96.35	10	162.28
Nov 15–17, 2024	(Finland) 2024 Finlandia Trophy	10	54.39	10	79.95	10	134.34
Nov 27 – Dec 2, 2024	(Hungary) 2024 Santa Claus Cup	3	64.86	5	100.13	4	164.99
Jan 7–12, 2025	(Bulgaria) 2025 Sofia Trophy	5	62.62	5	105.65	5	168.27
Jan 16–18, 2025	(Italy) 2025 Winter University Games	4	61.39	4	94.13	4	155.52
Jan 28 – Feb 2, 2025	(Estonia) 2025 European Championships	20	60.69	20	95.29	20	155.98

Results in the 2025-26 season
Date	Event	RD		FD		Total	
Date	Event	P	Score	P	Score	P	Score
Sep 11-14, 2025	(Italy) 2025 CS Lombardia Trophy	13	52.08	11	83.82	11	135.90
Sep 18-21, 2025	(China) 2025 ISU Skate to Milano	10	62.11	12	91.70	12	153.81
Nov 13-16, 2025	(Germany) 2025 NRW Trophy	5	63.00	5	95.49	5	158.49
Nov 19–23, 2025	(Poland) 2025 CS Warsaw Cup	15	63.90	13	102.86	13	166.76
Nov 24-30, 2025	(Turkey) 2025 Bosphorus Cup	2	66.13	2	106.59	2	172.72
Dec 3-6, 2025	(Croatia) 2025 CS Golden Spin of Zagreb	10	60.90	13	88.63	12	149.53
Jan 6-11, 2026	(Bulgaria) 2026 Sofia Trophy	2	68.88	2	108.05	2	175.93
Mar 24–29, 2026	(Czech Republic) 2026 World Championships	27	59.45	—N/a	—N/a	27	59.45
