= Daniel Martynov =

American figure skater (born 2006)

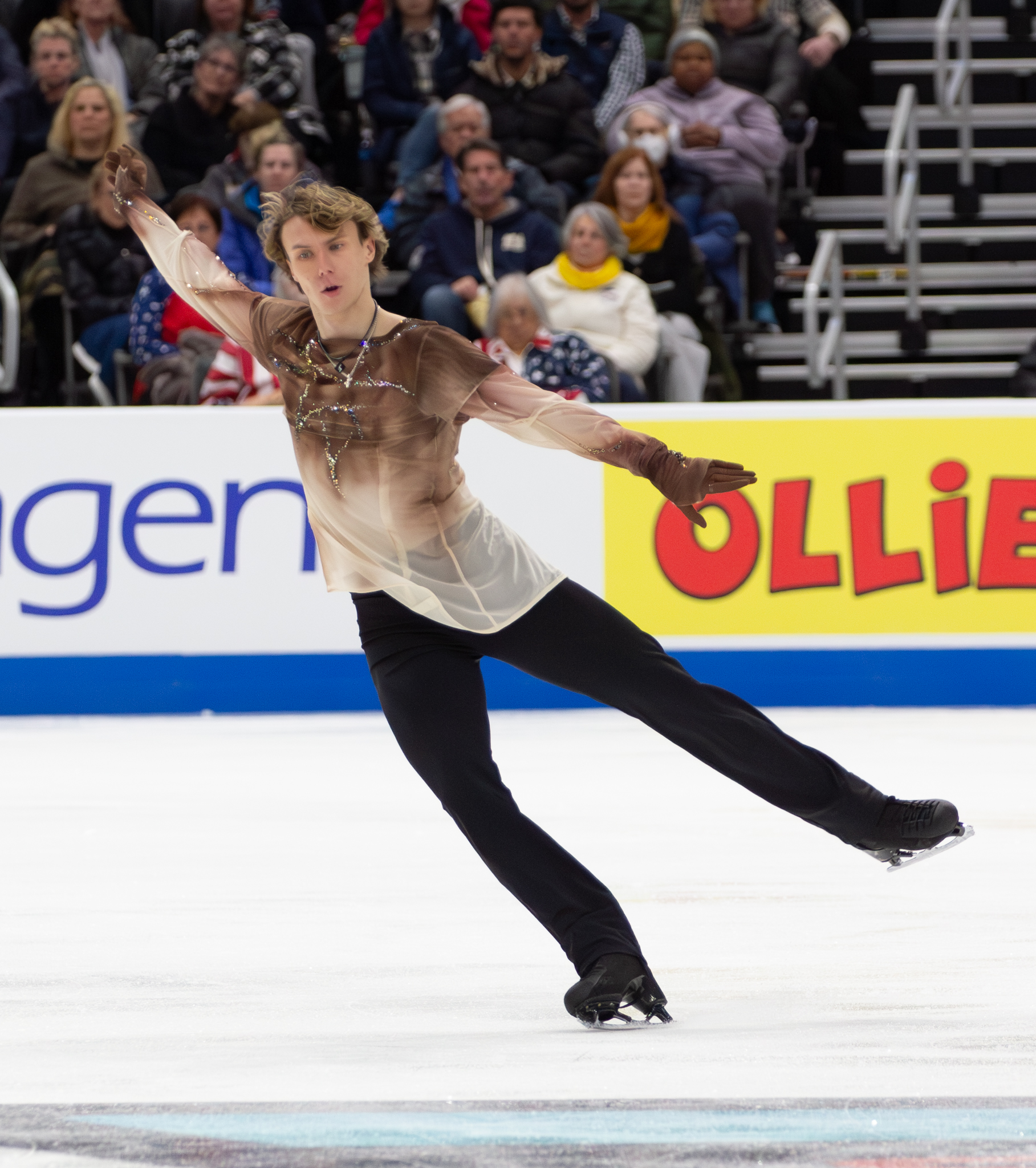
- Martynov at the 2026 U.S. Championships

Personal information
- Born: April 12, 2006 (age 20) Naperville, Illinois, U.S.

Figure skating career
- Country: United States
- Discipline: Men's singles
- Coach: Brian Orser Tracy Wilson
- Skating club: Great Lakes FSC
- Began skating: 2009

Daniel Martynov (born April 12, 2006) is an American figure skater. He is the 2024 CS Tallinn Trophy and 2026 CS Cranberry Cup International silver medalist.

On the junior level, Martynov won gold at 2023 JGP Armenia and bronze at 2023 JGP Japan.

== Personal life ==
Martynov was born on April 12, 2006 in Naperville, Illinois to Ukrainian emigrants Yevgeny Martynov and Marina Gromova. His father is a former competitive figure skater for Ukraine while his mother is a ballet dancer turned choreographer. Martynov has an older sister. The family has a cat named Lola. Martynov has Russian heritage and can speak Russian.

Martynov's favorite skater is Javier Fernández after following his entire career. He also looks up to Shoma Uno, Nathan Chen, and Jason Brown.

Martynov has also competed in ice theatre, placing fourth at 2022 National Theatre on Ice with Creative Ice Theatre. He enjoys fishing and hiking.

== Career ==
=== Early career ===
Martynov began skating at age three in 2009 under his parents' guidance in Naperville, Illinois, later joking that he "had absolutely no choice" growing up in a figure skating household. His father Yevgeny taught him to skate while his mother acted as choreographer. Martynov is the 2019 U.S. national intermediate silver medalist. Internationally, he is the 2019 International Challenge Cup advanced novice champion.

=== 2019–20 season ===
Martynov made his junior international debut in 2019, placing 15th at the 2019 JGP Croatia. He finished 12th at the 2020 U.S. Championships after skipping the novice level. Martynov had experienced tendonitis in his left knee prior to the U.S. Championships that ultimately sidelined him for three months.

=== 2020–21 season ===
As a result of the then-ongoing COVID-19 pandemic, the 2020–21 ISU Junior Grand Prix series was cancelled. In addition, Martynov's Chicago-area home rink also closed for a period of time due to the pandemic.

Martynov spent the period leading up to the 2021 U.S. Championships re-acquiring his triple Axel due to his tendonitis knee injury impacting his consistency. He expressed looking forward to competing in front of judges vs the virtual competitions held earlier in the season. Martynov said his goal is "to skate clean and whatever place I come in, is whatever place I come in." He ultimately finished fifth, narrowly missing the podium by 1.1 point.

=== 2021–22 season ===
Martynov missed the majority of the 2021–22 season due to injuries including a stress fracture in his back and a growth spurt that saw him grow nine inches over a matter of months in 2021. He later reflected that he had to "learn to overcome". Martynov stated that by late 2021, he would need to take a week off after each week of skating and that it hurt for him to walk or go up the stairs.

=== 2022–23 season ===
Ahead of the 2022–23 season, Martynov relocated alone to Coral Springs, Florida in August to train with Nikolai Morozov full-time after his parents had previously enlisted Morozov's help with training and choreography. For his short program, Martynov selected "Land of All" by Woodkid after being inspired by Nathan Chen's program to the same music several seasons ago. His free skating program to "Air" by Jan Werner was designed to contrast the technical nature of the short program and highlight his artistry.

Martynov placed 8th at his sole JGP assignment in Italy. He made his senior international debut in November at the 2022 CS Warsaw Cup, finishing 8th overall with a personal best score.

At the 2023 U.S. Championships, Martynov also competed at the senior level for the first time, finishing 11th overall. Despite missing the triple Axel in his short program, he said he was content with the experience overall. Martynov found the experience of competing against veteran skaters "surreal" and called it an "interesting opportunity". Following a post-Championships selection camp, he was named to his first World Junior Championships team.

Martynov went into the 2023 World Junior Championships with no specific goals beyond skating clean, expressing gratitude to have qualified given his struggles with injuries the past few seasons. He finished 10th overall after placing 10th in both segments of the competition.

=== 2023–24 season: Junior Grand Prix gold and bronze ===
Martynov initially received one 2023–24 ISU Junior Grand Prix assignment and opened the season at JGP Japan where he earned the bronze medal behind François Pitot and Lim Ju-heon. As a result, he was assigned a second event in Armenia. Martynov placed 1st in both segments to win the gold medal ahead of Shunsuke Nakamura and Fedir Kulish, also earning personal bests in all segments. His results qualified him to the 2023–24 Junior Grand Prix Final for the first time. In November, he competed at the 2023 CS Warsaw Cup, finishing 11th.

At the JGP Final, Martynov made a number of errors across both programs and finished sixth of six qualifiers. However, he said he felt well-prepared and just "wasn’t on my game today", adding after the free skating that he was "not that upset" about his skate. Martynov also included a quadruple jump for the first time in competition, attempting a quad toe loop in the free skating.

Martynov placed 9th at the senior level at the 2024 U.S. Championships. He was named to the 2024 World Junior Championships team. At Junior Worlds, he struggled with his combination in the short program after feeling "super nervous" to finish 11th in the segment. After a 16th-place free skating program, Martynov fell to 13th overall.

In May, following the end of the season, Martynov switched coaches to work with Florent Amodio and Artem Fedorchenko in Vaujany, France.

=== 2024–25 season ===
Martynov moved up fully to the senior level in 2024. He finished 10th at the 2024 CS Lombardia Trophy, 13th at the 2024 CS Denis Ten Memorial Challenge, and 7th at the 2024 Volvo Open Cup before earning his first senior international medal, silver at the 2024 CS Tallinn Trophy behind teammate Jacob Sanchez.

At the 2025 U.S. Championships, Martynov finished 11th and was named third alternate for the 2025 Four Continents Championships team. He subsequently withdrew from the Road to 26 Trophy and the Maria Olszewska Memorial.

=== 2025–26 season ===
Martynov opened the season at the 2025 CS Cranberry Cup International where he finished 16th. He then placed 7th at the 2025 CS Trialeti Trophy.

In November, Martynov announced a coaching change to Brian Orser and Tracy Wilson at the Toronto Cricket, Skating and Curling Club in North York, Ontario. He finished 6th at his next competition in December, the 2025 CS Golden Spin of Zagreb.

At the 2026 U.S. Championships, Martynov was 6th in short program and 10th in the free skating to finish 7th overall, impressing on the technical side with his two opening quads in the free skating. He was again named the third alternate for the 2026 Four Continents Championships team.

=== 2026–27 season ===
Martynov opened the season at the 2026 CS Cranberry Cup International where he won the silver medal. He then placed 5th at the 2026 CS Lombardia Trophy and 4th at the 2026 CS Denis Ten Memorial Challenge.

== Programs ==
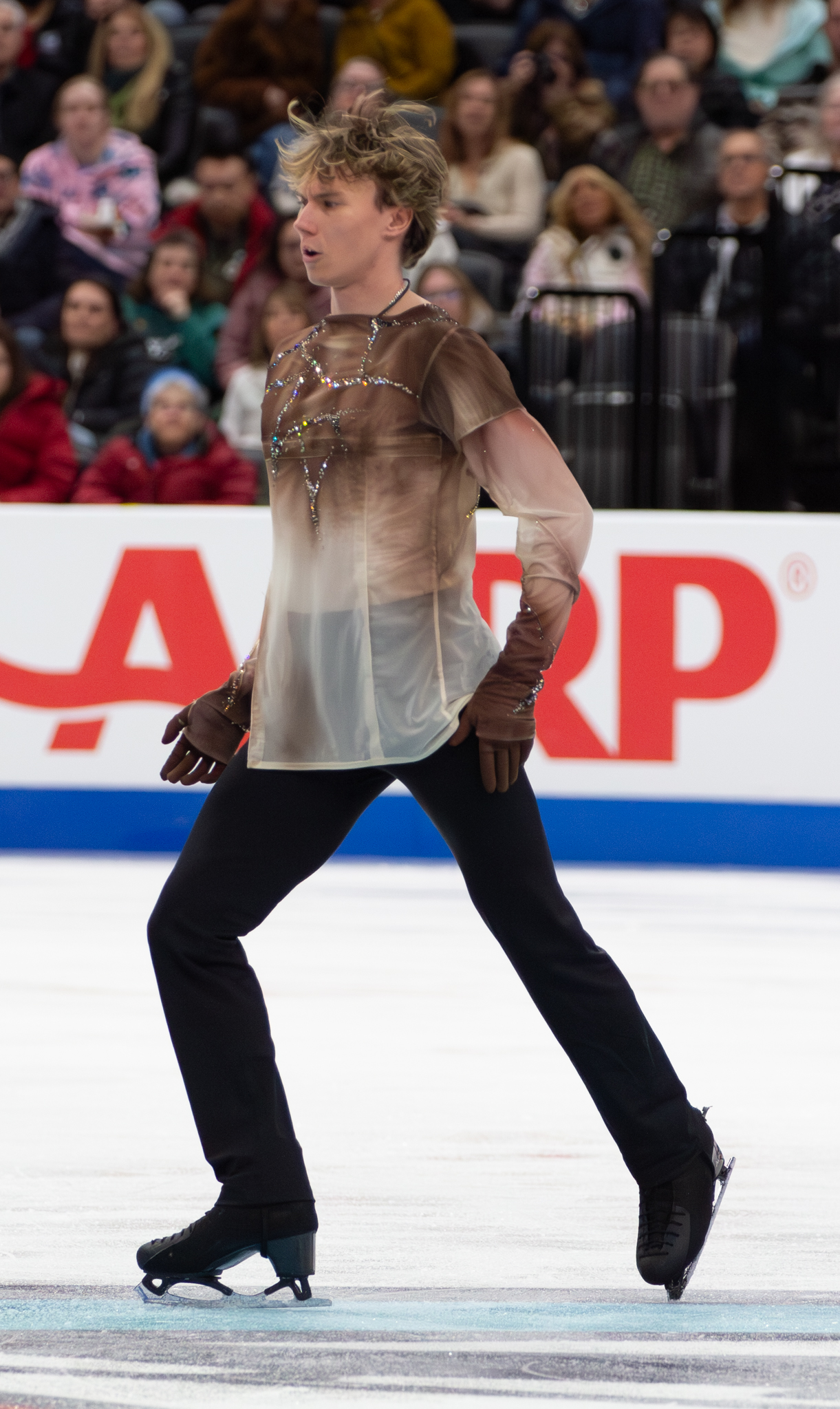
Martynov in the free skating at the 2026 U.S. Championships

Competition programs by season
Season	Short program	Free skate program
2019–20	Thunderstuck: Performed by AC/DC; Choreo. by Marina Gromova	E lucevan le stelle: From Tosca; Composed by Giacomo Puccini; Performed by Federico Paciotti; Choreo. by Nikolai Morozov
2020–21	The Untold: Composed by Secession Studios; Choreo. by Marina Gromova, Nikolai Morozov	Phantasia based on The Phantom of the Opera: Composed by Andrew Lloyd Webber, Julian Lloyd Webber, Sarah Chang; Choreo. by Marina Gromova, Nikolai Morozov
2021–22	The Untold	Frank Sinatra medley: 1. Come Fly with Me; Performed by 101 Strings Orchestra; 2. Luck Be a Lady; Performed by Frank Sinatra; Choreo. by Marina Gromova, Nikolai Morozov
2022–23	Land of All: Composed by Woodkid; Choreo. by Nikolai Morozov, Marina Gromova	Air: Performed by Jan Werner; Choreo. by Nikolai Morozov, Marina Gromova
2023–24	Dawn of Faith: Composed by Eternal Eclipse, Thomas-Adam Habuda; Choreo. by Nikolai Morozov, Marina Gromova	Iron: Composed by Woodkid; Choreo. by Nikolai Morozov, Marina Gromova
2024–25	Sing, Sing, Sing (with a Swing): Choreo. by Florent Amodio	Inside: Performed by Chris Avantgarde, Red Rosamond; Choreo. by Florent Amodio
2025–26	Formidable: Performed by Stromae; Choreo. by Florent Amodio, Artem Fedorchenko	La Passione: Composed by Laurent Perez Del Mar, Paul Gaugler; Choreo. by Florent Amodio, Artem Fedorchenko
2026–27	Radar Love: Performed by Golden Earring; Choreo. by Joey Russell	Piano Concerto No.3 in D Minor: Composed by Sergei Rachmaninov

== Competitive highlights ==
- JGP – ISU Junior Grand Prix Series
- CS – ISU Challenger Series
- TBD – To be decided
- WD – Withdrew

Competition placements at senior level
Season	2022–23	2023–24	2024–25	2025–26	2026–27
U.S. Championships	11th	9th	11th	7th	
GP Skate America					9th
CS Cranberry Cup				16th	2nd
CS Denis Ten Memorial			13th		4th
CS Golden Spin				6th	
CS Lombardia Trophy			10th		5th
CS Tallinn Trophy			2nd		
CS Trialeti Trophy				7th	
CS Warsaw Cup	8th	11th			
Coupe du Printemps				1st	
Skate Berlin				1st	
Volvo Open Cup			7th		

Competition placements at junior level
Season	2019–20	2020–21	2022–23	2023–24
World Junior Championships			10th	13th
Junior Grand Prix Final				6th
U.S. Championships	12th	5th		
JGP Armenia				1st
JGP Croatia	15th			
JGP Italy			8th	
JGP Japan				3rd

== Detailed results ==
ISU personal best scores in the +5/-5 GOE System
Segment	Type	Score	Event
Total	TSS	223.14	2026 CS Lombardia Trophy
Short program	TSS	84.17	2026 Skate America
Short program	TES	47.91	2026 Skate America
Short program	PCS	37.41	2025 CS Golden Spin of Zagreb
Free skating	TSS	147.77	2026 CS Lombardia Trophy
Free skating	TES	76.84	2026 CS Lombardia Trophy
Free skating	PCS	73.60	2024 CS Lombardia Trophy

=== Senior level ===
Results in the 2022–23 season
Date	Event	SP		FS		Total	
Date	Event	P	Score	P	Score	P	Score
Nov 17–20, 2022	(Poland) 2022 CS Warsaw Cup	9	71.75	9	132.39	8	204.14
Jan 23–29, 2023	(United States) 2023 U.S. Championships	14	64.04	8	149.63	11	213.67

Results in the 2023–24 season
Date	Event	SP		FS		Total	
Date	Event	P	Score	P	Score	P	Score
Nov 16–19, 2023	(Poland) 2023 CS Warsaw Cup	10	68.32	11	129.04	11	197.36
Jan 22–28, 2024	(United States) 2024 U.S. Championships	8	77.53	8	149.52	9	227.05

Results in the 2024–25 season
Date	Event	SP		FS		Total	
Date	Event	P	Score	P	Score	P	Score
Sep 13–15, 2024	(Italy) 2024 CS Lombardia Trophy	9	69.01	10	138.00	10	207.01
Oct 3–5, 2024	(Kazakhstan) 2024 CS Denis Ten Memorial Challenge	12	58.54	12	111.73	13	170.27
Oct 31 – Nov 2, 2024	(Latvia) 2024 Volvo Open Cup	13	50.66	2	133.04	7	183.70
Nov 12–17, 2024	(Estonia) 2024 CS Tallinn Trophy	4	75.61	6	137.12	2	212.73
Jan 20–26, 2025	(United States) 2025 U.S. Championships	8	81.89	15	125.43	11	207.32

Results in the 2025–26 season
Date	Event	SP		FS		Total	
Date	Event	P	Score	P	Score	P	Score
Aug 7–10, 2025	(United States) 2025 CS Cranberry Cup International	14	58.83	16	94.17	16	153.00
Oct 8–11, 2025	(Georgia (country)) 2025 CS Trialeti Trophy	4	79.70	8	137.50	7	217.20
Dec 3–6, 2025	(Croatia) 2025 CS Golden Spin of Zagreb	2	84.06	9	132.28	6	216.34
Jan 6–11, 2026	(United States) 2026 U.S. Championships	6	81.63	10	148.32	7	229.95
Feb 17–21, 2026	(Germany) 2026 Skate Berlin International	1	84.57	1	142.75	1	227.32
Mar 13–15, 2026	(Luxembourg) 2026 Coupe du Printemps	2	79.44	2	159.38	1	238.82

Results in the 2026–27 season
Date	Event	SP		FS		Total	
Date	Event	P	Score	P	Score	P	Score
Aug 6–9, 2026	(United States) 2026 CS Cranberry Cup International	3	79.34	2	142.04	2	221.38
Sep 17–20, 2026	(Italy) 2026 CS Lombardia Trophy	7	75.37	5	147.77	5	223.14
Oct 7–11, 2026	(Kazakhstan) 2026 CS Denis Ten Memorial Challenge	5	77.36	4	144.19	4	221.55
Nov 13–15, 2026	(United States) 2026 Skate America	5	84.17	12	136.79	9	220.96

=== Junior level ===
Results in the 2019–20 season
Date	Event	SP		FS		Total	
Date	Event	P	Score	P	Score	P	Score
Sep 25–28, 2019	2019 JGP Croatia	19	49.73	15	95.29	15	145.02
Jan 21–26, 2020	(United States) 2020 U.S. Championships	13	56.63	12	101.91	12	158.54

Results in the 2020–21 season
Date	Event	SP		FS		Total	
Date	Event	P	Score	P	Score	P	Score
Jan 11–21, 2021	(United States) 2021 U.S. Championships	6	62.06	5	114.39	5	176.45

Results in the 2022–23 season
Date	Event	SP		FS		Total	
Date	Event	P	Score	P	Score	P	Score
Oct 11–15, 2022	2022 JGP Italy	3	72.35	10	115.56	8	187.91
Feb 27 – Mar 5, 2023	(Canada) 2023 World Junior Championships	10	73.93	10	130.74	10	204.67

Results in the 2023–24 season
Date	Event	SP		FS		Total	
Date	Event	P	Score	P	Score	P	Score
Sep 13–16, 2023	2023 JGP Japan	5	70.75	4	137.23	3	207.98
Oct 4–7, 2023	2023 JGP Armenia	1	79.24	1	140.85	1	220.09
Dec 7–10, 2023	(China) 2023–24 Junior Grand Prix Final	5	66.23	6	117.24	6	183.47
Feb 26 – Mar 3, 2024	(Chinese Taipei) 2024 World Junior Championships	11	71.69	16	124.14	13	195.83
