= ISU Junior Grand Prix in Armenia =

International figure skating competition

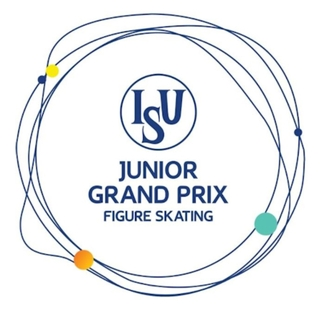
- Status: Inactive
- Genre: ISU Junior Grand Prix
- Frequency: Occasional
- Location: Yerevan
- Country: Armenia
- Inaugurated: 2018
- Most recent: 2023
- Organizer: Figure Skating Federation of Armenia

The ISU Junior Grand Prix in Armenia – also known as the Armenian Cup – is an international figure skating competition sanctioned by the International Skating Union (ISU), organized and hosted by the Figure Skating Federation of Armenia. It is held periodically as an event of the ISU Junior Grand Prix of Figure Skating (JGP), a series of international competitions exclusively for junior-level skaters. Medals may be awarded in men's singles, women's singles, pair skating, and ice dance. Skaters earn points based on their results at the qualifying competitions each season, and the top skaters or teams in each discipline are invited to then compete at the Junior Grand Prix of Figure Skating Final.

== History ==
The ISU Junior Grand Prix of Figure Skating (JGP) was established by the International Skating Union (ISU) in 1997 and consists of a series of seven international figure skating competitions exclusively for junior-level skaters. The locations of the Junior Grand Prix events change every year. While all seven competitions feature the men's, women's, and ice dance events, only four competitions each season feature the pairs event. Skaters earn points based on their results each season, and the top skaters or teams in each discipline are then invited to compete at the Junior Grand Prix of Figure Skating Final.

Skaters are eligible to compete on the junior-level circuit if they are at least 13 years old before 1 July of the respective season, but not yet 19 (for single skaters), 21 (for men and women in ice dance and women in pair skating), or 23 (for men in pair skating). Competitors are chosen by their respective skating federations. The number of entries allotted to each ISU member nation in each discipline is determined by their results at the prior World Junior Figure Skating Championships.

Armenia hosted its first Junior Grand Prix competition in 2018 in Yerevan. Adam Siao Him Fa of France won the men's event, Alexandra Trusova of Russia won the women's event, and Arina Ushakova and Maxim Nekrasov of Russia won the ice dance event.

Plans to host a Junior Grand Prix competition in Yerevan in 2022 were cancelled following the Azerbaijani invasion of Armenia. The ISU looked into re-allocating the assignment to another host nation, but when no feasible alternatives were found, the skaters who had been assigned to Yerevan were re-assigned to the other Junior Grand Prix events in Gdańsk, Poland, and Egna, Italy. The most recent iteration of this competition took place in 2023.

== Medalists ==
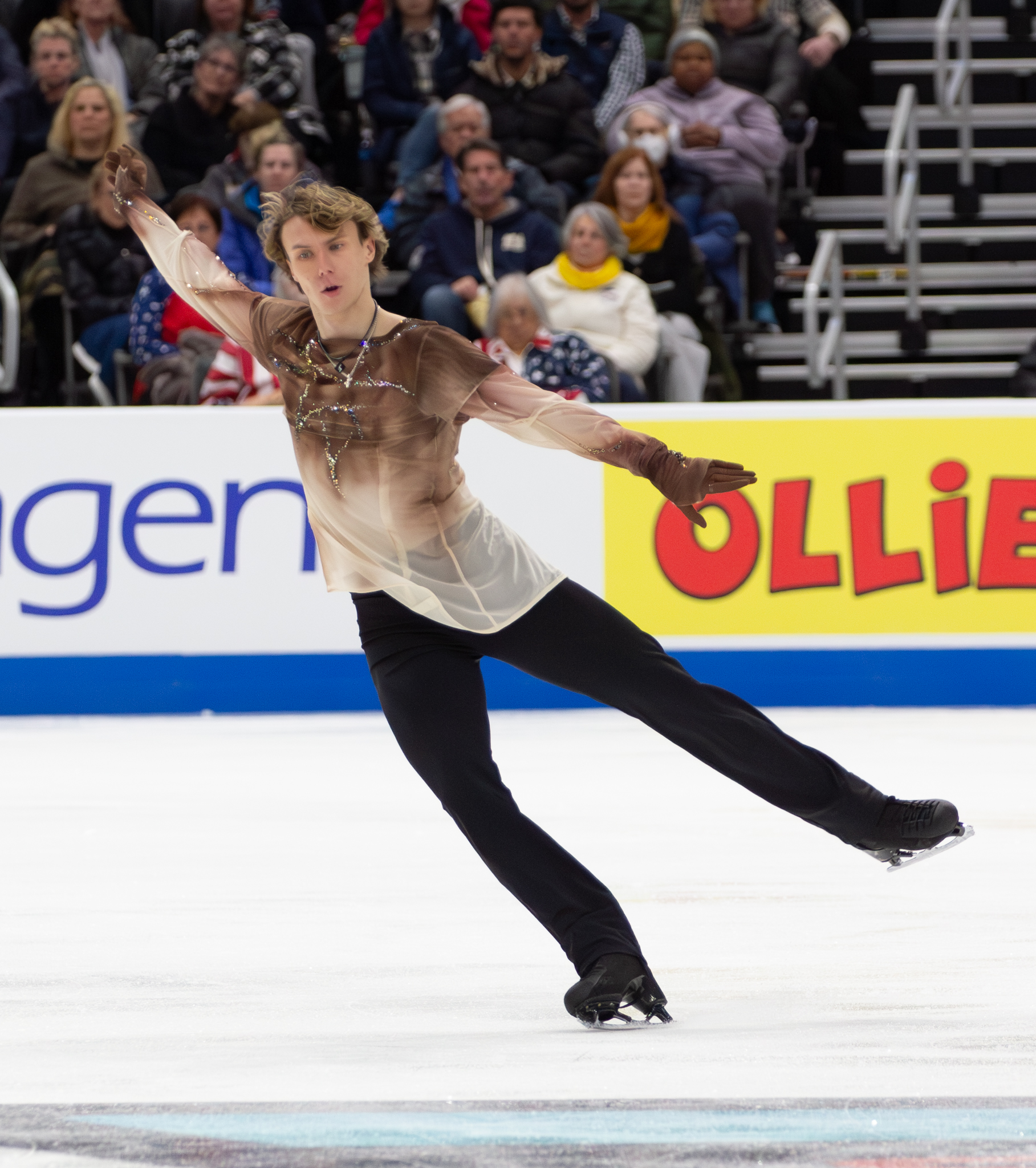
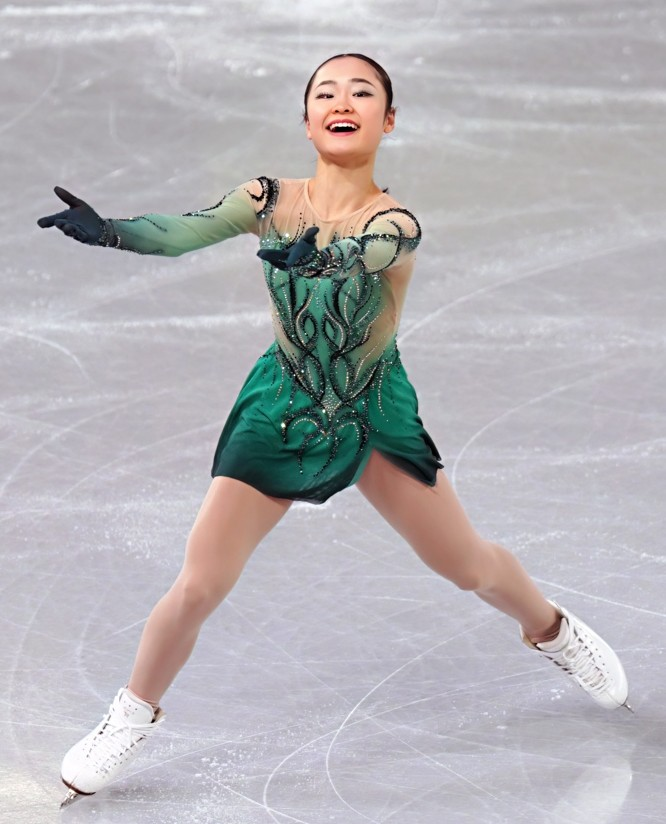
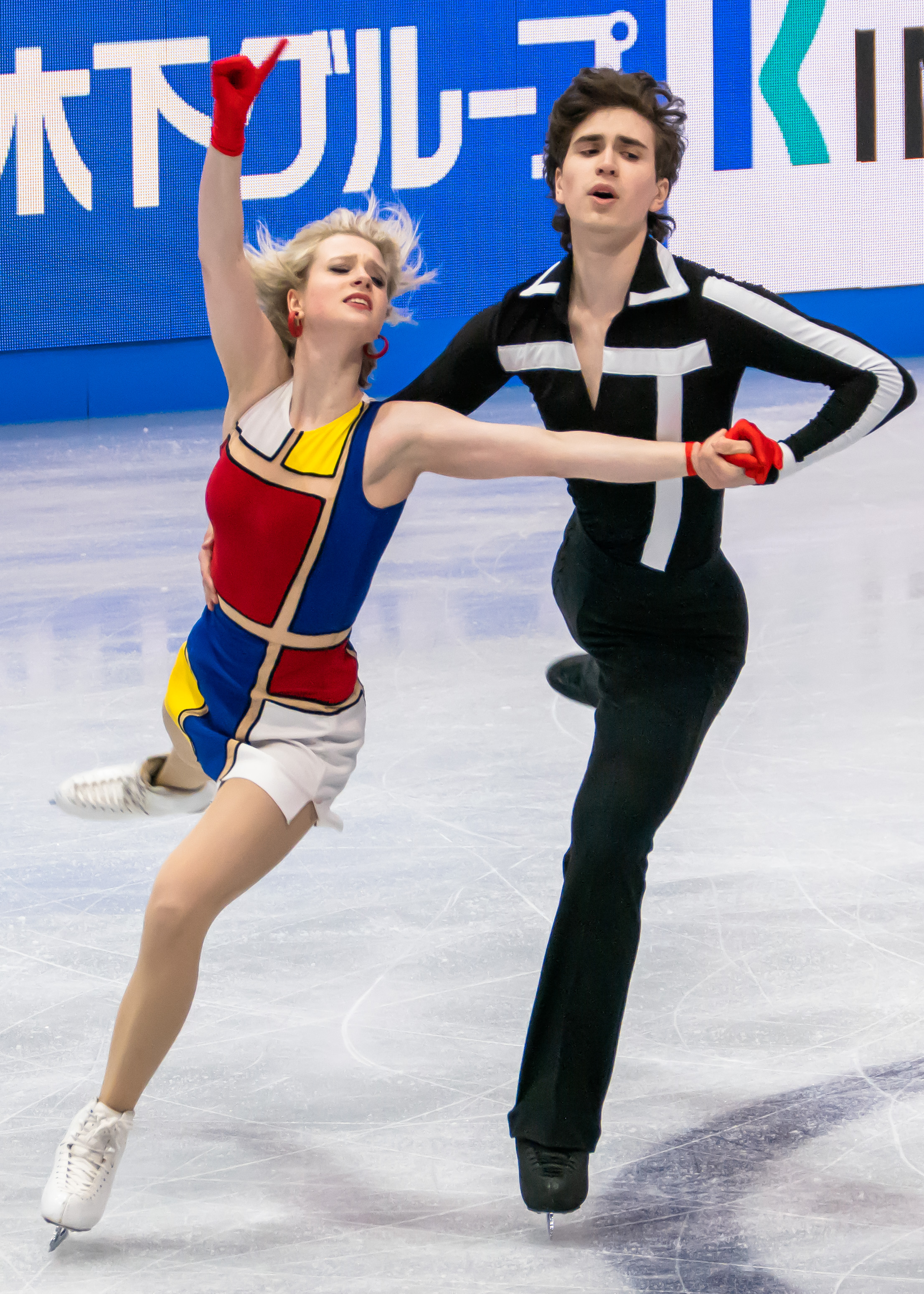
The 2023 Junior Grand Prix in Armenia champions: Daniel Martynov of the United States (men's singles); Mao Shimada of Japan (women's singles); and Elizabeth Tkachenko and Alexei Kiliakov of Israel (ice dance)

=== Men's singles ===
Men's event medalists
| Year | Location | Gold | Silver | Bronze | Ref. |
|---|---|---|---|---|---|
| 2018 | Yerevan | (France) Adam Siao Him Fa | (Japan) Yuma Kagiyama | (Canada) Iliya Kovler | |
| 2022 | Yerevan | Competition cancelled due to the Azerbaijani invasion of Armenia | | | |
| 2023 | Yerevan | (United States) Daniel Martynov | (Japan) Shunsuke Nakamura | (Latvia) Fedir Kulish | |

=== Women's singles ===
Women's event medalists
| Year | Location | Gold | Silver | Bronze | Ref. |
|---|---|---|---|---|---|
| 2018 | Yerevan | (Russia) Alexandra Trusova | (Russia) Alena Kanysheva | (Japan) Yuhana Yokoi | |
| 2022 | Yerevan | Competition cancelled due to the Azerbaijani invasion of Armenia | | | |
| 2023 | Yerevan | (Japan) Mao Shimada | (United States) Elyce Lin-Gracey | (United States) Sherry Zhang | |

=== Ice dance ===
Ice dance event medalists
| Year | Location | Gold | Silver | Bronze | Ref. |
|---|---|---|---|---|---|
| 2018 | Yerevan | (Russia); Arina Ushakova; Maxim Nekrasov | (Georgia (country)); Maria Kazakova; Georgy Reviya | (Canada); Ellie Fisher; Simon-Pierre Malette-Paquette | |
| 2022 | Yerevan | Competition cancelled due to the Azerbaijani invasion of Armenia | | | |
| 2023 | Yerevan | (Israel); Elizabeth Tkachenko; Alexei Kiliakov | (United States); Elliana Peal; Ethan Peal | (Italy); Noemi Maria Tali; Noah Lafornara | |
