= Elyce Lin-Gracey =

American figure skater (born 2007)

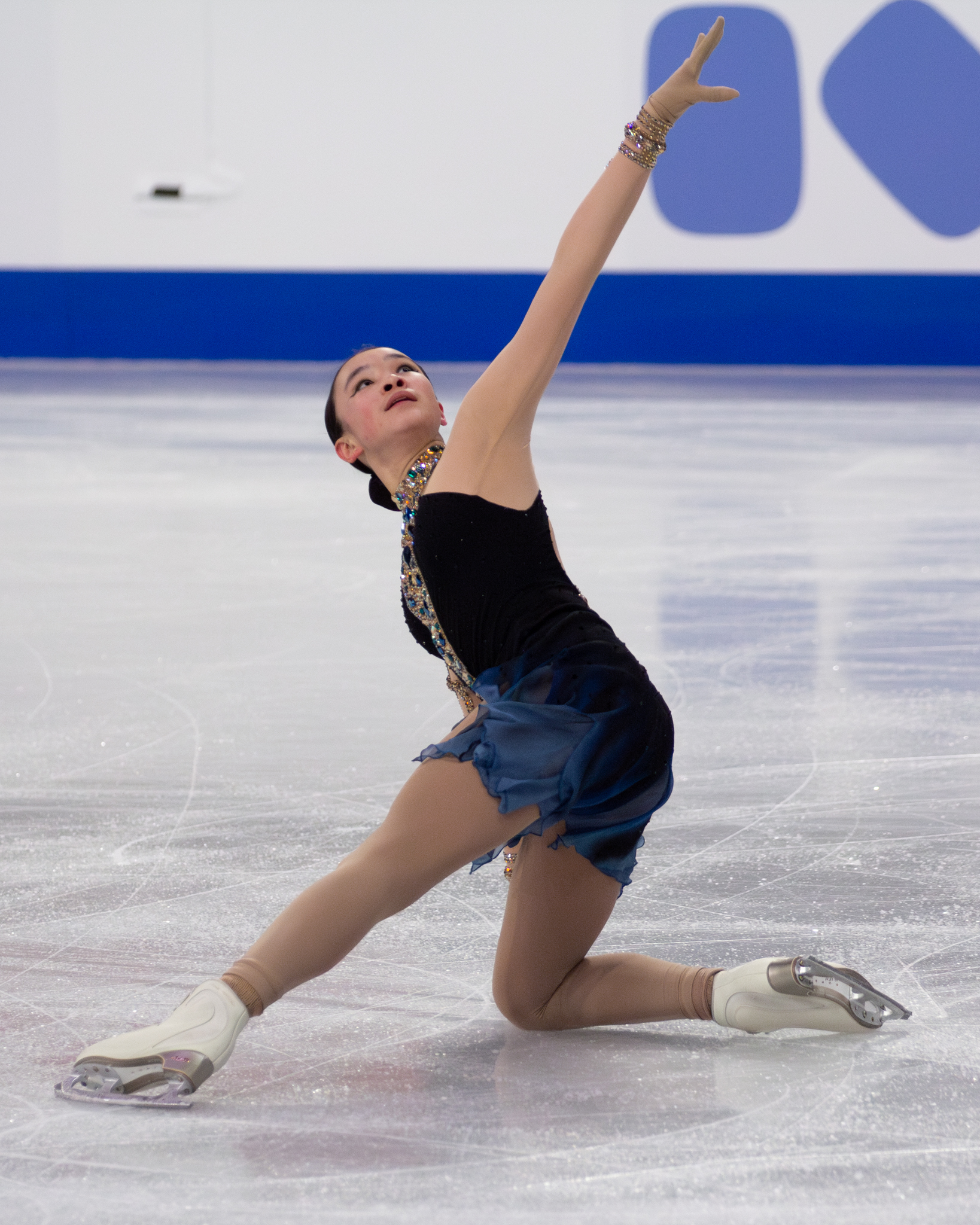
- Elyce Lin-Gracey at the 2024 Skate Canada International

Personal information
- Born: June 7, 2007 (age 19) Arcadia, California, U.S.
- Height: 5 ft 0 in (1.53 m)

Figure skating career
- Country: United States
- Discipline: Women's singles
- Coach: Drew Meekins; Sandy Straub; Damon Allen
- Skating club: Pasadena Figure Skating Club

Medal record
World Junior Championships
Bronze medal – third place	2025 Debrecen	Singles

Elyce Lin-Gracey (born June 7, 2007) is an American figure skater. She is the 2024 CS Nebelhorn Trophy champion, the 2024 CS Cranberry Cup silver medalist, and the 2023 CS Warsaw Cup bronze medalist.

At the junior level, Lin-Gracey is the 2025 World Junior bronze medalist, the 2023 JGP Armenia silver medalist, and the 2023 U.S. junior national bronze medalist.

== Personal life ==
Lin-Gracey was born on June 7, 2007, in Arcadia, California to mother Rhoda Lin, a physician, and father Andrew Gracey, a biology professor at the University of Southern California. She has three siblings: Wesley, Finley, and Georgiana. She also has a dog named Pixar and many pet birds. In summer 2023, Lin-Gracey and her family moved from California to Colorado Springs, Colorado so she could train there full-time.

Lin-Gracey is currently a student at Laurel Springs School.

== Career ==
=== Early career ===
Lin-Gracey began figure skating at the age of four. Her first figure skating coach was Natasha Adler-DeGuzman, who taught her at the Pasadena Figure Skating Club in Pasadena, California. While there, she took a ten-week Learn to Skate class by former U.S. National champion and two-time Olympian, Mirai Nagasu. She would later relocate to Lakewood, California, where she was coached by Amy Evidente and Naomi Nari Nam.

She made her national debut at the 2022 U.S. Junior Championships, where she finished fifth.

=== 2022–23 season ===
Lin-Gracey made her junior international debut on the 2022–23 Junior Grand Prix, finishing eighth at 2022 JGP Czech Republic and ninth at 2022 JGP Poland II. She would later reflect that it was "really exciting getting to be on the Junior Grand Prix circuit," even if "I didn't have the outcomes I would have liked to have."

At the 2023 U.S. Junior Championships, Lin-Gracey won the bronze medal. Following the season's end, Lin-Gracey moved to Colorado Springs, Colorado, where Tammy Gambill, Sandy Straub, and Damon Allen became her new coaches.

=== 2023–24 season: First Junior Grand Prix medal ===
Lin-Gracey began the season by making her senior international debut at the 2023 Cranberry Cup International, where she finished in fourth place. She then made her first appearance on the 2023–24 Junior Grand Prix, finishing fourth at the 2023 JGP Turkey. At her second event, the 2023 JGP Armenia, Lin-Gracey won the silver medal. She and the event's bronze medalist, fellow American Sherry Zhang, were the only JGP women's medalists that year from countries outside of East Asia. Based on her Junior Grand Prix placements, Lin-Gracey was named the second alternate to the 2023–24 Junior Grand Prix Final. Going on to compete on the senior level at the 2023 CS Warsaw Cup, Lin-Gracey won the bronze medal in her Challenger Series debut.

In advance of the 2024 U.S. Championships, Lin-Gracey was named as first alternate for the American women's team to the 2024 Four Continents Championships, which were to be held in Shanghai the week after the national championships. She came tenth at the national championships, but was named to the Four Continents team when national champion Amber Glenn opted to withdraw. Lin-Gracey placed seventh.

=== 2024–25 season: World Junior bronze ===
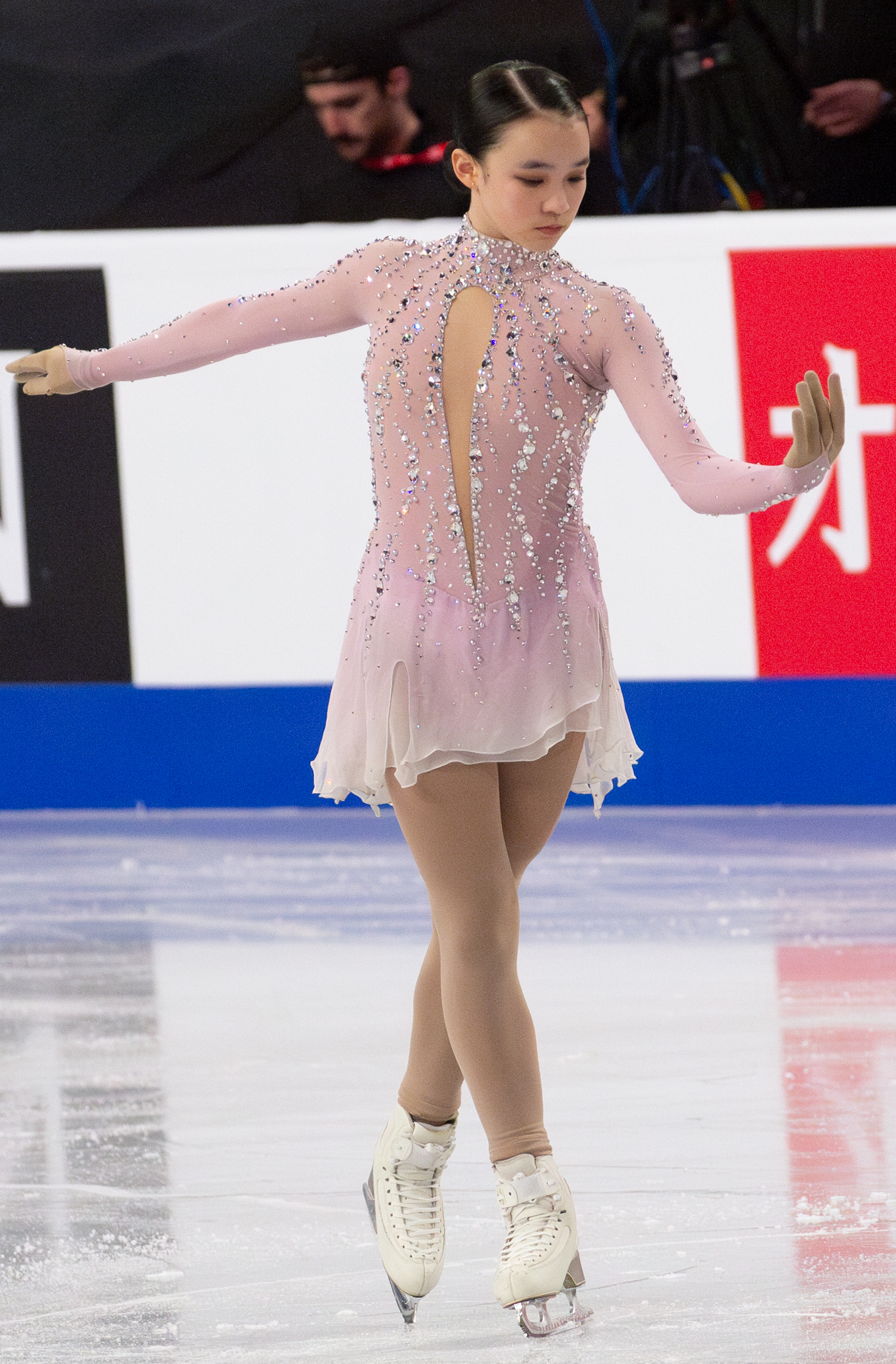
Lin-Gracey during her short program at 2024 Skate Canada International

Lin-Gracey opened her season by winning silver at the 2024 CS Cranberry Cup International behind teammate Sarah Everhardt, scoring a personal best total score by almost twenty points. At the 2024 CS Nebelhorn Trophy, Lin-Gracey won the gold medal ahead of reigning World silver medalist, Isabeau Levito, scoring personal bests in all competition segments, including a free skate score that was sixteen points higher than her previous personal best.

On the 2024–25 Grand Prix circuit, Lin-Gracey was initially only assigned to compete at 2024 Skate America after being selected as a host pick. However, in early October, she was soon announced to have been assigned to compete at 2024 Skate Canada International due to Finnish skater Nella Pelkonen withdrawing from the event. Lin-Gracey finished sixth at Skate America and seventh at Skate Canada International.

In January, Lin-Gracey competed at the 2025 U.S. National Figure Skating Championships in Wichita, Kansas, where she finished in eighth place.

Assigned to the team for the 2025 World Junior Championships in Debrecen, Hungary, Lin-Gracey placed fourth in the short program and third in the free skate, winning the bronze medal overall. “I really wanted to do my best to secure these spots for Junior Grand Prix for the U.S. ladies because I know the Junior Grand Prix is such a great experience," she said after the free skate. "When I was doing Junior Grand Prix, I was lucky to have 14 spots available, and I am very glad that me and Sophie both put out good free skates today.”

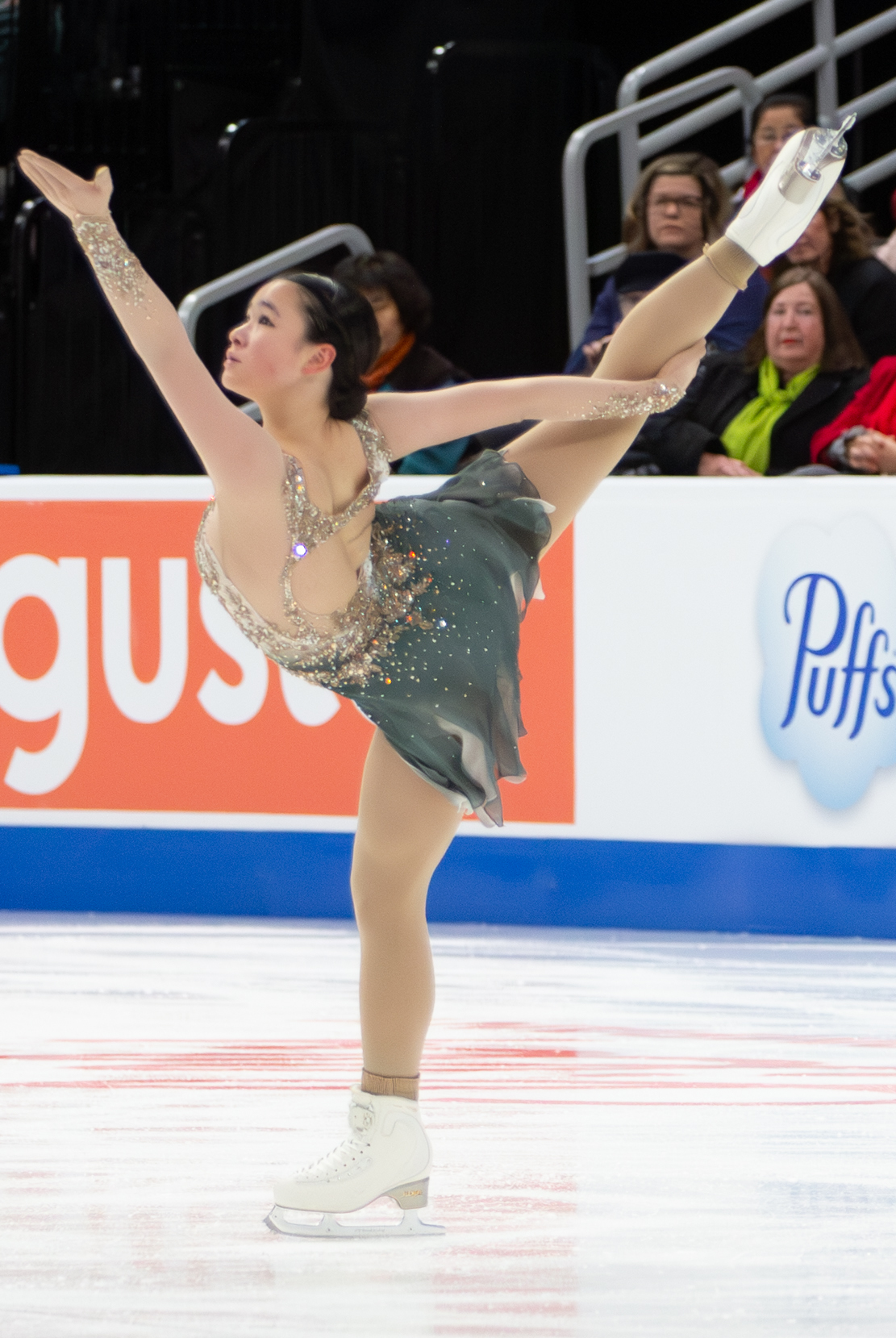
Lin-Gracey performing a Kerrigan spiral during her free skate at the 2026 U.S. Championships

Following her bronze medal win, she expressed satisfaction, saying, "After the U.S. Championships, I thought my 2024/2025 season was over. I was so sad it ended off on a bad note, frustrated that I didn’t put out performances like I did at the beginning of the season. But when I found out I had the opportunity to compete again I knew I had to revaluate and figure out how to achieve performances like that again. My nerves were at an all time high this past week because I wanted to put out 2 good performances that I would be proud of and everyone else would be proud of knowing that many people had put their faith in me. While my performances this past week weren’t perfect, it was an improvement and that I’m proud of."

=== 2025–26 season ===
Lin-Gracey suffered a concussion in late September from colliding with another skater, shortly prior to when the 2025 CS Nepela Memorial was set to take place. Despite this, she was cleared to compete at the event and finished eleventh overall. The following month, she went on to compete on the 2025–26 Grand Prix series, finishing eighth at the 2025 Grand Prix de France. While at the event, she sustained a hip injury and because of that considered withdrawing from her second Grand Prix assignment, the 2025 NHK Trophy. Lin-Gracey, however, ultimately decided to compete at the event, where she finished tenth overall.

Prior to the 2026 U.S. Championships, Lin-Gracey made a slight coaching change from Tammy Gambill, Drew Meekins, and Damon Allen to Drew Meekins, Sandy Straub, and Damon Allen. She then went on to finish the event in tenth place.

=== 2026-27 season ===
Lin-Gracey began her season by finishing 11th at the 2026 CS Nepala Memorial. Two months later at the 2027 Pacific Coast Sectionals, she was 10th in the short program and 4th in the free skate, finishing 7th overall.

== Programs ==
Season	Short program	Free skating	Exhibition
2021–22	Send In the Clowns (from A Little Night Music) by Stephen Sondheim performed by Lisa Hannigan	The Meadow (from The Twilight Saga: New Moon) by Alexandre Desplat; Opportunity (from Annie) by Sia	
2022–23	The Prayer performed by Lexi Walker and Jenny Oaks Baker choreo. by Drew Meekins, Jamie Isley	Moonlight by Jennifer Thomas and Viktoria Tocca; Moonlight Sonata Mvt. 3 performed by Tommee Profitt choreo. by Drew Meekins, Jamie Isley	
2023–24	Someone Like You (from Jekyll & Hyde) performed by Linda Eder choreo. by Drew Meekins, Jamie Isley	Anna's Theme (from The Red Violin) by John Corigliano performed by Joshua Bell; Not About Angels (from The Fault in Our Stars) by Birdy; Remember Me by Thomas Bergersen choreo. by Drew Meekins, Jamie Isley	
2024–25	Broken Vow by Lara Fabian & Walter Afanasieff choreo. by Drew Meekins, Jamie Isley	Cléopâtre; Wadt; Cleopatra's Death by Claude-Michel Schönberg choreo. by Drew Meekins, Jamie Isley	Ocean Eyes by Billie Eilish
2025–26	Broken Vow by Lara Fabian & Walter Afanasieff choreo. by Drew Meekins, Jamie Isley	The Wheat (Gladiator) by Hans Zimmer; Gladiator II Overture (from Gladiator II) by Harry Gregson-Williams; Now We Are Free (from Gladiator) by Hans Zimmer & Lisa Gerrard performed by 2Cellos; Strength and Honor (from Gladiator II) by Harry Gregson-Williams choreo. by Drew Meekins	The Winner Takes It All by ABBA performed by Sarah Dawn Finer
2026–27	When The Party's Over; by Billie Eilish choreo. by Amber Glenn		

== Competitive highlights ==
- GP – Event of the ISU Grand Prix Series
- JGP – Event of the ISU Junior Grand Prix Series
- CS – Event of the ISU Challenger Series
- TBD – Assigned
- WD – Withdrew from competition

Competition placements at senior level
Season	2023–24	2024–25	2025–26	2026–27
Four Continents Championships	8th			
U.S. Championships	10th	8th	10th	
GP France			8th	
GP NHK Trophy			10th	
GP Skate America		6th		
GP Skate Canada		7th		
CS Cranberry Cup	4th	2nd		
CS Golden Spin of Zagreb			5th	
CS Nebelhorn Trophy		1st		
CS Nepela Memorial			11th	11th
CS Warsaw Cup	3rd			

Competition placements at junior level
Season	2021–22	2022–23	2023–24	2024–25
World Junior Championships				3rd
U.S. Championships	5th	3rd		
JGP Armenia			2nd	
JGP Czech Republic		8th		
JGP Poland		9th		
JGP Turkey			4th	
Challenge Cup	5th			

== Detailed results ==
ISU personal best scores in the +5/-5 GOE System
Segment	Type	Score	Event
Total	TSS	213.33	2024 CS Nebelhorn Trophy
Short program	TSS	71.16	2024 CS Nebelhorn Trophy
Short program	TES	39.44	2024 CS Nebelhorn Trophy
Short program	PCS	31.72	2024 CS Nebelhorn Trophy
Free skating	TSS	142.17	2024 CS Nebelhorn Trophy
Free skating	TES	75.15	2024 CS Nebelhorn Trophy
Free skating	PCS	67.02	2024 CS Nebelhorn Trophy

=== Senior level ===
Results in the 2023–24 season
Date	Event	SP		FS		Total	
Date	Event	P	Score	P	Score	P	Score
Aug 11–13, 2023	(United States) 2023 Cranberry Cup International	3	58.70	6	103.88	4	162.58
Nov 15–17, 2023	(Poland) 2023 CS Warsaw Cup	4	59.85	3	117.65	3	177.50
Jan 22–28, 2024	(United States) 2024 U.S. Championships	10	59.71	9	114.86	10	173.11
Jan 30 – Feb 4, 2024	(China) 2024 Four Continents Championships	8	62.83	11	111.15	8	173.98

Results in the 2024–25 season
Date	Event	SP		FS		Total	
Date	Event	P	Score	P	Score	P	Score
Aug 8–11, 2024	(United States) 2024 CS Cranberry Cup International	1	67.88	3	126.11	2	193.99
Sep 18–21, 2024	(Germany) 2024 CS Nebelhorn Trophy	1	71.16	1	142.17	1	213.33
Oct 18–20, 2024	(United States) 2024 Skate America	7	60.22	7	123.72	6	183.94
Oct 25–27, 2024	2024 Skate Canada International	5	58.64	6	123.73	7	182.37
Jan 20–26, 2025	(United States) 2025 U.S. Championships	8	61.47	9	117.75	8	179.22

Results in the 2025–26 season
Date	Event	SP		FS		Total	
Date	Event	P	Score	P	Score	P	Score
Sep 25–27, 2025	(Slovakia) 2025 CS Nepela Memorial	13	52.34	10	101.69	11	154.03
Oct 17–19, 2025	2025 Grand Prix de France	7	59.30	9	112.77	8	172.07
Nov 7–9, 2025	(Japan) 2025 NHK Trophy	8	60.62	10	101.79	10	162.41
Dec 3–6, 2025	(Croatia) 2025 CS Golden Spin of Zagreb	5	59.84	5	115.96	5	175.80
Jan 4–11, 2026	(United States) 2026 U.S. Championships	7	65.24	11	109.52	10	174.76

Results in the 2026–27 season
Date	Event	SP		FS		Total	
Date	Event	P	Score	P	Score	P	Score
Sep 24–27, 2026	(Slovakia) 2026 CS Nepela Memorial	8	57.43	14	88.45	11	145.88

=== Junior level ===
Results in the 2021–22 season
Date	Event	SP		FS		Total	
Date	Event	P	Score	P	Score	P	Score
Jan 3–9, 2022	(United States) 2022 U.S. Championships (Junior)	2	62.53	6	104.43	5	166.96
Feb 24–27, 2022	(Netherlands) 2022 International Challenge Cup	5	51.48	5	98.10	5	149.58

Results in the 2022–23 season
Date	Event	SP		FS		Total	
Date	Event	P	Score	P	Score	P	Score
Aug 31 – Sep 3, 2022	2022 JGP Czech Republic	6	56.15	8	96.73	8	152.88
Oct 5–8, 2022	2022 JGP Poland II	11	52.90	8	105.48	9	158.38
Jan 23–29, 2023	(United States) 2023 U.S. Championships (Junior)	2	65.57	7	100.00	3	165.57

Results in the 2023–24 season
Date	Event	SP		FS		Total	
Date	Event	P	Score	P	Score	P	Score
Sep 6–9, 2023	2023 JGP Turkey	5	59.75	3	119.41	4	179.16
Oct 4–7, 2023	2023 JGP Armenia	2	64.50	4	111.61	2	176.11

Results in the 2024–25 season
Date	Event	SP		FS		Total	
Date	Event	P	Score	P	Score	P	Score
Feb 25 – Mar 2, 2025	(Hungary) 2025 World Junior Championships	4	66.11	3	122.60	3	188.71
