= Charly Laliberté Laurent =

Canadian figure skater (born 2005)

Personal information
- Born: 23 June 2005 (age 21) Montreal, Quebec, Canada
- Home town: Boucherville, Quebec, Canada
- Height: 1.84 m (6 ft 1/2 in)

Figure skating career
- Country: Canada
- Discipline: Pair skating
- Partner: Nina Ouelette (since 2025); Martina Ariano Kent (2023–25); Alexane Jean (2021–23)
- Coach: Marc-André Craig; David Alexandre Paradis
- Skating club: Académie Performance Isatis
- Began skating: 2008

Medal record
Representing Canada
World Junior Championships
Bronze medal – third place	2025 Debrecen	Pairs

Charly Laliberté Laurent (born 23 June 2005) is a Canadian pair skater. With former skating partner, Martina Ariano Kent, he is the 2025 World Junior bronze medallist, the 2023 JGP Austria champion, the 2023 JGP Hungary bronze medallist, and a two-time Canadian junior national silver medallist.

== Personal life ==
Laliberté Laurent was born on June 23, 2005 in Montreal, Quebec, Canada. He has dual French-Canadian citizenship.

== Career ==
=== Early years ===
Laliberté Laurent began learning how to skate in 2008. He began competing in the pairs discipline in 2021, teaming up with Alexane Jean. The pair trained at the Académie Performance Isatis in Chambly, Quebec. They were coached by Anabelle Langlois and Cody Hay during the 2021–22 figure skating season before switching coaches to Marc-André Craig and David-Alexandre Paradis for the 2022–23 figure skating season. Together, Jean/Laliberté Laurent won the 2023 Canadian Novice Championships before parting ways following the event.

=== Partnership with Martina Ariano Kent ===
==== 2023–24 season: International debut ====
In summer 2023, Laliberté Laurent teamed up with Martina Ariano Kent and the pair subsequently started training at the Académie Performance Isatis under coaches, Marc-André Craig and David-Alexandre Paradis.

Ariano Kent/Laliberté Laurent debuted on the 2023–24 ISU Junior Grand Prix in late August at 2023 JGP Austria, winning the event. They subsequently went on to win bronze at 2023 JGP Hungary. With these results, the pair qualified for the 2023–24 Junior Grand Prix Final in Beijing, China. At that event, Ariano Kent/Laliberté Laurent placed third in the short program, fourth in the free skate, and finished fourth overall.

In January, the team won the silver medal behind Kemp/Elizarov at the 2024 Canadian Junior Championships. Selected to compete at the 2024 World Junior Championships in Taipei, Taiwan, Ariano Kent/Laliberté Laurent closed the season by finishing the event in fifth place. The team was not happy with their performances and admitted they could have done better. “But I am glad we fought until the end,” said Ariano Kent. “We will stay one more year in juniors and will take the experience from this year into next season.”

==== 2024–25 season: World Junior bronze ====
During the early off-season, Laliberté Laurent suffered a torn labrum in his right shoulder. In June, he travelled to France to have surgery performed and underwent a six-month rehabilitation process at the Centre Européen de Rééducation du Sportif in Capbreton. Following that, he returned to Quebec and resumed training with Ariano Kent in December.

The following month, Ariano Kent/Laliberté Laurent returned to competition at the 2025 Canadian Junior Championships, where they won the silver medal behind Kemp/Elizarov. The following week, the pair competed on the junior level at the 2025 Bavarian Open and won the bronze medal.

Selected to compete at the 2025 World Junior Championships in Debrecen, Hungary, Ariano Kent/Laliberté Laurent placed fourth in short program and third in the free skate, winning the bronze medal overall. Laliberté Laurent called this result "a dream come true." “During my rehab, the first six months, I really thought I would never be coming back to the ice," said Laliberte-Laurent. "But now I'm here. I feel like this episode only made us stronger and made this result today possible. We are super happy!”

In July 2025, it was announced that the pair had parted ways.

=== Partnership with Nina Ouelette ===
In December 2025, it was announced that Laliberté Laurent had teamed up with American figure skater, Nina Ouelette, and that the pair would represent Canada.

== Programs ==
=== With Ariano Kent ===
Season	Short program	Free skating
2024–2025	I'm Gonna Be (500 Miles) by The Proclaimers choreo. by Joey Russell	Radioactive by Imagine Dragons; Finally Free by Karl Hugo choreo. by Mylène Girard
2023–2024	I'm Gonna Be (500 Miles) by The Proclaimers choreo. by Joey Russell	Radioactive by Imagine Dragons; Finally Free by Karl Hugo choreo. by Mylène Girard

== Competitive highlights ==
- JGP – Event of the ISU Junior Grand Prix Series
- TBD – Assigned
- WD – Withdrew from competition

=== Pair skating with Ariano Kent ===
Competition placements at junior level
Season	2023–24	2024–25
World Junior Championships	5th	3rd
Canadian Championships	2nd	2nd
JGP Final	4th	
JGP Austria	1st	
JGP Hungary	3rd	
Bavarian Open		3rd
Skate Canada NextGen	1st	
Quebec Summer Championships	1st	
