= Martina Ariano Kent =

Canadian figure skater (born 2007)

Personal information
- Born: 23 April 2007 (age 19) LaSalle, Quebec, Canada
- Home town: Montreal, Quebec, Canada

Figure skating career
- Country: Canada
- Discipline: Pair skating (since 2023); Women's singles (until 2023)
- Partner: Charly Laliberté Laurent (2023–25); Alexis Leduc (2022–23)
- Coach: Marc-André Craig; David Alexandre Paradis
- Skating club: Town of Mount Royal FSC
- Began skating: 2016

Medal record
Representing Canada
World Junior Championships
Bronze medal – third place	2025 Debrecen	Pairs

Martina Ariano Kent (born 23 April 2007) is a Canadian pair skater. With former skating partner, Charly Laliberté Laurent, she is the 2025 World Junior bronze medallist, the 2023 JGP Austria champion, the 2023 JGP Hungary bronze medallist, and a two-time Canadian junior national silver medallist.

== Personal life ==
Ariano Kent was born on April 23, 2007 in LaSalle, Quebec, Canada.

== Career ==
=== Early years ===
Ariano Kent started learning to skate in 2016. Initially competing in the women's singles discipline, she was coached by Amélie Lacoste and Van Truong during the 2021–22 figure skating season in Mount Royal, Quebec and by Ian Connolly and Stéphanie Fiorito in Sainte-Julie during the 2022–23 figure skating season.

She began competing in the pairs discipline during the 2022–23 figure skating season, teaming up with Alexis Leduc. The pair were coached by Ian Connolly and Maxime Deschamps in Sainte-Julie. Together, they won the bronze medal at the 2023 Canadian Junior Championships before parting ways following the end of the season.

=== Partnership with Laliberté Laurent ===
==== 2023–24 season: International debut ====
In summer 2023, Ariano Kent teamed up with Charly Laliberté Laurent and the pair subsequently started training at the Académie Performance Isatis in Chambly, Quebec under coaches, Marc-André Craig and David-Alexandre Paradis.

Ariano Kent/Laliberté Laurent debuted on the 2023–24 ISU Junior Grand Prix in late August at 2023 JGP Austria, winning the event. They subsequently went on to win bronze at 2023 JGP Hungary. With these results, the pair qualified for the 2023–24 Junior Grand Prix Final in Beijing, China. At that event, Ariano Kent/Laliberté Laurent placed third in the short program, fourth in the free skate, and finished fourth overall.

In January, the team won the silver medal behind Kemp/Elizarov at the 2024 Canadian Junior Championships. Selected to compete at the 2024 World Junior Championships in Taipei, Taiwan, Ariano Kent/Laliberté Laurent closed the season by finishing the event in fifth place. The team was not happy with their performances and admitted they could have done better. “But I am glad we fought until the end,” said Ariano Kent. “We will stay one more year in juniors and will take the experience from this year into next season.”

==== 2024–25 season: World Junior bronze ====
During the early off-season, Laliberté Laurent suffered a torn labrum in his right shoulder. In June, he travelled to France to have surgery performed and underwent a six-month rehabilitation process at the Centre Européen de Rééducation du Sportif in Capbreton. Following that, he returned to Quebec and resumed training with Ariano Kent in December.

The following month, Ariano Kent/Laliberté Laurent returned to competition at the 2025 Canadian Junior Championships, where they won the silver medal behind Kemp/Elizarov. The following week, the pair competed on the junior level at the 2025 Bavarian Open and won the bronze medal.

Selected to compete at the 2025 World Junior Championships in Debrecen, Hungary, Ariano Kent/Laliberté Laurent placed fourth in short program and third in the free skate, winning the bronze medal overall. Laliberté Laurent called this result "a dream come true." “During my rehab, the first six months, I really thought I would never be coming back to the ice," said Laliberte-Laurent. "But now I'm here. I feel like this episode only made us stronger and made this result today possible. We are super happy!”

In July 2025, it was announced that the pair had parted ways.

== Programs ==
=== With Laliberté Laurent ===
Season	Short program	Free skating
2024–2025	I'm Gonna Be (500 Miles) by The Proclaimers choreo. by Joey Russell	Radioactive by Imagine Dragons; Finally Free by Karl Hugo choreo. by Mylène Girard
2023–2024	I'm Gonna Be (500 Miles) by The Proclaimers choreo. by Joey Russell	Radioactive by Imagine Dragons; Finally Free by Karl Hugo choreo. by Mylène Girard

== Competitive highlights ==
- JGP – Event of the ISU Junior Grand Prix Series
- TBD – Assigned
- WD – Withdrew from competition

=== Pair skating with Laliberté Laurent ===
Competition placements at junior level
Season	2023–24	2024–25
World Junior Championships	5th	3rd
Canadian Championships	2nd	2nd
JGP Final	4th	
JGP Austria	1st	
JGP Hungary	3rd	
Bavarian Open		3rd
Skate Canada NextGen	1st	
Quebec Summer Championships	1st	

=== Pair skating with Leduc ===
Competition placements at junior level
Season	2022–23
Canadian Championships	3rd
Skate Canada Challenge	2nd
Souvenir Georges-Éthier	1st
