= Kaiya Ruiter =

Canadian figure skater (born 2006)

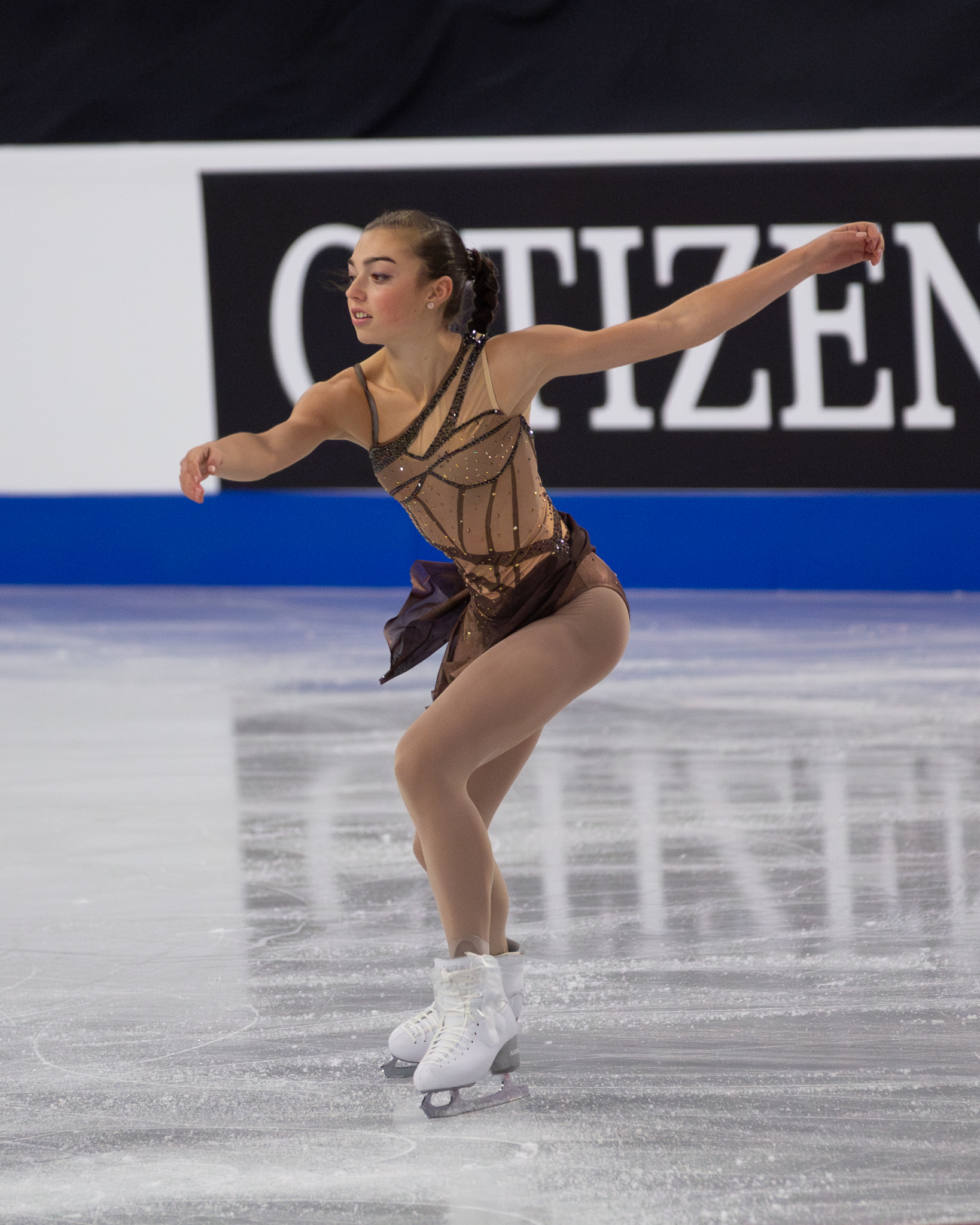
- Kaiya Ruiter at the 2024 Skate Canada International

Personal information
- Born: 13 May 2006 (age 20) Ottawa, Ontario, Canada
- Home town: Calgary, Alberta
- Height: 1.52 m (5 ft 0 in)

Figure skating career
- Country: Canada
- Discipline: Women's singles
- Coach: Tracy Wilson; Brian Orser
- Skating club: Calalta Figure Skating Club
- Began skating: 2010

Medal record
Canadian Championships
Gold medal – first place	2024 Calgary	Singles
Silver medal – second place	2023 Oshawa	Singles
Winter Youth Olympics
Bronze medal – third place	2024 Gangneung	Team

Kaiya Ruiter (born 13 May 2006) is a Canadian figure skater. She is a two-time ISU Challenger Series silver medalist, the 2024 Canadian national champion, and the 2023 Canadian national silver medalist.

On the junior level, Ruiter is a 2024 Youth Olympic bronze medalist in the team event, a two-time ISU Junior Grand Prix medalist, and the 2020 Canadian junior national champion.

== Personal life ==
Ruiter was born on 13 May 2006 in Ottawa, Ontario, to parents Kris and Victoria. She is the second of four children. Her three sisters – Keaghan, Vaunya, and Vyan – have all competed in figure skating. Ruiter attends school through a homeschooling program.

== Career ==
=== Early years ===
Ruiter began learning to skate with her parents and sisters at age four on the Rideau Canal in Ottawa. She officially began training at age six at the Gloucester Skating Club under Darlene Joseph.

Ruiter's family relocated from Ottawa to Edmonton in 2016 when Ruiter was 10, and there she began training under Ravi Walia, coach of the 2018 Olympic bronze medalist Kaetlyn Osmond. However, ten months later, the family moved again, this time to Calgary, and Ruiter began working with her current coaches, Jeff Langdon and Scott Davis, per Walia's recommendation. Ruiter landed her first triple jump, a triple toe loop, in November 2018 and went on to learn the rest of her triple jumps and triple-triple combinations within a year.

In January 2019, Ruiter won the 2019 Canadian novice national title, setting a new national record for the novice women's event with a score of 139.57 (later broken by Amy Shao Ning Yang in 2020). The following month, she competed at her first international assignment, the 2019 Bavarian Open, where she placed third in the novice women's category behind Kimmy Repond of Switzerland, and Lindsay Thorngren from the United States.

=== 2019–20 season: International junior debut ===
As the reigning national novice champion, Ruiter was selected to appear twice on the Junior Grand Prix in the autumn of 2019, with her first assignment being the 2019 JGP Latvia in Riga. Making errors in both programs, she finished eleventh overall but called it "a great experience," adding that "I just loved to skate out there and enjoyed every moment even though I didn't have my best skate." She made a significant improvement at her second event, the 2019 JGP Italy in Egna, where she finished sixth. Her score of 159.07 points was a junior record for a Canadian woman.

Following her international outings, Ruiter competed at and won the junior event at the 2020 Skate Canada Challenge, the final qualifying event for the 2020 Canadian Junior Championships. She took the gold medal with a total score of 174.83 points, bettering her own national junior record and winning by a margin of 31.52 points over silver medallist Emily Millard. By the time of the championships, Ruiter was attracting significant media attention due to both her technical content and the comparatively weak women's field at the senior event that occurred. She was the only competitor at either the senior or junior levels to successfully perform a triple Lutz-triple toe loop combination and one of only a few to even attempt it. Her score was slightly short of senior national champion Emily Bausback's winning score of 175.54, but would have surpassed it with the additional senior choreographic sequence included.

Ruiter was given additional international assignments for the remainder of the season, first winning gold in the junior event at the Bavarian Open. Her season had a disappointing finish at the 2020 World Junior Championships in Tallinn, where she fell twice in the short program and did not qualify for the free skate segment, coming in thirty-first.

=== 2020–21 season: Pandemic ===
The onset of the COVID-19 pandemic significantly disrupted training and competitions for all skaters. With the international junior season and the Canadian domestic season largely cancelled, Ruiter's lone major competitive appearance came at a virtually-held 2021 Skate Canada Challenge. Competing in the senior women's category for the first time, she won the short program but dropped to fourth place following the free skate.

=== 2021–22 season: Junior Grand Prix medals ===
With the resumption of international junior competition, Ruiter was again given two Junior Grand Prix assignments, this time to both editions of the French Junior Grand Prix, held in consecutive weeks in Courchevel. Notably, Russian skaters could not participate in these two events due to Russia's Sputnik V COVID-19 vaccine not meeting France's standards for adequate vaccination, significantly affecting the women's field given Russian dominance in that discipline in years prior. At the first event, Ruiter was third after the short program, behind Americans Clare Seo and Lindsay Thorngren, but overtook Seo in the free skate and won the silver medal. This was the first JGP medal for a Canadian woman since Gabrielle Daleman's bronze medal in 2013. The following weekend, Ruiter won the bronze medal, becoming the first Canadian woman multi-medallist on the Junior Grand Prix since 2008. She said she was "so proud" of the results.

Following the Junior Grand Prix, Ruiter had planned to compete at the senior level as well, aiming to qualify for the Canadian Olympic team for Beijing. However, she sustained a significant injury in training in November 2021, falling and slicing her calf muscles with the blade of her own skate. She later developed scar tissue problems, and was unable to resume proper training for almost a year.

=== 2022–23 season: International senior debut ===
In her return to international competition, Ruiter made her Challenger series debut at the 2022 CS Ice Challenge in Graz. Sixth after the short program, she rose to second via the free skate, winning the silver medal.

After finishing sixth at Skate Canada Challenge, Ruiter qualified to the 2023 Canadian Championships, her first appearance at the senior level. Sixth in the short program after a jumping error, she went on to win the free skate and rise to second overall. Ruiter called her silver medal result "absolutely incredible." Coach Scott Davis called it "a testament to her daily training," after all the difficulties of the preceding year.

Ruiter was named as Canada's lone women's entry at the 2023 World Junior Championships. The World Junior Championships were held in Ruiter's hometown of Calgary, in the WinSport Arena at Canada Olympic Park, her primary training location. She called it "a dream come true to get to perform not only in front of the home crowd but this is my home rink." Eleventh in the short program, she moved up to tenth after the free skate, and said it was "really special to perform here in front of friends and family." Ruiter's placement guaranteed two spots for Canadian women at the 2024 World Junior Championships.

=== 2023–24 season: National title and Youth Olympics ===
Ruiter began the season by winning the bronze medal at the 2023 Cranberry Cup International. On the Challenger circuit, she won the silver medal at the 2023 CS Autumn Classic International, having come fourth in the short program but then risen to second in the free skate. Ruiter made her Grand Prix debut at the 2023 Skate Canada International and came tenth.

At the Skate Canada Challenge, the final qualifier to the 2024 Canadian Championships, Ruiter finished second. Shortly after this, she was named to the Canadian delegation to the 2024 Winter Youth Olympics. Ruiter said she was "honoured and beyond excited" at the opportunity, noting that "I get to compete on the same ice where my idol, Kaetlyn Osmond, won two Olympic medals."

Competing at the 2024 Canadian Championships in her hometown of Calgary, Ruiter placed second in the short program but won the free skate, edging out two-time Canadian champion, Madeline Schizas, and taking the gold medal. Following the event, Ruiter said, "Just having that skate out there, that just felt like magic to me. That was one of the most special performances I've ever had in my life and just to get to share that with my family and friends and everyone that I love, it's just surreal."

Ruiter was sixth in the short program at the Youth Olympic women's event, but struggles in the free skate saw her twelfth in that segment, dropping to eleventh overall. She admitted that "there were certainly some highlights that I'm really proud of, and it wasn't what I was hoping for." She was part of Team Canada in the team event, coming fourth of five skaters in her segment and contributing to the team's bronze medal win. Ruiter credited the team atmosphere for boosting her performance in comparison to the prior outing, and called wearing an Olympic medal "surreal." At the 2024 World Junior Championships, she finished twenty-first.

=== 2024–25 season ===
In September, Ruiter moved to Toronto to train full-time at the Toronto Cricket, Skating and Curling Club under coaches Brian Orser and Tracy Wilson. Speaking on this move, Ruiter explained, "I spent the past two summers out there and this summer, especially, is when I realized you know what, this fit is kind of what I need right now. The culture, the club, the coaches, the skaters … it just really fits for me right now. I really love it." While Ruiter's father remained in Calgary for his job, her mother and two younger sisters moved to Toronto with her.

Ruiter started the season by competing at the 2024 CS Denis Ten Memorial Challenge, where she finished seventh. She then competed at 2024 Skate Canada International where she would come in eighth place before finishing seventh at the 2024 CS Warsaw Cup the following month. Entering the 2025 Canadian Championships as the defending champion, Ruiter said that retaining the title "would mean the world, but that’s not where I'm trying to focus right now. I'm just trying to focus on training and getting my best stuff out there, and just seeing what happens." She ultimately finished in fourth place, after difficulties in the short program saw her eighth in that segment, before a third-place free skate raised to her within 2.41 points of the bronze medal. Of her free skate, she said: "I was in the mood to fight, and I'm glad that that happened out there."

=== 2025–2026 season ===
Ruiter opened her season in September with a fifth-place finish at the 2025 CS Nebelhorn Trophy. She then went on to win the silver medal at the 2025 Ice Challenge.

In November, Ruiter finished sixth at the 2025 Skate Canada Challenge. Two months later, she placed ninth at the 2026 Canadian Championships.

== Programs ==
Season	Short program	Free skating	Exhibition
2025–2026	Smile By Charlie Chaplin Performed by Kristin Chenoweth choreo. by Joey Russell	Titanic; My Heart Will Go On Performed by 2CELLOS, Kirsty Whalley, Robin Smith, & London Symphony Orchestra; Southampton By James Horner; My Heart Will Go On By Celine Dion choreo. by Joey Russell	
2024–2025	Everybody Wants to Rule the World By Tears for Fears Performed by Cinematic Pop, Spencer Jones & Mckenna Breinholt Choreo. by Julie Marcotte	Wonder Woman; Amazons of Themyscira; Angel on the Wing; Wonder Woman's Wrath; Trafalgar Celebration By Rupert Gregson-Williams Choreo. by David Wilson	
2023–2024	I Wanna Dance with Somebody By Whitney Houston Performed by Rachel Beck; One Last Dance Before I Go By Karl Hugo Choreo. by Jeff Langdon	Inspiration By Florian Christl & The Modern String Quintet Choreo. by David Wilson	Everybody Wants to Rule the World By Tears for Fears Performed by Cinematic Pop, Spencer Jones, & Mckenna Breinholt Choreo. by Julie Marcotte; Ghost Story By Carrie Underwood
2022–2023	I Wanna Dance with Somebody By Whitney Houston Performed by Rachel Beck; One Last Dance Before I Go By Karl Hugo Choreo. by Jeff Langdon	Inspiration By Florian Christl & The Modern String Quintet Choreo. by David Wilson	Giddy Up! By Shania Twain; Time After Time By Cyndi Lauper Performed by Mabel
2020–2022	Opportunity (From Annie) By Sia Choreo. by Jeff Langdon	Mulan; Ancestors By Harry Gregson-Williams; Reflection (Epic Version) By Samuel Kim; Loyal Brave True By Christina Aguilera Choreo. by David Wilson	You Can't Stop the Girl By Bebe Rexha
2019–2020	Oh Heart By Tank and the Bangas Choreo. by Jeff Langdon & Scott Myles	Harry Potter and the Goblet of Fire; Hedwig's Theme By John Williams; The Story Continues; Potter Waltz; The Quidditch World Cup; Hogwarts' Hymn By Patrick Doyle Choreo. by Jeff Langdon & Scott Myles	

== Competitive highlights ==
- GP – Event of the ISU Grand Prix Series
- JGP – Event of the ISU Junior Grand Prix Series
- CS – Event of the ISU Challenger Series
- C – Event was cancelled
- TBD – Assigned
- WD – Withdrew from competition

Competition placements at senior level
Season	2020–21	2022–23	2023–24	2024–25	2025–26
Canadian Championships	C	2nd	1st	4th	9th
GP Skate Canada			10th	8th	
CS Autumn Classic			2nd		
CS Denis Ten Memorial				7th	
CS Ice Challenge		2nd			
CS Nebelhorn Trophy					5th
CS Warsaw Cup				7th	
Cranberry Cup			3rd		
Ice Challenge					2nd
Skate Canada Challenge		6th	2nd		6th

Competition placements at junior level
Season	2019–20	2021–22	2022–23	2023–24
Winter Youth Olympics				11th
Winter Youth Olympics (Team event)				3rd
World Junior Championships	31st		10th	21st
Canadian Championships	1st			
JGP France I		2nd		
JGP France II		3rd		
JGP Italy	6th			
JGP Latvia	11th			
Bavarian Open	1st			
Skate Canada Challenge	1st			

== Detailed results ==
ISU personal best scores in the +5/-5 GOE System
Segment	Type	Score	Event
Total	TSS	179.92	2021 JGP France II
Short program	TSS	64.46	2025 CS Nebelhorn Trophy
Short program	TES	35.43	2021 JGP France II
Short program	PCS	28.73	2023 CS Autumn Classic International
Free skating	TSS	118.10	2021 JGP France I
Free skating	TES	61.59	2021 JGP France I
Free skating	PCS	61.54	2025 CS Nebelhorn Trophy

=== Senior level ===
Results in the 2020–21 season
Date	Event	SP		FS		Total	
Date	Event	P	Score	P	Score	P	Score
Jan 8–17, 2021	2021 Skate Canada Challenge	1	62.91	7	100.26	4	163.17

Results in the 2022–23 season
Date	Event	SP		FS		Total	
Date	Event	P	Score	P	Score	P	Score
Nov 9–13, 2022	(Australia) 2022 CS Ice Challenge	6	55.36	1	117.06	2	172.42
Nov 30 – Dec 2, 2022	2023 Skate Canada Challenge	1	65.86	9	95.40	6	161.26
Jan 9–15, 2023	(Canada) 2023 Canadian Championships	6	59.54	1	128.92	2	189.36

Results in the 2023–24 season
Date	Event	SP		FS		Total	
Date	Event	P	Score	P	Score	P	Score
Aug 9–13, 2023	(Canada) 2023 Cranberry Cup International	5	56.19	5	108.24	3	164.43
Sep 14–17, 2023	(Canada) 2023 CS Autumn Classic International	4	58.87	2	113.81	2	172.68
Oct 27–29, 2023	2023 Skate Canada International	9	55.82	11	99.62	10	155.44
Nov 30 – Dec 3, 2023	2024 Skate Canada Challenge	2	60.22	3	116.20	2	176.42
Jan 8–14, 2024	(Canada) 2024 Canadian Championships	2	58.25	1	122.61	1	180.86

Results in the 2024–25 season
Date	Event	SP		FS		Total	
Date	Event	P	Score	P	Score	P	Score
Oct 3–6, 2024	(Kazakhstan) 2024 CS Denis Ten Memorial Challenge	10	52.78	7	106.97	7	159.75
Oct 25–27, 2024	2024 Skate Canada International	7	57.66	10	104.66	8	162.32
Nov 20–24, 2024	(Poland) 2024 CS Warsaw Cup	12	50.71	2	115.04	7	165.75
Jan 14–19, 2025	(Canada) 2025 Canadian Championships	8	57.17	3	122.24	4	179.41

Results in the 2025–26 season
Date	Event	SP		FS		Total	
Date	Event	P	Score	P	Score	P	Score
Sep 25–27, 2025	(Germany) 2025 CS Nebelhorn Trophy	5	64.46	6	113.98	5	178.44
Nov 5–9, 2025	(Austria) 2025 Ice Challenge	2	59.20	3	113.66	2	172.86
Nov 27–29, 2025	2025 Skate Canada Challenge	4	59.66	7	106.23	6	165.89
Jan 5–11, 2026	(Canada) 2026 Canadian Championships	5	60.78	9	107.84	9	168.62

=== Junior level ===
Results in the 2019–20 season
Date	Event	SP		FS		Total	
Date	Event	P	Score	P	Score	P	Score
Sep 4–7, 2019	2019 JPG Latvia	12	52.96	11	98.17	11	151.13
Oct 2–5, 2019	2019 JPG Italy	5	58.28	6	100.79	6	159.07
Nov 27 – Dec 1, 2019	2020 Skate Canada Challenge	1	59.33	1	110.56	1	169.89
Jan 13–19, 2020	(Canada) 2020 Canadian Championships	1	59.30	1	115.53	1	174.83
Feb 3–9, 2020	(Germany) 2020 Bavarian Open	2	57.71	1	107.51	1	165.22
Mar 2–8, 2020	(Estonia) 2020 World Junior Championships	31	47.27	-	-	31	47.27

Results in the 2021–22 season
Date	Event	SP		FS		Total	
Date	Event	P	Score	P	Score	P	Score
Aug 18–21, 2021	2021 JPG France I	3	59.50	2	118.10	2	177.60
Aug 25–28, 2021	2021 JPG France II	3	63.17	4	116.75	3	179.92

Results in the 2022–23 season
Date	Event	SP		FS		Total	
Date	Event	P	Score	P	Score	P	Score
Feb 27 – Mar 5, 2023	(Canada) 2023 World Junior Championships	11	57.71	11	111.94	10	169.65

Results in the 2023–24 season
Date	Event	SP		FS		Total	
Date	Event	P	Score	P	Score	P	Score
Jan 28–30, 2024	(South Korea) 2024 Winter Youth Olympics	6	58.78	12	96.17	11	154.95
Feb 1, 2024	(South Korea) 2024 Winter Youth Olympics (Team event)	—N/a	—N/a	4	103.41	3	—N/a
Feb 26 – Mar 3, 2024	(Chinese Taipei) 2024 World Junior Championships	19	54.62	20	106.57	21	161.19
