= 2024 Canadian Figure Skating Championships =

- Type: National championship
- Date: January 8–14
- Season: 2023–24
- Location: Calgary, Alberta
- Host: Skate Canada
- Venue: WinSport Arena; Canada Olympic Park

Champions
- Men's singles: Wesley Chiu (S); Terry Yu Tao Jin (J)
- Women's singles: Kaiya Ruiter (S); Lulu Lin (J)
- Pairs: Deanna Stellato-Dudek and Maxime Deschamps (S); Ava Kemp and Yohnatan Elizarov (J)
- Ice dance: Piper Gilles and Paul Poirier (S); Layla Veillon and Alexander Brandys (J)
- Previous: 2023 Canadian Championships
- Next: 2025 Canadian Championships

The 2024 Canadian Figure Skating Championships were held from January 8–14, 2024, at the Canada Olympic Park in Calgary, Alberta. Medals were awarded in men's singles, women's singles, pair skating, and ice dance at the senior and junior levels. The results were part of the Canadian selection criteria for the 2024 World Championships, the 2024 Four Continents Championships, and the 2024 World Junior Championships.

== Entries ==
A list of entries was posted prior to the competition.

=== Senior ===
Senior entries
Men	Women	Pairs	Ice dance
Gabriel Blumenthal	Fiona Bombardier	Fiona Bombardier; Gabriel Farand	Charlie Anderson; Luke Anderson
Damien Bueckert	Breken Brezden	Émy Carignan; Bryan Pierro	Nadiia Bashynska; Peter Beaumont
Wesley Chiu	Marie-France D'Amour	Caidence Derenisky; Raine Eberl	Emmy Bronsard; Jacob Richmond
Stephen Gogolev	Sara-Maude Dupuis	Summer Homick; Marty Haubrich	Alicia Fabbri; Paul Ayer
Alec Guinzbourg	Audréanne Foster	Kelly Ann Laurin; Loucas Éthier	Sandrine Gauthier; Quentin Thieren
Antoine Goyette	Nour-Houda Foura	Lia Pereira; Trennt Michaud	Piper Gilles; Paul Poirier
Mikhail Mogilen	Fée-Ann Landry	Ashlyn Schmitz; Tristan Taylor	Lily Hensen; Nathan Lickers
Rio Morita	Julianne Lussier	Deanna Stellato-Dudek; Maxime Deschamps	Molly Lanaghan; Dmitre Razgulajevs
Matthew Newnham	Cristina Lyons	Elizabeth Thibodeau-Mailhot; Daniel Villene	Marie-Jade Lauriault; Romain Le Gac
Conrad Orzel	Katherine Medland Spence	—N/a	Alyssa Robinson; Jacob Portz
Anthony Paradis	Justine Miclette	—N/a	Haley Sales; Nikolas Wamsteeker
Aleksa Rakic	Marie Maude Pomerleau	—N/a	—N/a
Roman Sadovsky	Natalie Roccatani	—N/a	—N/a
Ethan Scott	Kaiya Ruiter	—N/a	—N/a
Bruce Waddell	Madeline Schizas	—N/a	—N/a
—N/a	Hetty Shi	—N/a	—N/a
—N/a	Uliana Shiryaeva	—N/a	—N/a
—N/a	Rose Théroux	—N/a	—N/a

=== Junior ===
Junior entries
Men	Women	Pairs	Ice dance
David Bondar	Calissa Adlem	Martina Ariano Kent; Charly Laliberté Laurent	Nicole Bolender; Aiden Dotzert
William Chan	Stavrina Aranitis	Annika Behnke; Kole Sauve	Victoria Carandiuc; Andrei Carandiuc
Jacob Cote	Ashley Dinh	Beau Callahan; Christophe Roch	Charlotte Chung; Axel MacKenzie
Jake Ellis	Mély-Ann Gagner	Natalia Custodio; Christopher Hammer	Auréa Cinçon-Debout; Earl Jesse Celestino
Vladimir Furman	Natasha Hewitt	Jazmine Desrochers; Kieran Thrasher	Jamie Fournier; Everest Zhu
David Howes	Gabrielle Jugnauth	Ava Kemp; Yohnatan Elizarov	Audra Gans; Michael Boutsan
Terry Yu Tao Jin	Michelle Lee	Noémie Rolland; Étienne Lacasse	Sophia Gover; Billy Wilson-French
John Kim	Lulu Lin	Julia Quattrocchi; Simon Desmarais	Alisa Korneva; Kieran MacDonald
Etienne Lacasse	Reese Rose	Megan Yudin; Aidan Wright	Caroline Kravets; Jacob Stark
Herman Lau	Emily Sales	—N/a	Savanna Martel; William Oddson
Julien Lévesque	Kassidy Sinclair	—N/a	Chloé Mentha; Émile Deveau
David Li	Alessia Taddeo	—N/a	Chloe Nguyen; Brendan Giang
Grayson Long	Mégane Vallières	—N/a	Addison Pehl; Daniel Yu
Christopher Manis	Valeria Veprjitska	—N/a	Dana Sabatini-Speciale; Nicholas Buelow
Liam Schmidt	Aleksa Volkova	—N/a	Layla Veillon; Alexander Brandys
David Shteyngart	Megan Woodley	—N/a	—N/a
Neo Tran	Lucille Yang	—N/a	—N/a
Brennan Webb	Kara Yun	—N/a	—N/a

=== Changes to preliminary assignments ===
Date	Discipline	Withdrew	Notes	Ref.
January 5, 2024	Senior pairs	Brooke McIntosh; Benjamin Mimar	Injury (McIntosh)	
January 8, 2024	Senior ice dance	Marjorie Lajoie; Zachary Lagha	Concussion (Lajoie)	
January 9, 2024	Senior ice dance	Laurence Fournier Beaudry; Nikolaj Sørensen	Sørensen is under investigation for sexual assault.	
January 12, 2024	Senior men	Shohei Law		
January 12, 2024	Senior men	Dominic Rondeau		

== Medal summary ==
=== Senior results ===
Discipline	Gold	Silver	Bronze
Men	Wesley Chiu	Aleksa Rakic	Anthony Paradis
Women	Kaiya Ruiter	Madeline Schizas	Hetty Shi
Pairs	Deanna Stellato-Dudek; Maxime Deschamps	Lia Pereira; Trennt Michaud	Kelly Ann Laurin; Loucas Éthier
Ice dance	Piper Gilles; Paul Poirier	Marie-Jade Lauriault; Romain Le Gac	Alicia Fabbri; Paul Ayer

=== Junior results ===
Discipline	Gold	Silver	Bronze
Men	Terry Yu Tao Jin	David Li	David Shteyngart
Women	Lulu Lin	Aleksa Volkova	Mély-Ann Gagner
Pairs	Ava Kemp; Yohnatan Elizarov	Martina Ariano Kent; Charly Laliberté Laurent	Jazmine Desrochers; Kieran Thrasher
Ice dance	Layla Veillon; Alexander Brandys	Chloe Nguyen; Brendan Giang	Alisa Korneva; Kieran MacDonald

== Senior results ==
=== Men's singles ===
Men's results
Rank	Skater	Total	SP		FS	
1st place, gold medalist(s)	Wesley Chiu	232.15	1	88.98	3	143.17
2nd place, silver medalist(s)	Aleksa Rakic	225.39	2	75.49	1	149.90
3rd place, bronze medalist(s)	Anthony Paradis	209.98	3	74.16	5	135.82
4	Conrad Orzel	209.72	10	61.72	2	148.00
5	Matthew Newnham	206.26	5	71.96	6	134.30
6	Roman Sadovsky	204.94	7	68.29	4	136.65
7	Rio Morita	199.19	6	70.46	8	128.73
8	Alec Guinzbourg	192.24	9	62.31	7	129.93
9	Mikhail Mogilen	187.32	4	72.88	11	114.44
10	Bruce Waddell	187.03	8	65.86	9	121.17
11	Damien Bueckert	162.42	11	59.48	12	102.94
12	Antoine Goyette	161.30	15	45.71	10	115.59
13	Ethan Scott	137.47	14	48.15	13	89.32
WD	Gabriel Blumenthal	WD	12	58.72	Withdrew from competition	
WD	Stephen Gogolev	WD	13	53.80	Withdrew from competition	

=== Women's singles ===
Women's results
Rank	Skater	Total	SP		FS	
1st place, gold medalist(s)	Kaiya Ruiter	180.86	2	58.25	1	122.61
2nd place, silver medalist(s)	Madeline Schizas	172.90	1	63.63	3	109.27
3rd place, bronze medalist(s)	Hetty Shi	162.51	6	52.31	2	110.20
4	Uliana Shiryaeva	159.29	5	53.20	5	106.09
5	Fée-Ann Landry	157.69	7	51.05	4	106.64
6	Sara-Maude Dupuis	157.64	3	57.87	7	99.77
7	Audréanne Foster	152.21	4	53.22	9	98.99
8	Justine Miclette	150.38	8	50.75	8	99.63
9	Rose Théroux	149.24	11	49.07	6	100.17
10	Marie Maude Pomerleau	148.06	9	50.55	10	97.51
11	Marie-France D'Amour	142.40	10	49.60	13	92.80
12	Cristina Lyons	137.46	12	48.56	14	88.90
13	Katherine Medland Spence	135.74	16	41.71	11	94.03
14	Nour-Houda Foura	133.73	13	47.58	15	86.15
15	Natalie Roccatani	133.28	17	39.61	12	93.67
16	Fiona Bombardier	122.37	14	44.91	17	77.46
17	Julianne Lussier	116.09	18	35.29	16	80.80
18	Breken Brezden	113.23	15	44.76	18	68.47

=== Pairs ===
Pairs' results
Rank	Team	Total	SP		FS	
1st place, gold medalist(s)	Deanna Stellato-Dudek; Maxime Deschamps	205.79	1	66.86	1	138.93
2nd place, silver medalist(s)	Lia Pereira; Trennt Michaud	193.14	2	66.04	2	127.10
3rd place, bronze medalist(s)	Kelly Ann Laurin; Loucas Éthier	187.40	3	62.21	3	125.19
4	Elizabeth Thibodeau-Mailhot; Daniel Villeneuve	140.18	6	47.32	4	92.86
5	Fiona Bombardier; Gabriel Farand	137.77	5	50.88	6	86.89
6	Émy Carignan; Bryan Pierro	135.38	4	53.11	8	82.27
7	Caidence Derenisky; Raine Eberl	132.53	7	44.06	5	88.47
8	Summer Homick; Marty Haubrich	130.40	8	43.78	7	86.62
9	Ashlyn Schmitz; Tristan Taylor	120.60	9	42.78	9	77.82

=== Ice dance ===
Ice dance results
Rank	Team	Total	RD		FD	
1st place, gold medalist(s)	Piper Gilles; Paul Poirier	222.95	1	86.78	1	136.17
2nd place, silver medalist(s)	Marie-Jade Lauriault; Romain Le Gac	200.50	2	78.00	2	122.50
3rd place, bronze medalist(s)	Alicia Fabbri; Paul Ayer	195.61	3	77.75	3	117.86
4	Lily Hensen; Nathan Lickers	176.62	7	66.12	4	110.50
5	Molly Lanaghan; Dmitre Razgulajevs	175.48	5	69.86	6	105.62
6	Nadiia Bashynska; Peter Beaumont	175.02	4	75.64	8	99.38
7	Emmy Bronsard; Jacob Richmond	172.73	6	66.85	5	105.88
8	Haley Sales; Nikolas Wamsteeker	165.63	8	63.95	7	101.68
9	Alyssa Robinson; Jacob Portz	157.57	10	61.61	9	95.96
10	Sandrine Gauthier; Quentin Thieren	154.81	9	61.91	10	92.90
11	Charlie Anderson; Luke Anderson	118.07	11	44.23	11	73.84

== Junior results ==
=== Men's singles ===
Men's results
Rank	Skater	Total	SP		FS	
1st place, gold medalist(s)	Terry Yu Tao Jin	185.20	4	65.22	1	119.98
2nd place, silver medalist(s)	David Li	179.45	6	61.72	2	117.73
3rd place, bronze medalist(s)	David Shteyngart	175.40	3	65.65	5	109.75
4	David Howes	174.11	7	60.08	3	114.03
5	William Chan	173.79	5	64.74	6	109.05
6	John Kim	172.52	1	67.79	8	104.73
7	Grayson Long	168.58	8	56.26	4	112.32
8	David Bondar	168.43	2	67.45	9	168.43
9	Jake Ellis	152.42	14	47.62	7	104.80
10	Neo Tran	139.49	9	56.26	12	83.23
11	Vladimir Furman	138.97	10	51.05	10	87.92
12	Étienne Lacasse	130.73	15	44.65	11	86.08
13	Liam Schmidt	127.75	12	48.41	13	79.34
14	Julien Lévesque	123.91	13	47.85	16	76.06
15	Jacob Côté	120.76	16	43.53	14	77.23
16	Christopher Manis	119.33	17	42.25	15	77.08
17	Brennan Webb	112.83	11	48.46	17	64.37
WD	Herman Lau	WD	18	35.56	Withdrew from competition	

=== Women's singles ===
Women's results
Rank	Skater	Total	SP		FS	
1st place, gold medalist(s)	Lulu Lin	166.74	3	56.58	1	110.16
2nd place, silver medalist(s)	Aleksa Volkova	158.00	2	57.13	2	100.87
3rd place, bronze medalist(s)	Mély-Ann Gagner	147.87	8	48.34	3	99.53
4	Reese Rose	147.87	4	52.41	5	95.46
5	Stavrina Aranitis	147.69	5	50.43	4	97.26
6	Megan Woodley	145.51	1	59.15	8	86.36
7	Lucille Yang	140.05	6	49.03	7	91.02
8	Michelle Lee	139.01	10	47.05	6	91.96
9	Kara Yun	129.61	9	47.15	9	82.46
10	Mégane Vallières	128.70	7	48.74	11	79.96
11	Gabrielle Jugnauth	122.61	11	44.95	13	77.66
12	Valeria Veprjitska	121.09	12	44.36	14	76.73
13	Calissa Adlem	120.96	18	39.32	10	81.64
14	Natasha Hewitt	120.30	15	41.01	12	79.29
15	Ashley Dinh	118.32	14	41.70	15	76.62
16	Kassidy Sinclair	116.07	13	42.10	16	73.97
17	Alessia Taddeo	114.45	17	40.70	17	73.75
18	Emily Sales	107.86	16	40.79	18	67.07

=== Pairs ===
Pairs' results
Rank	Team	Total	SP		FS	
1st place, gold medalist(s)	Ava Kemp; Yohnatan Elizarov	165.50	1	60.45	1	105.05
2nd place, silver medalist(s)	Martina Ariano Kent; Charly Laliberté Laurent	149.44	3	49.74	2	99.70
3rd place, bronze medalist(s)	Jazmine Desrochers; Kieran Thrasher	149.24	2	51.54	3	97.70
4	Julia Quattrocchi; Simon Desmarais	127.90	4	46.77	4	81.13
5	Noémie Rolland; Étienne Lacasse	126.58	5	46.67	5	79.91
6	Beau Callahan; Christophe Roch	125.13	6	45.83	6	79.30
7	Annika Behnke; Kole Sauve	116.66	7	44.09	7	72.57
8	Megan Yudin; Aidan Wright	103.17	8	40.90	9	62.27
9	Natalia Custodio; Christopher Hammer	94.74	9	31.39	8	63.35

=== Ice dance ===
Ice dance results
Rank	Team	Total	RD		FD	
1st place, gold medalist(s)	Layla Veillon; Alexander Brandys	160.80	2	64.41	1	96.39
2nd place, silver medalist(s)	Chloe Nguyen; Brendan Giang	154.25	1	67.06	3	87.19
3rd place, bronze medalist(s)	Alisa Korneva; Kieran MacDonald	147.00	4	57.97	2	89.03
4	Jamie Fournier; Everest Zhu	143.63	3	58.67	4	84.96
5	Savanna Martel; William Oddson	141.69	5	57.95	5	83.74
6	Dana Sabatini-Speciale; Nicholas Buelow	138.79	6	55.27	6	83.52
7	Sophia Gover; Billy Wilson-French	129.32	7	53.50	8	75.82
8	Auréa Cinçon-Debout; Earl Jesse Celestino	127.43	9	50.70	7	76.73
9	Nicole Bolender; Aiden Dotzert	125.58	8	50.90	9	74.68
10	Audra Gans; Michael Boutsan	124.62	10	50.46	10	74.16
11	Addison Pehl; Daniel Yu	122.53	11	49.44	11	73.09
12	Caroline Kravets; Jacob Stark	118.29	12	49.30	12	68.99
13	Victoria Carandiuc; Andrei Carandiuc	110.13	13	47.27	13	62.86
14	Charlotte Chung; Axel MacKenzie	106.30	14	45.33	15	60.97
15	Chloé Mentha; Émile Deveau	104.57	15	42.03	14	62.54

== International team selections ==
=== Four Continents Championships ===
The 2024 Four Continents Championships were held from January 30 to February 4 in Shanghai, China. Teams were selected using the International Teams Selection Criteria.

No.	Men	Women	Pairs	Ice dance
1	Wesley Chiu	Sara-Maude Dupuis	Kelly Ann Laurin; Loucas Éthier	Laurence Fournier Beaudry; Nikolaj Soerensen
2	Conrad Orzel	Justine Miclette	Lia Pereira; Trennt Michaud	Marjorie Lajoie; Zachary Lagha; (withdrew)
3	Roman Sadovsky	Madeline Schizas	Deanna Stellato-Dudek; Maxime Deschamps	Piper Gilles; Paul Poirier

Alternates

No.	Men	Women	Pairs	Ice dance
1	Matthew Newnham	—N/a		Marie-Jade Lauriault; Romain Le Gac; (called up)
2	—N/a	—N/a		Alicia Fabbri; Paul Ayer
3	—N/a	—N/a		Nadiia Bashynska; Peter Beaumont

=== World Junior Championships ===
The 2024 World Junior Championships were held from February 26 to March 3 in Taipei, Taiwan. Teams were selected using the International Teams Selection Criteria.

No.	Men	Women	Pairs	Ice dance
1	Anthony Paradis	Lulu Lin	Ava Kemp; Yohnatan Elizarov	Alisa Korneva; Kieran MacDonald
2	Aleksa Rakic	Kaiya Ruiter	Martina Ariano Kent; Charly Laliberté Laurent	Chloe Nguyen; Brendan Giang
3	—N/a			Layla Veillon; Alexander Brandys

Alternates

No.	Men	Women	Pairs	Ice dance
1	Rio Morita	Hetty Shi	Jazmine Desrochers; Kieran Thrasher	Jamie Fournier; Everest Zhu
2	Alec Guinzbourg	Uliana Shiryaeva	Beau Callahan; Christophe Roch	Savanna Martel; William Oddson

=== World Championships ===
The 2024 World Championships were held from March 18–24 in Montreal, Quebec. Teams were selected using the International Teams Selection Criteria.

No.	Men	Women	Pairs	Ice dance
1	Wesley Chiu	Madeline Schizas	Kelly Ann Laurin; Loucas Éthier	Laurence Fournier Beaudry; Nikolaj Sørensen
2	Roman Sadovsky	—N/a	Lia Pereira; Trennt Michaud	Piper Gilles; Paul Poirier
3	—N/a	—N/a	Deanna Stellato-Dudek; Maxime Deschamps	Marjorie Lajoie; Zachary Lagha

Alternates

No.	Men	Women	Pairs	Ice dance
1	Aleksa Rakic	—N/a		Marie-Jade Lauriault; Romain Le Gac
2	Conrad Orzel	—N/a		Alicia Fabbri; Paul Ayer
3	Matthew Newnham	—N/a		—N/a
