= Noah Lafornara =

American-Italian ice dancer (born 2004)

Personal information
- Full name: Noah Elias Lafornara
- Born: December 2, 2004 (age 21) Buffalo, New York, U.S.
- Home town: Milan, Italy
- Height: 5 ft 11 in (1.80 m)

Figure skating career
- Country: Italy (since 2023); United States (2021–23)
- Discipline: Ice dance
- Partner: Noemi Tali (since 2023); Romy Malcolm (2021–23)
- Coach: Valter Rizzo; Brunhilde Bianchi; Denis Petukhov; Melissa Gregory
- Skating club: Icelab Bergamo
- Began skating: 2008

Medal record
Italian Championships
Bronze medal – third place	2026 Bergamo	Ice dance
World Junior Championships
Gold medal – first place	2025 Debrecen	Ice dance
Junior Grand Prix Final
Gold medal – first place	2024–25 Grenoble	Ice dance

Noah Elias Lafornara (born December 2, 2004) is an American-Italian ice dancer who currently competes for Italy. With his current skating partner, Noemi Tali, he is the 2025 World Junior champion, the 2024–25 Junior Grand Prix Final champion, a two-time ISU Junior Grand Prix gold medalist, and a two-time Italian junior national champion (2024–25).

== Personal life ==
Lafornara was born on December 2, 2004 in Buffalo, New York to parents Jeannie and Tony. He has two brothers, Anthony and Nicholas.

== Career ==
=== Early years ===
Lafornara began learning how to skate in 2008. He was introduced to the sport by his mother, a figure skating coach, and initially began as a freestyle skater. He began testing pattern dances at first as a way to improve his skills as a singles skater, but eventually chose to transition to ice dance full time. He had a short-lived early dance partnership with Gabriela Hernandez, with whom he placed 10th in the novice category at the 2019 U.S. Ice Dance Final.

Lafornara teamed up with Canadian skater Romy Malcolm in February 2020 after their respective coaches met at the 2020 Bavarian Open and suggested the two try out together. However, their training was quickly put on hold due to COVID-19-related lockdown policies, and the pair trained separately from March to September of that year. Due to insufficient practice time, the team and their coaches made the decision to sit out the 2020–21 competitive season.

Malcolm/Lafornara made their competitive debut in 2021 in the U.S. Figure Skating Championship Series, the qualifying events to the U.S. Figure Skating Championships. They earned a slot in the junior ice dance category at the 2022 U.S. Figure Skating Championships, where they finished 6th. The team received a Junior Grand Prix assignment early the following season, the 2022 JGP Poland where they placed 9th. The event would be their last competition together as Malcolm and Lafornara chose to dissolve their partnership not long after.

=== 2023–24 season: Debut of Tali/Lafornara ===
After several months without a skating partner, Lafornara was offered a tryout with Italian skater Noemi Tali, who'd ended her partnership with Stefano Frasca not long after the 2023 Junior World Championships. The two agreed to team up for Italy in March 2023 after just two days of skating together, and made the decision to split their training between Tali's coaches, Valter Rizzo and Brunhilde Bianchi in Milan during the competitive season, and Lafornara's coaches, Denis Petukhov and Melissa Gregory in Connecticut during the off-season.

Tali/Lafornara made their international junior debut in October 2023 at the 2023 JGP Armenia. There they won the bronze medal, finishing behind Israeli skaters Tkachenko/Kiliakov and U.S. sibling team Peal/Peal. This was the first JGP medal for an Italian dance team since the 2009–10 circuit, when Alessandrini/Vaturi won silver at the 2009 JGP Germany. While the team did not receive a second JGP assignment, their success continued with podium placements at three international junior B events over the course of October and November. At the 2024 Italian Figure Skating Championships in December, Tali/Lafornara took the junior dance title handily over Ventura/Frasca and Petracchi/Basile.

Due to their success at the national championships, Tali/Lafornara were assigned to compete at the 2024 World Junior Championships in Taipei. There the team placed fourth in the rhythm dance with a new personal best score of 62.58. They encountered problems in the free dance, taking a one-point deduction for an extended lift and both falling on their ending pose, and fell to seventh overall after coming ninth in the segment. They expressed disappointment afterward, though Lafornara added that it "was a good event for us, and we had a good season."

=== 2024–25 season: Undefeated season, World Junior champion and Junior Grand Prix Final gold ===
Due to ISU revision of the age criteria for junior skaters, Tali and Lafornara were able to participate in another junior season. They began their second season together on the Junior Grand Prix with a win at the 2024 JGP Latvia. At their second JGP assignment, the 2024 JGP Thailand, Tali and Lafornara again took the title. With their two wins in hand, Tali/Lafornara became the first ice dance team to qualify to the 2024–25 JGP Final. They subsequently competed on the junior level at the 2024 Mezzaluna Cup and the 2024 Ice Challenge, winning gold at both events.

In December, the duo entered the Junior Grand Prix Final as the top qualifiers and title favourites. They won the rhythm dance with a margin of more than three points over second-place Americans Wolfkostin/Tsarevski. Winning the free dance as well, they took the gold medal, becoming the first Italian dance team to win the Final since Federica Faiella and Luciano Milo had done so 27 years earlier in the first edition. Tali said they were "proud of what we did and hope to do even better in the future." Two weeks later they claimed their second national gold at the 2025 Italian Junior Championships.

Tali/Lafornara entered the 2025 World Junior Championships in Debrecen as the title favourites, and won the rhythm dance with a 70.92 score. In the free dance they set another new personal best (106.58) and took the gold medal by a margin of 9.99 points over Wolfkostin/Tsarevski. They were the first Italian dance team to win the Junior World title. Prior to the event, the team shared that Lafornara tore a muscle two months ago that forced him off the ice for four weeks. Lafornara said that "I honestly don't know how to put it into words what it feels like." The team announced that they intended to move up to the senior ranks the following season, in the hopes of participating in the 2026 Winter Olympics to be held in Italy.

=== 2025–26 season: Senior debut ===
Initially assigned to make their senior international debut at the 2025 CS Lombardia Trophy, Tali/Lafornara were forced to withdraw due to Lafornara sustaining an injury prior to the event. They subsequently withdrew from the 2025 CS Nepela Memorial, the 2025 CS Trialeti Trophy, and 2025 Skate America as well.

=== 2026–27 season ===
Tali/Lafornara began their season placing 4th at the 2026 Kinoshita Group Cup.

== Programs ==
=== Ice dance with Noemi Tali (for Italy) ===
Season	Rhythm dance	Free dance	Exhibition
2023–24	Just an Illusion by Imagination; It's Raining Men by The Weather Girls choreo. by Stefano Atti, Massimo Scali	Who Wants to Live Forever performed by The Tenors choreo. by Stefano Atti, Massimo Scali	
2024–25	How Deep Is Your Love; You Should Be Dancing by the Bee Gees choreo. by Massimo Scali, Stefano Atti	(Where Do I Begin?) Love Story performed by Lola Astanova & Stjepan Hauser choreo. by Massimo Scali, Stefano Atti	Red Notice (from Red Notice) by Steve Jablonsky; Love Will Lead You Back by Taylor Dayne
2025–26	Think About the Way by Ice MC & Roberto Zanetti; The Rhythm of the Night by Corona, Annerley Emma Gordon, Giorgio Spagna, Pete Glenister, & Mike Gaffey; Baby Baby by Corona & Antonia Bottari; No Limit by 2 Unlimited, Phil Wilde, & Jean-Paul De Coster choreo. by Denis Pethukov, Oksana Grishuk, Enio Cordoba, Stefano Atti	Requiem in D Minor, K. 626: I. Introitus: Requiem by Wolfgang Amadeus Mozart performed by Sylvia McNair, Academy of St Martin in the Fields, & Neville Marriner; Lacrimosa by Wolfgang Amadeus Mozart performed by David Garrett & Franck van der Heijden choreo. by Denis Pethukov, Oksana Grishuk, Enio Cordoba, Stefano Atti	
2026–27		Anna’s Theme (The Red Violin soundtrack) by Joshua Bell, Alexys Schwartz, Philharmonia Orchestra, Esa-Pekka Salonen, John Corigliano; Elsgie: O doux printemps d’autrefois by Joshua Bell; Michael Stern; Academy of St Martin in the Fields, Craig Leon; The Red Violin: Chaconne for Violin and Orchestra by Joshua Bell; Philharmonia Orchestra, Esa-Pekka Salonen, John Corigliano	

=== Ice dance with Romy Malcolm (for the United States) ===
Season	Rhythm dance	Free dance
2022–23	Tango: Así se baila el tango by Bailongo!, feat. Vero Verdier; Flamenco: Cantaré by Pitbull, feat. Lenier choreo. by Melissa Gregory, Denis Petukhov, and Enio Cordoba	Epilogue: You and I/The Story of Chess (from Chess) performed by Elaine Paige and Tommy Körberg choreo. by Melissa Gregory, Denis Petukhov, and Enio Cordoba

== Competitive highlights ==
- GP – Event of the ISU Grand Prix Series
- JGP – Event of the ISU Junior Grand Prix Series
- CS – Event of the ISU Challenger Series
- TBD – Assigned
- WD – Withdrew from competition

=== Ice dance with Noemi Tali (for Italy) ===
Competition placements at senior level
Season	2025–26	2026–27
Italian Championships	3rd	
GP Skate America		8th
GP Skate Canada		7th
CS Golden Spin of Zagreb	9th	
CS Lombardia Trophy		5th
CS Kinoshita Cup		4th
CS Budapest Trophy		5th

Competition placements at junior level
Season	2023–24	2024–25
World Junior Championships	7th	1st
Junior Grand Prix Final		1st
Italian Championships	1st	1st
JGP Armenia	3rd	
JGP Latvia		1st
JGP Thailand		1st
Bavarian Open	5th	
Egna Dance Trophy	1st	
Ice Challenge		1st
Mezzaluna Cup	3rd	1st
NRW Trophy	1st	
Pavel Roman Memorial	2nd	

=== Ice dance with Romy Malcolm (for the United States) ===
Competition placements at junior level
Season	2021–22	2022–23
U.S. Championships	9th	
JGP Poland		9th

== Detailed results ==
=== With Tali ===
ISU personal best scores in the +5/-5 GOE System
Segment	Type	Score	Event
Total	TSS	177.50	2025 World Junior Championships
Rhythm dance	TSS	71.09	2026 CS Kinoshita Group Cup
Rhythm dance	TES	40.23	2026 CS Kinoshita Group Cup
Rhythm dance	PCS	31.07	2025 World Junior Championships
Free dance	TSS	106.58	2025 World Junior Championships
Free dance	TES	57.30	2025 World Junior Championships
Free dance	PCS	49.28	2025 World Junior Championships

=== Senior level ===
Results in the 2025–26 season
Date	Event	SP		FS		Total	
Date	Event	P	Score	P	Score	P	Score
Dec 3-6, 2025	(Croatia) 2025 CS Golden Spin of Zagreb	13	57.95	7	101.28	9	159.23
Dec 17-20, 2025	(Italy) 2026 Italian Championships	3	70.35	3	106.28	3	176.63

Results in the 2026–27 season
Date	Event	SP		FS		Total	
Date	Event	P	Score	P	Score	P	Score
Sep 4–6, 2026	(Japan) 2026 CS Kinoshita Group Cup	5	71.09	3	104.34	4	175.43
Sep 17–20, 2026	(Italy) 2026 CS Lombardia Trophy	7	63.88	5	100.23	5	164.11
Oct 15–18, 2026	(Hungary) 2026 CS Budapest Trophy	7	69.51	3	106.08	5	175.59
Oct 30 - Nov 1, 2026	2026 Skate Canada International	8	62.79	7	95.58	7	158.37
Nov 13–15, 2026	(United States) 2026 Skate America	7	67.84	8	94.84	8	162.68

=== Junior level ===
2024–2025 season
Date	Event	RD	FD	Total
February 28 – March 2, 2025	2025 World Junior Championships	1; 70.92	1; 106.58	1; 177.50
December 19–21, 2024	2025 Italian Junior Championships	1; 74.57	1; 108.98	1; 183.55
December 5–7, 2024	2024–25 JGP Final	1; 68.66	1; 101.32	1; 169.98
November 5–10, 2024	2024 Ice Challenge	1; 66.91	1; 104.29	1; 171.20
October 25–27, 2024	2024 Mezzaluna Cup	1; 70.86	1; 102.87	1; 173.73
September 11–14, 2024	2024 JGP Thailand	1; 68.80	1; 100.67	1; 169.47
August 28–31, 2024	2024 JGP Latvia	1; 62.95	1; 98.31	1; 161.26
2023–2024 season
Date	Event	RD	FD	Total
February 26 – March 3, 2024	2024 World Junior Championships	4; 62.58	9; 85.99	7; 148.57
February 8–11, 2024	2024 Egna Dance Trophy	1; 69.38	1; 101.01	1; 170.39
January 30–February 4, 2024	2024 Bavarian Open	2; 59.43	8; 74.07	5; 133.50
December 10–14, 2023	2024 Italian Junior Championships	1; 59.17	1; 98.55	1; 157.72
November 16–19, 2023	2023 NRW Trophy	2; 62.71	1; 93.11	1; 155.82
November 10–12, 2023	2023 Pavel Roman Memorial	2; 64.20	1; 92.41	2; 156.61
October 20–22, 2023	2023 Mezzaluna Cup	3; 58.92	2; 94.40	3; 153.32
October 4–7, 2023	2023 JGP Armenia	4; 52.79	3; 93.25	3; 146.04
