= Yohnatan Elizarov =

Canadian competitive pairs skater

Personal information
- Full name: Yohnatan Elizarov
- Born: 2 December 2003 (age 22) Haifa, Israel
- Home town: Winnipeg, Manitoba, Canada
- Height: 178 cm (5 ft 10 in)

Figure skating career
- Country: Canada
- Coach: Kevin Dawe, Lee Barkell
- Skating club: Granite Club
Medal record
Figure skating: Pairs skating
Representing Canada
World Junior Championships
Gold medal – first place	2026 Tallinn	Pairs
Junior Grand Prix Final
Silver medal – second place	2023–24 Beijing	Pairs
Bronze medal – third place	2025–26 Nagoya	Pairs

Yohnatan Elizarov (born 2 December 2003) is a Canadian pair skater. With his skating partner, Ava Kemp, he is the 2026 World Junior champion, 2023–24 Junior Grand Prix Final silver medallist, 2025–26 Junior Grand Prix Final bronze medallist, four-time ISU Junior Grand Prix medallist, and two-time Canadian junior champion (2024–25).

Kemp/Elizarov are the first Canadian pairs team to win the World Junior Championships since Barbara Underhill and Paul Martini in 1978.

== Personal life ==
Elizarov was born in Haifa, Israel in 2003 to his parents German and Elena. His mother, Elena, had skated in Russia as a child until moving to Israel. He has two younger brothers, Sean and Jamie.

The family moved to Winnipeg, Manitoba in 2009, when Elizarov was five years old.

Elizarov attended high school at Vincent Massey Secondary School, where he graduated in 2021. He is currently a computer science student at the University of Manitoba.

== Career ==
=== Early Years ===
Elizarov began skating at 6 years old after his mother enrolled him in CanSkate. Elizarov first began skating in men's singles, qualifying for the 2022 Canadian Junior Championships and placing ninth. That same season, Elizarov formed a partnership with Ava Kemp and won the 2022 Canadian Novice title.

=== 2022-23 season: Junior Grand Prix silver ===
Kemp/Elizarov made their junior international debut at the 2022 JGP Latvia, winning the silver medal. After the event, Elizarov stated “It’s very hard to believe. I think we had like 15 points in total over our personal best. It was a great, great competition.” At their second Junior Grand Prix event, 2022 JGP Poland II, they placed fifth, qualifying the team for the 2022-23 Junior Grand Prix Final. However, Kemp/Elizarov later withdrew from the event after an injury from Kemp.

At the 2023 Canadian Junior Championships, Kemp/Elizarov placed second in the short program and third in the free skate, finishing second overall. Afterwards, the team was named to the 2023 World Junior Championships team. At the World Junior Championships, they placed sixth with a score of 149.03, an almost twenty-point improvement over their previous personal best score. Shortly after the competition, Elizarov suffered a sudden lung collapse which required surgery. Additionally, Kemp suffered from a back injury, delaying their training for the next season.

=== 2023-24 season: Junior Grand Prix Final silver ===
In the Summer of 2023, Kemp/Elizarov relocated from Winnipeg to Toronto in order to follow their longtime coach, Kevin Dawe.

Kemp/Elizarov competed twice on the 2023–24 ISU Junior Grand Prix series, placing fourth at the 2023 JGP Hungary and first at the 2023 JGP Poland. With these results, Kemp/Elizarov qualified for the 2023–24 Junior Grand Prix Final. There, Kemp/Elizarov finished second overall and earned personal best scores in all segments.

At the 2024 Canadian Junior Championships, Kemp/Elizarov earned their first junior national title, beating the second placed team by over 15 points. The team subsequently competed at the 2024 World Junior Championships and placed 6th after falling three times in the free skate.

=== 2024-25 Season: Injury & Return to competition ===
Kemp/Elizarov missed the 2024-25 ISU Junior Grand Prix series due to a back injury from Kemp. Returning from injury in December, Kemp/Elizarov competed at the 2024-25 Skate Canada Challenge, the qualifying competition for the Canadian National Championships. Afterwards, Kemp shared “The last couple of months, it’s just been a really slow build, slowly adding elements back in. We’re pretty much training all the elements in practice.” At the 2025 Canadian Junior Championships, Kemp/Elizarov successfully defended their title. The pair then competed at the 2025 Bavairan Open, where they won the competition and earned the minimum technical score needed to compete at the 2025 World Junior Championships. At the World Junior Championships, Kemp/Elizarov placed 10th.

=== 2025–2026 season: World Junior champion and senior debut ===
Kemp/Elizarov won gold at both the 2025 JGP Latvia and 2025 JGP Turkey, setting personal best scores at both competitions. As a result, the pair qualified for the 2025-26 Junior Grand Prix Final.

The pair made their senior international debut at the 2025 Ice Challenge, where they finished third and earned the technical minimum scores required to compete at both the Four Continents Championships and World Championships.

At the Junior Grand Prix Final, the pair placed third in the short program and fourth in the free skate, ultimately finishing third. "We’re disappointed with our free skate today... Still, we made it onto the podium, so it’s encouraging to win the bronze medal,” Kemp stated afterwards.

Kemp/Elizarov elected to compete at the senior level at the 2026 Canadian National Championships, placing fourth overall. As a result, the team was named to Canada's 2026 Four Continents Championships team. At the Four Continents Championships, Kemp/Elizarov placed 8th. Speaking on their experience at the competition, Elizarov stated “The short program didn’t go as planned because my boot actually broke during the six-minute warm-up, so I didn’t really go for the salchow during the short program... It was a big learning experience for everything that is to come, also for situations when things don’t go to plan.”

Kemp/Elizarov ended their season at the 2026 World Junior Championships. Second in the short program and first in the free skate, Kemp/Elizarov ultimately win the title, becoming the first Canadian pairs team to win the World Junior Championships since Barbara Underhill and Paul Martini in 1978. On their achievement, Kemp stated “I think that means everything to us, because Barbara and Paul—we actually met them last year. They used to skate or train in the same club, and they came to our ice show and watched us, and we talked with them a bit. Also, our choreographer Sandra (Bezic) worked with them, and we have one move in our long program that is for them, so it actually means a lot.”

== Programs ==
- Program details mentioned at first occurrence

Competition programs by season
Season	Short program	Free skate program
2022-23	Anything You Can Do: Performed by Bernadette Peters, Tom Wopat	Never Enough: From the Greatest Showman; Performed by Loren Allred
2023-24	Monde Inversé: Performed by Cirque du Soleil	Medley: 1. Writing's on the Wall; From Spectre; Performed by Sam Smith; 2. Skyfall; From Skyfall; Performed by Adele
2024-25	Succession: Composed by Nicholas Britell	"Bohemian Rhapsody": Performed by Queen, Freddie Mercury
2025-26	Succession	"Clair de Lune": Composed by Claude Debussy

== Competitive highlights ==
=== Pair skating with Ava Kemp ===
- GP - Event of the ISU Grand Prix Series
- JGP – Event of the ISU Junior Grand Prix Series
- CS - Event of the ISU Challenger Series
- TBD – Assigned
- WD – Withdrew from competition

Competition placements at senior level
Season	2025–26	2026–27
Four Continents Championships	8th	
Canadian Championships	4th	
GP Skate America		5th
GP Skate Canada International		5th
CS Nebelhorn Trophy		4th

Competition placements at junior level
Season	2022-23	2023-24	2024-25	2025-26
World Junior Championships	6th	6th	10th	1st
Junior Grand Prix Final		2nd		3rd
Canadian Championships	2nd	1st	1st	
JGP Hungary		4th		
JGP Latvia	2nd			1st
JGP Poland	5th	1st		
JGP Turkey				1st
Skate Canada Challenge			1st	

== Detailed results ==
=== Pair Skating with Ava Kemp ===
ISU personal best scores in the +5/-5 GOE System
Segment	Type	Score	Event
Total	TSS	181.62	2026 Skate America
Short program	TSS	67.73	2026 Skate America
Short program	TES	38.37	2026 Skate America
Short program	PCS	29.36	2026 Skate America
Free skating	TSS	115.49	2025 JGP Turkey
Free skating	TES	57.32	2025 JGP Turkey
Free skating	PCS	58.74	2026 Skate America

==== Senior level ====
Results in the 2025–26 season
Date	Event	SP		FS		Total	
Date	Event	P	Score	P	Score	P	Score
Nov 5–9, 2025	(Austria) 2025 Ice Challenge	3	60.14	3	108.10	3	168.24
Jan 5–11, 2026	(Canada) 2026 Canadian Championships	3	65.85	4	120.34	4	186.19
Jan 21-25, 2025	(China) 2026 Four Continents Championships	10	49.09	8	110.11	8	159.20

Results in the 2026–27 season
Date	Event	SP		FS		Total	
Date	Event	P	Score	P	Score	P	Score
Sep 24–26, 2026	(Germany) 2026 CS Nebelhorn Trophy	4	64.21	6	101.27	4	165.48
Oct 30 - Nov 1, 2026	2026 Skate Canada International	3	64.94	6	98.13	5	163.07
Nov 13-15, 2026	(United States) 2026 Skate America	4	67.73	4	113.89	5	181.62

==== Junior level ====
Results in the 2022-23 season
Date	Event	SP		FS		Total	
Date	Event	P	Score	P	Score	P	Score
Sep 7-10, 2022	2022 JGP Latvia	2	43.53	2	81.20	2	124.73
Oct 5-8, 2022	2022 JGP Poland II	5	43.85	5	85.52	5	129.37
Jan 9–15, 2023	(Canada) 2023 Canadian Championships	2	49.87	3	77.65	2	127.52
Feb 27 – Mar 5, 2023	(Canada) 2023 World Junior Championships	5	55.88	5	93.15	6	149.03

Results in the 2023-24 season
Date	Event	SP		FS		Total	
Date	Event	P	Score	P	Score	P	Score
Sep 20-23, 2023	2023 JGP Hungary	6	44.24	4	88.69	4	132.93
Sep 27-30, 2023	2023 JGP Poland	53	54.25	1	105.66	1	159.91
Dec 7–10, 2023	(China) 2023-24 Junior Grand Prix Final	2	57.91	2	110.92	2	168.83
Jan 8–14, 2024	(Canada) 2024 Canadian Championships	1	60.45	1	105.05	1	165.50
Feb 26–Mar 3, 2024	(Taiwan) 2024 World Junior Championships	5	54.86	5	85.81	6	140.67

Results in the 2024-25 season
Date	Event	SP		FS		Total	
Date	Event	P	Score	P	Score	P	Score
Nov 28 - Dec 1, 2024	2024-25 Skate Canada Challenge	1	50.24	1	91.02	1	141.26
Jan 14–19, 2025	(Canada) 2025 Canadian Championships	1	59.49	1	99.90	1	159.39
Jan 20-26, 2025	(Germany) 2025 Bavarian Open	1	60.01	2	107.14	1	167.15
Feb 25–Mar 2, 2025	(Hungary) 2025 World Junior Championships	10	50.20	7	95.17	10	145.37

Results in the 2025–26 season
Date	Event	SP		FS		Total	
Date	Event	P	Score	P	Score	P	Score
Aug 20-23, 2025	(Poland) 2025 JGP Latvia	1	62.67	1	113.24	1	175.91
Aug 27–30, 2025	2025 JGP Turkey	2	63.94	1	115.49	1	179.43
Dec 4–7, 2025	(Japan) 2025–26 Junior Grand Prix Final	3	62.82	4	103.64	3	166.46
Mar 3–8, 2026	(Estonia) 2026 World Junior Championships	2	62.22	1	105.68	1	167.90
