= Rachel Beck =

Canadian singer-songwriter

- Origin: Prince Edward Island, Canada
- Genres: Pop
- Years active: 2018–present
- Website: www.rachelbeckmusic.com

Rachel Beck (born November 19, 1983) is a singer-songwriter from Stratford, Prince Edward Island, Canada. She released her self-titled debut record March 2, 2018. Her lead single 'Reckless Heart' reached #1 on the CBC Music Top 20 Chart and earned Beck a SOCAN #1 Award. In addition, her record garnered eight nominations at the 2019 Music PEI Awards and two nominations at the 2019 East Coast Music Awards. Beck was awarded the Music PEI Rising Star Recording of the Year and Pop Recording of the Year.
