= 2025 World Junior Figure Skating Championships =

Figure skating competition

- Type: ISU Championship
- Date: February 25 – March 2
- Season: 2024–25
- Location: Debrecen, Hungary
- Host: Hungarian National Skating Federation
- Venue: Főnix Aréna

Champions
- Men's singles: (Japan) Rio Nakata
- Women's singles: (Japan) Mao Shimada
- Pairs: (Georgia (country)) Anastasiia Metelkina and Luka Berulava
- Ice dance: (Italy) Noemi Maria Tali and Noah Lafornara
- Previous: 2024 World Junior Championships
- Next: 2026 World Junior Championships

The 2025 World Junior Figure Skating Championships were held from February 25 to March 2, 2025, at the Főnix Aréna in Debrecen, Hungary. The competition determined the entry quotas for each skating federation at the 2026 World Junior Championships. Medals were awarded in men's singles, women's singles, pair skating, and ice dance.

== Qualification ==
=== Age and minimum TES requirements ===
Skaters were eligible for the 2025 World Junior Championships if they turned 13 years of age before July 1, 2024, and if they have not yet turned 19 (singles) or 21 (ice dancers and female pairs skaters) or 23 (male pairs skaters).

Additionally, skaters had to meet the minimum technical elements score requirements. The ISU accepted scores if they were obtained at junior-level ISU-recognized international competitions during the ongoing or preceding season, no later than 21 days before the first official practice day.

Minimum technical scores
Discipline	CTES
Men	80
Women	72
Pairs	63
Ice dance	71

=== Number of entries per discipline ===
Based on the results of the 2024 World Junior Championships, each ISU member nation could field between one and three entries per discipline.

Number of entries per discipline
Spots	Men	Women	Pairs	Ice dance
3	Japan; South Korea	Japan	Canada; Georgia; United States	Israel; United States
2	Canada; Estonia; France; Great Britain; Slovakia; United States	Canada; Estonia; Finland; France; Italy; South Korea; Switzerland; United States	Czech Republic; France; Italy; Ukraine	Canada; France; Germany; Italy

- If not listed above, one entry was allowed.

== Entries ==
Member nations started announcing their entries in December 2024. The International Skating Union released the official list of entrants on January 29, 2025.

Entries
Country	Men	Women	Pairs	Ice dance
Armenia	Mikayel Salazaryan	Sofya Titova	—N/a	
Australia	—N/a	Hana Bath	—N/a	
Austria	Tobia Oellerer	Flora Marie Schaller	—N/a	Anita Straub; Andreas Straub
Azerbaijan	—N/a	Arina Kalugina	—N/a	
Belgium	Denis Krouglov	—N/a		Sofiia Beznosikova; Max Leleu
Bulgaria	Deyan Mihaylov	Lia Lyubenova	—N/a	
Canada	David Bondar	Lulu Lin	Martina Ariano Kent; Charly Laliberté-Laurent	Sandrine Gauthier; Quentin Thieren
Canada	Anthony Paradis	Kara Yun	Jazmine Desroches; Kieran Thrasher	Chloe Nguyen; Brendan Giang
Canada	—N/a		Ava Kemp; Yonathan Elizarov	—N/a
China	Tian Tonghe	Wang Yihan	Zhang Jiaxuan; Huang Yihang	Yin Shanjie; Yang Shirui
Chinese Taipei	—N/a	Yu-Feng Tsai	—N/a	
Croatia	—N/a	Lena Cusak	—N/a	
Cyprus	—N/a	Stefania Yakovleva	—N/a	
Czech Republic	Jakub Tykal	Jana Horčičková	Debora Anna Cohen; Lukáš Vochozka	Eliška Žáková; Filip Mencl
Estonia	Vladislav Churakov	Elina Goidina	—N/a	Ksenia Šipunova; Miron Korjagin
Estonia	Arlet Levandi	Elizabeth Nõu	—N/a	
Finland	Matias Lindfors	Iida Karhunen	—N/a	
Finland	—N/a	Venla Sinisalo	—N/a	
France	Ilia Gogitidze	Eve Dubecq	Louise Ehrhard; Matthis Pellegris	Célina Fradji; Jean-Hans Fourneaux
France	Gianni Motilla	Stefania Gladki	Romane Télémaque; Lucas Coulon	Ambre Perrier Gianesini; Samuel Blanc-Klaperman
Georgia	Konstantin Supatashvili	Inga Gurgenidze	Anastasiia Metelkina; Luka Berulava	—N/a
Germany	Genrikh Gartung	Anna Gerke	—N/a	Darya Grimm; Michail Savitskiy
Germany	—N/a			Lilia Schubert; Nikita Remeshevskiy
Great Britain	Tao MacRae	Alice Smith	Zarah Wood; Alex Lapsky	Mimi Marler Davies; Joseph Black
Great Britain	Lloyd Thomson	—N/a		
Hong Kong	Jiarui Li	Ariel Guo	—N/a	
Hungary	Aleksai Vlasenko	Polina Dzsumanyijazova	Lily Wilberforce; Mózes József Berei	—N/a
Israel	Tamir Kuperman	Sophia Shifrin	—N/a	
Italy	Raffaele Francesco Zich	Amanda Ghezzo	Irina Napolitano; Edoardo Comi	Laura Finelli; Massimiliano Bucciarelli
Italy	—N/a	Anna Pezzetta	Polina Polman; Gabriel Renoldi	Noemi Maria Tali; Noah Lafornara
Japan	Shunsuke Nakamura	Ami Nakai	Sae Shimizu; Lucas Tsuyoshi Honda	Sara Kishimoto; Atsuhiko Tamura
Japan	Rio Nakata	Mao Shimada	—N/a	
Japan	Sena Takahashi	Kaoruko Wada	—N/a	
Kazakhstan	Nikita Krivosheyev	Veronika Kim	—N/a	
Kyrgyzstan	—N/a	Zhasmin Shlaga	—N/a	
Latvia	Kirills Korkacs	Kira Baranovska	—N/a	
Lithuania	—N/a	Gabrielė Juškaitė	—N/a	
Netherlands	—N/a	Angel Delevaque	—N/a	
New Zealand	Yanhao Li	Petra Lahti	—N/a	
Poland	Oscar Oliver	Weronika Ferlin	—N/a	Zofia Grzegorzewska; Oleg Muratov
Slovakia	Adam Hagara	Olívia Lengyelová	Laura Hečková; Alex Války	Aneta Václavíková; Ivan Morozov
Slovakia	Lukáš Václavík	—N/a		
Slovenia	David Sedej	Julija Lovrenčič	—N/a	
South Korea	Choi Ha-bin	Kim Yu-jae	—N/a	
South Korea	Lee Jae-keun	Shin Ji-a	—N/a	
South Korea	Seo Min-kyu	—N/a	—N/a	
Spain	André Zapata	Ariadna Gupta	Megan Yudin; Patrizio Rossi	Sarah Marcilly Vázquez; Jolan Engel
Sweden	Casper Johansson	Alexandra Ödman	—N/a	Charlotte Chung; Axel Mackenzie
Switzerland	Ean Weiler	Anastasia Brandenburg	Oxana Vouillamoz; Tom Bouvart	Gina Zehnder; Beda Leon Sieber
Switzerland	—N/a	Leandra Tzimpoukakis	—N/a	
Thailand	—N/a	Phattaratida Kaneshige	—N/a	
Turkey	Furkan Emre İncel	—N/a		Irmak Yücel; Danil Pak
Ukraine	Yehor Kurtsev	Khrystyna Haliareta	Sofiia Holichenko; Artem Darenskyi	Iryna Pidgaina; Artem Koval
United States	Patrick Blackwell	Elyce Lin-Gracey	Olivia Flores; Luke Wang	Hana Maria Aboian; Daniil Veselukhin
United States	Jacob Sanchez	Sophie Joline von Felten	Reagan Moss; Jakub Galbavy	Caroline Mullen; Brendan Mullen
United States	—N/a		Naomi Williams; Lachlan Lewer	Katarina Wolfkostin; Dimitry Tsarevski

=== Changes to preliminary assignments ===
Date	Discipline	Withdrew	Added	Notes	Ref.
February 5	Men	(Czech Republic) Tadeáš Václavík	(Czech Republic) Jakub Tykal		
February 13	Women	(Poland) Noelle Streuli	(Poland) Weronika Ferlin		
February 18	Men	(Lithuania) Luka Imedashvili			
February 18	Men	(Thailand) Hiro Kaewtathip			
February 18	Women	(Estonia) Maria Elise Kaljuvere	(Estonia) Elizabeth Nõu		
February 18	Women	(Slovakia) Alicia Lengyelová	(Slovakia) Olívia Lengyelová		
February 23	Pairs	(Germany); Katalin Janne Salatzki; Lukas Röseler			

== Medal summary ==
=== Medalists ===
Medals awarded to the skaters who achieved the highest overall placements in each discipline:

Discipline	Gold	Silver	Bronze
Men	(Japan); Rio Nakata	(South Korea); Seo Min-kyu	(Slovakia); Adam Hagara
Women	(Japan); Mao Shimada	(South Korea); Shin Ji-a	(United States); Elyce Lin-Gracey
Pairs	(Georgia (country)); Anastasiia Metelkina; Luka Berulava	(Ukraine); Sofiia Holichenko; Artem Darenskyi	(Canada); Martina Ariano Kent; Charly Laliberté-Laurent
Ice dance	(Italy); Noemi Maria Tali; Noah Lafornara	(United States); Katarina Wolfkostin; Dimitry Tsarevski	(Germany); Darya Grimm; Michail Savitskiy

Small medals awarded to the skaters who achieved the highest short program or rhythm dance placements in each discipline:

Discipline	Gold	Silver	Bronze
Men	(South Korea); Seo Min-kyu	(Japan); Rio Nakata	(United States); Jacob Sanchez
Women	(Japan); Mao Shimada	(Georgia (country)); Inga Gurgenidze	(Japan); Ami Nakai
Pairs	(Georgia (country)); Anastasiia Metelkina; Luka Berulava	(Ukraine); Sofiia Holichenko; Artem Darenskyi	(China); Zhang Jiaxuan; Huang Yihang
Ice dance	(Italy); Noemi Maria Tali; Noah Lafornara	(United States); Katarina Wolfkostin; Dimitry Tsarevski	(Germany); Darya Grimm; Michail Savitskiy

Small medals awarded to the skaters who achieved the highest free skating or free dance placements in each discipline:

Discipline	Gold	Silver	Bronze
Men	(Japan); Rio Nakata	(South Korea); Seo Min-kyu	(Slovakia); Adam Hagara
Women	(Japan); Mao Shimada	(South Korea); Shin Ji-a	(United States); Elyce Lin-Gracey
Pairs	(Georgia (country)); Anastasiia Metelkina; Luka Berulava	(Ukraine); Sofiia Holichenko; Artem Darenskyi	(Canada); Martina Ariano Kent; Charly Laliberté-Laurent
Ice dance	(Italy); Noemi Maria Tali; Noah Lafornara	(United States); Katarina Wolfkostin; Dimitry Tsarevski	(Germany); Darya Grimm; Michail Savitskiy

=== Medals by country ===
Table of medals for overall placement:

Rank	Nation	Gold	Silver	Bronze	Total
1	Japan	2	0	0	2
2	Georgia	1	0	0	1
2	Italy	1	0	0	1
4	South Korea	0	2	0	2
5	United States	0	1	1	2
6	Ukraine	0	1	0	1
7	Canada	0	0	1	1
7	Germany	0	0	1	1
7	Slovakia	0	0	1	1
Totals (9 entries)		4	4	4	12

== Records and achievements ==
The following new junior ISU best scores were set during this season:

Disc.	Segment	Skater(s)	Score	Date	Ref.
Ice dance	Total score	(Italy); Noemi Maria Tali; Noah Lafornara	177.50	February 27, 2025	

== Results ==
=== Men's singles ===
Men's results
Rank	Skater	Nation	Total	SP		FS	
1st place, gold medalist(s)	Rio Nakata	Japan	248.99	2	86.04	1	162.95
2nd place, silver medalist(s)	Seo Min-kyu	South Korea	241.45	1	86.68	2	154.77
3rd place, bronze medalist(s)	Adam Hagara	Slovakia	233.93	5	80.89	3	153.04
4	Jacob Sanchez	United States	230.41	3	82.88	5	147.53
5	Choi Ha-bin	South Korea	227.28	6	77.22	4	150.06
6	Shunsuke Nakamura	Japan	225.69	4	81.29	8	144.40
7	Genrikh Gartung	Germany	218.94	8	74.37	7	144.57
8	Arlet Levandi	Estonia	218.90	12	72.42	6	146.48
9	Sena Takahashi	Japan	216.45	7	76.85	11	139.60
10	Yanhao Li	New Zealand	215.85	10	72.96	9	142.89
11	Lee Jae-keun	South Korea	212.02	9	74.24	13	137.78
12	Tamir Kuperman	Israel	209.49	17	68.17	10	141.32
13	Patrick Blackwell	United States	200.06	21	62.00	12	138.06
14	Casper Johansson	Sweden	195.61	18	65.85	14	129.76
15	Tian Tonghe	China	193.39	11	72.46	17	120.93
16	Anthony Paradis	Canada	190.58	14	68.37	16	122.21
17	David Bondar	Canada	190.29	22	61.73	15	128.56
18	Jiarui Li	Hong Kong	179.40	19	63.87	18	115.53
19	Lukáš Václavík	Slovakia	176.36	15	68.26	20	108.10
20	Gianni Motilla	France	173.59	23	61.31	19	112.28
21	Raffaele Francesco Zich	Italy	166.99	13	69.53	23	97.46
22	Denis Krouglov	Belgium	166.41	24	61.31	21	105.10
23	Ilia Gogitidze	France	162.36	20	63.61	22	98.75
24	Ean Weiler	Switzerland	157.98	16	68.19	24	89.79
25	Matias Lindfors	Finland	59.27	25	59.27	Did not advance to free skate	
26	Vladislav Churakov	Estonia	58.31	26	58.31	Did not advance to free skate	
27	Nikita Krivosheyev	Kazakhstan	58.02	27	58.02	Did not advance to free skate	
28	André Zapata	Spain	57.70	28	57.70	Did not advance to free skate	
29	Yehor Kurtsev	Ukraine	57.59	29	57.59	Did not advance to free skate	
30	Jakub Tykal	Czech Republic	56.50	30	56.50	Did not advance to free skate	
31	Konstantin Supatashvili	Georgia	56.45	31	56.45	Did not advance to free skate	
32	David Sedej	Slovenia	56.26	32	56.26	Did not advance to free skate	
33	Deyan Mihaylov	Bulgaria	55.98	33	55.98	Did not advance to free skate	
34	Tao MacRae	Great Britain	55.57	34	55.57	Did not advance to free skate	
35	Ze Zeng Fang	Malaysia	50.69	35	50.69	Did not advance to free skate	
36	Lloyd Thomson	Great Britain	51.41	36	51.41	Did not advance to free skate	
37	Furkan Emre İncel	Turkey	49.71	37	49.71	Did not advance to free skate	
38	Kirills Korkacs	Latvia	49.70	38	49.70	Did not advance to free skate	
39	Mikayel Salazaryan	Armenia	49.15	39	49.15	Did not advance to free skate	
40	Aleksai Vlasenko	Hungary	46.38	40	46.38	Did not advance to free skate	
41	Oscar Oliver	Poland	45.88	41	45.88	Did not advance to free skate	

=== Women's singles ===
Women's results
Rank	Skater	Nation	Total	SP		FS	
1st place, gold medalist(s)	Mao Shimada	Japan	230.84	1	74.68	1	156.16
2nd place, silver medalist(s)	Shin Ji-a	South Korea	190.53	7	63.57	2	126.96
3rd place, bronze medalist(s)	Elyce Lin-Gracey	United States	188.71	4	66.11	3	122.60
4	Ami Nakai	Japan	185.89	3	66.84	6	119.05
5	Stefania Gladki	France	184.29	9	62.62	5	121.67
6	Inga Gurgenidze	Georgia	183.04	2	67.47	11	115.57
7	Elina Goidina	Estonia	182.18	6	64.15	8	118.03
8	Kaoruko Wada	Japan	181.65	5	64.35	9	117.30
9	Leandra Tzimpoukakis	Switzerland	179.66	10	61.37	7	118.29
10	Hana Bath	Australia	179.00	17	56.95	4	122.05
11	Iida Karhunen	Finland	176.84	11	60.24	10	116.60
12	Wang Yihan	China	175.51	8	63.44	16	112.07
13	Anna Pezzetta	Italy	174.59	12	60.01	13	114.58
14	Arina Kalugina	Azerbaijan	172.43	16	57.04	12	115.39
15	Anastasia Brandenburg	Switzerland	170.52	15	57.94	15	112.58
16	Kim Yu-jae	South Korea	168.63	21	54.30	14	114.33
17	Sophia Shifrin	Israel	168.21	13	59.51	18	108.70
18	Sophie Joline von Felten	United States	165.40	23	53.93	17	111.47
19	Angel Delevaque	Netherlands	161.88	18	56.30	19	105.58
20	Sofya Titova	Armenia	159.79	20	55.13	20	104.66
21	Polina Dzsumanyijazova	Hungary	159.39	14	59.04	22	100.35
22	Stefania Yakovleva	Cyprus	158.12	19	55.45	21	102.67
23	Kira Baranovska	Latvia	149.03	24	53.44	23	95.59
24	Lulu Lin	Canada	143.38	22	53.97	24	89.41
25	Jana Horčičková	Czech Republic	53.43	25	53.43	Did not advance to free skate	
26	Veronika Kim	Kazakhstan	53.28	26	53.28	Did not advance to free skate	
27	Venla Sinisalo	Finland	53.19	27	53.19	Did not advance to free skate	
28	Kara Yun	Canada	52.91	28	52.91	Did not advance to free skate	
29	Ariel Guo	Hong Kong	52.64	29	52.64	Did not advance to free skate	
30	Gabrielė Juškaitė	Lithuania	52.49	30	52.49	Did not advance to free skate	
31	Anna Gerke	Germany	49.05	31	49.05	Did not advance to free skate	
32	Eve Dubecq	France	48.47	32	48.47	Did not advance to free skate	
33	Amanda Ghezzo	Italy	47.61	33	47.61	Did not advance to free skate	
34	Flora Marie Schaller	Austria	46.44	34	46.44	Did not advance to free skate	
35	Yu-Feng Tsai	Chinese Taipei	46.12	35	46.12	Did not advance to free skate	
36	Julija Lovrenčič	Slovenia	45.87	36	45.87	Did not advance to free skate	
37	Alexandra Ödman	Sweden	44.75	37	44.75	Did not advance to free skate	
38	Lia Lyubenova	Bulgaria	44.51	38	44.51	Did not advance to free skate	
39	Alice Smith	Great Britain	43.45	39	43.45	Did not advance to free skate	
40	Olívia Lengyelová	Slovakia	43.32	40	43.32	Did not advance to free skate	
41	Petra Lahti	New Zealand	43.30	41	43.30	Did not advance to free skate	
42	Lena Cusak	Croatia	42.50	42	42.50	Did not advance to free skate	
43	Khrystyna Haliareta	Ukraine	42.30	43	42.30	Did not advance to free skate	
44	Ariadna Gupta	Spain	41.42	44	41.42	Did not advance to free skate	
45	Weronika Ferlin	Poland	39.61	45	39.61	Did not advance to free skate	
46	Phattaratida Kaneshige	Thailand	38.62	46	38.62	Did not advance to free skate	
47	Elizabeth Nõu	Estonia	37.85	47	37.85	Did not advance to free skate	
48	Zhasmin Shlaga	Kyrgyzstan	35.07	48	35.07	Did not advance to free skate	

=== Pairs ===
Pairs' results
Rank	Skater	Nation	Total	SP		FS	
1st place, gold medalist(s)	Anastasiia Metelkina; Luka Berulava	Georgia	191.01	1	69.18	1	121.83
2nd place, silver medalist(s)	Sofiia Holichenko; Artem Darenskyi	Ukraine	164.06	2	57.40	2	106.66
3rd place, bronze medalist(s)	Martina Ariano Kent; Charly Laliberté-Laurent	Canada	155.02	4	55.81	3	99.21
4	Oxana Vouillamoz; Tom Bouvart	Switzerland	153.25	6	54.82	4	98.43
5	Zhang Jiaxuan; Huang Yihang	China	151.41	3	57.38	9	94.03
6	Olivia Flores; Luke Wang	United States	148.40	8	51.02	5	97.38
7	Romane Télémaque; Lucas Coulon	France	147.35	7	53.17	8	94.18
8	Jazmine Desroches; Kieran Thrasher	Canada	147.35	5	55.05	11	92.30
9	Naomi Williams; Lachlan Lewer	United States	146.86	9	50.95	6	95.91
10	Ava Kemp; Yonathan Elizarov	Canada	145.37	10	50.20	7	95.17
11	Sae Shimizu; Lucas Tsuyoshi Honda	Japan	141.83	11	49.33	10	92.50
12	Irina Napolitano; Edoardo Comi	Italy	137.81	14	46.49	12	91.32
13	Louise Ehrhard; Matthis Pellegris	France	135.31	13	47.34	13	87.97
14	Laura Hečková; Alex Války	Slovakia	124.97	16	45.95	14	80.02
15	Polina Polman; Gabriel Renoldi	Italy	124.01	12	48.28	15	75.73
16	Megan Yudin; Patrizio Rossi	Spain	118.43	15	46.23	16	72.20
17	Reagan Moss; Jakub Galbavy	United States	45.52	17	45.52	Did not advance to free skate	
18	Debora Anna Cohen; Lukáš Vochozka	Czech Republic	45.19	18	45.19	Did not advance to free skate	
19	Zarah Wood; Alex Lapsky	Great Britain	43.23	19	43.23	Did not advance to free skate	
20	Lily Wilberforce; Mózes József Berei	Hungary	40.23	20	40.23	Did not advance to free skate	

=== Ice dance ===
Ice dance results
Rank	Skater	Nation	Total	RD		FD	
1st place, gold medalist(s)	Noemi Maria Tali; Noah Lafornara	Italy	177.50	1	70.92	1	106.58
2nd place, silver medalist(s)	Katarina Wolfkostin; Dimitry Tsarevski	United States	167.51	2	65.71	2	101.80
3rd place, bronze medalist(s)	Darya Grimm; Michail Savitskiy	Germany	164.26	3	65.42	3	98.84
4	Iryna Pidgaina; Artem Koval	Ukraine	158.93	5	62.54	4	96.39
5	Célina Fradji; Jean-Hans Fourneaux	France	157.71	4	62.87	5	94.84
6	Caroline Mullen; Brendan Mullen	United States	153.76	6	61.83	8	91.93
7	Hana Maria Aboian; Daniil Veselukhin	United States	153.21	7	59.64	6	93.57
8	Sandrine Gauthier; Quentin Thieren	Canada	150.74	8	58.37	7	92.37
9	Chloe Nguyen; Brendan Giang	Canada	146.27	9	57.46	10	88.81
10	Ambre Perrier Gianesini; Samuel Blanc-Klaperman	France	145.98	11	56.38	9	89.60
11	Sofiia Beznosikova; Max Leleu	Belgium	144.25	10	56.38	11	87.87
12	Gina Zehnder; Beda Leon Sieber	Switzerland	138.99	12	55.72	13	83.27
13	Lilia Schubert; Nikita Remeshevskiy	Germany	136.88	13	53.38	12	83.50
14	Aneta Václavíková; Ivan Morozov	Slovakia	134.92	14	52.62	15	82.30
15	Laura Finelli; Massimiliano Bucciarelli	Italy	134.88	16	51.75	14	83.13
16	Sara Kishimoto; Atsuhiko Tamura	Japan	132.95	15	52.04	16	80.91
17	Anita Straub; Andreas Straub	Austria	127.02	18	47.57	17	79.45
18	Irmak Yücel; Danil Pak	Turkey	126.82	17	48.15	18	78.67
19	Eliška Žáková; Filip Mencl	Czech Republic	116.84	19	46.96	19	69.88
20	Mimi Marler Davies; Joseph Black	Great Britain	104.31	20	43.14	20	61.17
21	Sarah Marcilly Vázquez; Jolan Engel	Spain	42.99	21	42.99	Did not advance to free dance	
22	Zofia Grzegorzewska; Oleg Muratov	Poland	42.74	22	42.74	Did not advance to free dance	
23	Ksenia Šipunova; Miron Korjagin	Estonia	40.34	23	40.34	Did not advance to free dance	
24	Yin Shanjie; Yang Shirui	China	40.15	24	40.15	Did not advance to free dance	
25	Charlotte Chung; Axel Mackenzie	Sweden	38.23	25	38.23	Did not advance to free dance	
