= 2024 World Junior Figure Skating Championships =

Figure skating competition

- Type: ISU Championship
- Date: February 26 – March 3
- Season: 2023–24
- Location: Taipei, Taiwan
- Host: Chinese Taipei Skating Union
- Venue: Taipei Arena

Champions
- Men's singles: (South Korea) Seo Min-kyu
- Women's singles: (Japan) Mao Shimada
- Pairs: (Georgia (country)) Anastasiia Metelkina and Luka Berulava
- Ice dance: (United States) Leah Neset and Artem Markelov
- Previous: 2023 World Junior Championships
- Next: 2025 World Junior Championships

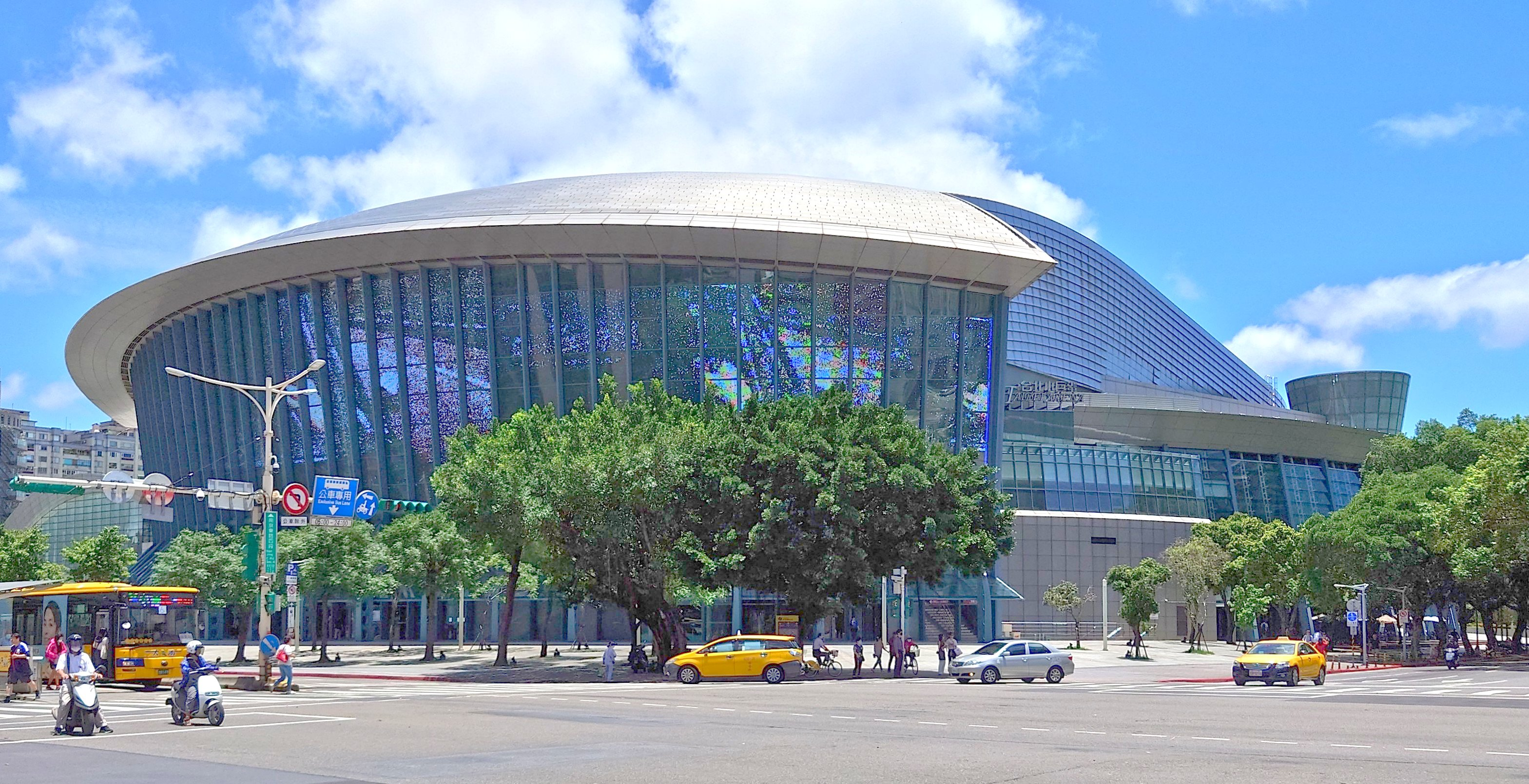
Taipei Arena

The 2024 World Junior Figure Skating Championships were held from February 26 to March 3, 2024, at the Taipei Arena in Taipei, Taiwan. The competition determined the entry quotas for each skating federation at the 2025 World Junior Championships. Medals were awarded in men's singles, women's singles, pair skating, and ice dance.

== Qualification ==
=== Age and minimum TES requirements ===
Skaters were eligible for the 2024 World Junior Championships if they turned 13 years of age before July 1, 2023, and if they have not yet turned 19 (singles and females of the other two disciplines) or 21 (male pair skaters and ice dancers).

Additionally, skaters had to meet the minimum technical elements score requirements. The ISU accepted scores if they were obtained at junior-level ISU-recognized international competitions during the ongoing or preceding season, no later than 21 days before the first official practice day.

Minimum technical scores
Discipline	SP/RD	FS/FD
Men	25	44
Women	25	40
Pairs	23	34
Ice dance	24	38

- SP/RD and FS/FD scores could be attained at different events.

=== Number of entries per discipline ===
Based on the results of the 2023 World Junior Championships, each ISU member nation could field between one and three entries per discipline.

Number of entries per discipline
Spots	Men	Women	Pairs	Ice dance
3	Japan	Japan; South Korea	Australia; United States	Canada; Czech Republic; United States
2	Canada; China; Estonia; Italy; South Korea; Sweden; Switzerland; United States	Canada; China; Estonia; Georgia; Switzerland; United States	Canada; China; Czech Republic; France; Germany; Japan; Ukraine	Cyprus; France; Great Britain; South Korea

- If not listed above, one entry was allowed.

== Entries ==
Member nations started announcing their entries in December 2023. The International Skating Union published the complete list of entries on February 8, 2024.

Entries
Country	Men	Women	Pairs	Ice dance
Armenia	Mikayel Salazaryan	—N/a		Kristina Dobroserdova; Alessandro Pellegrini
Australia	—N/a	Hana Bath	—N/a	
Austria	—N/a	Hannah Frank	—N/a	Anita Straub; Andreas Straub
Azerbaijan	—N/a	Sabina Alieva	—N/a	
Belgium	Denis Krouglov	—N/a		Sofiia Beznosikova; Max Leleu
Brazil	—N/a			Catharina Tibau; Cayden Dawson
Bulgaria	Deyan Mihaylov	Chiara Hristova	—N/a	
Canada	Anthony Paradis	Lulu Lin	Ava Kemp; Yohnatan Elizarov	Alisa Korneva; Kieran MacDonald
Canada	Aleksa Rakic	Kaiya Ruiter	Martina Ariano Kent; Charly Laliberté-Laurent	Chloe Nguyen; Brendan Giang
Canada	—N/a			Layla Veillon; Alexander Brandys
Chinese Taipei	Li Yu-hsiang	Tsai Yu-feng	—N/a	
Croatia	—N/a	Lena Cusak	—N/a	
Cyprus	—N/a			Angelina Kudryavtseva; Ilia Karankevich
Czech Republic	—N/a	Jana Horčičková	Debora Anna Cohen; Lukáš Vochozka	Eliška Žáková; Filip Mencl
Czech Republic	—N/a	—N/a		Natálie Blaasová; Filip Blaas
Czech Republic	—N/a	—N/a		Lauren Audrey Baťková; Jacob Yang
Estonia	Arlet Levandi	Elina Goidina	—N/a	Ksenia Sipunova; Miron Korjagin
Estonia	Jegor Marstenko	Maria Eliise Kaljuvere	—N/a	—N/a
Finland	Matias Lindfors	Iida Karhunen	—N/a	Hilda Taylor; Nolen Hickey
France	François Pitot	Stefania Gladki	Louise Ehrhard; Matthis Pellegris	Célina Fradji; Jean-Hans Fourneaux
France	—N/a		Romane Télémaque; Lucas Coulon	Dania Mouaden; Théo Bigot
Georgia	Konstantin Supatashvili	Inga Gurgenidze	Anastasiia Metelkina; Luka Berulava	Mariia Alieva; Yehor Barshak
Germany	Hugo Willi Herrmann	Olesya Ray	Aliyah Ackermann; Tobija Harms	Darya Grimm; Michail Savitskiy
Germany	—N/a		Sonja Löwenherz; Robert Löwenherz	—N/a
Great Britain	Edward Appleby	Alexa Severn	Lucy Hay; Kyle McLeod	Molly Hairsine; Alessio Surenkov-Gultchev
Great Britain	—N/a			Ashlie Slatter; Atl Ongay-Perez
Hong Kong	Cheung Chiu Hei	Megan Wong	—N/a	
Hungary	Aleksandr Vlasenko	Polina Dzsumanyijazova	Nora Rothenbühler; Mózes József Berei	—N/a
Israel	Tamir Kuperman	Sophia Shifrin	Sofia Enkina; Nikita Kovalenko	Elizabeth Tkachenko; Alexei Kiliakov
Italy	Matteo Nalbone	Sarina Joos	Irina Napolitano; Edoardo Comi	Noemi Maria Tali; Noah Lafornara
Italy	Raffaele Francesco Zich	—N/a		
Japan	Haru Kakiuchi	Ikura Kushida	Sae Shimizu; Lucas Tsuyoshi Honda	Sara Kishimoto; Atsuhiko Tamura
Japan	Shunsuke Nakamura	Mao Shimada	—N/a	
Japan	Rio Nakata	Rena Uezono	—N/a	
Kazakhstan	Oleg Melnikov	Yekaterina Balyuba	—N/a	
Kyrgyzstan	—N/a	Zhasmin Shlaga	—N/a	
Latvia	Fedir Kulish	Kira Baranovska	—N/a	
Lithuania	Luka Imedashvili	Meda Variakojyte	—N/a	
Malaysia	Ze Zeng Fang	—N/a		
Mexico	—N/a	Natalia Acosta Moisés	—N/a	
Netherlands	—N/a	Angel Delavaque	—N/a	
New Zealand	Yanhao Li	—N/a		
Norway	Daniil Valanov	Mia Risa Gomez	—N/a	
Philippines	—N/a	Sofia Frank	—N/a	
Poland	Jakub Lofek	Noelle Streuli	—N/a	Sofiia Dovhal; Wiktor Kulesza
South Africa	—N/a	Gian-Quen Isaacs	—N/a	
South Korea	Lee Jae-keun	Kim Yu-jae	—N/a	Kim Jin-ny; Lee Na-mu
South Korea	Seo Min-kyu	Kim Yu-seong	—N/a	—N/a
South Korea	—N/a	Shin Ji-a	—N/a	—N/a
Slovakia	Adam Hagara	Olivia Lengyelová	Nikola Sitková; Oliver Kubačák	—N/a
Slovenia	David Sedej	Zoja Kramar	—N/a	
Spain	Adrián Jiménez De Baldomero	—N/a	Claudia Sinclair Scotti; Noah Quesada	Sarah Marcilly Vázquez; Jolan Engel
Sweden	Casper Johansson	Nina Fredricksson	—N/a	
Sweden	Elias Sayed	—N/a	—N/a	
Switzerland	Aurélian Chervet	Anastasia Brandenburg	—N/a	Gina Zehnder; Beda Leon Sieber
Switzerland	Georgii Pavlov	Anthea Gradinaru	—N/a	—N/a
Thailand	—N/a	Phattaratida Kaneshige	—N/a	
Turkey	Ali Efe Güneş	Derya Taygan	—N/a	Irmak Yücel; Danil Pak
Ukraine	Kyrylo Marsak	Taisiia Spesivtseva	Violetta Sierova; Ivan Khobta	Iryna Pidgayna; Artem Koval
United States	Daniel Martynov	Josephine Lee	Olivia Flores; Luke Wang	Leah Neset; Artem Markelov
United States	Jacob Sanchez	Sherry Zhang	Naomi Williams; Lachlan Lewer	Elliana Peal; Ethan Peal
United States	—N/a		Adele Zheng; Andy Deng	Yahli Pedersen; Jeffrey Chen

=== Changes to preliminary assignments ===
Date	Discipline	Withdrew	Ref.
February 16	Women	(Malaysia) Katherine Ong Pui Kuan	

== Medal summary ==
=== Medalists ===
Medals awarded to the skaters who achieved the highest overall placements in each discipline:

Discipline	Gold	Silver	Bronze
Men	(South Korea); Seo Min-kyu	(Japan); Rio Nakata	(Slovakia); Adam Hagara
Women	(Japan); Mao Shimada	(South Korea); Shin Ji-a	(Japan); Rena Uezono
Pairs	(Georgia (country)); Anastasiia Metelkina; Luka Berulava	(United States); Olivia Flores; Luke Wang	(United States); Naomi Williams; Lachlan Lewer
Ice dance	(United States); Leah Neset; Artem Markelov	(Israel); Elizabeth Tkachenko; Alexei Kiliakov	(Germany); Darya Grimm; Michail Savitskiy

Small medals awarded to the skaters who achieved the highest short program or rhythm dance placements in each discipline:

Discipline	Gold	Silver	Bronze
Men	(South Korea); Seo Min-kyu	(France); François Pitot	(Slovakia); Adam Hagara
Women	(South Korea); Shin Ji-a	(Japan); Mao Shimada	(Japan); Ikura Kushida
Pairs	(Georgia (country)); Anastasiia Metelkina; Luka Berulava	(United States); Olivia Flores; Luke Wang	(Canada); Martina Ariano Kent; Charly Laliberté-Laurent
Ice dance	(United States); Leah Neset; Artem Markelov	(Germany); Darya Grimm; Michail Savitskiy	(Israel); Elizabeth Tkachenko; Alexei Kiliakov

Small medals awarded to the skaters who achieved the highest free skating or free dance placements in each discipline:

Discipline	Gold	Silver	Bronze
Men	(Japan); Rio Nakata	(South Korea); Seo Min-kyu	(Slovakia); Adam Hagara
Women	(Japan); Mao Shimada	(South Korea); Shin Ji-a	(Japan); Rena Uezono
Pairs	(Georgia (country)); Anastasiia Metelkina; Luka Berulava	(United States); Olivia Flores; Luke Wang	(Italy); Irina Napolitano; Edoardo Comi
Ice dance	(United States); Leah Neset; Artem Markelov	(Israel); Elizabeth Tkachenko; Alexei Kiliakov	(Germany); Darya Grimm; Michail Savitskiy

=== Medals by country ===
Table of medals for overall placement:

Rank	Nation	Gold	Silver	Bronze	Total
1	Japan	1	1	1	3
1	United States	1	1	1	3
3	South Korea	1	1	0	2
4	Georgia	1	0	0	1
5	Israel	0	1	0	1
6	Germany	0	0	1	1
6	Slovakia	0	0	1	1
Totals (7 entries)		4	4	4	12

== Results ==
=== Men's singles ===
Men's results
Rank	Skater	Nation	Total	SP		FS	
1st place, gold medalist(s)	Seo Min-kyu	South Korea	230.75	1	80.58	2	150.17
2nd place, silver medalist(s)	Rio Nakata	Japan	229.31	5	77.60	1	151.71
3rd place, bronze medalist(s)	Adam Hagara	Slovakia	225.61	3	78.02	3	147.59
4	Shunsuke Nakamura	Japan	215.46	10	72.85	4	142.61
5	François Pitot	France	214.95	2	78.79	7	136.16
6	Lee Jae-keun	South Korea	212.22	12	70.15	5	142.07
7	Arlet Levandi	Estonia	211.98	8	75.43	6	136.55
8	Aleksa Rakic	Canada	211.74	4	77.74	9	134.00
9	Edward Appleby	Great Britain	205.55	6	75.69	11	129.86
10	Jacob Sanchez	United States	199.17	9	73.35	15	125.82
11	Jakub Lofek	Poland	199.04	7	75.55	18	123.49
12	Yanhao Li	New Zealand	197.47	23	63.09	8	134.63
13	Daniel Martynov	United States	195.83	11	71.69	16	124.14
14	Casper Johansson	Sweden	193.66	15	65.71	12	127.95
15	Anthony Paradis	Canada	193.61	21	63.19	10	130.42
16	Li Yu-hsiang	Chinese Taipei	193.26	13	66.53	14	126.73
17	Haru Kakiuchi	Japan	192.82	16	65.49	13	127.33
18	Matteo Nalbone	Italy	188.89	17	65.22	17	123.67
19	Tamir Kuperman	Israel	182.83	20	63.60	20	119.23
20	Konstantin Supatashvili	Georgia	182.68	19	63.99	21	118.69
21	Aleksandr Vlasenko	Hungary	181.85	24	62.12	19	119.73
22	Matias Lindfors	Finland	180.80	14	66.06	23	114.74
23	Kyrylo Marsak	Ukraine	180.42	18	64.29	22	116.13
24	Denis Krouglov	Belgium	169.21	22	63.09	24	106.12
25	Fedir Kulish	Latvia	61.84	25	61.84	Did not advance to free skate	
26	Luka Imedashvili	Lithuania	60.52	26	60.52	Did not advance to free skate	
27	Ali Efe Güneş	Turkey	60.37	27	60.37	Did not advance to free skate	
28	Aurélian Chervet	Switzerland	59.54	28	59.54	Did not advance to free skate	
29	Raffaele Francesco Zich	Italy	59.48	29	59.48	Did not advance to free skate	
30	Hugo Willi Herrmann	Germany	58.56	30	58.56	Did not advance to free skate	
31	Georgii Pavlov	Switzerland	57.36	31	57.36	Did not advance to free skate	
32	Elias Sayed	Sweden	57.27	32	57.27	Did not advance to free skate	
33	Oleg Melnikov	Kazakhstan	53.78	33	53.78	Did not advance to free skate	
34	Jegor Martsenko	Estonia	51.90	34	51.90	Did not advance to free skate	
35	Ze Zeng Fang	Malaysia	50.69	35	50.69	Did not advance to free skate	
36	Daniil Valanov	Norway	49.33	36	49.33	Did not advance to free skate	
37	David Sedej	Slovenia	48.96	37	48.96	Did not advance to free skate	
38	Deyan Mihaylov	Bulgaria	48.03	38	48.03	Did not advance to free skate	
39	Mikayel Salazaryan	Armenia	47.50	39	47.50	Did not advance to free skate	
40	Adrián Jiménez de Baldomero	Spain	44.63	40	44.63	Did not advance to free skate	
41	Cheung Chiu Hei	Hong Kong	44.24	41	44.24	Did not advance to free skate	

=== Women's singles ===
Women's results
Rank	Skater	Nation	Total	SP		FS	
1st place, gold medalist(s)	Mao Shimada	Japan	218.36	2	72.60	1	145.76
2nd place, silver medalist(s)	Shin Ji-a	South Korea	212.43	1	73.48	2	138.95
3rd place, bronze medalist(s)	Rena Uezono	Japan	194.70	8	61.96	3	132.74
4	Iida Karhunen	Finland	186.32	4	64.64	4	121.68
5	Ikura Kushida	Japan	180.97	3	66.61	11	114.36
6	Anastasia Brandenburg	Switzerland	177.36	6	62.57	10	114.79
7	Sarina Joos	Italy	174.73	14	57.66	5	117.07
8	Sherry Zhang	United States	174.04	11	58.57	7	115.47
9	Stefania Gladki	France	173.84	10	58.65	9	115.19
10	Lulu Lin	Canada	173.71	15	57.12	6	116.59
11	Elina Goidina	Estonia	172.89	5	63.03	17	109.86
12	Inga Gurgenidze	Georgia	172.87	7	62.28	16	110.59
13	Maria Eliise Kaljuvere	Estonia	170.96	17	55.62	8	115.34
14	Anthea Gradinaru	Switzerland	170.84	13	57.85	12	112.99
15	Kim Yu-seong	South Korea	170.80	9	59.58	15	111.22
16	Kim Yu-jae	South Korea	167.84	18	54.98	13	112.86
17	Phattaratida Kaneshige	Thailand	166.32	21	54.01	14	112.31
18	Jana Horčičková	Czech Republic	164.22	12	58.33	22	105.89
19	Polina Dzsumanyijazova	Hungary	162.39	24	53.35	18	109.04
20	Josephine Lee	United States	161.74	20	54.33	19	107.41
21	Kaiya Ruiter	Canada	161.19	19	54.62	20	106.57
22	Sophia Shifrin	Israel	159.77	22	53.84	21	105.93
23	Tsai Yu-feng	Chinese Taipei	158.90	16	56.30	23	102.60
24	Noelle Streuli	Poland	155.39	23	53.38	24	102.01
25	Olesya Ray	Germany	53.11	25	53.11	Did not advance to free skate	
26	Hana Bath	Australia	52.48	26	52.48	Did not advance to free skate	
27	Nina Fredriksson	Sweden	51.61	27	51.61	Did not advance to free skate	
28	Zoja Kramar	Slovenia	50.83	28	50.83	Did not advance to free skate	
29	Olívia Lengyelová	Slovakia	50.74	29	50.74	Did not advance to free skate	
30	Zhasmin Shlaga	Kyrgyzstan	49.74	30	49.74	Did not advance to free skate	
31	Hannah Frank	Austria	49.59	31	49.59	Did not advance to free skate	
32	Kira Baranovska	Latvia	48.55	32	48.55	Did not advance to free skate	
33	Angel Delevaque	Netherlands	48.33	33	48.33	Did not advance to free skate	
34	Yekaterina Balyuba	Kazakhstan	47.25	34	47.25	Did not advance to free skate	
35	Chiara Hristova	Bulgaria	46.17	35	46.17	Did not advance to free skate	
36	Lena Cusak	Croatia	45.71	36	45.71	Did not advance to free skate	
37	Taisiia Spesivtseva	Ukraine	45.30	37	45.30	Did not advance to free skate	
38	Gian-Quen Isaacs	South Africa	44.30	38	44.30	Did not advance to free skate	
39	Meda Variakojyte	Lithuania	43.57	39	43.57	Did not advance to free skate	
40	Megan Wong	Hong Kong	39.88	40	39.88	Did not advance to free skate	
41	Sabina Alieva	Azerbaijan	39.71	41	39.71	Did not advance to free skate	
42	Derya Taygan	Turkey	39.47	42	39.47	Did not advance to free skate	
43	Mia Risa Gomez	Norway	37.97	43	37.97	Did not advance to free skate	
44	Natalia Acosta Moisés	Mexico	34.90	44	34.90	Did not advance to free skate	
45	Sofia Lexi Jacqueline Frank	Philippines	32.83	45	32.83	Did not advance to free skate	
46	Alexa Severn	Great Britain	31.68	46	31.68	Did not advance to free skate	

=== Pairs ===
Pairs' results
Rank	Team	Nation	Total	SP		FS	
1st place, gold medalist(s)	Anastasiia Metelkina; Luka Berulava	Georgia	179.32	1	71.53	1	107.79
2nd place, silver medalist(s)	Olivia Flores; Luke Wang	United States	166.89	2	62.33	2	104.56
3rd place, bronze medalist(s)	Naomi Williams; Lachlan Lewer	United States	146.00	4	55.37	4	90.63
4	Irina Napolitano; Edoardo Comi	Italy	143.88	7	49.76	3	94.12
5	Martina Ariano Kent; Charly Laliberté-Laurent	Canada	141.26	3	55.67	6	85.59
6	Ava Kemp; Yohnatan Elizarov	Canada	140.67	5	54.86	5	85.81
7	Violetta Sierova; Ivan Khobta	Ukraine	134.01	8	48.93	7	85.08
8	Debora Anna Cohen; Lukáš Vochozka	Czech Republic	128.53	9	46.78	8	81.75
9	Romane Télémaque; Lucas Coulon	France	127.46	10	46.58	9	80.88
10	Adele Zheng; Andy Deng	United States	124.88	11	46.02	11	78.86
11	Sofia Enkina; Nikita Kovalenko	Israel	124.81	12	45.83	10	78.98
12	Nora Marleen Rothenbühler; Mózes József Berei	Hungary	120.79	15	42.28	12	78.51
13	Nikola Sítková; Oliver Kubačák	Slovakia	120.39	13	44.94	13	75.45
14	Sae Shimizu; Lucas Tsuyoshi Honda	Japan	115.77	14	43.69	14	72.08
15	Aliyah Ackermann; Tobija Harms	Germany	113.08	16	41.97	15	71.11
WD	Louise Ehrhard; Matthis Pellegris	France	WD	6	50.75	Withdrew from competition	
17	Lucy Hay; Kyle McLeod	Great Britain	41.49	17	41.49	Did not advance to free skate	
18	Claudia Sinclair Scotti; Noah Quesada	Spain	41.06	18	41.06	Did not advance to free skate	
19	Sonja Löwenherz; Robert Löwenherz	Germany	36.73	19	36.73	Did not advance to free skate	

=== Ice dance ===
Ice dance results
Rank	Team	Nation	Total	RD		FD	
1st place, gold medalist(s)	Leah Neset; Artem Markelov	United States	169.76	1	70.16	1	99.60
2nd place, silver medalist(s)	Elizabeth Tkachenko; Alexei Kiliakov	Israel	162.68	3	65.88	2	96.80
3rd place, bronze medalist(s)	Darya Grimm; Michail Savitskiy	Germany	162.13	2	66.11	3	96.02
4	Célina Fradji; Jean-Hans Fourneaux	France	156.66	6	61.52	4	95.14
5	Elliana Peal; Ethan Peal	United States	154.09	5	61.65	5	92.44
6	Chloe Nguyen; Brendan Giang	Canada	151.09	7	61.22	6	89.87
7	Noemi Maria Tali; Noah Lafornara	Italy	148.57	4	62.58	9	85.99
8	Layla Veillon; Alexander Brandys	Canada	147.40	11	58.08	7	89.32
9	Yahli Pedersen; Jeffrey Chen	United States	144.55	13	56.81	8	87.74
10	Dania Mouaden; Théo Bigot	France	144.52	10	58.66	10	85.86
11	Angelina Kudryavtseva; Ilia Karankevich	Cyprus	141.08	8	59.68	14	81.40
12	Sara Kishimoto; Atsuhiko Tamura	Japan	140.87	14	56.75	11	84.12
13	Ashlie Slatter; Atl Ongay-Perez	Great Britain	140.41	12	56.84	13	83.57
14	Gina Zehnder; Beda Leon Sieber	Switzerland	136.05	9	58.90	16	77.15
15	Iryna Pidgayna; Artem Koval	Ukraine	134.79	19	51.16	12	83.63
16	Kim Jin-ny; Lee Na-mu	South Korea	134.43	15	54.73	15	79.70
17	Alisa Korneva; Kieran MacDonald	Canada	130.18	18	53.08	17	77.10
18	Sofiia Beznosikova; Max Leleu	Belgium	129.30	17	53.62	18	75.68
19	Sofiia Dovhal; Wiktor Kulesza	Poland	128.30	16	54.19	19	74.11
20	Natálie Blaasová; Filip Blaas	Czech Republic	119.98	20	49.69	20	70.29
21	Kristina Dobroserdova; Alessandro Pellegrini	Armenia	49.14	21	49.14	Did not advance to free dance	
22	Mariia Alieva; Yehor Barshak	Georgia	48.93	22	48.93	Did not advance to free dance	
23	Hilda Taylor; Nolen Hickey	Finland	47.26	23	47.26	Did not advance to free dance	
24	Irmak Yücel; Danil Pak	Turkey	46.89	24	46.89	Did not advance to free dance	
25	Lauren Audrey Baťková; Jacob Yang	Czech Republic	45.53	25	45.53	Did not advance to free dance	
26	Molly Hairsine; Alessio Surenkov-Gultchev	Great Britain	44.19	26	44.19	Did not advance to free dance	
27	Eliška Žáková; Filip Mencl	Czech Republic	44.06	27	44.06	Did not advance to free dance	
28	Anita Straub; Andreas Straub	Austria	43.31	28	43.31	Did not advance to free dance	
29	Sarah Marcilly Vázquez; Jolen Engel	Spain	42.81	29	42.81	Did not advance to free dance	
30	Catharina Guedes Tibau; Cayden Dawson	Brazil	39.62	30	39.62	Did not advance to free dance	
31	Ksenia Sipunova; Miron Korjagin	Estonia	34.58	31	34.58	Did not advance to free dance	

== See also ==
- List of sporting events in Taiwan
