= Brunilde Bianchi =

Italian ice dancing coach

Personal information
- Other names: Brunhilde Bianchi
- Born: 22 December 1964 (age 61) Pavullo nel Frignano, Italy

Figure skating career
- Country: Italy
- Partner: Valter Rizzo

Brunilde Bianchi (born 22 December 1964 in Pavullo nel Frignano) is an Italian ice dancing coach, choreographer, and former competitor. With Valter Rizzo, she competed at two European Championships, placing 20th in 1984 (Budapest, Hungary) and 13th in 1985 (Gothenburg, Sweden).

Bianchi began coaching in 1988 in Rome. Her students have included Federica Faiella / Massimo Scali, Alessia Aureli / Andrea Vaturi, Isabella Pajardi / Stefano Caruso, Sofia Sforza / Francesco Fioretti, and Sara Ghislandi / Giona Terzo Ortenzi. As of 2016, she is listed as a Level 3 coach by the Italian ice sports federation (FISG) and is based at S.S.D. S.r.l. Icelab in Bergamo.

Bianchi and Valter Rizzo are the parents of Italian skater Matteo Rizzo.
