= 2025 Cup of China =

International figure skating competition

- Cup of China logo
- Type: Grand Prix
- Date: 24 – 26 October
- Season: 2025–26
- Location: Chongqing, China
- Host: Chinese Skating Association
- Venue: Chongqing Huaxi Culture and Sports Center

Champions
- Men's singles: (Japan) Shun Sato
- Women's singles: (United States) Amber Glenn
- Pairs: (Georgia (country)) Anastasiia Metelkina and Luka Berulava
- Ice dance: (United States) Madison Chock and Evan Bates
- Previous: 2024 Cup of China
- Next: 2026 Cup of China
- Previous Grand Prix: 2025 Grand Prix de France
- Next Grand Prix: 2025 Skate Canada International

The 2025 Cup of China is a figure skating competition sanctioned by the International Skating Union (ISU). Organized and hosted by the Chinese Skating Association (simplified Chinese: 中国滑冰协会; traditional Chinese: 中國滑冰協會), it was the second event of the 2025–26 Grand Prix of Figure Skating: a senior-level international invitational competition series. It was held from 24 to 26 October 2025 at the Chongqing Huaxi Culture and Sports Center in Chongqing. Medals were awarded in men's singles, women's singles, pair skating, and ice dance. Skaters earned points based on their results, and the top skaters or teams in each discipline at the end of the season were then invited to compete at the 2025–26 Grand Prix Final in Nagoya, Japan. Shun Sato of Japan won the men's event, Amber Glenn of the United States won the women's event, Anastasiia Metelkina and Luka Berulava of Georgia won the pairs event, and Madison Chock and Evan Bates of the United States won the ice dance event.

== Background ==
The ISU Grand Prix of Figure Skating is a series of seven events sanctioned by the International Skating Union (ISU) and held during the autumn: six qualifying events and the Grand Prix of Figure Skating Final. This allows skaters to perfect their programs earlier in the season, as well as compete against the skaters whom they would later encounter at the World Championships. Skaters earn points based on their results in their respective competitions and after the six qualifying events, the top skaters or teams in each discipline are invited to compete at the Grand Prix Final. The Cup of China debuted as a Grand Prix event in 2003 as a replacement for the Bofrost Cup on Ice. The 2025 Cup of China was the second event of the 2025–26 Grand Prix of Figure Skating series, and was held from 24 to 26 October 2025 at the Chongqing Huaxi Culture and Sports Center in Chongqing.

== Changes to preliminary assignments ==
The International Skating Union published the initial list of entrants on 6 June 2025.

Discipline	Withdrew		Added		Notes	Ref.
Discipline	Date	Skater(s)	Date	Skater(s)	Notes	Ref.
Pairs	13 August	(Uzbekistan); Ekaterina Geynish; Dmitrii Chigirev	14 August	(Italy); Lucrezia Beccari; Matteo Guarise	—N/a	
Men	—N/a		18 August	(China); Peng Zhiming	Host picks	
Women	—N/a		18 August	(China); An Xiangyi	Host picks	
Women	—N/a		18 August	(China); Zhang Ruiyang	Host picks	
Pairs	—N/a		18 August	(China); Zhang Jiaxuan; Huang Yihang	Host picks	
Ice dance	—N/a		18 August	(China); Wang Shiyue; Liu Xinyu	Host picks	
Pairs	—N/a		22 August	(Italy); Rebecca Ghilardi; Filippo Ambrosini	—N/a	
Pairs	24 September	(Canada); Fiona Bombardier; Benjamin Mimar	25 September	(Germany); Annika Hocke; Robert Kunkel	—N/a	
Men	13 October	(United States); Camden Pulkinen	14 October	(United States); Tomoki Hiwatashi	Injury (Pulkinen)	
Women	14 October	(Switzerland); Kimmy Repond	15 October	(Italy); Anna Pezzetta	Injury (Repond)	
Women	21 October	(China); An Xiangyi	—N/a		Injury	

== Required performance elements ==
=== Single skating ===
Men and women competing in single skating performed their short programs on 24 October. Lasting 2 minutes 40 seconds (+/− 10 seconds), the short program had to include the following elements:

For men: one double or triple Axel; one triple or quadruple jump; one jump combination consisting of a double jump and a triple jump, two triple jumps, or a quadruple jump and a double jump or triple jump; one flying spin; one camel spin or sit spin with a change of foot; one spin combination with a change of foot; and a step sequence using the full ice surface.

For women: one double or triple Axel; one triple jump; one jump combination consisting of a double jump and a triple jump, or two triple jumps; one flying spin; one layback spin, sideways leaning spin, camel spin, or sit spin without a change of foot; one spin combination with a change of foot; and one step sequence using the full ice surface.

Men and women performed their free skates on 25 October. Lasting 4 minutes (+/− 10 seconds), the free skate had to include the following: seven jump elements, of which one had to be an Axel-type jump; three spins, of which one had to be a spin combination, one a flying spin, and one a spin with only one position; a step sequence; and a choreographic sequence.

=== Pairs ===
Couples competing in pair skating performed their short programs on 24 October. Lasting 2 minutes 40 seconds (+/− 10 seconds), the short program had to include the following elements: one pair lift, one double or triple twist lift, one double or triple throw jump, one double or triple solo jump, one solo spin combination with a change of foot, one death spiral, and a step sequence using the full ice surface.

Couples performed their free skates on 25 October. Lasting 4 minutes (+/− 10 seconds), the free skate had to include the following: three pair lifts, of which one had to be a twist lift; two different throw jumps; one solo jump; one jump combination or sequence; one pair spin combination; one death spiral; and a choreographic sequence.

=== Ice dance ===
Couples competing in ice dance performed their rhythm dances on 24 October. Lasting 2 minutes 50 seconds (+/− 10 seconds), the theme of the rhythm dance this season was "music, dance styles, and feeling of the 1990s". Examples of applicable dance styles and music included pop, Latin, house, techno, hip-hop, and grunge. The rhythm dance had to include the following elements: one pattern dance step sequence, one choreographic rhythm sequence, one dance lift, one set of sequential twizzles, and one step sequence.

Couples then performed their free dances on 25 October. Lasting 4 minutes (+/− 10 seconds), the free dance had to include the following: three dance lifts or one short lift and one combination lift; one dance spin; one set of synchronized twizzles; one step sequence in hold; one step sequence while on one skate and not in hold, and three choreographic elements.

== Judging ==
Skaters were judged according to the required technical elements of their program (such as jumps and spins), as well as the overall presentation of their program, based on three program components (skating skills, presentation, and composition). Each technical element in a figure skating performance was assigned a predetermined base point value and scored by a panel of nine judges on a scale from −5 to +5 based on the quality of its execution. Each Grade of Execution (GOE) from –5 to +5 was assigned a value as indicated on the Scale of Values. For example, a triple Axel was worth a base value of 8.00 points, and a GOE of +3 was worth 2.40 points, so a triple Axel with a GOE of +3 earned 10.40 points. The judging panel's GOE for each element was determined by calculating the trimmed mean (the average after discarding the highest and lowest scores). The panel's scores for all elements were added together to generate a Total Elements Score. At the same time, the judges evaluated each performance based on the five aforementioned program components and assigned each a score from 0.25 to 10 in 0.25-point increments. The judging panel's final score for each program component was also determined by calculating the trimmed mean. Those scores were then multiplied by the factor shown on the chart below; the results were added together to generate a total Program Component Score.

Program component factoring
Discipline	Short program or Rhythm dance	Free skate or Free dance
Men	1.67	3.33
Women	1.33	2.67
Pairs	1.33	2.67
Ice dance	1.33	2.00

Deductions were applied for certain violations, such as time infractions or falls. The Total Elements Score and Program Component Score were then added together, minus any deductions, to generate a final performance score for each skater or team.

== Medal summary ==
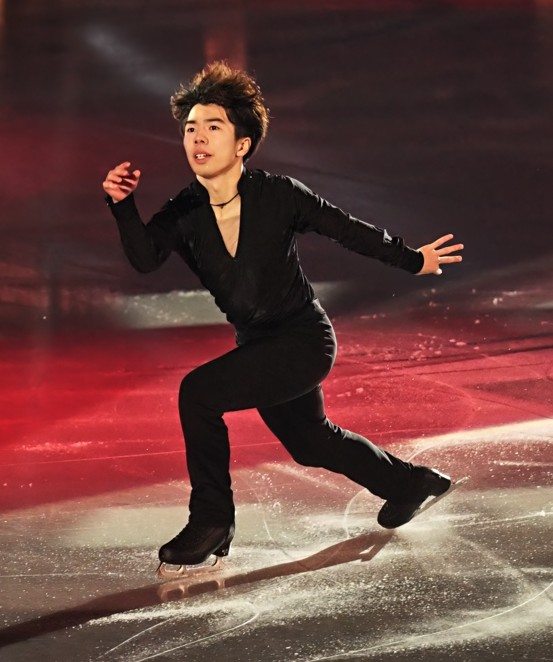
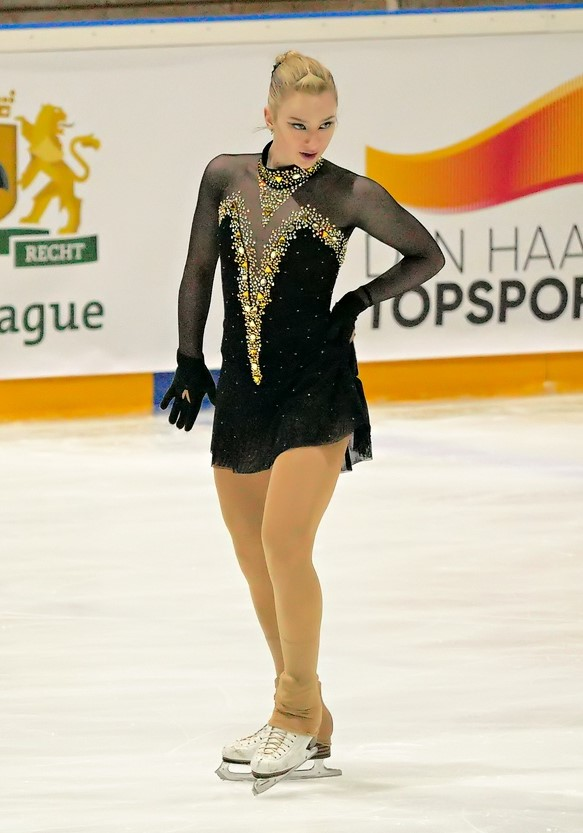
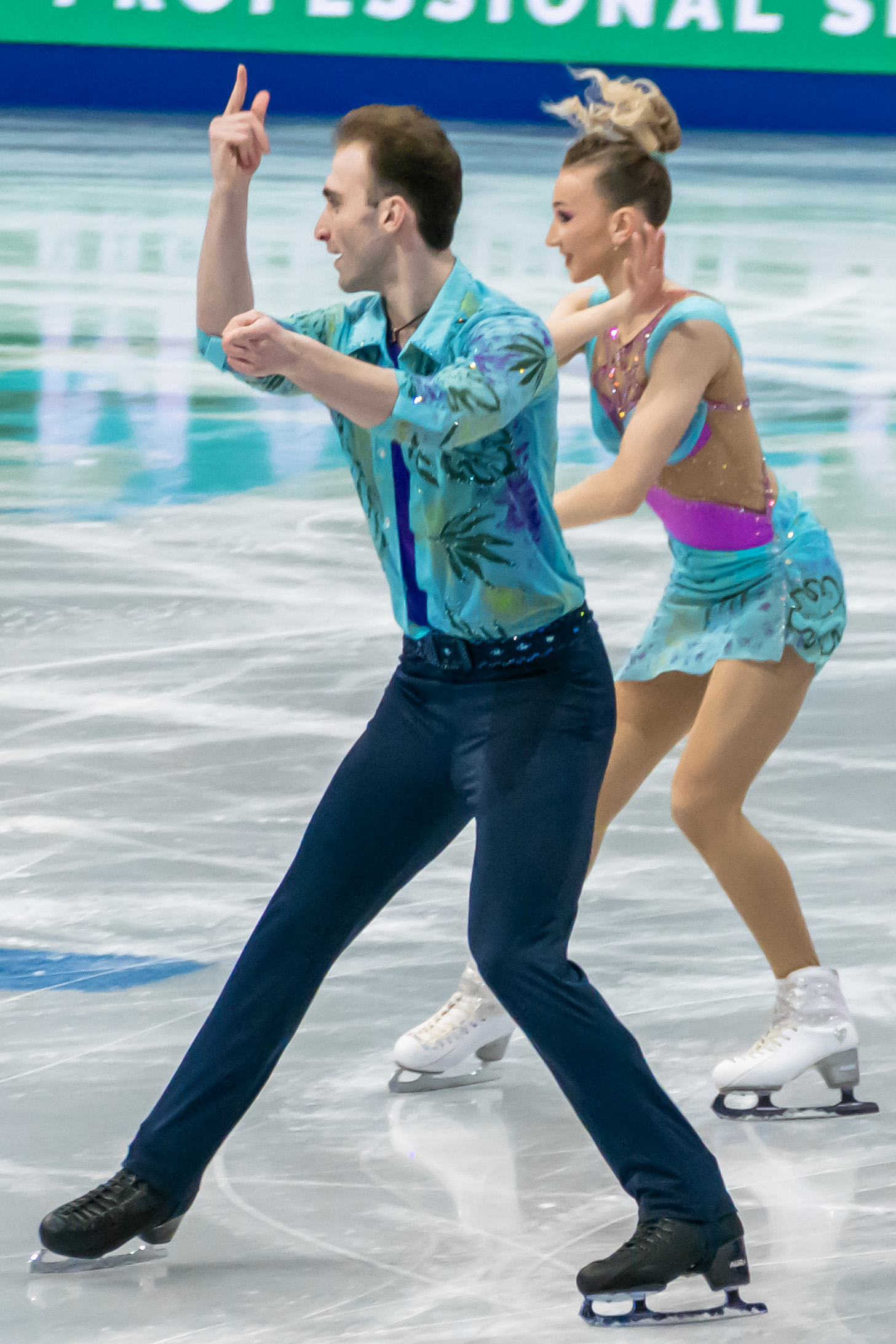
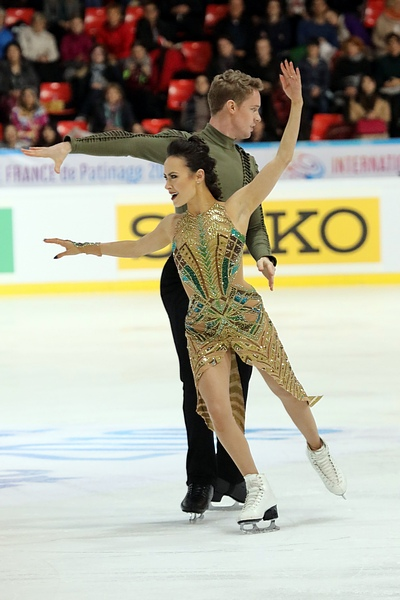
The 2025 Cup of China champions: Shun Sato of Japan (men's singles); Amber Glenn of the United States (women's singles); Anastasiia Metelkina and Luka Berulava of Georgia (pair skating); and Madison Chock and Evan Bates of the United States (ice dance)

Medalists
Discipline	Gold	Silver	Bronze
Men	(Japan) Shun Sato	(Italy) Daniel Grassl	(Kazakhstan) Mikhail Shaidorov
Women	(United States) Amber Glenn	(United States) Alysa Liu	(Japan) Rinka Watanabe
Pairs	(Georgia (country)); Anastasiia Metelkina; Luka Berulava	(Italy); Sara Conti; Niccolò Macii	(China); Sui Wenjing; Han Cong
Ice dance	(United States); Madison Chock; Evan Bates	(United States); Emilea Zingas; Vadym Kolesnik	(France); Evgeniia Lopareva; Geoffrey Brissaud

== Results ==
=== Men's singles ===
Shun Sato of Japan won the men's event; his free skate was described by the Japan Wire as "faultless" and included a quadruple Lutz and two quadruple toe loops. Daniel Grassl of Italy finished in second place with a free skate performance that included a quadruple Lutz, a quadruple loop, a quadruple Salchow, and two triple Axels. Mikhail Shaidorov of Kazakhstan finished in third place. "I am satisfied with my skate, even though I was a bit nervous. There were some small mistakes, but I didn't really feel them myself," Shaidorov stated afterward.

Men's results
Rank	Skater	Nation	Total points	SP		FS	
1st place, gold medalist(s)	Shun Sato	Japan	278.12	1	94.13	1	183.99
2nd place, silver medalist(s)	Daniel Grassl	Italy	269.43	2	90.42	2	179.01
3rd place, bronze medalist(s)	Mikhail Shaidorov	Kazakhstan	262.67	3	88.33	3	174.34
4	Tomoki Hiwatashi	United States	245.71	6	79.07	4	166.64
5	Jin Boyang	China	232.81	5	86.62	7	146.19
6	Vladimir Litvintsev	Azerbaijan	222.64	8	73.84	6	148.80
7	Jacob Sanchez	United States	221.21	9	72.40	5	148.81
8	Cha Jun-hwan	South Korea	217.53	7	75.61	8	141.92
9	Sōta Yamamoto	Japan	211.67	4	87.57	11	124.10
10	Deniss Vasiļjevs	Latvia	204.51	11	66.54	9	137.97
11	Dai Daiwei	China	197.54	12	61.82	10	135.72
12	Peng Zhiming	China	184.52	10	67.41	12	117.11

=== Women's singles ===
Amber Glenn and Alysa Liu, both of the United States, won the gold and silver medals, respectively. Glenn, who had won the 2024 Grand Prix of Figure Skating Final, successfully performed a triple Axel in both the short program and free skate. "I'm just really happy with the overall results and showing the consistency that I've been working on with my team in practice every day," Glenn stated afterward. Liu, who had won the 2025 World Figure Skating Championships, had been in first place after the short program, but stumbled on a triple Lutz, allowing Glenn to surpass her. Rinka Watanabe of Japan finished in third place despite falling on her opening triple jump combination.

Women's results
Rank	Skater	Nation	Total points	SP		FS	
1st place, gold medalist(s)	Amber Glenn	United States	214.78	3	73.04	1	141.74
2nd place, silver medalist(s)	Alysa Liu	United States	212.07	1	74.61	2	137.46
3rd place, bronze medalist(s)	Rinka Watanabe	Japan	198.63	2	74.01	5	124.62
4	Anastasiia Gubanova	Georgia	197.88	5	66.28	3	131.60
5	Shin Ji-a	South Korea	195.43	4	68.01	4	127.42
6	Rino Matsuike	Japan	188.06	6	65.91	6	122.15
7	Zhang Ruiyang	China	179.54	10	61.71	7	117.83
8	Anna Pezzetta	Italy	178.34	9	61.89	8	116.45
9	Lee Hae-in	South Korea	177.32	7	65.46	10	111.86
10	Hana Yoshida	Japan	176.54	11	61.47	9	115.07
11	Zhu Yi	China	162.66	8	63.39	11	99.27

=== Pairs ===
Anastasiia Metelkina and Luka Berulava of Georgia scored a new personal best in their short program, finishing first in both segments, despite a fall on the final jump of their triple Salchow-double Axel-double Axel jump sequence. "I'm glad we fought for this gold medal and didn't give up after the mistake on the jump," Berulava stated afterward. Sara Conti and Niccolò Macii of Italy finished in second place despite an error on a throw triple Salchow during their short program and their throw triple loop and throw triple Salchow during their free skate. Sui Wenjing and Han Cong of China, gold medalists at the 2022 Winter Olympics, returned to competition after a three-year retirement. They placed third in the short program after Sui fell on her opening jump, and ultimately finished third after the free skate. "I wasn't nervous today. It's true, we haven't competed for a long time, but I really enjoyed that," Sui stated afterward.

Pairs results
Rank	Team	Nation	Total points	SP		FS	
1st place, gold medalist(s)	Anastasiia Metelkina; Luka Berulava	Georgia	217.24	1	77.77	1	139.47
2nd place, silver medalist(s)	Sara Conti; Niccolò Macii	Italy	209.88	2	73.41	2	136.47
3rd place, bronze medalist(s)	Sui Wenjing; Han Cong	China	202.92	3	72.45	3	130.47
4	Zhang Jiaxuan; Huang Yihang	China	195.41	5	68.96	4	126.45
5	Rebecca Ghilardi; Filippo Ambrosini	Italy	186.85	7	64.60	5	122.25
6	Annika Hocke; Robert Kunkel	Germany	183.74	6	65.22	6	118.52
7	Katie McBeath; Daniil Parkman	United States	181.70	4	69.18	7	112.52
WD	Lucrezia Beccari; Matteo Guarise	Italy	Withdrew	8	55.67	Withdrew from competition	

=== Ice dance ===
Madison Chock and Evan Bates of the United States, three-time World Championship gold medalists, won the ice dance event in their Grand Prix debut. "It felt really good to perform our flamenco for the first time here," Chock stated afterward. "We feel like this was a great start to our season and we're excited to get back home and bring more work before Skate America." Emilea Zingas and Vadym Kolesnik, also of the United States, finished in second place, setting a new personal-best score in the rhythm dance in the process. Zingas and Kolesnik were also forced to improvise when their skating costumes were not ready in time for the competition, so they cobbled new outfits together from previous costumes and clothing bought at retail. Evgeniia Lopareva and Geoffrey Brissaud of France finished in third place.

Caroline Green and Michael Parsons of the United States, who had been in seventh place after the rhythm dance, withdrew from the competition after sustaining an injury.

Ice dance results
Rank	Team	Nation	Total points	RD		FD	
1st place, gold medalist(s)	Madison Chock; Evan Bates	United States	208.25	1	84.44	1	123.81
2nd place, silver medalist(s)	Emilea Zingas; Vadym Kolesnik	United States	202.27	2	80.43	2	121.84
3rd place, bronze medalist(s)	Evgeniia Lopareva; Geoffrey Brissaud	France	196.60	3	77.62	4	118.98
4	Olivia Smart; Tim Dieck	Spain	187.51	6	67.37	3	120.14
5	Hannah Lim; Ye Quan	South Korea	185.79	5	73.68	5	112.11
6	Loïcia Demougeot; Théo le Mercier	France	184.20	4	74.32	6	109.88
7	Wang Shiyue; Liu Xinyu	China	165.71	8	62.68	7	103.03
8	Ren Junfei; Xing Jianing	China	153.17	9	59.74	8	93.43
9	Xiao Zixi; He Linghao	China	143.92	10	58.61	9	85.31
WD	Caroline Green; Michael Parsons	United States	Withdrew	7	65.83	Withdrew from competition	

== Works cited ==
- "Special Regulations & Technical Rules – Single & Pair Skating and Ice Dance 2024" (PDF). International Skating Union. Archived (PDF) from the original on 3 June 2025.
