= Steven Adcock =

British-South Korean pair skater

Personal information
- Born: 26 April 1995 (age 31) Chelmsford, United Kingdom
- Home town: Waterloo
- Height: 1.76 m (5 ft 9 1/2 in)

Figure skating career
- Country: South Korea
- Coach: Andrew Evans, Alexander Sheldrik-Male, Dima Savin
- Skating club: Kitchener Waterloo Skating Club
- Began skating: 2001
- Retired: 2023
Medal record
Figure skating: Pairs
Representing South Korea
World Team Trophy
Silver medal – second place	2023 Tokyo	Team

Steven Adcock (born 26 April 1995) is a British former pair skater who represented South Korea. With his former skating partner, Cho Hye-jin, he is the 2023 South Korean champion.

== Personal life ==
Adcock was born on 26 April 1995 in Chelmsford, United Kingdom. He works as a coach.

== Career ==
=== Early years ===
Adcock started skating in 2001, first training in singles.

Adcock competed as a single skater until 2010 when he switched to pair skating, first partnering with Amber Ferguson and competing at the novice level for two years. He teamed up with Robynne Tweedale in 2012 and competed at the junior level, winning the 2013 British Championships and placing 10th at the 2013 JGP Slovakia.

Adcock teamed up with Annie Royapen in 2014 and split in the same season. He then partnered with Chloe Curtin for the 2015–16 season.

=== 2015–16 season ===
Curtin and Adcock made their Junior Grand Prix debut at the 2015 JGP Poland. The team placed eighth in both short and free program. After winning the 2016 British Championships, they were selected for the 2016 World Junior Championships in Debrecen, Hungary, where they finished in 12th place.

They ended their partnership in the same season. Adcock moved to Canada in 2016 to team up with Mariah McCaw for Canada.

=== 2017–18 season ===
McCaw and Adcock made their debut in 2018 Canadian Championships representing Ontario, where they finished in fourth place.

=== 2018–19 season ===
McCaw/Adcock competed as senior skaters at the 2019 Canadian Championships, finishing last. Their partnership ended in 2019 and a year later Adcock teamed up with Patricia Andrew, also for Canada.

=== 2021–22 season ===
Due to the COVID-19 pandemic, Andrew/Adcock made their debut only in 2021–22 season. Competing at the 2022 Skate Canada Challenge, a domestic competition in Canada, they won the bronze medal. A month later, they finished in fifth place at the 2022 Canadian Championships. Andrew and Adcock's partnership ended in the same year.

=== 2022–23 season ===
In September 2022, coach Andrew Evans announced Cho Hye-jin and Adcock as a new pair team for South Korea.

Cho and Adcock debuted at the 2023 South Korean Championships and won, as they were the only pair team. After South Korea qualified to the 2023 World Team Trophy, the first time the nation had reached the event in its history, Cho/Adcock were named to the team as the pairs entry. They finished sixth in both segments of the competition, while Team South Korea won the silver medal. This made Korea only the fifth country to reach the podium at the event. Adcock said that the team's priority over the summer was working to add a second triple throw to their free program.

Cho and Adcock ended their partnership two weeks later after 2023 World Team Trophy. Adcock retired due to a back injury.

== Programs ==
=== With Cho ===
Season	Short program	Free skating	Exhibition
2022–2023	Nero by Nick Phoenix choreo. by Mary Angela Larmer	Piano Concerto No. 2 by Sergei Rachmaninoff choreo. by Pavol Poráč	Nero by Nick Phoenix choreo. by Mary Angela Larmer

=== With Curtin ===
Season	Short program	Free skating
2015–2016	Jailhouse Rock by Elvis Presley choreo. by Daniel Thomas	Les Misérables by Claude-Michel Schönberg choreo. by Daniel Thomas

=== With Tweedale ===
Season	Short program	Free skating
2013–2014	Roxanne by Max Olsen choreo. by Daniel Thomas	Van Helsing by Alan Silvestri choreo. by Daniel Thomas

== Competitive highlights ==
=== With Cho for South Korea ===
National
Event	22–23
South Korean Champ.	1st
Team events
World Team Trophy	2nd T 6th P
T = Team Result; P = Personal result. Medals awarded for team result only.

=== With Andrew for Canada ===
National
Event	2021–22
Canadian Champ.	5th
SC Challenge	3rd

=== With McCaw for Canada ===
National
Event	2017–18	2018–19
Canadian Champ.	4th J	6th
Levels: J = Junior

=== With Curtin for United Kingdom ===
JGP: Junior Grand Prix

International: Junior
Event	2015–16
Junior Worlds	12th
JGP Poland	8th
Bavarian Open	4th
National
British Champ.	1st J
J = Junior level

=== With Royapen for United Kingdom ===
National
Event	2014–15
British Champ.	1st J
J = Junior level

=== With Tweedale for United Kingdom ===
JGP: Junior Grand Prix

International: Junior
Event	2012–13	2013–14
JGP Slovakia		10th
National
British Championships	1st J	
J = Junior level

=== With Ferguson for United Kingdom ===
National
Event	2010–11	2011–12
British Champ.	2nd N	1st N
N = Novice level

=== Men's singles ===
International
Event	2009–10	2012–13	2013–14	2014–15
Ice Challenge	4th N	14th J		
National
British Championships	5th N	8th J	4th J	8th
N = Novice level; J = Junior level

== Detailed results ==
Current personal best scores are highlighted in bold.

=== With Cho ===
**2022–23 season**
Date	Event	SP	FS	Total
April 13–16, 2023	2023 World Team Trophy	6; **60.55**	6; **102.27**	2T / 6P; **162.82**
January 5–8, 2023	2023 South Korean Championships	1; 52.64	1; 104.66	1; 157.30
