= 2023 ISU World Team Trophy in Figure Skating =

Figure skating competition

2023 World Team Trophy
- Type: ISU Event
- Date: April 13 – 16
- Season: 2022–23
- Location: Tokyo, Japan
- Host: Japan Skating Federation
- Venue: Tokyo Metropolitan Gymnasium
- Previous: 2021 ISU World Team Trophy
- Next: 2025 ISU World Team Trophy

The 2023 ISU World Team Trophy is an international figure skating competition that was held from April 13–16, 2023 in Tokyo, Japan. The top six International Skating Union members were invited to compete in a team format with points awarded based on skaters' placement. Participating countries selected two men's single skaters, two women' single skaters, one pair, and one ice dance entry for their team.

== Scoring ==
Skaters competed in both the short program/rhythm dance and the free skating/free dance segments for their team. Each segment was scored separately. The points earned per placement are as follows:

Placement	Points (Singles)	Points (Pairs/Dance)
1st	12	
2nd	11	
3rd	10	
4th	9	
5th	8	
6th	7	
7th	6	—N/a
8th	5	—N/a
9th	4	—N/a
10th	3	—N/a
11th	2	—N/a
12th	1	—N/a

Tie-breaking within a segment:

1. If two or more skaters, pairs, or ice dance couples have the same rank in the short program or rhythm dance, then the total technical score will be used to break ties.
2. If two or more skaters, pairs, or ice dance couples have the same rank in the free skating or free dance, then the total components score will be used to break ties.

If these results do not break the tie, the competitors concerned will be considered tied. The team points will be awarded according to the placement of the skaters/couples in each discipline.

Tie-breaking within team standings:

1. The highest total team points from the two best places in different disciplines of the current phase will break the ties.
2. If they remain tied, the highest total segment scores of the two best places according to the team points in different disciplines of the current phase will break the ties.
3. If they remain tied, the highest total team points from the three best places in different disciplines of the current phase will break the ties.
4. If they remain tied, the highest total segment scores of the three best places according to the team points in different disciplines of the current phase will break the ties.

If these criteria fail to break the ties, the teams will be considered as tied.

== Qualification ==
Qualified to World Team Trophy

Rank	Team	(Junior) Grand Prix and Final						ISU Championships						Total
Rank	Team	Men		Women		Pairs	Ice dance	Men		Women		Pairs	Ice dance	Total
1	Japan	800	720	800	583	800	236	1200	709	1200	787	1200	418	9453
2	United States	648	262	720	360	720	720	972	787	875	377	1080	1200	8721
3	Canada	292	262	262	191	583	800	638	402	362	339	875	972	5978
4	South Korea	324	292	472	324		250	1080	496	1080	709		450	5477
5	Italy	472	324			648	648	517	377	222		972	1080	5260
6	France	400	324	191	148	360	324	875	465	174		305	377	3943
7	Georgia	262	191	324	203	324	236	446	162	305	215	180	339	3187
8	Switzerland	236	182	182	133		120	574	450	574	140			2591
9	Germany			236	97	360	250	180		638		517	275	2553
10	Great Britain					213	583	93	83	126		247	875	2200
11	China	225	97	164	97	164	213	239	131	295		222		1847
12	Finland	164		133	133		324	214		146			517	1631

- For a team to be qualified it must obtain points in at least three of the four disciplines. This chart only include top twelve teams able to do so.
- Although a qualified team can participate with two single skaters each women and men, one pair and one ice dance couple, the qualification the highest points per discipline will be used. This means that more and different skaters/couples per ISU Member may contribute to the total qualification points. Practically, two to four men's single skaters, two to four women's single skaters, one to two pairs and one to two ice dance couples could contribute to the total points.

== Records ==
For complete list of figure skating records, see list of highest scores in figure skating.

The following new ISU best scores were set during this competition:

Discipline	Component	Skater(s)	Score	Date	Ref
Ice dance	Rhythm dance	(United States) Madison Chock / Evan Bates	93.91	April 13, 2023	
Ice dance	Free dance	(United States) Madison Chock / Evan Bates	138.41	April 14, 2023	
Ice dance	Total score	(United States) Madison Chock / Evan Bates	232.32	April 14, 2023	

== Entries ==
Names with an asterisk (*) denote the team captain.

Teams began announcing their entries after the 2023 World Championships.

Country	Men	Women	Pairs	Ice dance
Canada	Stephen Gogolev; Keegan Messing	Sara-Maude Dupuis; Madeline Schizas	Deanna Stellato-Dudek / Maxime Deschamps	Piper Gilles* / Paul Poirier
France	Kévin Aymoz*; Adam Siao Him Fa	Lorine Schild; Léa Serna	Camille Kovalev / Pavel Kovalev	Evgenia Lopareva / Geoffrey Brissaud
Italy	Daniel Grassl; Matteo Rizzo	Lara Naki Gutmann; Anna Pezzetta	Sara Conti / Niccolò Macii	Charlène Guignard / Marco Fabbri*
Japan	Shun Sato; Kazuki Tomono	Mai Mihara; Kaori Sakamoto*	Riku Miura / Ryuichi Kihara	Kana Muramoto / Daisuke Takahashi
South Korea	Cha Jun-hwan*; Lee Si-hyeong	Kim Ye-lim; Lee Hae-in	Cho Hye-jin / Steven Adcock	Hannah Lim / Ye Quan
United States	Jason Brown*; Ilia Malinin	Amber Glenn; Isabeau Levito	Alexa Knierim / Brandon Frazier	Madison Chock / Evan Bates

=== Changes to preliminary entries ===
Date	Discipline	Withdrew	Added	Reason/Other notes	Refs
April 10, 2023	Men	(Japan) Shoma Uno	(Japan) Shun Sato	Ankle injury	

== Results ==
=== Team standings ===
Rank	Team	Men		Women		Pairs		Ice dance		Total team points
Rank	Team	SP	FS	SP	FS	SP	FS	RD	FD	Total team points
1	United States	12	10	10	9	12	12	12	12	120
1	United States	9	8	7	7	12	12	12	12	120
2	South Korea	11	12	12	12	7	7	7	7	95
2	South Korea	3	1	6	10	7	7	7	7	95
3	Japan	6	5	11	11	11	11	9	8	94
3	Japan	2	4	8	8	11	11	9	8	94
4	Italy	7	11	4	5	9	10	11	11	83
4	Italy	5	7	1	2	9	10	11	11	83
5	France	10	9	5	6	8	8	8	9	80
5	France	8	3	3	3	8	8	8	9	80
6	Canada	4	6	9	4	10	9	10	10	68
6	Canada	1	2	2	1	10	9	10	10	68

=== Men ===
Rank	Name	Nation	Total points	SP		Team points	FS		Team points
1	Cha Jun-hwan	South Korea	289.15	2	101.33	11	1	187.82	12
2	Ilia Malinin	United States	279.54	1	105.90	12	5	173.64	8
3	Kévin Aymoz	France	279.43	3	100.58	10	4	178.85	9
4	Jason Brown	United States	279.04	4	95.61	9	3	183.43	10
5	Matteo Rizzo	Italy	275.36	8	88.01	5	2	187.35	11
6	Daniel Grassl	Italy	263.34	6	89.81	7	6	173.53	7
7	Kazuki Tomono	Japan	253.91	7	89.36	6	9	164.55	4
8	Keegan Messing	Canada	252.74	9	79.75	4	7	172.99	6
9	Adam Siao Him Fa	France	247.42	5	92.82	8	10	154.60	3
10	Shun Sato	Japan	241.31	11	76.45	2	8	164.86	5
11	Lee Si-hyeong	South Korea	202.06	10	77.24	3	12	124.82	1
12	Stephen Gogolev	Canada	174.95	12	49.78	1	11	125.17	2

=== Women ===
Rank	Name	Nation	Total points	SP		Team points	FS		Team points
1	Lee Hae-in	South Korea	225.47	1	76.90	12	1	148.57	12
2	Kaori Sakamoto	Japan	218.44	2	72.69	11	2	145.75	11
3	Isabeau Levito	United States	213.87	3	71.22	10	4	142.65	9
4	Kim Ye-lim	South Korea	206.24	7	62.65	6	3	143.59	10
5	Mai Mihara	Japan	198.06	5	66.85	8	5	131.21	8
6	Amber Glenn	United States	195.01	6	66.55	7	6	128.46	7
7	Madeline Schizas	Canada	184.88	4	69.76	9	9	115.12	4
8	Léa Serna	France	177.72	8	60.18	5	7	117.54	6
9	Lorine Schild	France	170.00	10	55.72	3	10	114.28	3
10	Lara Naki Gutmann	Italy	167.95	12	51.12	1	8	116.83	5
11	Anna Pezzetta	Italy	162.43	9	56.13	4	11	106.30	2
12	Sara-Maude Dupuis	Canada	148.75	11	54.31	2	12	94.44	1

=== Pairs ===
Rank	Name	Nation	Total points	SP		Team points	FS		Team points
1	Alexa Knierim / Brandon Frazier	United States	230.12	1	82.25	12	1	147.87	12
2	Riku Miura / Ryuichi Kihara	Japan	224.16	2	80.47	11	2	143.69	11
3	Sara Conti / Niccolò Macii	Italy	200.06	4	69.84	9	3	130.22	10
4	Deanna Stellato-Dudek / Maxime Deschamps	Canada	199.93	3	70.20	10	4	129.73	9
5	Camille Kovalev / Pavel Kovalev	France	178.38	5	63.60	8	5	114.78	8
6	Cho Hye-jin / Steven Adcock	South Korea	162.82	6	60.55	7	6	102.27	7

=== Ice dance ===
Rank	Name	Nation	Total points	RD		Team points	FD		Team points
1	Madison Chock / Evan Bates	United States	232.32; WR	1	93.91; WR	12	1	138.41; WR	12
2	Charlene Guignard / Marco Fabbri	Italy	223.24	2	90.90	11	2	132.34	11
3	Piper Gilles / Paul Poirier	Canada	216.85	3	88.37	10	3	128.48	10
4	Kana Muramoto / Daisuke Takahashi	Japan	195.01	4	78.38	9	5	116.63	8
5	Evgenia Lopareva / Geoffrey Brissaud	France	194.67	5	76.15	8	4	118.52	9
6	Hannah Lim / Ye Quan	South Korea	179.23	6	69.96	7	6	109.27	7

== Medalists ==
Gold	Silver	Bronze
United States; Jason Brown; Ilia Malinin; Amber Glenn; Isabeau Levito; Alexa Knierim / Brandon Frazier; Madison Chock / Evan Bates	South Korea; Cha Jun-hwan; Lee Si-hyeong; Kim Ye-lim; Lee Hae-in; Cho Hye-jin / Steven Adcock; Hannah Lim / Ye Quan	Japan; Shun Sato; Kazuki Tomono; Mai Mihara; Kaori Sakamoto; Riku Miura / Ryuichi Kihara; Kana Muramoto / Daisuke Takahashi
