= 2023 South Korean Figure Skating Championships =

Figure skating competition

2022 South Korean Figure Skating Championships
- Type: National championship
- Date: January 5 – 8
- Season: 2022–23
- Location: Uijeongbu, South Korea
- Host: Korean Skating Union
- Venue: Uijeongbu Indoor Ice Rink

Champions
- Men's singles: Cha Jun-hwan (S); Choi Ha-bin (J)
- Women's singles: Shin Ji-a (S); Kim Yu-seong (J)
- Pairs: Cho Hye-jin / Steven Adcock (S)
- Ice dance: Hannah Lim / Ye Quan (J)
- Previous: 2022 South Korean Championships
- Next: 2024 South Korean Championships

The 2023 South Korean Figure Skating Championships was held from January 5–8, 2023 at the Uijeongbu Indoor Ice Rink in Uijeongbu. It was the 77th edition of the event. Medals were awarded in the disciplines of men's singles, women's singles, and ice dance on the senior and junior levels. The results were part of the Korean Skating Union's selection criteria for the 2023 World Junior Figure Skating Championships and the 2023 World Championships.

Due to the COVID-19 pandemic in South Korea, spectators followed social distancing and quarantine guidelines.

== Schedule ==
Date	Start	Finish	Discipline	Event
Thursday, January 5	14:20	19:07	Junior women	Short program
Thursday, January 5	19:07	19:43	Junior men	Short program
Thursday, January 5	19:58	20:15	Junior ice dance	Rhythm dance
Thursday, January 5	20:15	20:27	Senior pairs	Short program
Friday, January 6
Friday, January 6	13:00	16:03	Junior women	Free skating
Friday, January 6	16:18	17:00	Junior men	Free skating
Friday, January 6	17:15	17:32	Junior ice dance	Free dance
Friday, January 6	17:32	17:44	Senior pairs	Free skating
Saturday, January 7	11:49	12:55	Senior men	Short program
Saturday, January 7	13:15	16:36	Senior women	Short program
Sunday, January 8	11:45	13:03	Senior men	Free skating
Sunday, January 8	13:18	16:35	Senior women	Free skating
All times are listed in Korea Standard Time (UTC+09:00).

== Medal summary ==
=== Senior ===
Discipline	Gold	Silver	Bronze
Men	Cha Jun-hwan	Kim Hyun-gyeom	Seo Min-kyu
Women	Shin Ji-a	Kim Ye-lim	Lee Hae-in
Pairs	Cho Hye-jin / Steven Adcock	No other competitors	

=== Junior ===
Discipline	Gold	Silver	Bronze
Men	Choi Ha-bin	Park Hyun-seo	Kim Ye-sung
Women	Kim Yu-seong	Lee Ji-yoon	Kim Ye-eun
Ice dance	Hannah Lim / Ye Quan	Kim Jinny / Lee Na-mu	No other competitors

== Entries ==
A list of preliminary entries was published on December 29, 2022.

=== Senior ===
Men	Women	Pairs
Cha Jun-hwan	Choi Da-bin	Cho Hye-jin / Steven Adcock
Cha Young-hyun	Han Hee-sue	
Jeong Deok-hoon	Hong Seung-a	
Kim Han-gil	Hwang Ji-hyun	
Kim Hyun-gyeom	Jeong Ye-an	
Kyeong Jae-seok	Ji Seo-yeon	
Lee Jae-keun	Kim Chae-yeon	
Lim Ju-heon	Kim Min-chae	
Seo Min-kyu	Kim Seo-yeong	
Lee Si-hyeong	Kim Ye-lim	
	Kim Yu-jae	
Ko Na-yeon
Kwon Min-sol
Lee Hae-in
Lee Seo-lang
Lee Si-won
Park Eun-bi
Park Yeon-jeong
Shin Ji-a
Song Si-woo
Wi Seo-yeong
Yook Jeong-min
You Young
Yun Ah-sun
Yun Seo-jin

=== Junior ===
Men	Women	Ice dance
Choi Ha-bin	Baek Kumg-yung	Hannah Lim / Ye Quan
Choi Ye-chang	Cho Chae-yoon	Kim Jinny / Lee Na-mu
Choi Ye-hwang	Hwang Jeong-youl	
Kim Aaron	Hwang Ji-young	
Kim Ye-sung	Hyun Ye-lyn	
Park Hyun-seo	Jun Ji-woo	
	Jun Yeon-sue	
Jung Su-bin
Kim Chan
Kim Ga-hyeon
Kim Hye-seo
Kim Min-jae
Kim So-hee
Kim Ye-eun
Kim Yui
Kwon Su-min
Lee Bo-seul
Lee Eun
Lee Ha-yul
Lee Hyo-rin
Lee Ji-yoon
Lee Min-ju
Lee Rae-in
Lee Seun-gone
Lee Yu-na
Lim Chae-ryeong
Park Che-a
Park Do-hyeon
Park Ha-ram
Park Hyun-a
Park In-kyong
Park Min-seo
Park Seo-hyun
Park Si-eun
Ryu Hee-won
Seo Chae-eun
Yeon Chae-ju
Yu In-seo
Yu Na-yeong

== Senior results ==
=== Senior men ===
Rank	Name	Total points	SP		FS	
1	Cha Jun-hwan	271.21	1	101.04	1	170.17
2	Kim Hyun-gyeom	237.23	3	78.60	3	158.63
3	Seo Min-kyu	235.90	4	76.90	2	159.00
4	Lee Si-hyeong	230.74	2	81.97	5	148.77
5	Kyeong Jae-seok	223.41	5	73.06	4	150.35
6	Cha Young-hyun	212.47	9	69.90	6	142.57
7	Lee Jae-keun	210.74	7	72.18	7	138.56
8	Kim Han-gil	198.29	8	70.75	9	127.54
9	Lim Ju-heon	195.42	6	72.33	10	123.09
10	Jeong Deok-hoon	188.68	10	59.07	8	129.61

=== Senior women ===
Rank	Name	Total points	SP		FS	
1	Shin Ji-a	213.01	2	70.95	1	142.06
2	Kim Ye-lim	210.28	1	71.59	2	138.69
3	Lee Hae-in	205.31	3	70.75	3	134.56
4	Kim Chae-yeon	200.60	4	70.69	6	129.91
5	Kwon Min-sol	196.43	8	64.51	4	131.92
6	Kim Yu-jae	193.97	10	63.33	5	130.64
7	Yun Seo-jin	191.45	7	65.79	7	125.66
8	Yun Ah-sun	190.69	5	66.49	8	124.20
9	Wi Seo-yeong	189.60	6	66.28	9	123.32
10	Han Hee-sue	173.82	18	51.57	10	122.25
11	You Young	172.96	9	64.06	15	108.90
12	Song Si-woo	172.35	14	56.59	12	115.76
13	Kim Min-chae	170.38	16	53.37	11	117.01
14	Choi Da-bin	169.49	12	58.40	14	111.09
15	Park Eun-bi	159.09	21	47.36	13	111.73
16	Kim Seo-yeong	158.22	15	56.56	16	101.66
17	Ko Na-yeon	157.49	11	58.91	17	98.58
18	Hwang Ji-hyun	155.09	13	56.68	18	98.41
19	Lee Seo-lang	147.53	17	52.02	19	95.51
20	Yook Jeong-min	137.43	19	50.58	20	86.85
21	Lee Si-won	132.66	20	48.21	21	84.45
22	Jeong Ye-an	127.61	22	44.43	22	83.18
23	Hong Seung-a	119.46	23	42.80	23	76.66
WD	Ji Seo-yeon	withdrew	withdrew from competition			
WD	Park Yeon-jeong	withdrew	withdrew from competition			

=== Senior pairs ===
Rank	Name	Total points	SP		FS	
1	Cho Hye-jin / Steven Adcock	157.30	1	52.64	1	104.66

== Junior results ==
=== Junior men ===
Rank	Name	Total points	SP		FS	
1	Choi Ha-bin	214.64	1	71.83	1	142.81
2	Park Hyun-seo	146.39	2	51.84	2	94.55
3	Kim Ye-sung	120.93	3	43.39	3	77.54
4	Kim Aaron	116.70	4	40.11	4	76.59
5	Choi Ye-chang	104.79	5	36.84	5	67.95
6	Choi Ye-hwang	94.12	6	30.65	6	63.47

=== Junior women ===
Rank	Name	Total points	SP		FS	
1	Kim Yu-seong	177.07	1	59.35	1	117.72
2	Lee Ji-yoon	151.00	2	52.80	2	98.20
3	Kim Ye-eun	147.65	5	49.70	3	97.95
4	Lee Eun	146.35	4	49.94	4	96.41
5	Jun Ji-woo	145.69	3	51.52	5	94.17
6	Lee Hyo-rin	140.62	6	49.44	6	91.18
7	Park In-kyong	133.58	7	47.03	9	86.55
8	Hwang Jeong-youl	133.10	9	42.62	7	90.48
9	Hyun Ye-lyn	130.96	10	41.92	8	89.04
10	Yu Na-yeong	125.50	12	41.58	10	83.92
11	Kim Yui	121.63	11	41.61	11	80.02
12	Jun Yeon-sue	118.91	8	42.74	12	76.17
13	Park Hyun-a	116.74	13	41.10	13	75.64
14	Lim Chae-ryeong	115.67	14	40.81	14	74.86
15	Park Seo-hyun	110.39	15	39.14	17	71.25
16	Hwang Ji-young	109.97	16	38.63	16	71.34
17	Park Si-eun	107.21	22	35.62	15	71.59
18	Lee Rae-in	103.69	17	37.55	19	66.14
19	Kim Chan	101.98	18	37.33	20	64.65
20	Cho Chae-yoon	101.27	24	34.52	18	66.75
21	Ryu Hee-won	99.93	21	35.85	21	64.08
22	Kim Hye-seo	99.82	19	36.09	22	63.73
23	Kim Ga-hyeon	96.45	20	36.09	23	60.36
24	Baek Kumg-yung	92.18	23	35.46	24	56.72
Did not advance to free skating
25	Yu In-seo	33.78	25	33.78	—N/a	
26	Park Do-hyeon	33.56	26	33.56	—N/a	
27	Park Ha-ram	33.34	27	33.34	—N/a	
28	Park Min-seo	32.07	28	32.07	—N/a	
29	Yeon Chae-ju	31.31	29	31.31	—N/a	
30	Kim Min-jae	30.76	30	30.76	—N/a	
31	Kwon Su-min	30.33	31	30.33	—N/a	
32	Seo Chae-eun	30.07	32	30.07	—N/a	
33	Jung Su-bin	29.87	33	29.87	—N/a	
34	Lee Ha-yul	29.50	34	29.50	—N/a	
35	Lee Min-ju	19.59	34	19.59	—N/a	
WD	Lee Bo-seul	withdrew	withdrew from competition			
WD	Lee Yu-na	withdrew	withdrew from competition			
WD	Kim So-hee	withdrew	withdrew from competition			
WD	Lee Seun-gone	withdrew	withdrew from competition			
WD	Park Che-a	withdrew	withdrew from competition			

=== Junior ice dance ===
Rank	Name	Total points	RD		FD	
1	Hannah Lim / Ye Quan	169.45	1	67.12	1	102.33
2	Kim Jinny / Lee Na-mu	125.59	2	49.64	2	75.95

== International team selections ==
=== Winter Universiade ===
The 2023 Winter Universiade was held in Lake Placid, United States from January 13–16, 2023.

	Men	Women	Ice dance
1	Lee Si-hyeong	Kim Ye-lim	
2	Cha Young-hyun	Choi Da-bin	
1st alt.	Kyeong Jae-seok	Lee Si-won	

=== Four Continents Championships ===
The 2023 Four Continents Championships was held in Colorado Springs, United States from February 7–12, 2023.

	Men	Women	Pairs	Ice dance
1	Cha Jun-hwan	Kim Chae-yeon		
2	Kyeong Jae-seok	Lee Hae-in		
3	Lee Si-hyeong	Kim Ye-lim		
1st alt.	Kim Hyun-gyeom	Wi Seo-yeong		
2nd alt.	Cha Young-hyun	Yun Ah-sun		
3rd alt.	Kim Han-gil	You Young		

=== World Junior Championships ===
Commonly referred to as "Junior Worlds", the 2023 World Junior Championships was held in Calgary, Canada from February 27 – March 5, 2023.

	Men	Women	Pairs	Ice dance
1	Kim Hyun-gyeom	Shin Ji-a		Hannah Lim / Ye Quan
2		Kwon Min-sol		Kim Jinny / Lee Na-mu
3		Kim Yu-jae		
1st alt.	Seo Min-kyu	Yun Seo-jin		
2nd alt.	Cha Young-hyun	Yun Ah-sun		
3rd alt.	Lee Jae-keun	Wi Seo-yeong		

=== World Championships ===
The 2023 World Championships was held in Saitama, Japan from March 20–26, 2023.

	Men	Women	Pairs	Ice dance
1	Cha Jun-hwan	Kim Ye-lim		
2		Lee Hae-in		
3		Kim Chae-yeon		
1st alt.	Kim Hyun-gyeom	Yun Ah-sun		
2nd alt.	Lee Si-hyeong	Wi Seo-yeong		
3rd alt.	Kyeong Jae-seok	You Young		
