= Cho Hye-jin (figure skater) =

Canadian-South Korean pair skater (born 2005)

Personal information
- Native name: 조혜진
- Other names: Cho Hye-jin
- Born: November 30, 2005 (age 20) Edmonton, Alberta, Canada
- Home town: Toronto, Ontario, Canada
- Height: 1.52 m (5 ft 0 in)

Figure skating career
- Country: South Korea
- Coach: Andrew Evans, Alexander Sheldrik-Male, Dmitri Savin
- Skating club: Canadian Ice Academy
Medal record
Figure skating: Pairs
Representing South Korea
World Team Trophy
Silver medal – second place	2023 Tokyo	Team

Cho Hye-jin (Korean: 조혜진; born November 30, 2005) is a Canadian-South Korean pair skater who represents South Korea. With her former skating partner, Steven Adcock, she is the 2023 South Korean champion.

== Career ==
=== 2022–23 season ===
In September 2022, coach Andrew Evans announced Steven Adcock and Cho as a new pair team for South Korea.

Cho and Adcock debuted at the 2023 South Korean Championships and won, as they were the only pair team. After South Korea qualified to the 2023 World Team Trophy, the first time the nation had reached the event in its history, Cho/Adcock were named to the team as the pairs entry. They finished sixth in both segments of the competition, while Team South Korea won the silver medal. This made Korea only the fifth country to reach the podium at the event. Adcock said that the team's priority over the summer was working to add a second triple throw to their free program.

Cho and Adcock ended their partnership two weeks later after 2023 World Team Trophy due to Adcock electing to retire as a result of a longtime back injury.

=== Partnership with Windsor ===
In July 2023, it was announced that Cho had teamed up with Australian pair skater, Harley Windsor and that they would be representing South Korea together. However, the partnership would ultimately dissolve in October.

== Programs ==
=== With Adcock ===
Season	Short program	Free skating	Exhibition
2022–2023	Nero by Nick Phoenix choreo. by Mary Angela Larmer	Piano Concerto No. 2 by Sergei Rachmaninoff choreo. by Pavol Poráč	Nero by Nick Phoenix choreo. by Mary Angela Larmer

== Competitive highlights ==
=== With Adcock for South Korea ===
National
Event	2022–23
South Korean Champ.	1st
Team events
World Team Trophy	2nd T 6th P
T = Team Result; P = Personal result. Medals awarded for team result only.

=== Women's singles ===
National
Event	18–19	19–20	21–22
Canadian Champ.		7th N	
Skate Canada Challenge	17th P	9th N	29th J
Alberta Sectionals	4th P	1st N	3rd J
TBD = Assigned; WD = Withdrew; Levels: P= Pre-Novice; N = Novice; J = Junior

== Detailed results ==
Current personal best scores are highlighted in bold.

=== With Adcock ===
**2022–23 season**
Date	Event	SP	FS	Total
April 13–16, 2023	2023 World Team Trophy	6; **60.55**	6; **102.27**	2T / 6P; **162.82**
January 5–8, 2023	2023 South Korean Championships	1; 52.64	1; 104.66	1; 157.30
