= ISU World Team Trophy in Figure Skating =

Figure skating team competition

The ISU World Team Trophy in Figure Skating is a figure skating team competition sanctioned by the International Skating Union. The World Team Trophy was held for the first time in Tokyo, Japan, from April 16 to 19, 2009. Traditionally, the competitive skating season had concluded with the World Championships.

The new event was announced at a news conference during the 2008 World Championships, in the hope of encouraging countries to develop top figure skaters in all disciplines. Each country sends two men, two women, one pair, and one ice dance entry.

== Competition and participants ==
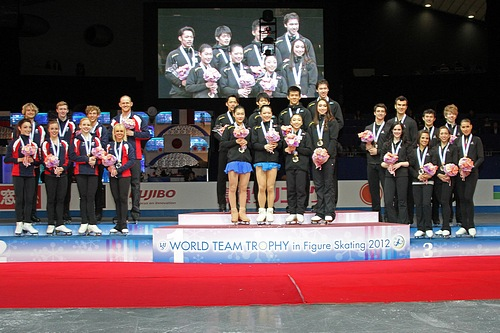
The medal ceremony at the 2012 World Team Trophy.

Selected skaters from the six countries with the best results during the season compete in the disciplines of men's singles, women's singles, pair skating, and ice dance in a team format. The participating countries in the inaugural event were (in descending order of finish) the United States, Canada, Japan, France, Russia, and China. The Japan Skating Federation paid the global prize money for the ISU World Team Trophy in 2009. The total prize money in 2009 was US$1,000,000, the highest ever in an ISU event, with $200,000 awarded to the winning country. In 2015, the qualifying countries (in descending order of qualification) were Russia, the United States, Japan, Canada, France, and China, with the United States taking the title. Prize money was once again US$1,000,000.

== Reactions ==
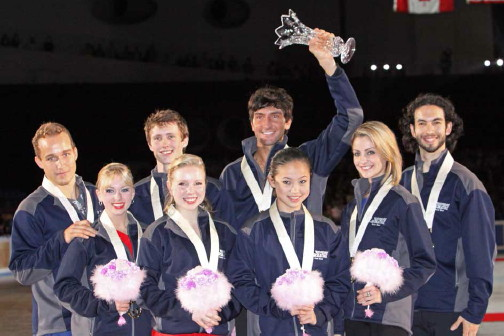
Team USA at the 2009 World Team Trophy medal ceremony.

In 2009, there were reports that some of the participating skaters did not wish to take part in the event. Canadian ice dancer Scott Moir was quoted as saying that although the event was fun, skaters had been pressured to attend. U.S. ice dancer Tanith Belbin told an interviewer that she and partner Benjamin Agosto had not been aware of the event until after the 2009 World Championships. Evan Lysacek, who had won the World Championship shortly before the World Team Trophy, was quoted in the same article as saying he was excited and looking forward to competing in Japan as part of the American team, referring to the event as "icing on the cake".

In 2012, skaters expressed more enthusiasm about competing at the World Team Trophy. Daisuke Takahashi referred to the competition as "a lot of fun", while Scott Moir said it was turning into an exciting event, especially considering a team event would be contested at the 2014 Winter Olympics. The fact that this event is held after all major competitions forced many athletes to not attend in order to not risk injuries or fatigue after a long season. The event is also not in a similar format as the Olympics: ice dance and pairs events only count as two events each and individual competitions for four events, thus favoring teams and nations who are not well fulfilled in ice dance and pairs events. The lowest ranked ice dancers and pairs are also awarded 7 points, marginalizing the point difference toward the winners who are awarded only five more points for a maximum of twelve points.

== Results ==
ISU World Team Trophy - Results
Year	Location	Gold	Silver	Bronze
2009	(Japan) Tokyo	United States; Jeremy Abbott; Evan Lysacek; Rachael Flatt; Caroline Zhang; Caydee Denney / Jeremy Barrett; Tanith Belbin / Benjamin Agosto	Canada; Patrick Chan; Vaughn Chipeur; Cynthia Phaneuf; Joannie Rochette; Jessica Dubé / Bryce Davison; Tessa Virtue / Scott Moir	Japan; Takahiko Kozuka; Nobunari Oda; Miki Ando; Mao Asada; Narumi Takahashi / Mervin Tran; Cathy Reed / Chris Reed
2011	Event cancelled due to the Tōhoku earthquake and tsunami			
2012	(Japan) Tokyo	Japan; Takahiko Kozuka; Daisuke Takahashi; Kanako Murakami; Akiko Suzuki; Narumi Takahashi / Mervin Tran; Cathy Reed / Chris Reed	United States; Jeremy Abbott; Adam Rippon; Gracie Gold; Ashley Wagner; Caydee Denney / John Coughlin; Meryl Davis / Charlie White	Canada; Patrick Chan; Kevin Reynolds; Amélie Lacoste; Cynthia Phaneuf; Meagan Duhamel / Eric Radford; Tessa Virtue / Scott Moir
2013	(Japan) Tokyo	United States; Max Aaron; Jeremy Abbott; Gracie Gold; Ashley Wagner; Marissa Castelli / Simon Shnapir; Madison Chock / Evan Bates	Canada; Patrick Chan; Kevin Reynolds; Gabrielle Daleman; Kaetlyn Osmond; Meagan Duhamel / Eric Radford; Kaitlyn Weaver / Andrew Poje	Japan; Takahito Mura; Daisuke Takahashi; Mao Asada; Akiko Suzuki (no pairs team); Cathy Reed / Chris Reed
2015	(Japan) Tokyo	United States; Max Aaron; Jason Brown; Gracie Gold; Ashley Wagner; Alexa Scimeca / Chris Knierim; Madison Chock / Evan Bates	Russia; Maxim Kovtun; Sergei Voronov; Elena Radionova; Elizaveta Tuktamysheva; Yuko Kavaguti / Alexander Smirnov; Elena Ilinykh / Ruslan Zhiganshin	Japan; Yuzuru Hanyu; Takahito Mura; Satoko Miyahara; Kanako Murakami; Ami Koga / Francis Boudreau-Audet; Cathy Reed / Chris Reed
2017	(Japan) Tokyo	Japan; Yuzuru Hanyu; Shoma Uno; Wakaba Higuchi; Mai Mihara; Sumire Suto / Francis Boudreau-Audet; Kana Muramoto / Chris Reed	Russia; Mikhail Kolyada; Maxim Kovtun; Evgenia Medvedeva; Elena Radionova; Evgenia Tarasova / Vladimir Morozov; Ekaterina Bobrova / Dmitri Soloviev	United States; Jason Brown; Nathan Chen; Karen Chen; Ashley Wagner; Ashley Cain / Timothy LeDuc; Madison Chock / Evan Bates
2019	(Japan) Fukuoka	United States; Nathan Chen; Vincent Zhou; Mariah Bell; Bradie Tennell; Ashley Cain / Timothy LeDuc; Madison Hubbell / Zachary Donohue	Japan; Keiji Tanaka; Shoma Uno; Rika Kihira; Kaori Sakamoto; Riku Miura / Shoya Ichihashi; Misato Komatsubara / Tim Koleto	Russia; Andrei Lazukin; Alexander Samarin; Sofia Samodurova; Elizaveta Tuktamysheva; Natalia Zabiiako / Alexander Enbert; Victoria Sinitsina / Nikita Katsalapov
2021	(Japan) Osaka	Russia; Mikhail Kolyada; Evgeni Semenenko; Anna Shcherbakova; Elizaveta Tuktamysheva; Anastasia Mishina / Aleksandr Galliamov; Victoria Sinitsina / Nikita Katsalapov	United States; Jason Brown; Nathan Chen; Karen Chen; Bradie Tennell; Alexa Knierim / Brandon Frazier; Kaitlin Hawayek / Jean-Luc Baker	Japan; Yuzuru Hanyu; Shoma Uno; Rika Kihira; Kaori Sakamoto; Riku Miura / Ryuichi Kihara; Misato Komatsubara / Tim Koleto
2023	(Japan) Tokyo	United States; Jason Brown; Ilia Malinin; Amber Glenn; Isabeau Levito; Alexa Knierim / Brandon Frazier; Madison Chock / Evan Bates	South Korea; Cha Jun-hwan; Lee Si-hyeong; Kim Ye-lim; Lee Hae-in; Cho Hye-jin / Steven Adcock; Hannah Lim / Ye Quan	Japan; Shun Sato; Kazuki Tomono; Mai Mihara; Kaori Sakamoto; Riku Miura / Ryuichi Kihara; Kana Muramoto / Daisuke Takahashi
2025	(Japan) Tokyo	United States; Jason Brown; Ilia Malinin; Amber Glenn; Alysa Liu; Alisa Efimova / Misha Mitrofanov; Madison Chock / Evan Bates	Japan; Yuma Kagiyama; Shun Sato; Mone Chiba; Kaori Sakamoto; Riku Miura / Ryuichi Kihara; Utana Yoshida / Masaya Morita	Italy; Daniel Grassl; Nikolaj Memola; Lara Naki Gutmann; Anna Pezzetta; Sara Conti / Niccolò Macii; Charlène Guignard / Marco Fabbri

== Medal table ==
Rank	Nation	Gold	Silver	Bronze	Total
1	United States	6	2	1	9
2	Japan	2	2	5	9
3	Russia	1	2	1	4
4	Canada	0	2	1	3
5	South Korea	0	1	0	1
6	Italy	0	0	1	1
Totals (6 entries)		9	9	9	27

== Participating nations ==
Participating nations
Team	2009	2012	2013	2015	2017	2019	2021	2023	2025	Total
Canada	2nd	3rd	2nd	4th	4th	5th	6th	6th	5th	9
China	6th	–	5th	5th	5th	–	–	–	–	4
France	4th	4th	6th	6th	6th	4th	5th	5th	4th	9
Georgia	–	–	–	–	–	–	–	–	6th	1
Italy	–	6th	–	–	–	6th	4th	4th	3rd	5
Japan	3rd	1st	3rd	3rd	1st	2nd	3rd	3rd	2nd	9
Russia	5th	5th	4th	2nd	2nd	3rd	1st	–	–	7
South Korea	–	–	–	–	–	–	–	2nd	–	1
United States	1st	2nd	1st	1st	3rd	1st	2nd	1st	1st	9
