= Ye Quan =

Canadian and South Korean ice dancer (born 2001)

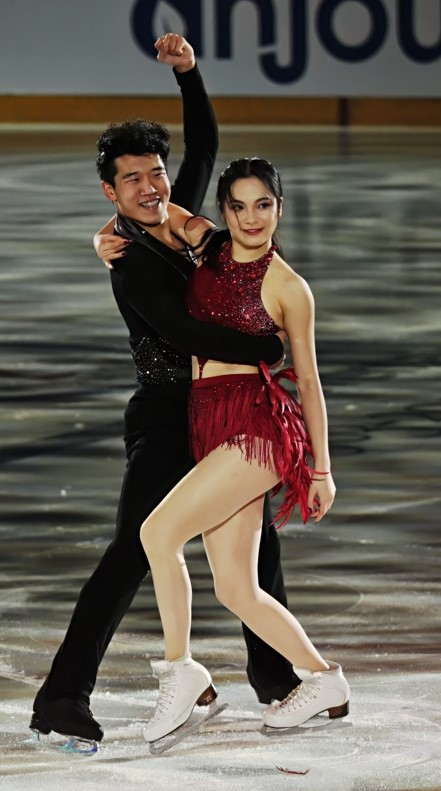
- Lim/Quan during their exhibition program at the 2023 Grand Prix de France

Personal information
- Other names: Kwon Ye
- Born: October 15, 2001 (age 25) Reykjavík, Iceland
- Home town: Montreal, Quebec, Canada
- Height: 1.70 m (5 ft 7 in)

Figure skating career
- Country: South Korea (since 2021); Canada (until 2021)
- Discipline: Ice dance
- Partner: Hannah Kim (since 2026); Hannah Lim (2019–26)
- Coach: Benjamin Brisebois; Marie-France Dubreuil; Patrice Lauzon
- Skating club: CPA Ahuntsic

Medal record
Representing South Korea
South Korean Championships
Gold medal – first place	2024 Uijeongbu	Ice dance
Gold medal – first place	2025 Uijeongbu	Ice dance
Gold medal – first place	2026 Seoul	Ice dance
World Team Trophy
Silver medal – second place	2023 Tokyo	Team
World Junior Championships
Silver medal – second place	2023 Calgary	Ice dance
Junior Grand Prix Final
Silver medal – second place	2022–23 Turin	Ice dance

Ye Quan (Korean: 콴예; born October 15, 2001) is a Canadian ice dancer who has represented South Korea since 2021. With his former skating partner, Hannah Lim, he is a four-time ISU Challenger Series medalist and a three-time South Korean national champion (2024, 2025, 2026). Lim/Quan represented South Korea at the 2026 Winter Olympics.

At the junior level, Lim/Quan are the 2023 World Junior silver medalists, the 2022–23 Junior Grand Prix Final silver medalists, three-time ISU Junior Grand Prix medalists, and two-time South Korean Junior champions (2022-23).

Lim and Quan are the first South Korean ice dancers to win an ISU Grand Prix medal at either the senior or junior level.

== Personal life ==
Quan was born on October 15, 2001, in Reykjavík, Iceland, and lived in the town of Bolungarvík, where his mother worked, for his first two years. He moved to China at the age of two and moved again to Montreal, Canada at the age of three. Both of his parents now live in Canada. Quan is able to speak English, French, Chinese, and Korean.

He received South Korean citizenship on December 6, 2024.

== Career ==
=== Early years ===
Quan began learning how to skate at around age five, first training in singles and later switching to ice dance.

Quan first partnered with Maïka Abgrall-Chouinard and competed at the pre-novice level for two years. He teamed up with Rosalie Groulx in 2017 and competed at the novice level, placing fourteenth at the 2018 Canadian Championships and eleventh at the 2019 Canadian Championships.

=== Partnership with Hannah Lim ===
==== Formation of partnership ====
In the summer of 2019, Quan partnered with Hannah Lim. They were admitted to the Ice Academy of Montreal, a prestigious training school headed by Canadian coaches Marie-France Dubreuil and Patrice Lauzon and Frenchman Romain Haguenauer. The team competed domestically in Canada for two seasons, before opting to switch to represent South Korea internationally. Lim called the move "a 'thank you' gift" to her parents for their support of her skating career, while Quan said "I was happy to represent South Korea with her."

==== 2021–22 season: International junior debut ====
Lim and Quan made their Junior Grand Prix debut for South Korea at the 2021 JGP France I, the first of two Junior Grand Prix events held in Courchevel, France in August. The team placed fourth in the rhythm dance but overtook Czechs Mrázková/Mrázek in the free dance to finish third overall, standing on the podium with American gold medalists Wolfkostin/Chen and their former Canadian domestic rivals Makita/Gunara. Lim and Quan's bronze medal was the first medal for an ice dance team representing South Korea at an ISU Grand Prix series event at either the junior or senior levels. At their second assignment, the 2021 JGP Russia, Lim and Quan placed fifth in the rhythm dance and sixth in the free dance to finish sixth overall.

The team next competed at the 2022 South Korean Junior Championships in January, where they won the junior national title by a 52-point margin over Kim/Lee. As a result of their placement, they were named to the South Korean team for the 2022 World Junior Championships in Tallinn.

At the World Junior Championships, Lim and Quan were seventh in the rhythm dance but rose to fourth in the free dance to improve their overall standing to sixth place. Their finish matched Kim/Minov's placement in 2014 as the highest finish for a South Korean ice dance team at a World Junior Championships.

==== 2022–23 season: JGP Final and Junior World silver ====
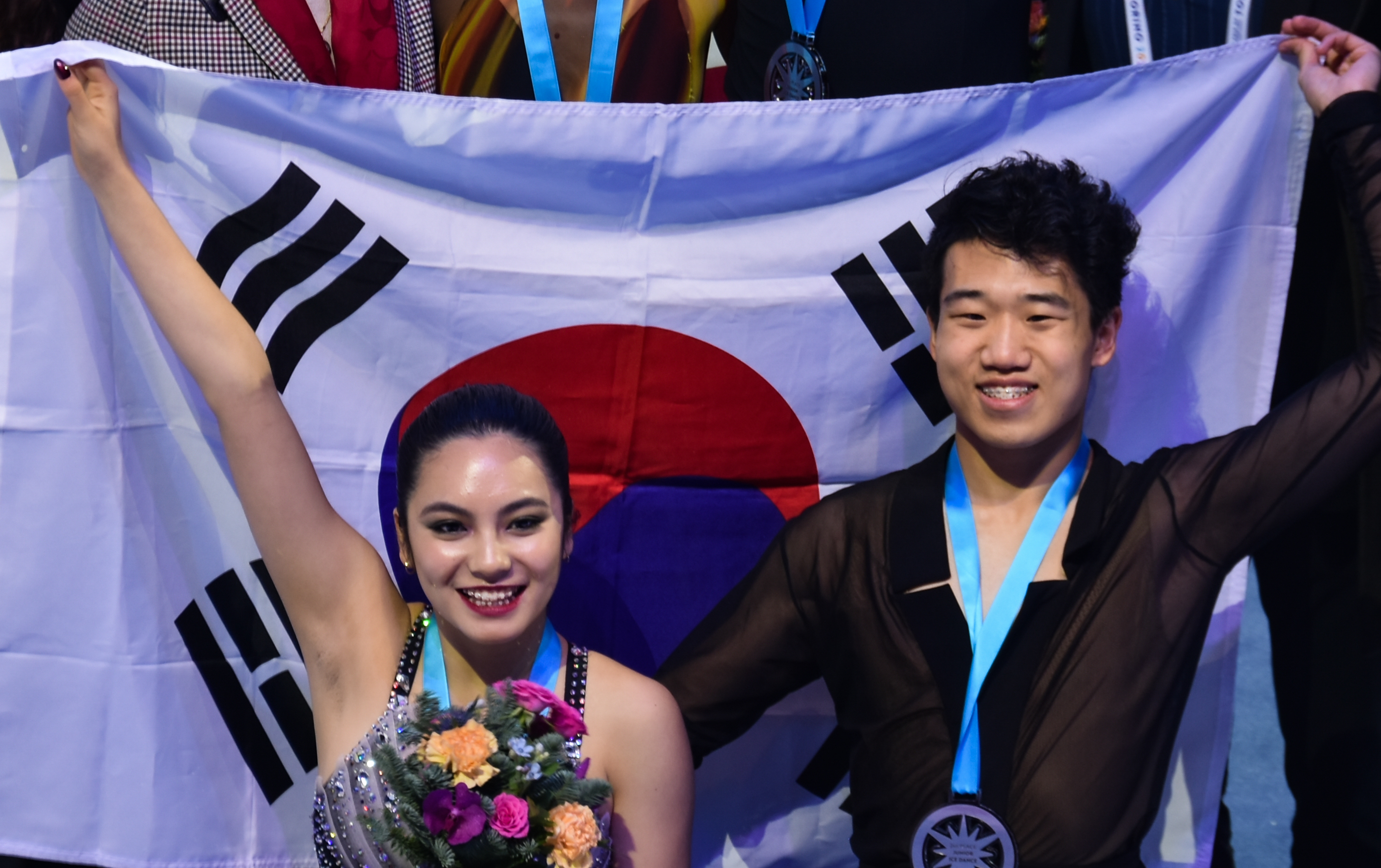
Lim and Quan on the podium at the 2022–23 Junior Grand Prix Final

Lim and Quan opened the Junior Grand Prix series at a Courchevel-held French JGP for the second year in a row. They placed first in both the rhythm dance and the free dance, as well as setting new personal bests in both segments of the competition, to win the gold medal with a new personal best overall. Their win marked the first Junior Grand Prix event title for any South Korean or Asian ice dance team. A month and a half later they competed at their second event, the 2022 JGP Italy in Egna. They finished fourth in the rhythm dance after scoring poorly on their step sequence and part of the Argentine tango pattern dance, but recovered with a second-place free dance and won the silver medal behind Mrázková/Mrázek, the Czech dance team they had beaten for their first JGP medal a year earlier. These results qualified them for the 2022–23 Junior Grand Prix Final, another first for a Korean dance team.

At the Final in Turin, Lim and Quan finished third in the rhythm dance with a score of 64.21. They were only 0.37 points behind Britons Bekker/Hernandez in second place, but also only 0.13 ahead of fourth-place Mrázková/Mrázek, who had been the pre-event favourites before having a double-fall in the segment. In the free dance they rose to second, aided again by a double-fall from the Czechs, who finished 0.99 points behind them overall. Their silver was the first Final medal for a Korean dance team."

Lim and Quan won their second consecutive South Korean junior title at the 2023 Junior National Championships, again by a wide margin. They were assigned to finish the season at the 2023 World Junior Championships in Calgary, entering as podium favourites. They finished second in the rhythm dance with a new personal best score of 71.08, only 0.11 behind segment leaders Mrázková/Mrázek and more than two points clear of Bekker/Hernandez in third. They set a new personal best in the free dance as well with 103.31, clearing the 100-point threshold for the first time, and won the silver medal. This was the first Junior World medal for a South Korean team. Lim said she was "really glad that we were able to get a first medal for Korea."

Based on the total results of skaters in the 2022–23 season, South Korea qualified for the World Team Trophy for the first time, with the 2023 edition being held in Tokyo. With South Korea not having any dance teams already competing at the senior level that season, Lim/Quan were assigned to make their senior debut, which meant replacing their rhythm dance immediately after the World Junior Championships. They created a new program to "Don't Go Yet" and "Havana" by Camila Cabello. They finished sixth of six teams in the rhythm dance. Quan lost a twizzle level in the free dance, but they set new personal bests in that segment and overall. Lim enthused about performing in front of a senior event audience in Japan. Team South Korea won the silver medal, becoming the fifth country to reach the podium in the history of the World Team Trophy.

==== 2023–24 season: Senior debut ====
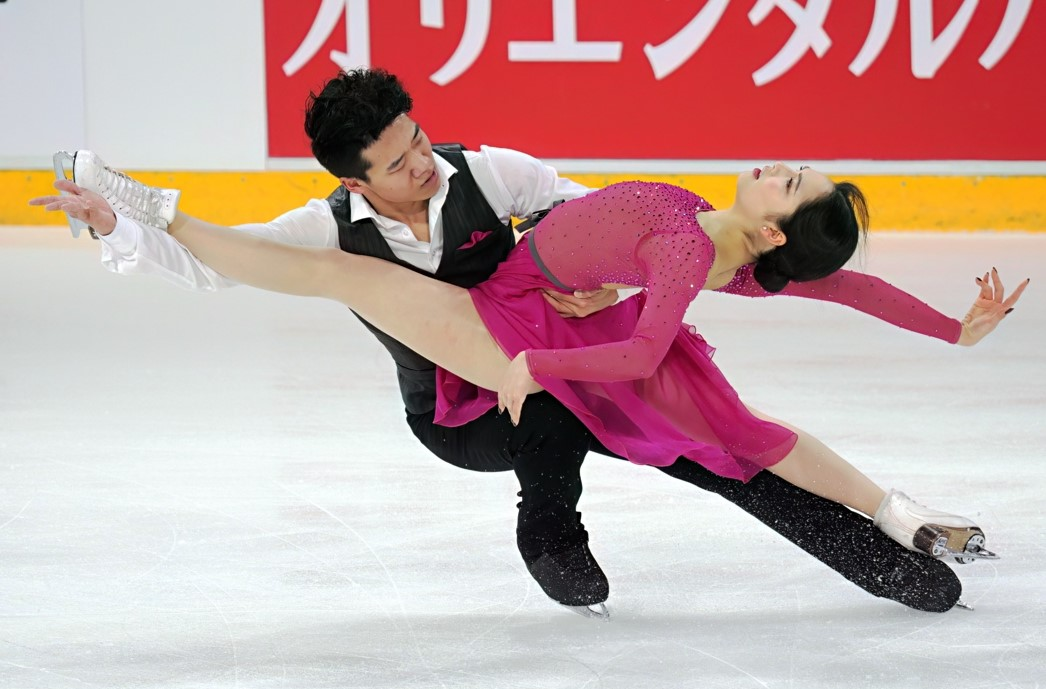
Lim/Quan performing a curve lift during their free dance at the 2023 Grand Prix de France

For their full senior debut, Lim stated their goal was to "be memorable." Lim/Quan received their first Challenger assignment, competing at the 2023 CS Autumn Classic International and winning the bronze medal.

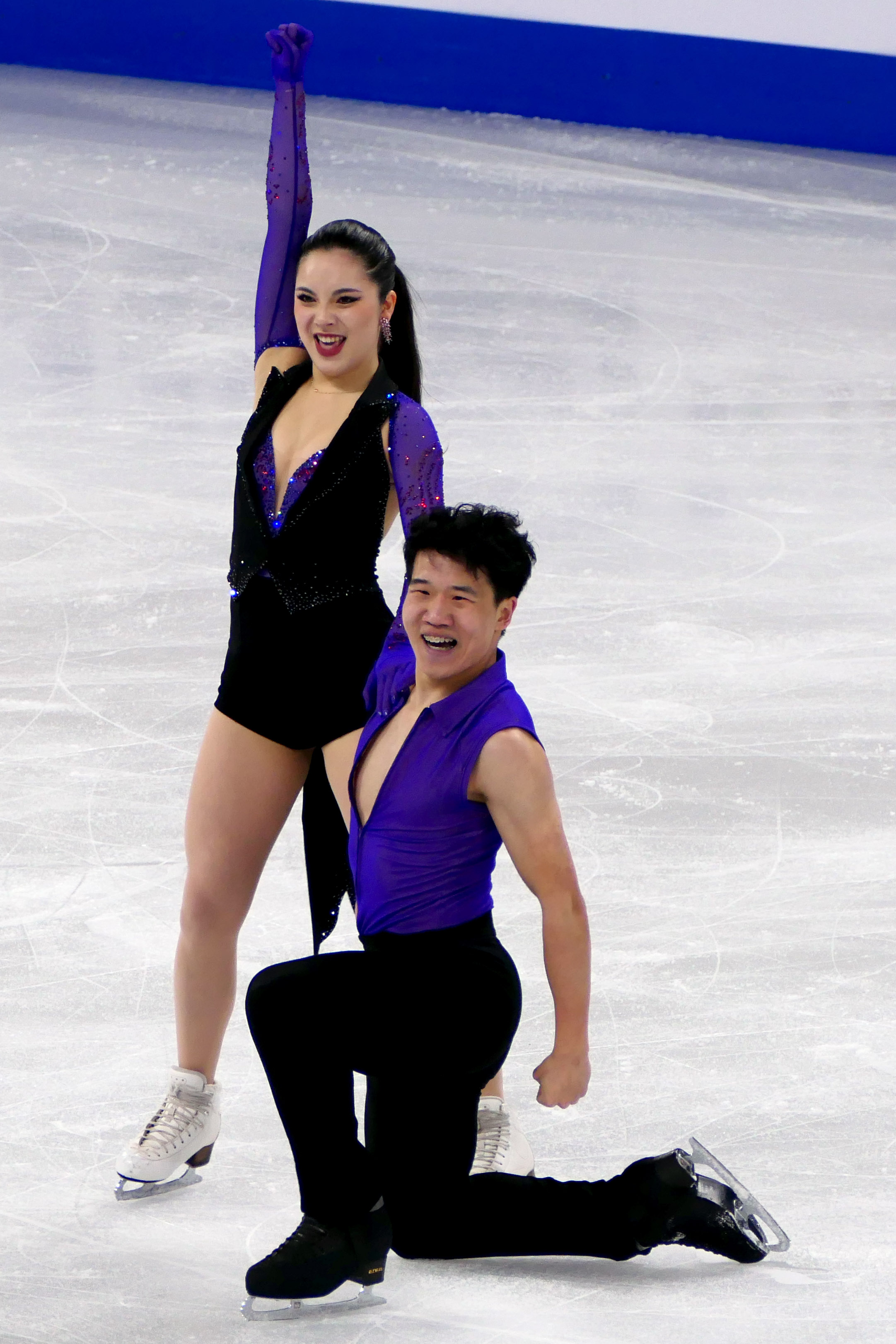
Lim and Quan performing their rhythm dance at the 2024 World Championships

They made their Grand Prix debut at the 2023 Skate America, finishing ninth of ten teams. They improved their ordinals at their second event, the 2023 Grand Prix de France, where they eighth in the rhythm dance and rose to sixth after the free dance. Quan assessed that "the performance level that we wanted to reach was achieved" in France. They then appeared at a second Challenger, winning the silver medal at the 2023 CS Warsaw Cup.

Competing at the domestic senior level for the first time at the 2024 South Korean Championships, Lim/Quan won the senior national title. They went on to make their senior ISU championship debut at the 2024 Four Continents Championships in Shanghai, finishing seventh.

Lim/Quan made their senior World Championship debut at the 2024 edition, held in Montreal, the site of their training base. They finished fourteenth in the rhythm dance, Lim saying afterward she was "really happy" with the result. Twelfth in the free dance, they remained fourteenth overall. Afterward, Lim called the championships "surely one to remember."

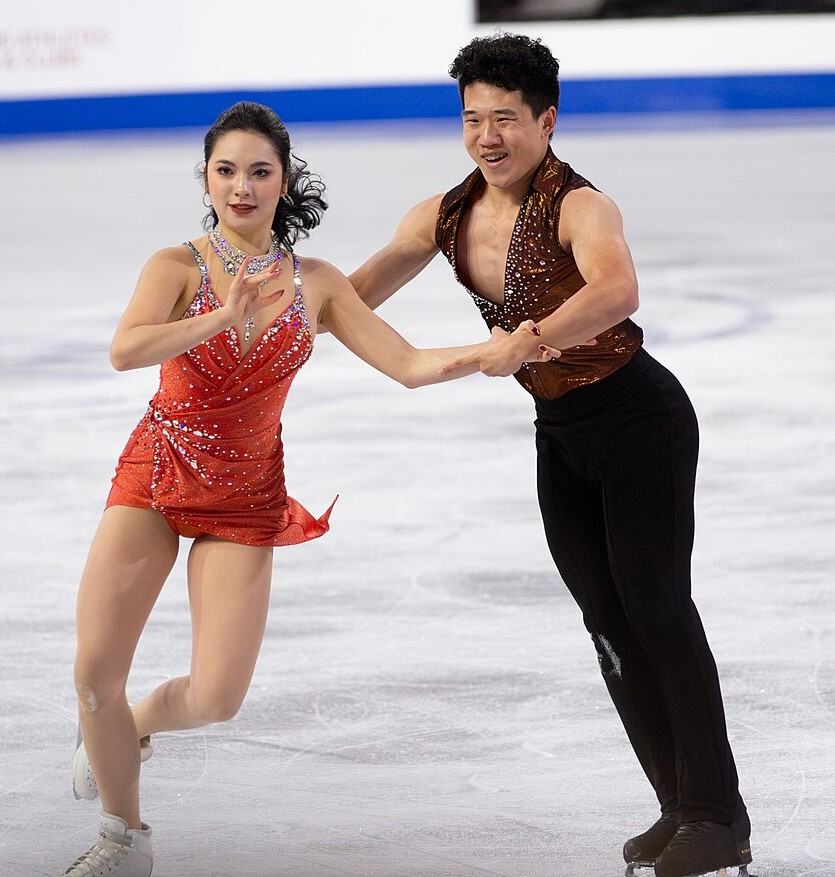
Lim & Quan performing their rhythm dance at 2024 Skate Canada International

==== 2024–25 season ====
Lim/Quan began the season by competing at the 2024 CS Denis Ten Memorial Challenge, where they finished fifth. Although they were also assigned to compete at the 2024 CS Budapest Trophy, the team had to withdraw from the event due to a scheduling conflict with a South Korean domestic event.

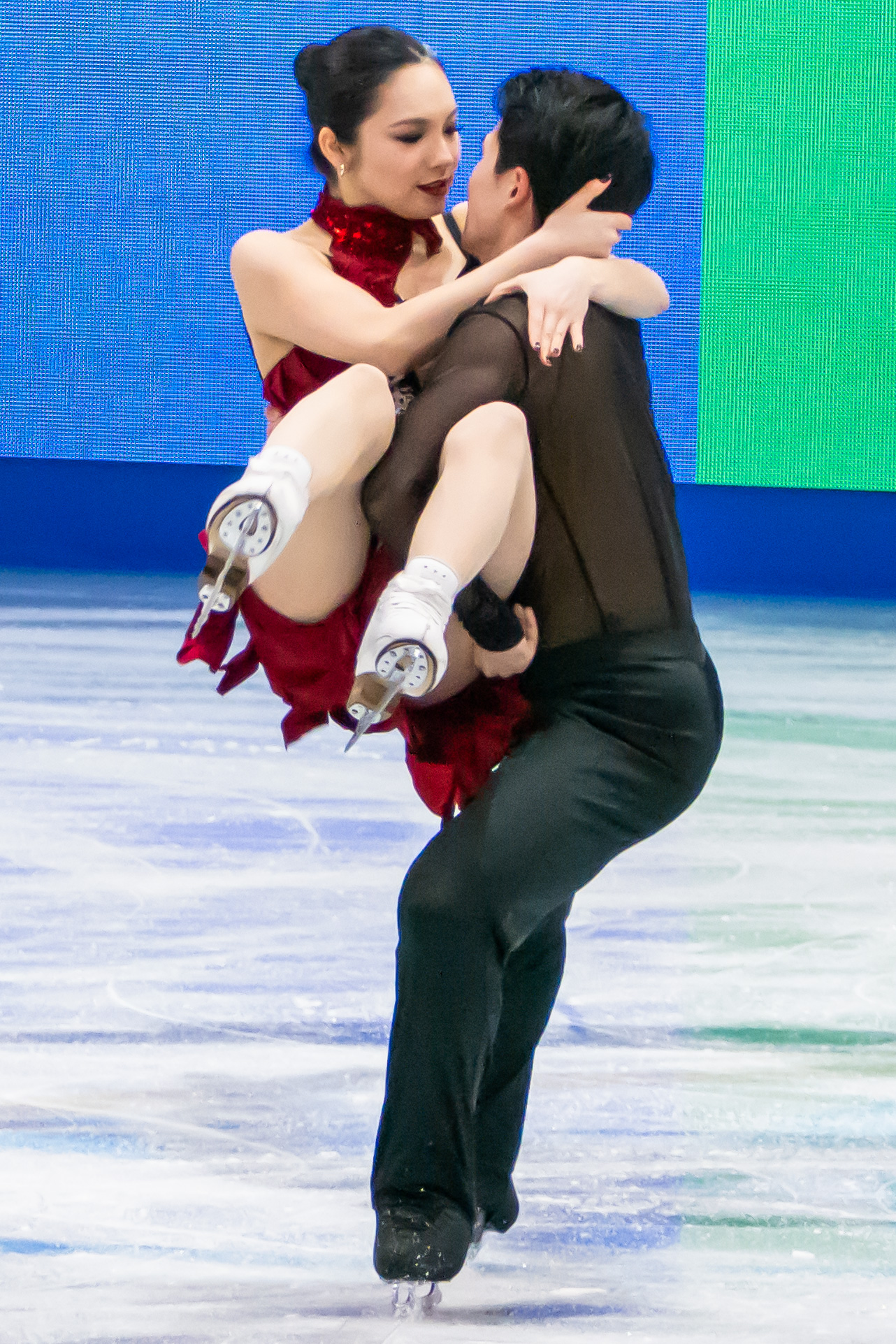
Lim and Quan performing their free dance at the 2025 World Championships

Going on to compete on the 2024–25 Grand Prix circuit, they placed seventh at 2024 Skate Canada International and ninth at the 2024 Finlandia Trophy. At the end of November, Lim and Quan won the bronze medal at the 2024 CS Warsaw Cup before winning gold at the annual South Korean Ranking Competition one week later. Due to the latter result, Lim and Quan were selected to compete at the 2025 Four Continents Championships. One month later, the duo won their second consecutive title at the 2025 South Korean Championships, earning a spot on the 2025 Worlds team.

In February, they placed sixth at the 2025 Four Continents Championships in Seoul, South Korea and went on to place eighteenth at the 2025 World Championships in Boston, Massachusetts, United States, the following month.

==== 2025–26 season: Milano Cortina Olympics ====
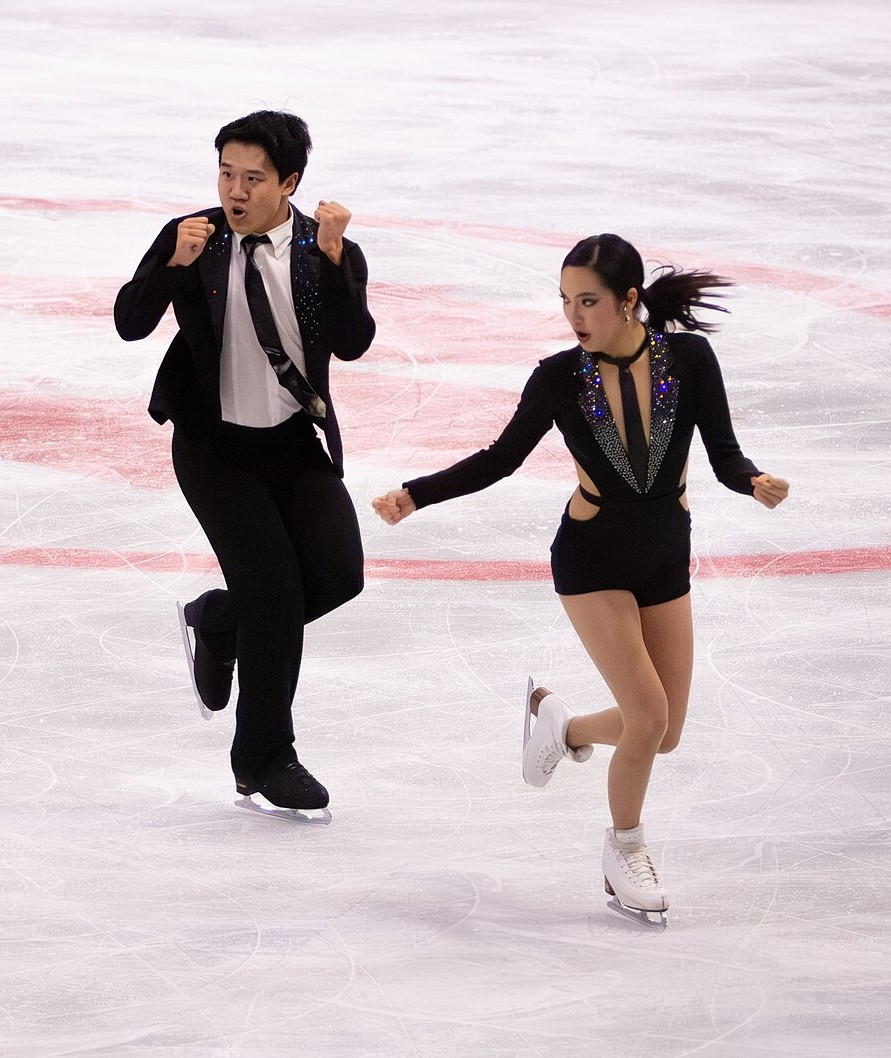
Lim and Quan performing their rhythm dance at the 2025 Skate Canada International

Lim/Quan started the season by winning the bronze medal at the 2025 Lake Placid Ice Dance International and went on to place fourth 2025 CS Kinoshita Group Cup. They finished fifth at the 2025 Cup of China and were "thrilled" to learn that they had been assigned to 2025 Skate Canada. "We were actually a bit more nervous today than in our previous competitions, but we're very happy with our skate and with the scores," said Lim after the free dance. "Also, the levels were pretty good, so we're quite pleased with that." They followed this up by winning silver at the 2025 CS Warsaw Cup.

In January, Lim/Quan won their third consecutive national title at the 2026 South Korean Figure Skating Championships. Following the event, they were named to the 2026 Winter Olympic team.

The following month, Lim/Quan placed sixth at the 2026 Four Continents Championships. "We felt really good," said Lim after the free dance. "I think I was a little nervous today, but we kept the story and the connection. We know that we made a little bit of mistakes, so we can work hard to do a better score and better performance at the Olympics."

On 6 February, Lim/Quan competed in the rhythm dance segment for Team South Korea during the 2026 Winter Olympics Figure Skating Team Event, placing seventh. Three days later, Lim/Quan competed in the rhythm dance segment of the individual ice dance event. During the performance, Quan made a costly error during their twizzle sequence and as a result, they placed twenty-second and failed to advance to the free dance segment. "I don’t know..." pondered Quan following their disappointing performance. "Maybe it was just the nerves. I’m a bit disappointed about what happened, actually pretty disappointed. But overall, for the rest of the program, I think I still did my best. At least I’m proud that it didn’t affect the rest of the skate."

The following month, Lim/Quan competed at the 2026 World Championships in Prague, Czech Republic. The team placed nineteenth in the rhythm dance and fourteenth in the free dance to finish in fifteenth place overall.

In April, Lim/Quan announced the end of their partnership and stated they would be searching for new partners.

=== Partnership with Hannah Kim ===
==== 2026–27 season ====
In July 2026, Quan announced via his Instagram that he had teamed up with American solo ice dancer Hannah Kim, and that they would represent South Korea whilst training at the Ice Academy of Montreal.

== Programs ==
=== Ice dance with Hannah Lim ===
Season	Rhythm dance	Free dance	Exhibition
2025–26	Men in Black; Pump Me Up; Gettin' Jiggy wit It by Will Smith choreo. by Samuel Chouinard	Adagio for Strings by Samuel Barber; Adagio by Lara Fabian performed by Laura Bretan choreo. by Marie-France Dubreuil	Goddess by Laufey
2024–25	I Got You (I Feel Good) by James Brown and the Famous Flames; Something's Got a Hold on Me by Etta James; Dance to the Music by Sly and the Family Stone choreo. by Romain Haguenauer; Reach Out I'll Be There by Gloria Gaynor; I Will Survive by Gloria Gaynor performed by Hermes House Band choreo. by Romain Haguenauer	Cruella; Goodbye, Estella by Nicholas Britell; Call Me Cruella by Florence and the Machine; The Baroque Ball; Surveillance by Nicholas Britell choreo. by Marie-France Dubreuil	Apt. by Rosé & Bruno Mars
2023–24	Let's Go Crazy; When Doves Cry by Prince choreo. by Romain Haguenauer	The Umbrellas of Cherbourg by Michel Legrand; Umbrellas of Cherbourg performed by Peter Breiner & Peter Breiner Symphonic Pop Orchestra; Les Parapluies de Cherbourg performed by Mario Pelchat choreo. by Marie-France Dubreuil, Samuel Chouinard	Gangnam Style by Psy; Don't Give It to Me by Hwasa & Loco
2022–23	Samba: Don't Go Yet; Rhumba: Havana by Camila Cabello choreo. by Romain Haguenauer; Primavera porteña by Astor Piazzolla choreo. by Romain Haguenauer	Danse Macabre by Camille Saint-Saëns choreo. by Marie-France Dubreuil	Gangnam Style by Psy; Don't Give It to Me by Hwasa & Loco
2021–22	Gangnam Style by Psy; Don't Give It to Me by Hwasa & Loco	Jellicle Songs for Jellicle Cats; Memory performed by Jennifer Hudson (from Cats) by Andrew Lloyd Webber & T. S. Eliot	Butter by BTS
2020–21	Overture by Andrew Lippa; Just Around the Corner performed by Bebe Neuwirth; Main Title by Hummie Mann	Jellicle Songs for Jellicle Cats; Memory performed by Jennifer Hudson (from Cats) by Andrew Lloyd Webber & T. S. Eliot	
2019–20	Overture by Andrew Lippa; Just Around the Corner performed by Bebe Neuwirth; Main Title by Hummie Mann	The Nutcracker and the Four Realms; The Nutcracker and the Four Realms; Clara's New World; The Machine Room Fight by James Newton Howard	

== Competitive highlights ==
- GP – Event of the ISU Grand Prix Series
- JGP – Event of the ISU Junior Grand Prix Series
- CS – Event of the ISU Challenger Series
- TBD – Assigned
- WD – Withdrew from competition
- Medals at team events are awarded for the team results only. Individual placements at team events are listed in parentheses.

=== Ice dance with Hannah Kim (for South Korea) ===
Competition placements at senior level
Season	2025–26
Mezzaluna Cup	5th

=== Ice dance with Hannah Lim (for South Korea) ===
Competition placements at senior level
Season	2022–23	2023–24	2024–25	2025–26
Winter Olympics				22nd
Winter Olympics (Team event)				7th
World Championships		14th	18th	15th
Four Continents Championships		7th	6th	6th
South Korean Championships		1st	1st	
World Team Trophy	2nd (6th)			
GP Cup of China				5th
GP Finland			9th	
GP France		6th		
GP Skate America		9th		
GP Skate Canada			7th	6th
CS Autumn Classic		3rd		
CS Denis Ten Memorial			5th	
CS Kinoshita Group Cup				4th
CS Warsaw Cup		2nd	3rd	2nd
Lake Placid ID				3rd

Competition placements at junior level
Season	2021–22	2022–23
World Junior Championships	6th	2nd
Junior Grand Prix Final		2nd
South Korean Championships	1st	1st
JGP France	3rd	1st
JGP Italy		2nd
JGP Russia	6th	

=== Ice dance with Hannah Lim (for Canada) ===
Competition placements at junior level
Season	2019–20	2020–21
Canadian Championships	5th	
Skate Canada Challenge	9th	4th

== Detailed results ==
=== Ice dance with Hannah Lim (for South Korea) ===
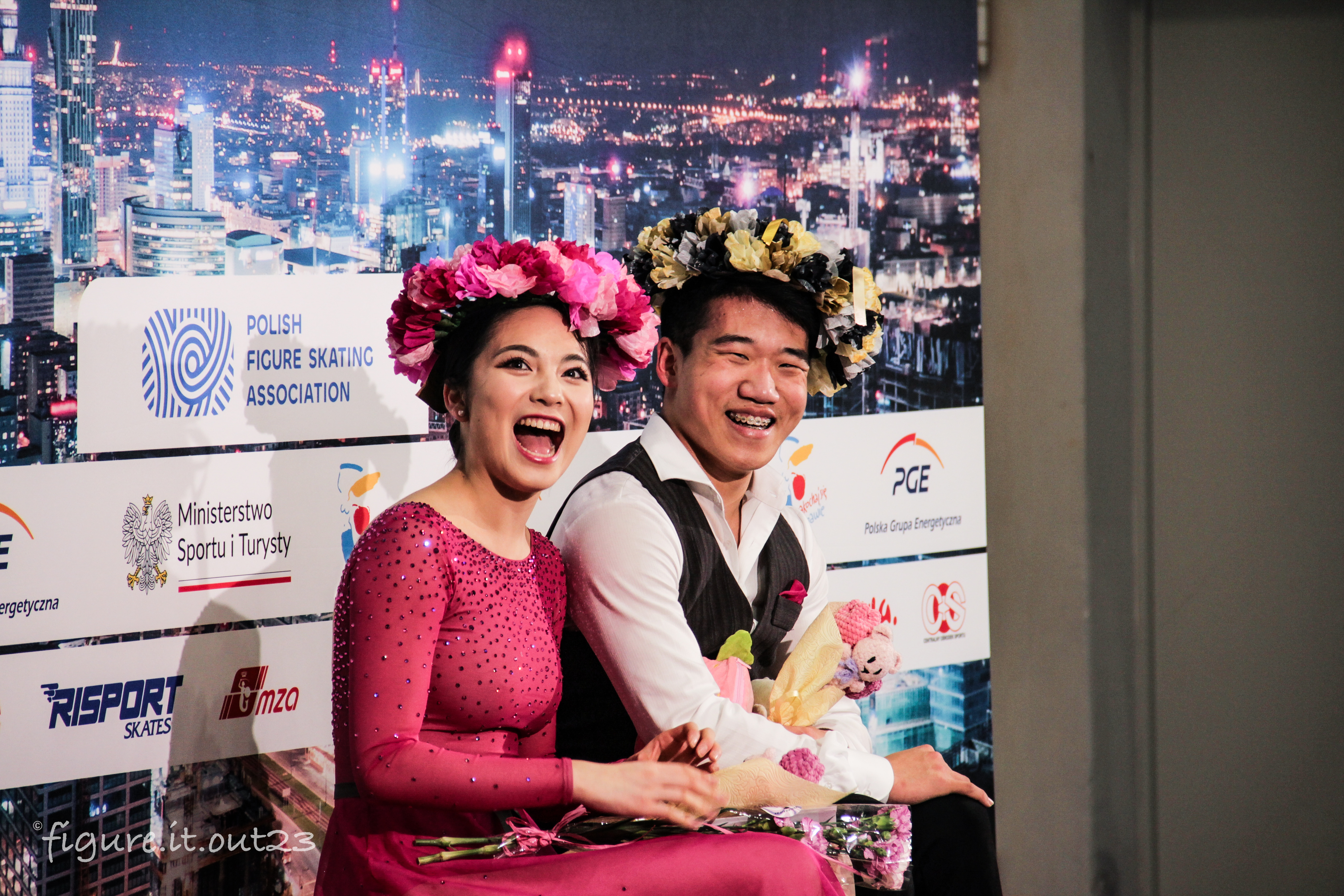
Lim and Quan at the 2023 Warsaw Cup

ISU personal best scores in the +5/-5 GOE System
Segment	Type	Score	Event
Total	TSS	190.26	2025 CS Warsaw Cup
Rhythm dance	TSS	76.02	2025 CS Warsaw Cup
Rhythm dance	TES	43.57	2025 CS Warsaw Cup
Rhythm dance	PCS	32.45	2025 CS Warsaw Cup
Free dance	TSS	114.62	2024 World Championships
Free dance	TES	65.64	2025 CS Warsaw Cup
Free dance	PCS	49.72	2024 World Championships

- Small medals for the short program and free skating are only awarded at ISU Championships.
- Medals at team events are awarded for the team results only. Individual placements at team events are listed in parentheses.

==== Senior level ====
Results in the 2022–23 season
Date	Event	RD		FD		Total	
Date	Event	P	Score	P	Score	P	Score
Apr 13–16, 2023	(Japan) 2023 World Team Trophy	6	69.96	6	109.27	2 (6)	179.23

Results in the 2023–24 season
Date	Event	RD		FD		Total	
Date	Event	P	Score	P	Score	P	Score
Sep 14–17, 2023	(Canada) 2023 CS Autumn Classic International	4	68.05	3	102.65	3	170.70
Oct 20–22, 2023	(United States) 2023 Skate America	9	65.49	8	103.62	9	169.11
Nov 3–5, 2023	2023 Grand Prix de France	8	67.14	6	106.71	6	173.85
Nov 15–17, 2023	(Poland) 2023 CS Warsaw Cup	2	73.76	2	113.34	2	187.10
Jan 4–7, 2024	(South Korea) 2024 South Korean Championships	1	70.41	1	115.88	1	186.29
Jan 30 – Feb 4, 2024	(China) 2024 Four Continents Championships	9	68.91	7	113.87	7	182.78
Mar 18–24, 2024	(Canada) 2024 World Championships	14	71.89	12	114.62	14	186.51

Results in the 2024–25 season
Date	Event	RD		FD		Total	
Date	Event	P	Score	P	Score	P	Score
Oct 3–6, 2024	(Kazakhstan) 2024 CS Denis Ten Memorial Challenge	5	69.91	6	107.38	5	177.29
Oct 25–27, 2024	2024 Skate Canada International	8	70.64	7	106.45	7	177.09
Nov 15–17, 2024	(Finland) 2024 Finlandia Trophy	9	69.00	8	106.36	9	175.36
Nov 20–24, 2024	(Poland) 2024 CS Warsaw Cup	4	74.11	3	111.51	3	185.62
Jan 2–5, 2025	(South Korea) 2025 South Korean Championships	1	68.62	1	106.38	1	175.00
Feb 19–23, 2025	(South Korea) 2025 Four Continents Championships	6	72.37	6	111.65	6	184.02
Mar 25–30, 2025	(United States) 2025 World Championships	16	72.04	18	105.27	18	174.78

Results in the 2025–26 season
Date	Event	RD		FD		Total	
Date	Event	P	Score	P	Score	P	Score
Jul 27–31, 2025	(United States) 2025 Lake Placid Ice Dance International	3	71.71	3	108.85	3	180.56
Sep 5–7, 2025	(Japan) 2025 CS Kinoshita Group Cup	4	66.99	4	105.17	4	172.16
Oct 24–26, 2025	2025 Cup of China	5	73.68	5	112.11	5	185.79
Oct 31 – Nov 2, 2025	2025 Skate Canada International	6	70.97	5	109.44	6	180.41
Nov 19–23, 2025	(Poland) 2025 CS Warsaw Cup	3	76.02	3	114.24	2	190.26
Jan 3–6, 2026	(South Korea) 2026 South Korean Championships	1	77.47	1	110.82	1	188.29
Jan 21–25, 2026	(China) 2026 Four Continents Championships	7	66.05	4	110.92	6	176.97
Feb 6–8, 2026	(Italy) 2026 Winter Olympics – Team event	7	70.55	—N/a	—N/a	7	—N/a
Feb 17–19, 2026	(Italy) 2026 Winter Olympics	22	64.69	—N/a	—N/a	22	64.69
Mar 24–29, 2026	(Czech Republic) 2026 World Championships	19	69.83	14	108.99	15	178.82

==== Junior level ====
Results in the 2021–22 season
Date	Event	RD		FD		Total	
Date	Event	P	Score	P	Score	P	Score
Aug 18–21, 2021	2021 JGP France	4	55.22	3	89.05	3	144.27
Sep 15–18, 2021	2021 JGP Russia	5	59.87	6	93.14	6	153.01
Jan 7–9, 2022	(South Korea) 2022 South Korean Championships (Junior)	1	64.48	1	91.52	1	156.00
Apr 13–17, 2022	(Estonia) 2022 World Junior Championships	7	58.82	4	95.62	6	154.44

Results in the 2022–23 season
Date	Event	RD		FD		Total	
Date	Event	P	Score	P	Score	P	Score
Aug 24–27, 2022	2022 JGP France	1	62.71	1	99.25	1	161.96
Oct 12–15, 2022	2022 JGP Italy	4	59.01	2	99.24	2	158.25
Dec 8–11, 2022	(Italy) 2022–23 Junior Grand Prix Final	3	64.21	2	98.32	2	162.53
Jan 5–8, 2023	(South Korea) 2023 South Korean Championships (Junior)	1	67.12	1	102.33	1	169.45
Feb 27 – Mar 5, 2023	(Canada) 2023 World Junior Championships	2	71.08	2	103.31	2	174.39
