= Tian Tonghe =

Chinese figure skater

Personal information
- Native name: 田桐赫
- Full name: Tian Tonghe
- Born: 6 August 2008 (age 17) Changchun, Jilin, China
- Home town: Changchun
- Height: 1.67 m (5 ft 5 1/2 in)

Figure skating career
- Country: China
- Discipline: Men's singles
- Coach: Xu Binshu
- Began skating: 2012

Tian Tonghe (Chinese: 田桐赫; pinyin: Tián Tónghè; born 6 August 2008) is a Chinese figure skater. He is the 2023–24 Chinese National Junior champion, the 2024 Junior Grand Prix China silver medalist, and the 2024 Junior Grand Prix Thailand bronze medalist.

== Personal life ==
Tian was born on August 6, 2008 in Changchun, China. As a hobby, he enjoys playing basketball.

His figure skating idol is Yuzuru Hanyu.

== Career ==
=== Early career ===
Tian began figure skating in 2012. He made his national debut at the 2019–20 Chinese Championships, where he finished fourth on the senior level. That same year, he won gold on the advanced novice level at the 2019 Asian Open Trophy.

=== 2022–23 season ===
Tian debuted on Junior Grand Prix circuit, finishing tenth at 2022 JGP Czech Republic, where he finished tenth.

=== 2023–24 season ===
Competing on the 2023–24 ISU Junior Grand Prix circuit, Tian finished fourth at 2023 JGP Austria. He went on to win gold at the 2024 Chinese Junior Championships and silver on the junior level at the 14th Chinese Winter Games.

Selected to compete at the 2024 Winter Youth Olympics in Gwacheon, South Korea, Tian finished eighth in the men's individual event and third in the team event, helping Team China finish fourth overall.

=== 2024–25 season ===
Tian began the season by competing on the Junior Grand Prix series, winning bronze at the 2024 JGP Thailand and taking silver at the 2024 JGP China. With these results, Tian was named as the second alternate for the 2024–25 Junior Grand Prix Final.

In late February, Tian competed at the 2025 World Junior Championships in Debrecen, Hungary, where he finished in fifteenth place.

=== 2025–26 season ===
Tian opened the season by competing in the women's singles discipline on the 2025–26 ISU Junior Grand Prix series, finishing fourth at 2025 JGP Italy and ninth at 2025 JGP United Arab Emirates.

== Programs ==
Season	Short program	Free skating
2025–2026	Mauvaise journée by Stromae choreo. by Xu Binshu	Pray (High Valyrian) (from Game of Thrones) by Ramin Djawadi choreo. by Xu Binshu
2024–2025	Warriors by Too Many Zooz choreo. by Liu Yazhuo	Hungarian Rhapsody No.2 in C-sharp minor by Franz Liszt choreo. by Liu Yazhuo
2023–2024	Ylang Ylang by French Kiwi Juice choreo. by Xu Binshu	1st Movement (from Grand Piano) by Víctor Reyes choreo. by Xu Binshu
2022–2023	Suite for Jazz Orchestra No. 1 – I. Waltz by Dmitri Shostakovich choreo. by Xu Binshu	An American in Paris by George Gershwin choreo. by Xu Binshu

== Competitive highlights ==
- JGP – Event of the ISU Junior Grand Prix Series
- TBD – Assigned

Competition placements at senior level
Season	2019–20
Chinese Championships	4th

Competition placements at junior level
Season	2022–23	2023–24	2024–25	2025–26
Winter Youth Olympics		8th		
Winter Youth Olympics (Team event)		4th		
World Junior Championships			15th	
Chinese Championships		1st		2nd
JGP Austria		4th		
JGP China			2nd	
JGP Czech Republic	10th			
JGP Italy				4th
JGP Thailand			3rd	
JGP United Arab Emirates				9th
National Winter Games		2nd		

== Detailed results ==
ISU personal best scores in the +5/-5 GOE System
Segment	Type	Score	Event
Total	TSS	210.39	2024 JGP Thailand
Short program	TSS	70.78	2024 JGP Thailand
Short program	TES	36.46	2024 JGP China
Short program	PCS	34.54	2024 JGP Thailand
Free skating	TSS	139.61	2024 JGP Thailand
Free skating	TES	68.34	2024 JGP Thailand
Free skating	PCS	71.36	2024 JGP China

=== Junior level ===
2025–26 season
Date	Event	Level	SP	FS	Total
October 8–11, 2025	2025 JGP United Arab Emirates	Junior	8; 66.69	10; 117.91	9; 184.60
September 3–6, 2025	2025 JGP Italy	Junior	7; 68.34	4; 131.41	4; 199.75
2024–25 season
Date	Event	Level	SP	FS	Total
February 25–March 2, 2025	2025 World Junior Championships	Junior	11; 72.46	17; 120.93	15; 193.39
October 9–12, 2024	2024 JGP China	Junior	4; 69.33	2; 138.62	2; 207.95
September 11–14, 2024	2024 JGP Thailand	Junior	4; 70.78	3; 139.61	3; 210.39
2023–24 season
Date	Event	Level	SP	FS	Total
February 1, 2024	2024 Winter Youth Olympics (Team)	Junior	–	3; 125.12	4T/3P; 125.12
January 26–February 2, 2024	2024 Winter Youth Olympics	Junior	5; 67.08	11; 112.24	8; 179.32
January 17–19, 2024	14th Chinese Winter Games	Junior	2; 61.58	2; 116.72	2; 178.30
November 24–26, 2023	2023 Chinese Junior Championships	Junior	1; 73.93	1; 140.14	1; 214.07
August 30–September 2, 2023	2023 JGP Austria	Junior	6; 66.12	5; 134.86	4; 200.98
2022–23 season
Date	Event	Level	SP	FS	Total
Augugust 31–September 3, 2022	2022 JGP Czech Republic	Junior	10; 59.12	11; 107.44	10; 166.56
2019–20 season
September 14–16, 2019	2020 Chinese Championships	Senior	4; 61.15	4; 124.56	4; 185.71
