= Jacob Sanchez =

American figure skater (born 2007)

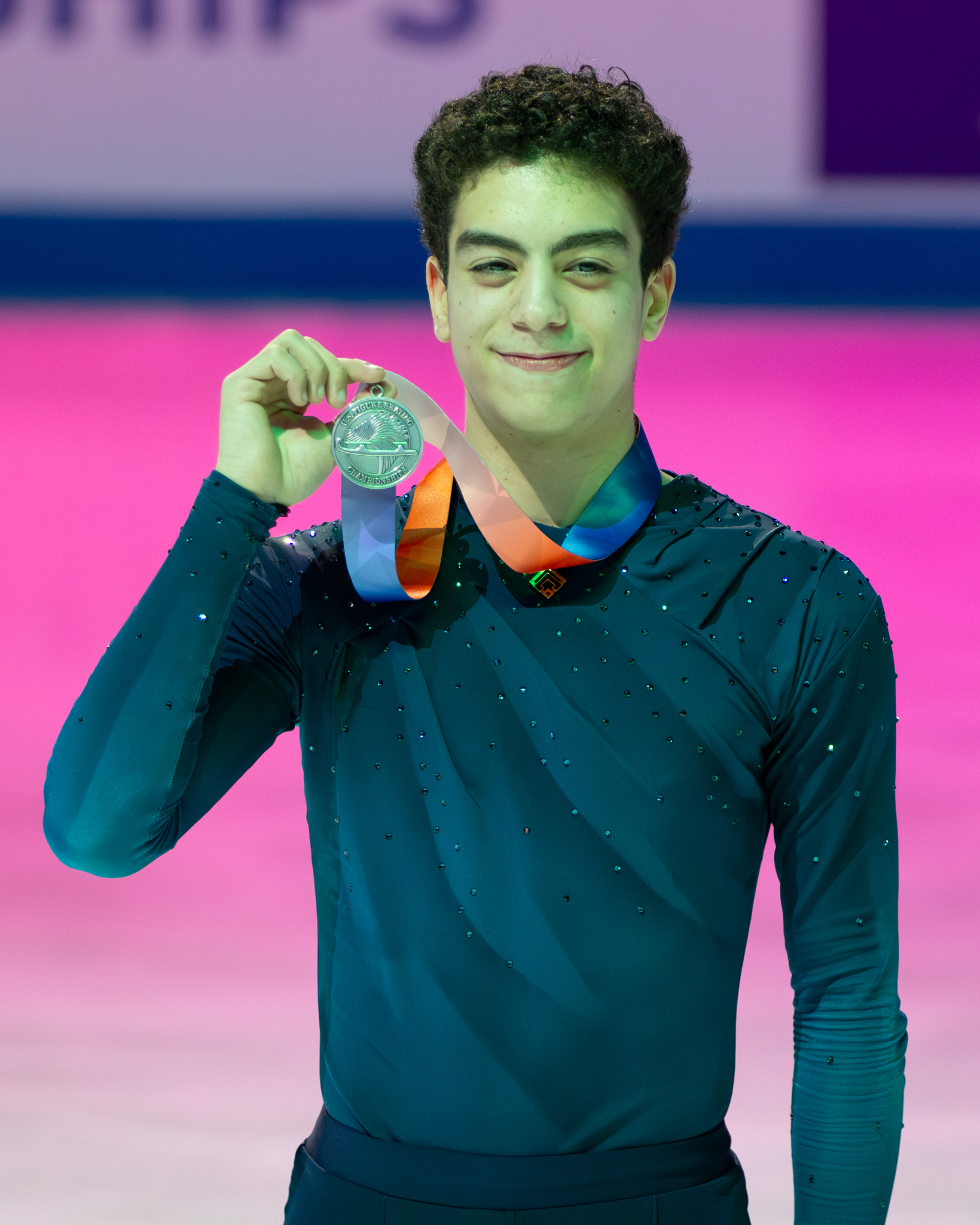
- Sanchez at the 2026 U.S. Championships

Personal information
- Born: April 23, 2007 (age 19) Middletown, New York, U.S.
- Home town: Montgomery, New York, U.S.
- Height: 5 ft 7 in (1.70 m)

Figure skating career
- Country: United States
- Discipline: Men's singles
- Coach: Oleg Makarov; Larisa Selezneva
- Skating club: Hudson Valley Figure Skating Club
- Began skating: 2012

Medal record
Winter Youth Olympics
Silver medal – second place	2024 Gangwon	Team
Junior Grand Prix Final
Gold medal – first place	2024–25 Grenoble	Singles

Jacob Sanchez (born April 23, 2007) is an American figure skater. He is the 2024 CS Tallinn Trophy champion and the 2026 U.S. National pewter medalist.

At the junior level, he is the 2024 Youth Olympic silver medalist in the team event, the 2024–25 Junior Grand Prix Final champion, the 2024 JGP Turkey and the 2024 JGP Slovenia gold medalist, the 2023 U.S. Junior silver medalist, and the 2021 U.S. Junior pewter medalist.

== Personal life ==
Sanchez was born on April 23, 2007 in Middletown, New York to parents, Johana, a school teacher, and Jose, a retired police officer. He also has two brothers, Joseph and Jayden.

Sanchez serves as an ambassador of Diversify Ice, an organization that strives to support competitive figure skaters from minority groups. During the Figure skating at the 2024 Winter Youth Olympics, close friend and fellow competitor, Rio Nakata, gifted Sanchez with a necklace which he began regularly wearing to competitions, describing it as a "good luck charm." In addition to figure skating, he also enjoys playing hockey, football, and soccer.

His figure skating idols are Yuzuru Hanyu, Nathan Chen, Vincent Zhou, Jason Brown, and Ilia Malinin.

Sanchez has expressed interest in becoming a physical therapist after completing his competitive figure skating career.

== Career ==
=== Early career ===
Sanchez began figure skating in 2012 at the age of five. He originally wanted to be a hockey player so his mother enrolled him into "Learn to Skate" lessons. However, he was unable to use hockey skates so he tried using figure skates instead. He ultimately decided that he enjoyed the feeling of balancing and gliding across the ice in those skates. Following this, he began watching figure skaters compete on TV and ultimately decided that he wanted to pursue the sport. He then began training under 1984 Olympic pair bronze medalists, Larisa Selezneva and Oleg Makarov at the Hudson Valley Figure Skating Club.

Sanchez won the silver medal at the 2018 U.S. Juvenile Championships before going on to win bronze at the 2019 U.S. Intermediate Championships.

Moving up to the junior level the following year, Sanchez finished seventeenth at the 2020 U.S. Junior Championships and went on to win the pewter medal at the 2021 U.S. Junior Championships.

=== Junior career ===
==== 2021–22 season: Junior international debut ====
Sanchez started the season by the bronze medal on the junior level at the 2021 Cranberry Cup International. In addition, he debuted on the Junior Grand Prix circuit, finishing sixth at 2021 JGP Poland.

In January, Sanchez competed at the 2022 U.S. Junior Championships, coming in ninth.

==== 2022–23 season: U.S. Junior national silver medal ====
In August, Sanchez competed on the junior level at the 2022 Cranberry Cup International, Sanchez won the silver medal. Three months later, he competed as a junior at the 2023 U.S. Eastern Sectionals, finishing fourth.

Qualifying for the 2023 U.S. Junior Championships, Sanchez won the silver medal behind Lucas Broussard. He then ended the season by taking gold on the junior level at the 2023 Coupe du Printemps.

==== 2023–24 season: Youth Olympics team silver ====
Selected to compete on the 2023–24 ISU Junior Grand Prix circuit, Sanchez finished fourth at 2023 JGP Thailand and fifth at 2023 JGP Hungary.

Sanchez was then named to the 2024 Winter Youth Olympic team. In the men's singles individual event, Sanchez won the short program but placed sixth in the free skate, dropping to fourth overall. In the team event, Sanchez helped Team U.S.A. take silver by placing second in his segment.

Competing at the 2024 World Junior Championships in Taipei, Taiwan, Sanchez placed ninth in the short program and fifteenth in the free skate, finishing tenth overall.

==== 2024–25 season: Junior Grand Prix Final gold ====
Sanchez started the season by on the junior level at the 2022 Cranberry Cup International, where finished second behind New Zealand skater, Yanhao Li.

Competing on the 2024–25 ISU Junior Grand Prix series, Sanchez won gold at 2024 JGP Turkey. Prior to his victory he had no second assignment on the series, but was assigned to 2024 JGP Slovenia following his gold medal win. In Slovenia, Sanchez managed to win a second gold medal. With these results, he qualified for the 2024–25 Junior Grand Prix Final as the highest ranking junior man. At that event, Sanchez placed second in the short program with a score of 79.24, only 0.15 points behind leader, Rio Nakata. In the free skate, Sanchez would deliver a strong performance, less than a point below his personal best and second in the segment behind Seo Min-kyu. However, with an overall score 227.38, Sanchez earned enough to win the gold medal overall. Following the event, Sanchez said, "I have so many emotions right now. If you would have asked me at the beginning of the season that I would go to the JGP final and medal I wouldn’t have believed it. Also the last week and a half was pretty rough. I was quite sick last week and also had some problems with my lower back but I didn’t let that get to me. The skates weren’t perfect but I pushed through." He also credited fellow competitor and close friend, Rio Nakata for helping him through the competition, saying, "It’s been great to be on this whole trip together with Rio, have him by my side and also see him again after quite a long time."

Selected to compete at the 2025 World Junior Championships in Debrecen, Hungary, Sanchez placed third in the short program and fifth in the free skate, finishing in fourth place overall, only 3 points off the podium. In an interview following the event, he said, "Yeah, it’s a bit unfortunate. I was so close. I actually felt very confident today. I think I did the two triple Axels at the beginning the best I’ve ever done in competition... But I still think I had a really good season, and I’m happy with it."

=== Senior career ===
==== 2024–25 season: Senior international debut ====
In mid-November, Sanchez made his senior international debut at the 2024 Tallinn Trophy, where he won the gold medal. Debuting on the national senior level at the 2025 U.S. Championships in Wichita, Kansas, Sanchez finished the event in seventh place after placing sixth in both the short and free program segments.

==== 2025–26 season ====
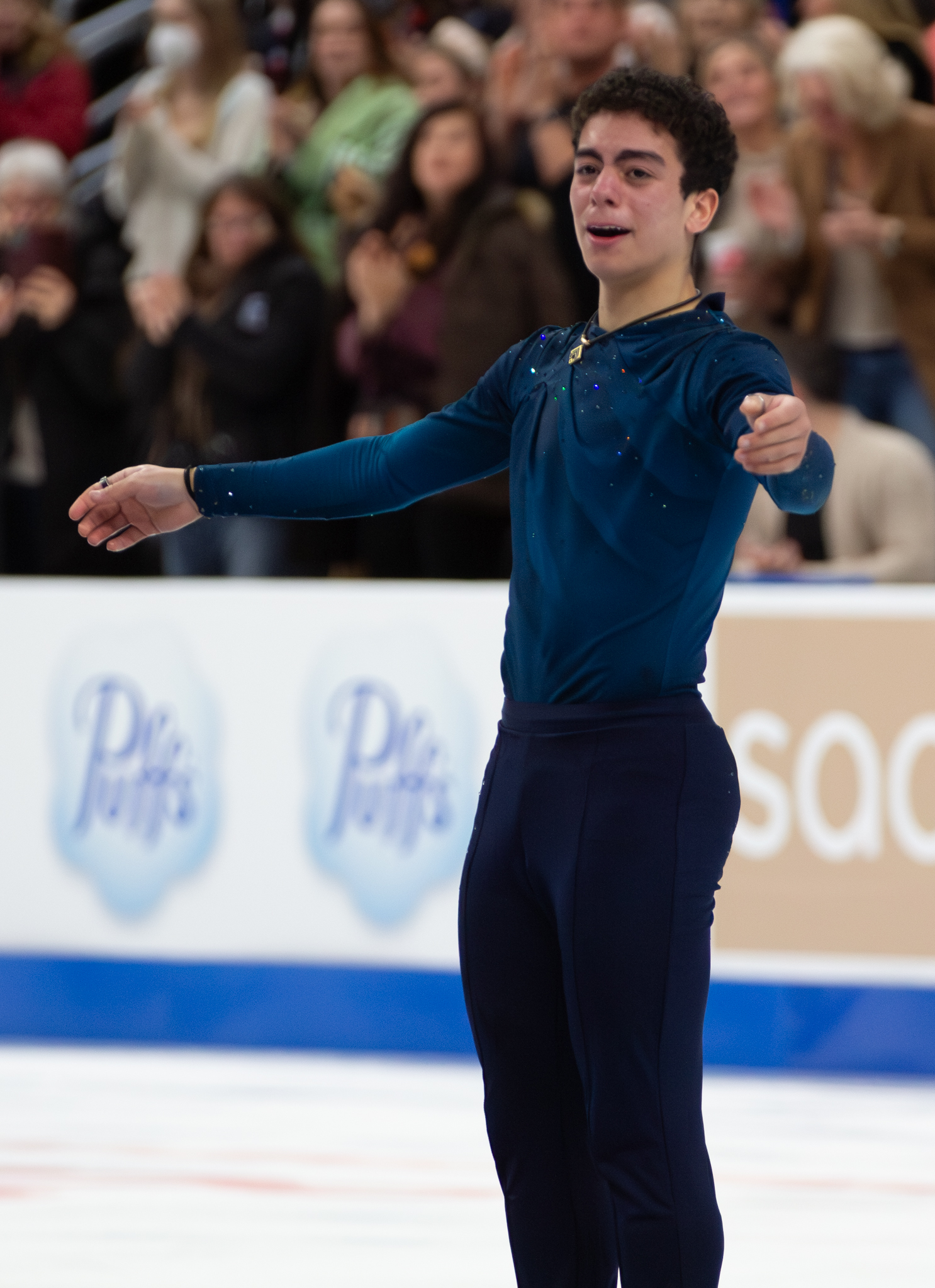
Sanchez following his free skate at the 2026 U.S. Championships

Sanchez started the season by competing on the 2025–26 ISU Challenger Series, finishing fifth at the 2025 CS Cranberry Cup International and sixth at the 2025 CS Nepela Memorial. He then went on to debut on the senior Grand Prix circuit in late October, finishing seventh at the 2025 Cup of China. The following month, he competed at the 2025 Ice Challenge, winning the silver medal.

In January, Sanchez placed fourth at the 2026 U.S. Figure Skating Championships, earning the pewter medal. "I think this really sets me up for the next quad," Sanchez summed up after the free skate. "I feel this is a really, really important year to perform because everybody will remember a memorable performance." He was subsequently named to the 2026 Four Continents team and 2026 World Junior Championships teams.

At the 2026 World Junior Championships, Sanchez placed fifth in the short program after putting a hand down on the first part of his triple Lutz-triple toe combination. He then placed fifth in the free skate, with a score of 148.07, placing fourth overall. "I think I still got a pretty good score, and I feel like I have seen a lot of progress from last Junior Worlds until now," said Sanchez after the free skate. "During the three-jump combination, I actually thought back to last year’s Worlds and how big that was for me. I am happy that I overcame that because I had been thinking about it a lot. But I was able to pull it off, and I had a couple of good saves out there, which I am really happy with. So I can really see the progress."

A few days before the 2026 World Championships, Jason Brown withdrew from the competition. Sanchez, as the third alternate, was called up to compete. At the World Championships, Sanchez placed tenth in the short program with 85.15 points and twelfth in the free skate with 156.59 points, finishing twelfth overall. He set personal best scores in both the short program and the total score.

==== 2026–27 season ====
Sanchez opened the new season by finishing 9th at the 2026 Kinoshita Group Cup. Sanchez later went onto place eighth at the 2026 Grand Prix de France; "My short program was a step forward from the first competition of the year. I'm a little disappointed with the combination, but there were more positives than negatives today. I'm pleased with my score. Getting close to 80 without a combination is a big thing, and it's my season's best so far."

== Programs ==
Season	Short program	Free skating	Exhibition
2020–21	Footloose (from Footloose) by Kenny Loggins choreo. by Larisa Selezneva	Newsies; Seize the Day; King of New York by Alan Menken choreo. by Larisa Selezneva	
2021–22	Footloose (from Footloose) by Kenny Loggins choreo. by Larisa Selezneva	Who Wants to Live Forever by Queen performed by The Tenors choreo. by Larisa Selezneva	
2022–23	Singin' in the Rain (from Glee) performed by Matthew Morrison; Rain Dance by Whilk & Misky choreo. by Larisa Selezneva	Who Wants to Live Forever by Queen performed by The Tenors choreo. by Larisa Selezneva	
2023–24	Singin' in the Rain (from Glee) performed by Matthew Morrison; Rain Dance by Whilk & Misky choreo. by Larisa Selezneva	Sarabande Suite by Globus choreo. by Sebastian Arrango, Adam Blake	
2024–25	Music by John Miles choreo. by Adam Blake, Larisa Selezneva	lo Ci Saro by Andrea Bocelli & Lang Lang choreo. by Adam Blake, Larisa Selezneva	Run by Joji
2025–26	Les parapules de Cherbourg by Michel Legrand performed by Mario Pelchat choreo. by Adam Blake	Dune: Part Two; Worm Ride; Stranded; Arrival; Worm Army by Hans Zimmer choreo. by Rohene Ward; Mercy Duet; Mercy Voiceless; Refuge by Max Richter & Ros Stephen choreo. by Adam Blake	Your Idol (from KPop Demon Hunters) by Saja Boys choreo. by Adam Blake
2026–27	Moon by Sofiane Pamart and Ludwig van Beethoven choreo. by Misha Ge	Demon Slayer Soundtrack by Diego Mitre choreo. by Adam Blake and Jacob Sanchez	

== Competitive highlights ==
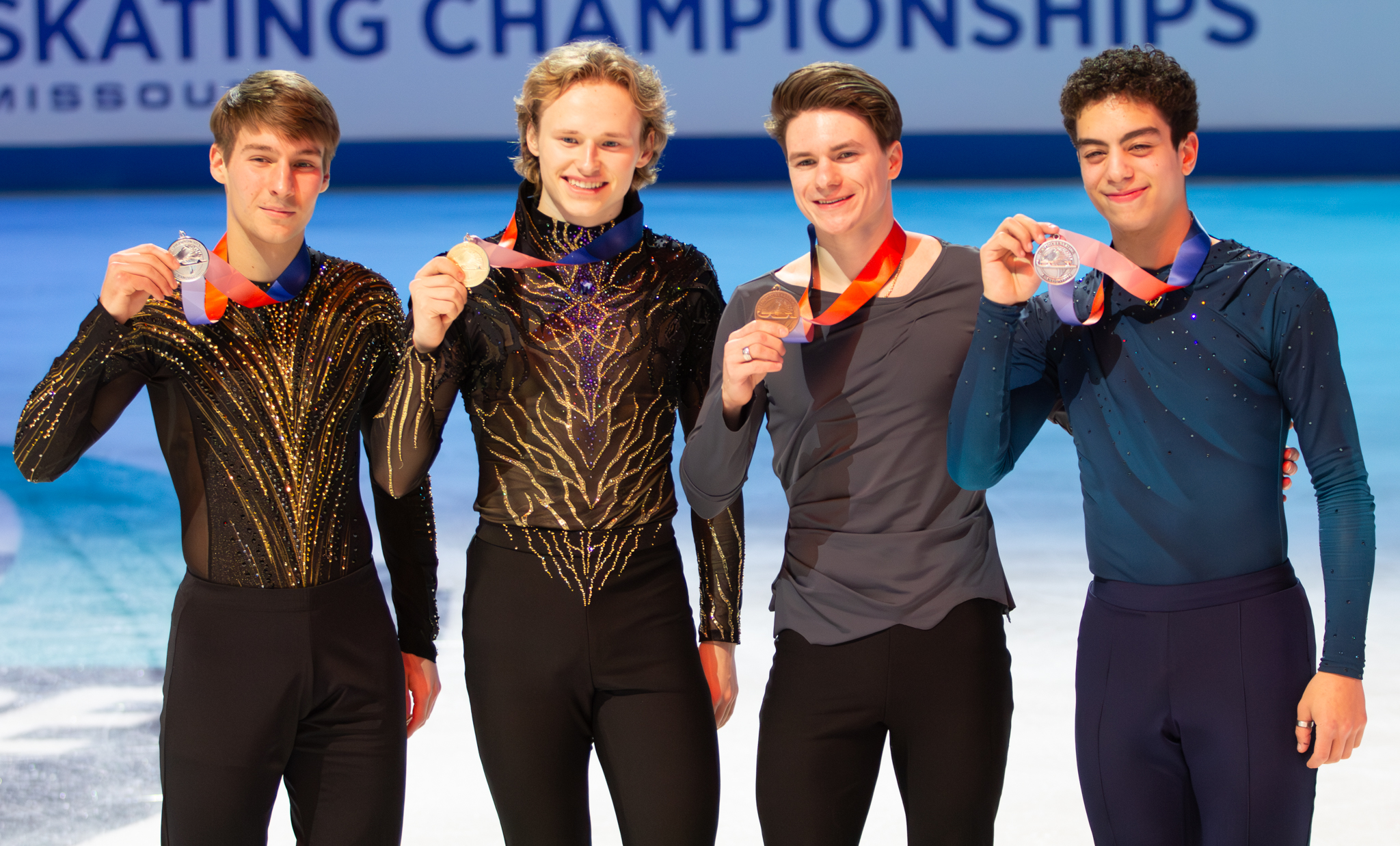
2026 U.S. Figure Skating Championships (from left to right): Andrew Torgashev, Ilia Malinin, Maxim Naumov, Jacob Sanchez

- GP – Event of the ISU Grand Prix Series
- JGP – Event of the ISU Junior Grand Prix Series
- CS – Event of the ISU Challenger Series
- TBD – Assigned
- WD – Withdrew from competition

Competition placements at senior level
Season	2024–25	2025–26	2026–27
World Championships		12th	
Four Continents Championships		8th	
U.S. Championships	7th	4th	
GP Cup of China		7th	11th
GP France			8th
CS Cranberry Cup		5th	
CS Golden Spin of Zagreb		5th	
CS Kinoshita Group Cup			9th
CS Nepela Memorial		6th	
CS Tallinn Trophy	1st		
Ice Challenge		2nd	

Competition placements at junior level
Season	2019–20	2020–21	2021–22	2022–23	2023–24	2024–25	2025–26
Winter Youth Olympics					4th		
Winter Youth Olympics (Team event)					2nd		
World Junior Championships					10th	4th	4th
Junior Grand Prix Final						1st	
U.S. Championships	17th	4th	9th	2nd			
JGP Hungary					5th		
JGP Poland			6th				
JGP Slovenia						1st	
JGP Thailand					4th		
JGP Turkey						1st	
Coupe du Printemps				1st			
Cranberry Cup			3rd	2nd		2nd	

== Detailed results ==
ISU personal best scores in the +5/-5 GOE System
Segment	Type	Score	Event
Total	TSS	241.74	2026 World Championships
Short program	TSS	85.15	2026 World Championships
Short program	TES	47.03	2024 JGP Slovenia
Short program	PCS	40.94	2025 CS Nepela Memorial
Free skating	TSS	161.68	2026 Four Continents Championships
Free skating	TES	84.17	2026 Four Continents Championships
Free skating	PCS	79.92	2026 World Championships

- At national events in the United States, pewter medals are awarded for fourth place.

=== Senior level ===
Results in the 2024–25 season
Date	Event	SP		FS		Total	
Date	Event	P	Score	P	Score	P	Score
Nov 11–17, 2024	(Estonia) 2024 CS Tallinn Trophy	2	76.63	1	148.97	1	225.60
Jan 20–26, 2025	(United States) 2025 U.S. Championships	6	82.64	6	146.89	7	229.53

Results in the 2025–26 season
Date	Event	SP		FS		Total	
Date	Event	P	Score	P	Score	P	Score
Aug 7–10, 2025	(United States) 2025 CS Cranberry Cup International	2	78.60	7	132.71	5	211.31
Sep 25–27, 2025	(Slovakia) 2025 CS Nepela Memorial	3	83.97	9	139.17	6	223.14
Oct 24–26, 2025	2025 Cup of China	9	72.40	5	148.81	7	221.21
Nov 5–9, 2025	(Austria) 2025 Ice Challenge	2	84.91	2	150.98	2	235.89
Dec 3–6, 2025	(Croatia) 2025 CS Golden Spin of Zagreb	10	75.31	3	141.28	5	216.59
Jan 4–11, 2026	(United States) 2026 U.S. Championships	7	81.27	3	167.80	4	249.07
Jan 21–25, 2026	(China) 2026 Four Continents Championships	11	78.57	7	161.68	8	240.25
Mar 24–29, 2026	(Czech Republic) 2026 World Championships	10	85.15	12	156.59	12	241.74

Results in the 2026–27 season
Date	Event	SP		FS		Total	
Date	Event	P	Score	P	Score	P	Score
Sep 4–6, 2026	(Japan) 2026 CS Kinoshita Group Cup	5	75.43	10	131.07	9	206.50
Oct 23–25, 2026	2026 Grand Prix de France	5	79.63	9	132.97	8	212.60
Nov 6–8, 2026	2026 Cup of China	11	79.45	11	124.94	11	204.39

=== Junior level ===
Results in the 2019–20 season
Date	Event	SP		FS		Total	
Date	Event	P	Score	P	Score	P	Score
Jan 20–26, 2020	(United States) 2020 U.S. Championships (Junior)	17	49.21	15	92.98	17	142.19

Results in the 2020–21 season
Date	Event	SP		FS		Total	
Date	Event	P	Score	P	Score	P	Score
Jan 11–21, 2021	(United States) 2021 U.S. Championships (Junior)	1	66.91	6	110.64	4	177.55

Results in the 2021–22 season
Date	Event	SP		FS		Total	
Date	Event	P	Score	P	Score	P	Score
Aug 11–15, 2021	(United States) 2021 Cranberry Cup International	3	67.08	3	113.24	3	180.32
Sep 29 – Oct 2, 2021	2021 JGP Poland	3	70.92	7	123.11	6	194.03
Jan 3–9, 2022	(United States) 2022 U.S. Championships (Junior)	13	48.41	8	106.62	9	155.03

Results in the 2022–23 season
Date	Event	SP		FS		Total	
Date	Event	P	Score	P	Score	P	Score
Aug 10–14, 2022	(United States) 2022 Cranberry Cup International	2	64.43	3	108.50	2	172.93
Jan 23–29, 2023	(United States) 2023 U.S. Championships (Junior)	4	69.85	2	143.72	2	213.57
Mar 17–19, 2023	(Luxembourg) 2023 Coupe du Printemps	1	70.29	1	142.34	1	212.63

Results in the 2023–24 season
Date	Event	SP		FS		Total	
Date	Event	P	Score	P	Score	P	Score
Aug 23–26, 2023	2023 JGP Thailand	1	77.69	5	123.80	4	201.49
Sep 20–23, 2023	2023 JGP Hungary	5	65.15	4	133.52	5	198.67
Jan 28–30, 2024	(South Korea) 2024 Winter Youth Olympics	1	76.38	6	123.90	4	200.28
Feb 1, 2024	(South Korea) 2024 Winter Youth Olympics (Team event)	—N/a	—N/a	2	129.77	2	129.77
Feb 26 – Mar 3, 2024	(Taiwan) 2024 World Junior Championships	9	73.35	15	125.85	10	199.17

Results in the 2024–25 season
Date	Event	SP		FS		Total	
Date	Event	P	Score	P	Score	P	Score
Aug 8–11, 2024	(United States) 2024 Cranberry Cup International	2	75.12	2	143.09	2	218.21
Sep 18–21, 2024	2024 JGP Turkey	1	81.14	1	139.11	1	220.25
Oct 2–5, 2024	2024 JGP Slovenia	1	85.09	1	144.37	1	229.46
Dec 5–8, 2024	(France) 2024–25 Junior Grand Prix Final	2	79.24	2	148.14	1	227.38
Feb 25 – Mar 2, 2025	(Hungary) 2025 World Junior Championships	3	82.88	5	147.53	4	230.41

Results in the 2025–26 season
Date	Event	SP		FS		Total	
Date	Event	P	Score	P	Score	P	Score
Mar 3–8, 2026	(Estonia) 2026 World Junior Championships	5	81.03	5	148.07	4	229.10
