= Kim Hyun-gyeom =

South Korean figure skater (born 2006)

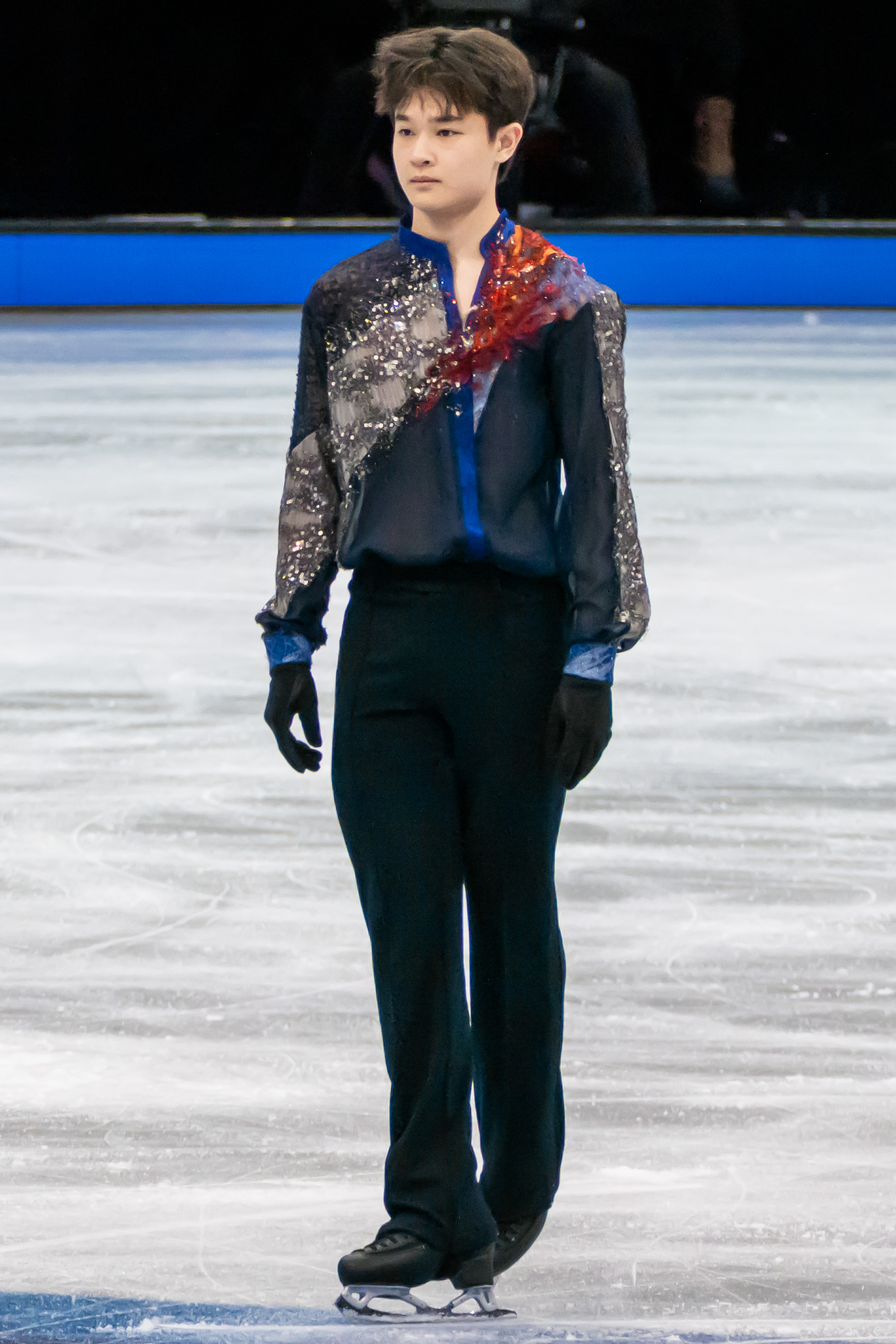
- Kim at the 2025 World Championships

Personal information
- Native name: 김현겸
- Full name: Kim Hyun-gyeom
- Born: June 27, 2006 (age 20) Seoul, South Korea
- Home town: Incheon, South Korea
- Height: 1.71 m (5 ft 7 in)

Figure skating career
- Country: South Korea
- Discipline: Men's singles
- Coach: Choi Hyung-kyung; Kim Na-hyun; Kim Min-seok
- Skating club: Hankwang High School

Medal record
South Korean Championships
Silver medal – second place	2023 Uijeongbu	Singles
Winter Youth Olympics
Gold medal – first place	2024 Gangwon	Singles
Gold medal – first place	2024 Gangwon	Team
Junior Grand Prix Final
Silver medal – second place	2023–24 Beijing	Singles

Kim Hyun-gyeom (Korean: 김현겸; born June 27, 2006) is a South Korean figure skater. He is the 2026 CS Tallinn Trophy bronze medalist and 2023 South Korean silver medalist. He represented South Korea at the 2026 Winter Olympics.

On the junior level, he is the 2024 Winter Youth Olympic champion in both the men's and team events, the 2023–24 Junior Grand Prix Final silver medalist, a two-time ISU Junior Grand Prix medalist, and the 2020 South Korean Junior bronze medalist.

== Personal life ==
Kim was born on June 27, 2006, in Seoul, South Korea. Before he began figure skating, Kim played soccer at a youth soccer academy. Moreover, he also practiced ballet and took piano lessons as a child.

Kim can speak some Japanese as a result of his mother being fluent in the language. He also speaks a bit of English. Kim currently attends Dankook University as a student.

He looks up to training mate, Cha Jun-hwan, as well as fellow skaters, Yuma Kagiyama and Adam Siao Him Fa.

== Career ==
=== Early career ===
Kim began figure skating at the age of eight and began training under Chi Hyun-jung at the age of nine.

As an intermediate novice skater, Kim competed at 2018 Asian Open Trophy, where he won the gold medal. He then went on to finish fourth at the 2019 Korean Junior Championships that same year.

The following season, at 2019 Asian Open Trophy, Kim won the bronze medal as an advanced novice. Then going on to compete at the 2020 Korean Junior Championships, Kim won the bronze medal.

=== 2020–21 season ===
Debuting on the senior national level, Kim placed eighth at the 2021 Korean Championships.

=== 2021–22 season: Junior international debut ===
Making his international Junior Grand Prix debut, Kim finished eighth and ninth at the JGP Poland and JGP Austria, respectively.

Following a seventh-place finish at the 2022 Korean Championships, Kim closed his season with a gold medal in the junior event of the 2022 Triglav Trophy.

=== 2022–23 season: Senior international debut ===
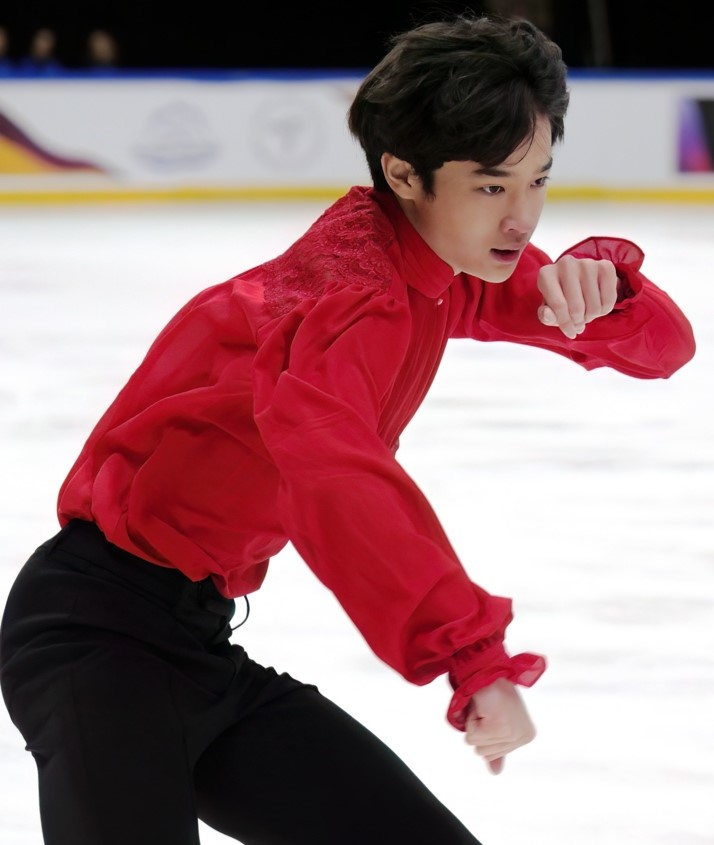
Kim at the 2022 CS Finlandia Trophy

Kim began the 2022–23 figure skating season by making his senior international debut at 2022 Ondrej Nepela Trophy, where he placed fourth before going on to finish twelfth at 2022 Finlandia Trophy.

At the 2023 Korean Championships, Kim managed to win the silver medal behind Cha Jun-hwan after delivering two clean performances. As a result, Kim was selected to represent South Korea at the 2023 World Junior Championships in Calgary, Alberta.

At those championships, Kim placed eighth in the short program and sixth in the free skate segments of the competitions, scoring personal bests and finishing sixth overall. This placement earned two spots for South Korean men's singles skaters at the 2024 World Junior Championships.

=== 2023–24 season: Youth Olympic gold ===
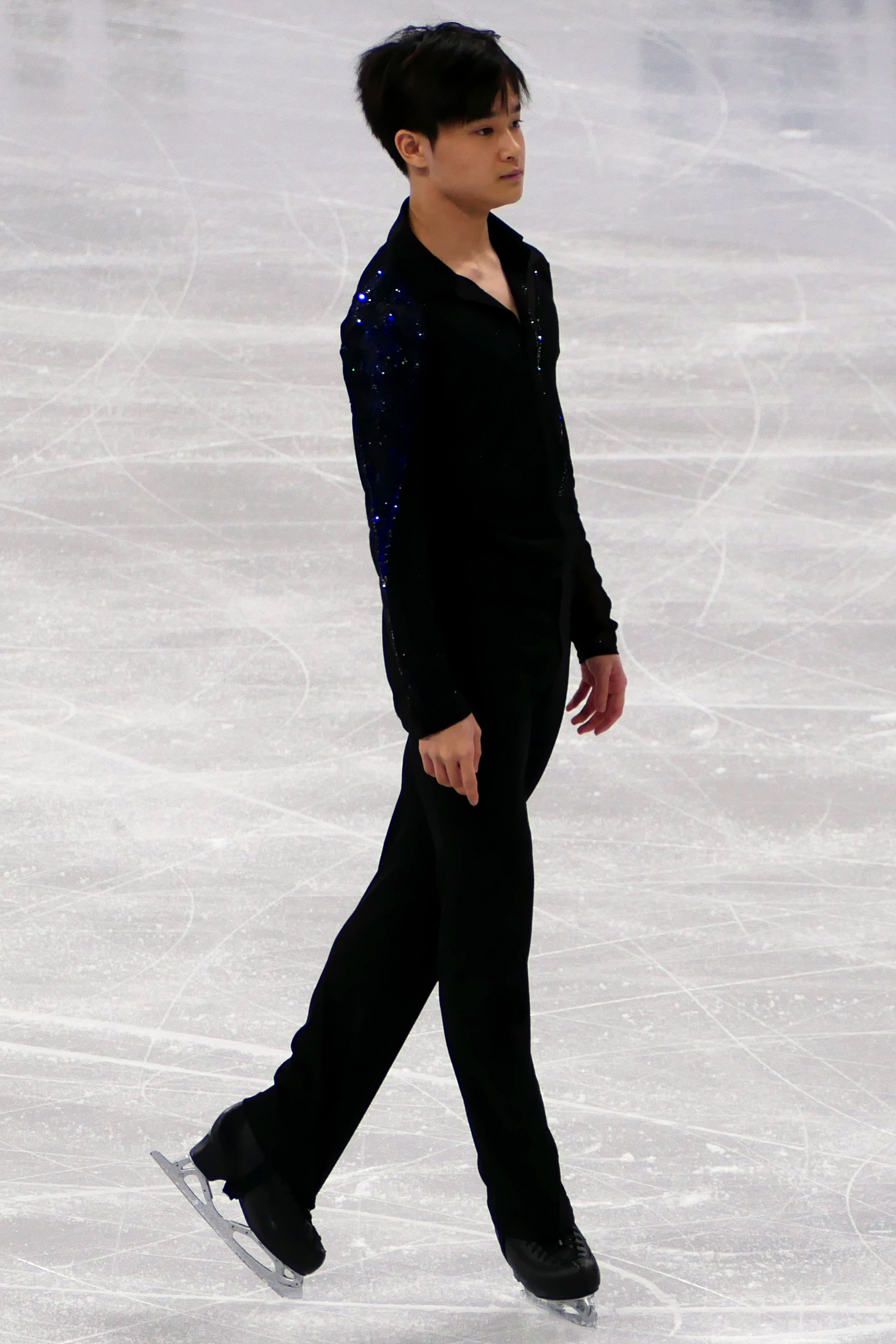
Kim during the short program at the 2024 World Championships

In late July, Kim competed at the 2023 South Korean ISU Junior Grand Prix Qualifiers, where he won the silver medal behind Seo Min-kyu, earning two assignments on the Junior Grand Prix circuit. At his first assignment, the 2023 JGP Austria, he won the silver medal and set a new personal best score in the free skate in the process. He was the only skater at the event to attempt quadruple jump, but it was deemed underrotated. Kim then won gold at the 2023 JGP Hungary, again improving his free skate personal best and setting a new personal best in total score as well. His results qualified him for the 2023–24 Junior Grand Prix Final. The following week he appeared on the senior level at the Nepela Memorial, finishing fourth for the second consecutive season.

Following the Junior Grand Prix, Kim won the national qualifier for the 2024 Winter Youth Olympics, to be hold on home ice in Gangwon. He went on to compete at the senior national ranking competition, finishing fourth.

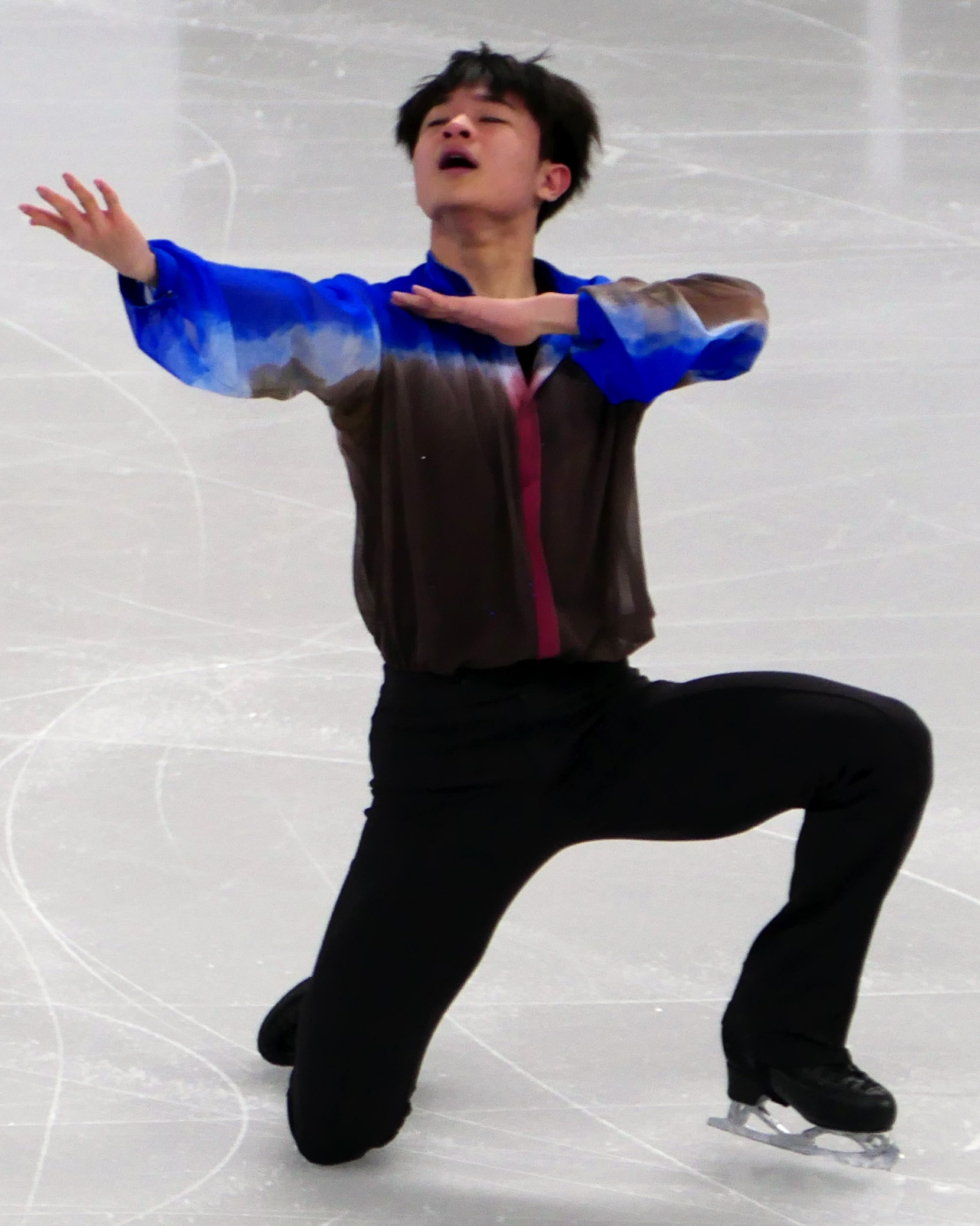
Kim during his free skate at the 2024 World Championships

Kim then competed at the Junior Grand Prix Final in Beijing, where he won the short program. Second in the free skate, he dropped to second overall and won the silver medal. After falling on his quad attempt, he said he was "not that satisfied with my performance" but "happy with the result." He went on to place fourth at the 2024 South Korean Championships. Due to Seo Min-kyu, who had placed ahead of him at Nationals, being age ineligible to compete at the 2024 World Championships in Montreal, Quebec, Canada, Kim was given one of the three spots to compete at the event.

At the Youth Olympics, Kim came third in the short program of the men's event. He won the free skate, rising to first overall and claiming the gold medal, the first Olympic medal for a Korean man. He then joined Team Korea for the team event, again winning the men's segment and winning gold with the rest of the team, another first for Korea.

Kim concluded the season making his senior World Championship debut, where he finished eighteenth.

=== 2024–25 season ===
Kim began the season with a seventh-place finish at the 2024 CS Cranberry Cup International. He would then go on to finish fourth at the 2024 Asian Open Trophy.

In early October, Kim competed at the 2024 Korean Universiade and Asian Games Qualifiers, where he placed second to Cha Jun-hwan. With this result, Kim was selected to represent South Korea at the 2025 Asian Winter Games. In late November, Kim would make his senior Grand Prix debut at the 2024 Cup of China, where he finished in ninth place. One week later, he competed at the annual South Korean Ranking Competition, where he placed fifth. With this result, Kim was named to the 2025 Four Continents Championships team. One month later, he finished fourth at the 2025 South Korean Championships.

In February, Kim competed at the 2025 Asian Winter Games in Harbin, China. During the short program, he took a hard fall on a triple axel attempt, spraining his ankle in the process. After placing tenth in that competition segment, Kim opted to withdraw before the free skate to allow his ankle to heal. One week following the event, Kim competed at the 2025 Four Continents Championships in Seoul, finishing the event in seventh place. Following the event, he left longtime coach, Chi Hyun-jung, and began training under Choi Hyung-kyung, Kim Na-hyun, and Kim Min-seok.

Initially named as the first alternate for the 2025 World team, Kim was ultimately called up to compete following the withdrawal of Lee Si-hyeong. He ultimately finished the event in twenty-sixth place.

=== 2025–26 season: Milano Cortina Olympics ===
Kim opened the season by winning the gold medal at the 2025 Asian Open Trophy.

At 2025 Skate to Milano, Kim Hyungyeom won the silver medal in the men's event. With this placement, Kim earned a second Olympic spot for South Korea in the men's event.

In November, he competed at the annual South Korean Ranking Competition, finishing in fourth place. Following the event, he was named to the 2026 Four Continents Championships. He went on to compete at the 2026 South Korean Championships, finishing fourth overall. Following the event, he was named to the 2026 Winter Olympic team. A couple weeks later, Kim finished seventeenth at the 2026 Four Continents Championships in Beijing, China.

On 10 February, Kim competed in the short program segment at the 2026 Winter Olympics, placing twenty-sixth. He did not advance to the free skate segment.

In March, Kim competed at the 2026 World Championships. He placed twenty-eighth in the short program and did not advance to the free skate.

=== 2026–27 season ===
Kim opened the new season placing eleventh at the 2026 Kinoshita Group Cup. In October, Kim competed at the 2026 Skate Canada International, concluding the event in eleventh place overall.

== Programs ==
Season	Short program	Free skating	Exhibition	Refs.
2015–16		The Pink Panther Theme by Henry Mancini choreo. by Kim Chae-hwa		
2016–17	Love Me Tender; Hound Dog by Elvis Presley choreo. by Sin Na-hee	Over the Rainbow by Harold Arlen choreo. by Kim Hyeon-jung		
2017–18	Billie Jean by Michael Jackson choreo. by Lee Hyun-jung	Grease by Grease Live! Cast choreo. by Lee Hyun-jung		
2018–19	Billie Jean by Michael Jackson choreo. by Lee Hyun-jung	Smile by Nat King Cole choreo. by Kim Jin-seo		
2019–20	All of Me by John Legend choreo. by Shin Yea-ji	Bohemian Rhapsody; Radio Ga Ga by Queen choreo. by Shin Yea-ji		
2020–21	Brucia la terra (from The Godfather) by Nino Rota performed by Andrea Bocelli choreo. by Shin Yea-ji	Sherlock Holmes; Discombobulate; Catatonic; I Never Woke Up in Handcuffs by Hans Zimmer choreo. by Shin Yea-ji		
2021–22	E lucevan le stelle (from Tosca) by Giacomo Puccini performed by Luciano Pavarotti, Leone Magiera, & Royal Philharmonic Orchestra choreo. by Shin Yea-ji	The Man in the Iron Mask; Surrounded; Heart of a King by Nick Glennie-Smith choreo. by Shin Yea-ji		
2022–23	Mi Mancherai (from Il Postino: The Postman) by Luis Bacalov & Marco Marinangeli performed by Josh Groban & Joshua Bell choreo. by Shin Yea-ji	West Side Story by Leonard Bernstein & Stephen Sondheim; Prologue; Jet Song performed by Mike Faist, Kyle Coffman, Kevin Csolak, John Michael Fiumara, & Patrick Higgins; Maria performed by Ansel Elgort; Cool performed by Ansel Elgort & Mike Faist choreo. by Shin Yea-ji		
2023–24	Music by John Miles choreo. by Shin Yea-ji	Requiem for a Dream by Clint Mansell; Main Theme by Jonas Kvarnström & Clint Mansell; Southern Hospitality by Clint Mansell & Kronos Quartet; Requiem for a Dream - Requiem for a Basilosaurus (Octopus) by Octopus arranged by Cédric Tour choreo. by Benoît Richaud		
2024–25	Amuse Bouche (from The Menu) by Colin Stetson choreo. by Stéphane Lambiel; Music by John Miles choreo. by Shin Yea-ji	Hold on to Hope in the Dark Times (from Dragonheart: Vengeance) by Mark McKenzie; Einon; To the Stars (from Dragonheart) by Randy Edelman choreo. by Shin Yea-ji	Mi Mancherai (from Il Postino: The Postman) by Luis Bacalov & Marco Marinangeli performed by Josh Groban & Joshua Bell choreo. by Shin Yea-ji	
2025–26	Amuse Bouche (from The Menu) by Colin Stetson choreo. by Stéphane Lambiel; Peponi (Paradise) by The Piano Guys & Alex Boyé; Paradise by Coldplay choreo. by Shin Yea-ji	Lawrence of Arabia by Maurice Jarre; First Entrance to the Desert / Night and Star / Lawrence and Tafas by Maurice Jarre; Lawrence d'Arabie – Overture performed by City of Prague Philharmonic Orchestra; Lawrence of Arabia (Main Title) performed by London Symphony Orchestra & Stanley Black; Main Title / That is the Desert / Overture performed by Philharmonia Orchestra choreo. by Misha Ge	Mi Mancherai (from Il Postino: The Postman) by Luis Bacalov & Marco Marinangeli performed by Josh Groban & Joshua Bell choreo. by Shin Yea-ji	
2026–27	Peponi (Paradise) by The Piano Guys	Suite (From "Lawrence Of Arabia")		

== Competitive highlights ==
- GP – Event of the ISU Grand Prix Series
- JGP – Event of the ISU Junior Grand Prix Series
- CS – Event of the ISU Challenger Series
- TBD – Assigned
- WD – Withdrew from competition

Competition placements at senior level
Season	2020–21	2021–22	2022–23	2023–24	2024–25	2025–26	2026–27
Winter Olympics						26th	
World Championships				18th	26th	28th	
Four Continents Championships					7th	17th	
South Korean Championships	8th	7th	2nd	4th	4th		
GP Cup of China					9th		
GP Skate Canada							11th
CS Cranberry Cup					7th		
CS Finlandia Trophy			12th				
CS Kinoshita Group Cup							11th
CS Tallinn Trophy							3rd
Asian Open Trophy					4th	1st	
Skate to Milano						2nd	
Asian Games					WD		

Competition placements at junior level
Season	2018–19	2019–20	2021–22	2022–23	2023–24
Winter Youth Olympics					1st
Winter Youth Olympics (Team event)					1st
World Junior Championships				6th	
Junior Grand Prix Final					2nd
South Korean Championships	4th	3rd			
JGP Austria			9th		2nd
JGP Hungary					1st
JGP Poland			8th		
Triglav Trophy			1st		

== Detailed results ==
ISU personal best scores in the +5/-5 GOE System
Segment	Type	Score	Event
Total	TSS	230.46	2023 CS Nepela Memorial
Short program	TSS	81.15	2024 CS Cranberry Cup International
Short program	TES	45.20	2026 Skate Canada International
Short program	PCS	36.16	2024 CS Cranberry Cup International
Free skating	TSS	155.22	2023 CS Nepela Memorial
Free skating	TES	82.98	2024 Cup of China
Free skating	PCS	73.26	2023 CS Nepela Memorial

=== Senior level ===
Results in the 2020–21 season
Date	Event	SP		FS		Total	
Date	Event	P	Score	P	Score	P	Score
Feb 24–26, 2021	(South Korea) 2021 South Korean Championships	8	47.27	8	99.32	8	146.59

Results in the 2021–22 season
Date	Event	SP		FS		Total	
Date	Event	P	Score	P	Score	P	Score
Jan 7–9, 2022	(South Korea) 2022 South Korean Championships	6	66.18	7	133.10	7	199.28

Results in the 2022–23 season
Date	Event	SP		FS		Total	
Date	Event	P	Score	P	Score	P	Score
Sep 29 – Oct 1, 2022	(Slovakia) 2022 CS Nepela Memorial	7	67.21	4	134.98	4	202.19
Oct 4–9, 2022	(Finland) 2022 CS Finlandia Trophy	13	63.87	11	129.11	12	192.98
Jan 5–8, 2023	(South Korea) 2023 South Korean Championships	3	78.60	3	158.63	2	237.23

Results in the 2023–24 season
Date	Event	SP		FS		Total	
Date	Event	P	Score	P	Score	P	Score
Sep 28–30, 2023	(Slovakia) 2023 CS Nepela Memorial	8	75.24	4	155.22	4	230.46
Jan 4–7, 2024	(South Korea) 2024 South Korean Championships	3	79.44	6	150.06	4	229.50
Mar 18–24, 2024	(Canada) 2024 World Championships	21	74.89	18	147.90	18	222.79

Results in the 2024–25 season
Date	Event	SP		FS		Total	
Date	Event	P	Score	P	Score	P	Score
Aug 8–11, 2024	(United States) 2024 CS Cranberry Cup International	5	81.15	8	136.27	7	217.42
Sep 2–6, 2024	(Hong Kong) 2024 Asian Open Trophy	5	77.36	4	140.65	4	218.01
Nov 22–24, 2024	2024 Cup of China	11	67.76	8	148.88	9	216.64
Jan 2–5, 2025	(South Korea) 2025 South Korean Championships	3	81.30	4	158.95	4	240.25
Feb 19–23, 2025	(South Korea) 2025 Four Continents Championships	8	73.62	6	152.50	7	226.12
Mar 25–30, 2025	(United States) 2025 World Championships	26	72.82	-	-	26	72.82

Results in the 2025–26 season
Date	Event	SP		FS		Total	
Date	Event	P	Score	P	Score	P	Score
Aug 1–5, 2025	(Philippines) 2025 Asian Open Trophy	1	72.14	1	143.00	1	215.14
Sep 18–21, 2025	(China) 2025 Skate to Milano	4	74.69	2	153.91	2	228.60
Jan 3–6, 2026	(South Korea) 2026 South Korean Championships	4	79.60	4	156.14	4	235.74
Jan 21–25, 2026	(China) 2026 Four Continents Championships	17	67.50	15	141.42	17	208.92
Feb 10–13, 2026	(Italy) 2026 Winter Olympics	26	69.30	—N/a	—N/a	26	69.30
Mar 24–29, 2026	(Czech Republic) 2026 World Championships	28	70.71	—N/a	—N/a	28	70.71

Results in the 2026-27 season
Date	Event	SP		FS		Total	
Date	Event	P	Score	P	Score	P	Score
Sep 4–6, 2026	(Japan) 2026 CS Kinoshita Group Cup	8	73.01	12	121.85	11	194.86
Oct 30 - Nov 1, 2026	2026 Skate Canada International	6	77.76	11	121.43	11	199.19
Nov 16–22, 2026	(Estonia) 2026 CS Tallinn Trophy	2	79.57	4	133.67	3	213.24

=== Junior level ===
Results in the 2018–19 season
Date	Event	SP		FS		Total	
Date	Event	P	Score	P	Score	P	Score
Jan 11–13, 2019	(South Korea) 2019 South Korean Championships (Junior)	5	34.76	4	74.72	4	109.48

Results in the 2019–20 season
Date	Event	SP		FS		Total	
Date	Event	P	Score	P	Score	P	Score
Jan 3–5, 2020	(South Korea) 2020 South Korean Championships (Junior)	3	42.93	3	90.67	3	133.60

Results in the 2021–22 season
Date	Event	SP		FS		Total	
Date	Event	P	Score	P	Score	P	Score
Sep 29 – Oct 2, 2021	2021 JGP Poland	7	62.30	8	119.40	8	181.70
Oct 6–9, 2021	2021 JGP Austria	7	62.42	9	114.91	9	177.33
Apr 13–17, 2022	(Slovenia) 2022 Triglav Trophy	1	66.29	1	129.45	1	195.74

Results in the 2022–23 season
Date	Event	SP		FS		Total	
Date	Event	P	Score	P	Score	P	Score
Feb 27 – Mar 5, 2023	(Canada) 2023 World Junior Championships	8	75.77	6	137.79	6	213.56

Results in the 2023–24 season
Date	Event	SP		FS		Total	
Date	Event	P	Score	P	Score	P	Score
Aug 30 – Sep 2, 2023	2023 JGP Austria	2	73.45	3	138.31	2	211.76
Sep 20–23, 2023	2023 JGP Hungary	2	72.61	1	149.54	1	222.15
Dec 7–10, 2023	(China) 2023–24 Junior Grand Prix Final	1	77.01	2	146.60	2	223.61
Jan 27–29, 2024	(South Korea) 2024 Winter Youth Olympics	3	69.28	1	147.45	1	216.73
Feb 1, 2024	(South Korea) 2024 Winter Youth Olympics (Team event)	—N/a	—N/a	1	136.38	1	—N/a
