= Shin Ji-a =

South Korean figure skater (born 2008)

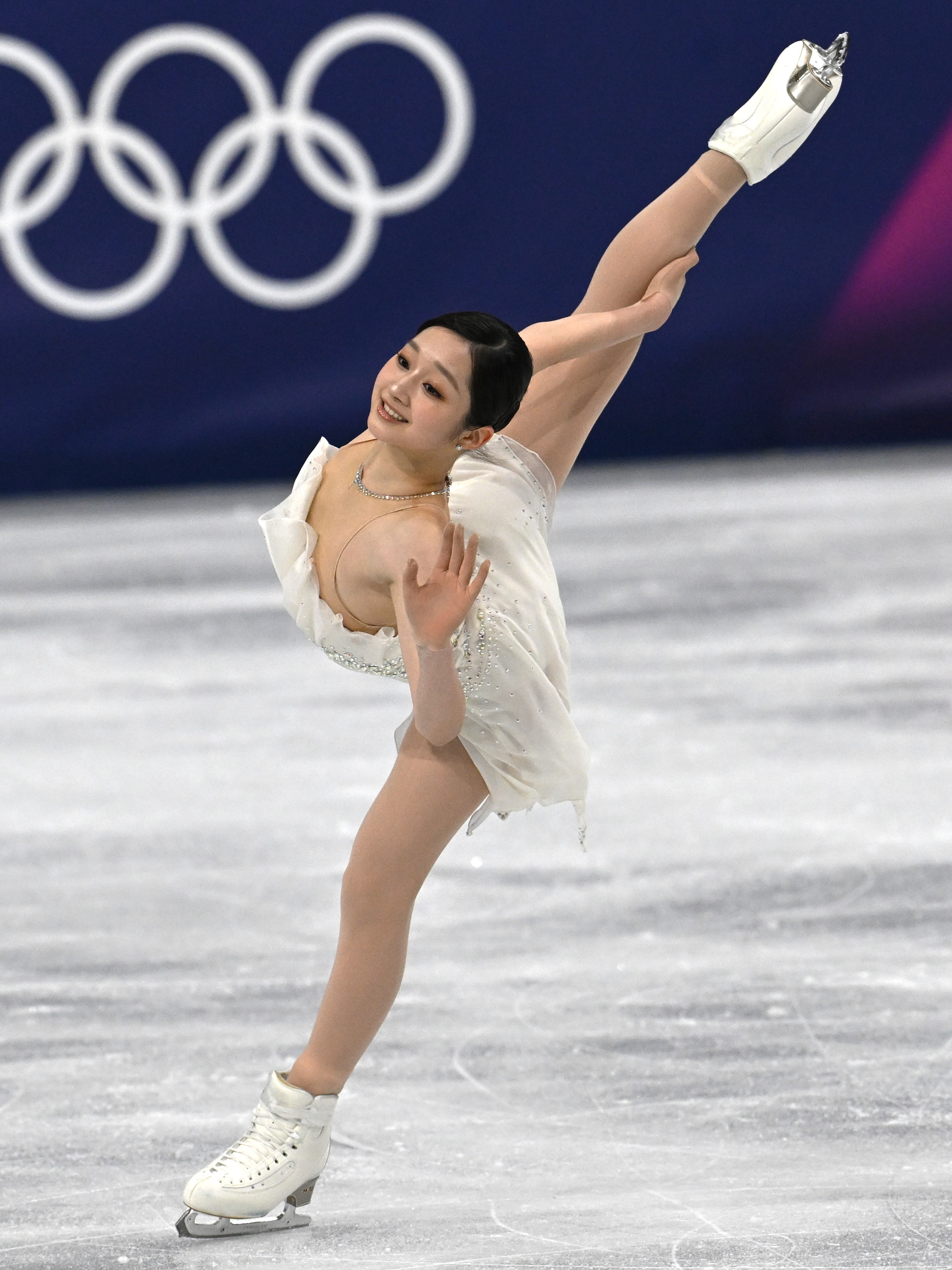
- Shin performing a Kerrigan spiral at the 2026 Winter Olympics

Personal information
- Native name: 신지아
- Other names: Jia Shin; Sin Ji-a
- Born: March 19, 2008 (age 18) Busan, South Korea
- Home town: Seoul, South Korea
- Height: 1.56 m (5 ft 1 in)

Figure skating career
- Country: South Korea
- Coach: Chi Hyun-jung; Kim Jin-seo
- Began skating: 2015
Medal record
Figure skating: Women's singles
Representing South Korea
Youth Olympic Games
Silver medal – second place	2024 Gangwon	Women's singles
World Junior Championships
Silver medal – second place	2022 Tallinn	Women's singles
Silver medal – second place	2023 Calgary	Women's singles
Silver medal – second place	2024 Taipei	Women's singles
Silver medal – second place	2025 Debrecen	Women's singles
Junior Grand Prix Final
Silver medal – second place	2022–23 Turin	Women's singles
Silver medal – second place	2023–24 Beijing	Women's singles
South Korean Championships
Gold medal – first place	2026 Seoul	Women's singles
Silver medal – second place	2025 Uijeongbu	Women's singles
Gold medal – first place	2024 Uijeongbu	Women's singles
Gold medal – first place	2023 Uijeongbu	Women's singles

Shin Ji-a (Korean: 신지아; born 19 March 2008) is a South Korean figure skater. She is a three-time South Korean champion (2023, 2024, 2026), the 2025 CS Cranberry Cup International bronze medalist, the 2025 CS Nebelhorn Trophy bronze medalist, and the 2026 CS Lombardia Trophy silver medalist.

On the junior level, Shin is the 2024 Youth Olympic silver medalist, the 2024 Youth Olympic champion in the team event, a four-time World Junior silver medalist (2022, 2023, 2024, 2025), a two-time Junior Grand Prix Final silver medalist (2022–23, 2023–24), and a five-time ISU Junior Grand Prix medalist (including gold at the 2022 JGP Latvia, the 2023 JGP Austria, and the 2023 JGP Hungary), and the 2021 South Korean Junior champion.

Shin represented South Korea at the 2026 Winter Olympics.

== Personal life ==
Shin was born on March 19, 2008, in Busan, South Korea.

In addition to figure skating, she enjoys baking and knitting as hobbies.

She looks up to Yuna Kim and Yuma Kagiyama.

== Career ==
=== Early years ===
Shin began learning to skate in 2015 at the age of seven, having been inspired from watching videos of Kim Yu-na skating on YouTube. The following year, she moved from Busan to Daegu to receive professional training before relocating to Seoul after entering the fifth grade.

She won the national junior gold medal at the 2021 South Korean Championships.

=== 2021–22 season: Junior World silver ===
Making her international debut on the Junior Grand Prix at the 2021 JGP Slovenia in Ljubljana, Shin finished in sixth place. The following week, she competed in her second event on the circuit, the 2021 JGP Poland in Gdańsk. She ranked second in the short program and third in the long due to a fall on the opening triple lutz. Shin won the bronze medal with only a 0.03 point gap from silver medalist Elizaveta Kulikova. In her first senior event, Shin was fourth at the 2022 South Korean Championships.

Shin was assigned to compete at the 2022 World Junior Championships, but events would soon complicate the situation. The International Skating Union banned all Russian athletes from competing at ISU championships. As Russian women had dominated international figure skating in recent years, this had a significant impact on the field. Due the Omicron variant, the World Junior Championships could not be held as scheduled in Sofia in early March and were rescheduled for mid-April in Tallinn. Shin finished second in the short program, 3.12 points behind segment leader Isabeau Levito of the United States. She went on to win the free skate, taking a gold small medal for that segment but remained in second overall behind Levito by 0.54 points. She was only the second South Korean to win a World Junior medal, the first one being Yuna Kim.

=== 2022–23 season: First national title, Junior World silver, and JGP Final silver ===
Shin began the season on the Junior Grand Prix, winning the gold medal at the 2022 JGP Latvia in Riga. This included a new personal best in the short program, clearing 70 points in that segment for the first time. At her second event, the second of two Polish Junior Grand Prixes held in Gdańsk, she won the silver medal behind Japanese skater Ami Nakai. With a total of 28 points, Shin qualified to the 2022–23 Junior Grand Prix Final.

After winning the national ranking competition in Uijeongbu in early December, Shin traveled to Turin the following week for the Junior Grand Prix Final. She skated a clean short program, placing second just 0.55 points behind the leader, Japan's Mao Shimada. Referring to performing again so soon after the ranking competition, Shin said she was "really tired, but it's OK." She was second in the free skate and also second overall, saying she was "satisfied with the result, the clean program, and the silver medal." She and bronze medalist Kim Chae-yeon were the first Korean women to medal since Kim Yu-na in 2005. She reflected on Kim as her inspiration, noting "I want to follow her path.".

Shin placed second in the short program at the 2023 South Korean Championships, behind Kim Ye-lim, after stepping out of her jump combination. She won the free skate despite colliding with the boards attempting the same jump combination, and overtook Kim to take the gold medal.

Due to her ineligibility for senior competition, Shin was assigned to finish her season at the 2023 World Junior Championships in Calgary. Entering as the defending silver medalist, she finished second in the short program with a new personal best 71.19, 0.59 points behind segment leader Shimada. She cleanly landed most of her jumps in the free skate, only to fall at the end of her choreographic sequence and take a one-point deduction. She finished narrowly second in the segment, just ahead of Nakai, and won her second consecutive Junior World silver medal. Calling this "a great highlight" after having felt sick earlier in the week, she also stated that she planned to work with veteran choreographer David Wilson on programs for the following season.

=== 2023–24 season: Coaching change, second national title, Youth Olympic silver, Junior World silver, and JGP Final silver ===
In July 2023, Shin announced that she had left Seoul and moved to Chiba, Japan, to train at the MF Figure Skating Academy under Kensuke Nakaniwa and alongside the 2023 World Junior bronze medalist, Ami Nakai. She subsequently had to return to train in Korea, citing "minor injuries and problems with high school entrance exams." Chi Hyun-jung and Kim Jin-seo became her new coaches. Shin began by competing at the 2023 South Korean ISU Junior Grand Prix Qualifiers, where she debuted her 2023–2024 programs. Shin skated a clean short program, earning 69.32 points, ranking first in the segment, and also a clean free skate, earning 139.48 points, ranking first both in the segment and overall. Her performance earned her two assignments on the Junior Grand Prix circuit. At the 2023 JGP Austria, she finished first in both segments and won the gold medal by a 33-point margin over silver medalist Haruna Murakami of Japan. She achieved a similarly dominant result at the 2023 JGP Hungary in Budapest, placing first in both segments and finishing nearly 24 points ahead of the silver medalist, fellow Korean skater Kim Yu-seong. She erred only once in each program, in both cases an underrotation call on one jump. These results secured Shin her second consecutive Junior Grand Prix Final berth; of this, she said "I am honoured and I will do my best."

Shin then competed at the national qualifying competition for the 2024 Winter Youth Olympics, to be held on home soil in Gangwon. She placed first in both segments to win the gold medal, and was named to one of Korea's two berths in the women's competition, along with Kim Yu-seong. She went on to win the senior national ranking competition for the second consecutive season.

Shin narrowly won the short program at the Junior Grand Prix Final in Beijing, despite turning out of her jump combination, after chief rival Mao Shimada made a more significant error on her triple Lutz jump. In the free skate she made only two minor errors, receiving an incorrect edge call on a triple flip and a quarter underrotation on a loop, but was unable to match Shimada, who landed both a triple Axel and a quadruple toe loop. She won her second consecutive Final silver, and said she was "really happy" with the result.

At the 2024 South Korean Championships in early January, Shin won the gold medal for the second consecutive time. With this result, Shin was selected to compete at the World Junior Championships for the third consecutive year.

At the end of January, Shin competed in the women's event at the Youth Olympics, in what was considered another matchup between herself and Shimada. She placed third in the short program after a heavy landing on the first part of her jump combination caused her to perform only a double jump as the second half. She finished second in the free skate, 0.59 points behind Shimada, after underrotating a triple flip and performing an invalid spin, and moved up to second overall as a result, securing another silver medal behind Shimada. Saying she was "too nervous today,” Shin assessed that "I was fortunate I didn't make any big mistakes until the end. I feel really happy to get a medal in front of the home crowd." Days later, Shin was part of Team Korea in the team event. She finished first in the women's segment, setting a new personal best score of 137.48, while the team went on to win the gold medal.

Shin concluded the season at the 2024 World Junior Championships, in another contest with Shimada. She won the short program with a new personal best 73.48 points, 0.88 points ahead of Shimada, earning a gold small medal. She skated a clean free skate, but finished second to Shimada, who landed a quadruple jump, and took her third consecutive World Junior silver medal. Shin said she was satisfied with her performance in the free skate, though adding she was "a little bit sad" that it was the last time she would perform her "Not About Angels" program.

=== 2024–25 season: Coaching change and Junior World silver ===
Shin began the season by winning the 2024 South Korean ISU Junior Grand Prix Qualifiers and was given two Junior Grand Prix assignments as a result of her placement. In August 2024, it was announced that Shin had moved to Toronto, Canada, to train at the Toronto Cricket, Skating and Curling Club with coaches Brian Orser and Tracy Wilson.

In her first appearance on the Junior Grand Prix, Shin was considered the pre-event favourite at the 2024 JGP Thailand, but placed sixth in the short program. In the free skate, she fell twice, but managed to place third in that segment of the competition. She moved up to fourth place overall, missing the podium by less than two points. Weeks later, Shin delivered stronger performances at the 2024 JGP Slovenia, where she won the silver medal. With these results, Shin was named as the first alternate for the 2024–25 Junior Grand Prix Final. In late November, Shin competed at the South Korean Ranking Competition, where she debuted a new free skate to the music of Liebesträume No. 3 in A-Flat Minor by Franz Liszt. There, she won the silver medal behind Kim Chae-yeon. One month later, at the 2025 South Korean Championships, Shin once again finished second to Kim.

In February, it was announced that Shin had added former coach, Chi Hyun-jung, to her coaching team, whilst continuing to train in Toronto. Going on to compete at the 2025 World Junior Championships in Debrecen, Hungary, Shin fell on her jump combination in the short program, coming seventh in the segment, albeit less than four points back of third. “I’m quite disappointed,” said Shin after the short program. “I trained really well for this competition, and I actually felt confident." In the free skate she had another fall on her triple Lutz-triple toe loop combination, but still placed second in the segment and climbed to second overall, claiming her fourth consecutive World Junior silver medal, the third time in a row with Mao Shimada the gold medalist. Speaking afterward, Shin remarked she was "honored to get, for the fourth time, a medal at the World Junior Championships and I have been with Mao on the podium three times. She is always cheering me up."

=== 2025–26 season: Milano Cortina Olympics, senior international debut, and third national title ===
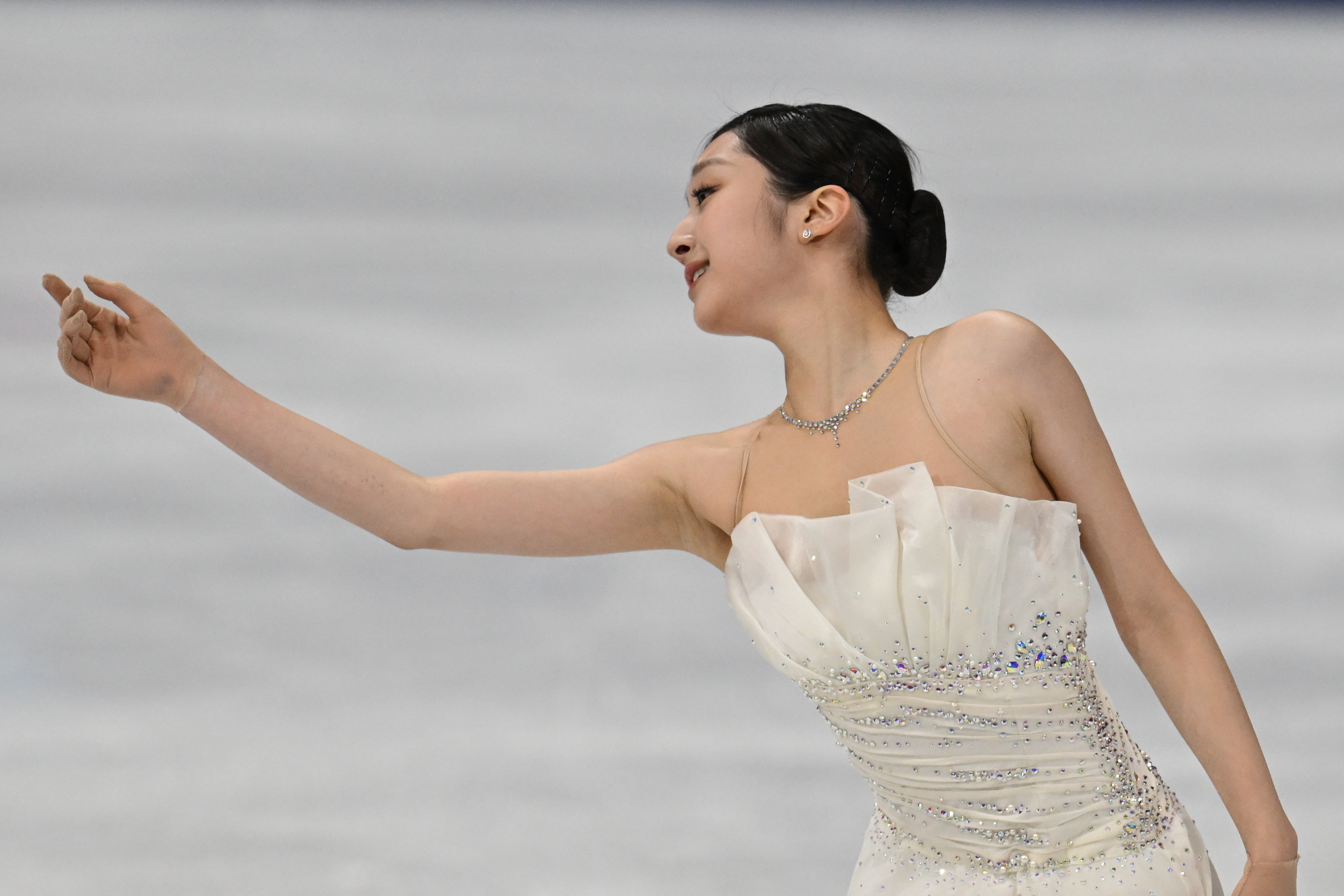
Shin during her free skate at the 2026 Winter Olympics

In July, it was announced Shin had left the Toronto Cricket, Skating and Curling Club and moved back to Seoul, where Chi Hyun-jung was working as her head coach. Speaking on the move, she shared, "I really liked how I could fully focus on training in Toronto. The experience felt fresh and exciting in a way that was different from being in Korea. I’m also grateful for the warm support I received from everyone at TCC."

The following month, Shin started the season by making her senior international debut at the 2025 CS Cranberry Cup International and winning the bronze medal. She followed this up with another bronze medal at the 2025 CS Nebelhorn Trophy. Between the two events, Shin opted to return to her Liebesträume free program from the previous season, sharing that she did not feel as "comfortable and connected" to her intended Spartacus free program.

Although initially only assigned to compete at the Cup of China on the Grand Prix series, she was later assigned to compete at the Grand Prix de France following the withdrawal of Niina Petrõkina.

She placed seventh overall at 2025 Grand Prix de France. Following the event, she said she was focused on improving her skating skills to compete among strong senior skaters. One week later, Shin competed at the 2025 Cup of China, where she finished in fifth place overall. After the disappointing grand prix series, Shin went on to compete in the 2025 South Korea National Ranking Competition. There she went on to win the gold medal with a total score of 216.20, ahead of silver medalist, Kim Yu-jae and bronze medalist, Kim Chae-yeon. "I was very upset because my Grand Prix results this season weren't good, but I tried to forget about it quickly", and "I will do my best to prepare well for the remaining time and compete in the Olympics," said Shin after taking first place. With this result, Shin was named to the 2026 Four Continents team.

In January, Shin competed at the 2026 South Korean Championships, winning her third national title. Following the event, she was named to the 2026 Winter Olympic team. Later that month, at the 2026 Four Continents Champions in Beijing, China, Shin placed fourteenth in the short program after falling twice but delivered a stronger free skate, placing fifth in that segment and moving up to sixth place overall. "Until yesterday, my mind was really complicated, and I was a little worried," she said after the free skate. "There was a free program left, so I tried to forget it quickly."

On February 6, Shin placed fourth in the short program in the 2026 Winter Olympics Figure Skating Team Event. "This was my first Olympic skate for the team event," she said. "It was such an honor for me. I really want to thank my team members for cheering for me. This is why I enjoyed my performance so much!"

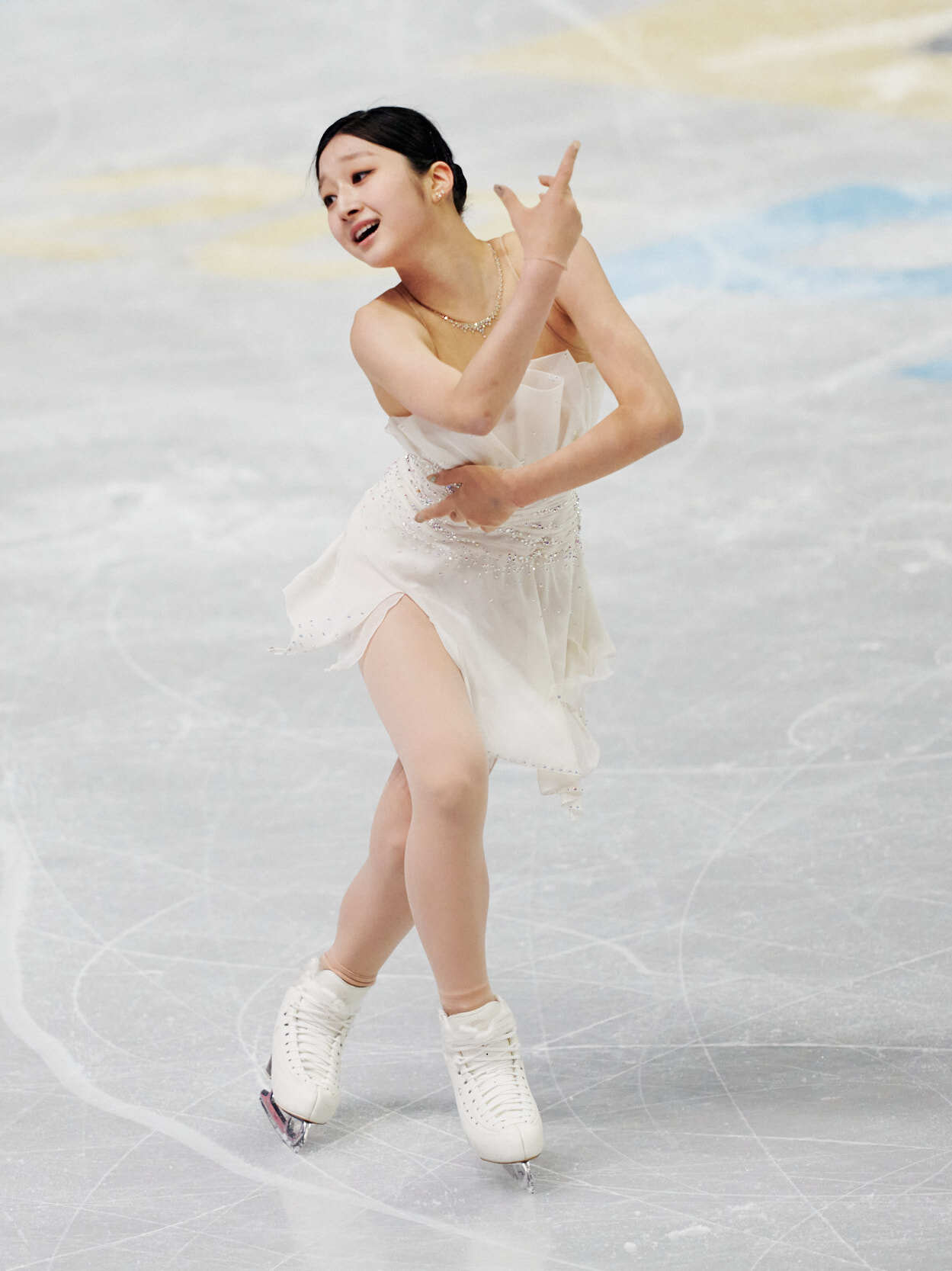
Shin performing her short program at the 2026 World Figure Skating Championships

On February 17, Shin competed in the individual women's event short program, placing fourteenth after falling on the second part of her triple Lutz-triple toe. "I’m a little bit disappointed, but I’m going to try to put it behind me and prepare as best as I can for the free skate," she said following her performance. "I was a bit more nervous today compared to the team competition." Two days later, Shin performed her free skate, where she skated cleanly apart from two-footing a planned triple loop. She ultimately placed seventh in that segment, earning a new personal best free skate score, and moving up to eleventh place overall. "From the beginning of the season as a senior, it wasn’t easy," Shin said in an interview following her performance. "But anyway, it is such an honor for me to be here at the Olympics. I’m very, very thankful. Of course, I do feel sorry about some things here, but overall I really tried to do my best and I don’t have any regrets."

The following month, Shin competed at the 2026 World Championships in Prague, Czech Republic, where she placed eighth overall in her debut at this event after finishing thirteenth in the short program and fourth in the free skate. "This was my first senior championship, so I learned many things," said Shin, "It was a great experience. I learned how to relax, to be less nervous, to focus more, and to have more mental control. Throughout the season, I saw a lot of senior skaters and how they control their minds, and that’s what I learned from."

=== 2026–27 season ===
Shin opened her season with a silver medal at the 2026 CS Lombardia Trophy. Subsequently, in October, Shin competed at the 2026 Skate Canada International. Placing sixth in the short program and third in the free skate, she ultimately finished in sixth place overall.

== Programs ==
Season	Short program	Free skating	Exhibition
2026–2027	Dona Nobis Pacem 2 (from The Leftovers) by Max Richter choreo. by Jeffrey Buttle	Yumeji's Theme; Efude (from In the Mood for Love/Yumeji) by Shigeru Umebayashi; Timelapse by Mari Samuelsen, Jesper Söderqvist, and Gunnar Flagstad choreo. by Shae-Lynn Bourne	Die on This Hill by Sienna Spiro choreo. by Cha Jun-hwan
2025–2026	Nocturne No. 20 in C-sharp minor by Frédéric Chopin choreo. by Jeffrey Buttle	Liebesträume No. 3 in A-Flat Minor by Franz Liszt performed by Lang Lang choreo. by David Wilson; Adagio of Spartacus and Phrygia (from Spartacus) by Aram Khachaturian choreo. by David Wilson	Bewitched by Laufey
2024–2025	Adiós Nonino by Astor Piazzolla choreo. by David Wilson	Liebesträume No. 3 in A-Flat Minor by Franz Liszt performed by Lang Lang choreo. by David Wilson; Daphnis et Chloé by Maurice Ravel choreo. by Lori Nichol	
2023–2024	Fascination Waltz (from Love in the Afternoon) by Fermo Dante Marchetti performed by André Rieu choreo. by David Wilson	Not About Angels (from The Fault in Our Stars) by Birdy; Portion of Eternity by Karl Hugo choreo. by David Wilson	Roxanne (Dark Eyes) performed by Iwao Furusawa choreo. by Akiko Suzuki; The Giving by Michael W. Smith choreo. by Shin Yea-ji
2022–2023	The Giving by Michael W. Smith choreo. by Shin Yea-ji	Tree of Life Suite by Roberto Cacciapaglia choreo. by Shin Yea-ji	Jumpin' Jack by Big Bad Voodoo Daddy choreo. by Shin Yea-ji
2021–2022	La Bohème by Charles Aznavour, Jacques Plante performed by Sergei Trofanov choreo. by Shin Yea-ji	Love Me If You Dare by Philippe Rombi choreo. by Shin Yea-ji	
2020–2021	Nessun dorma (from Turandot) by Giacomo Puccini performed by HAUSER choreo. by Shin Yea-ji	Love Me If You Dare by Philippe Rombi choreo. by Shin Yea-ji	
2019–2020	Jumpin' Jack by Big Bad Voodoo Daddy choreo. by Shin Yea-ji	Miss Peregrine's Home for Peculiar Children: Go to Her by Mike Higham & Matthew Margeson; New World Coming by Benjamin Wallfisch & DíSA choreo. by Shin Yea-ji	
2018–2019	Sway performed by The Pussycat Dolls choreo. by Shin Yea-ji	Hallelujah by Leonard Cohen performed by Lindsey Stirling choreo. by Shin Yea-ji	

== Competitive highlights ==
- GP – Event of the ISU Grand Prix Series
- JGP – Event of the ISU Junior Grand Prix Series
- CS – Event of the ISU Challenger Series
- TBD – Assigned
- WD – Withdrew from competition
- Medals at team events are awarded for the team results only. Individual placements at team events are listed in parentheses.

Competition placements at senior level
Season	2021–22	2022–23	2023–24	2024–25	2025–26	2026–27
Winter Olympics					11th	
Winter Olympics (Team event)					7th	
World Championships					8th	
Four Continents Championships					6th	
South Korean Championships	4th	1st	1st	2nd	1st	
GP Cup of China					5th	
GP France					7th	
GP NHK Trophy						TBD
GP Skate Canada						6th
CS Cranberry Cup					3rd	
CS Nebelhorn Trophy					3rd	
CS Lombardia Trophy						2nd

Competition placements at junior level
Season	2020–21	2021–22	2022–23	2023–24	2024–25
Winter Youth Olympics				2nd	
Winter Youth Olympics (Team event)				1st	
World Junior Championships		2nd	2nd	2nd	2nd
Junior Grand Prix Final			2nd	2nd	
South Korean Championships	1st				
JGP Austria				1st	
JGP Hungary				1st	
JGP Latvia			1st		
JGP Poland		3rd	2nd		
JGP Slovenia		6th			2nd
JGP Thailand					4th

== Detailed results ==
ISU personal best scores in the +5/-5 GOE System
Segment	Type	Score	Event
Total	**TSS**	**212.43**	2024 World Junior Championships
Short program	**TSS**	**74.93**	2026 CS Lombardia Trophy
Short program	TES	42.88	2026 CS Lombardia Trophy
Short program	PCS	33.85	2025 CS Nebelhorn Trophy
Free skating	**TSS**	**141.02**	2026 Winter Olympics
Free skating	TES	75.05	2026 Winter Olympics
Free skating	PCS	67.81	2025 CS Nebelhorn Trophy

=== Senior results ===
- Small medals for the short program and free skating are only awarded at ISU Championships.
- Medals at team events are awarded for the team results only. Individual placements at team events are listed in parentheses.
- ISU Personal Bests highlighted in **bold**.

Results in the 2025–26 season
Date	Event	SP		FS		Total	
Date	Event	P	Score	P	Score	P	Score
Aug 7–10, 2025	(United States) 2025 CS Cranberry Cup International	3	62.12	3	117.85	3	179.97
Sep 25–27, 2025	(Germany) 2025 CS Nebelhorn Trophy	1	74.47	4	133.98	3	208.45
Oct 17–19, 2025	2025 Grand Prix de France	8	59.23	7	123.10	7	182.33
Oct 24–26, 2025	2025 Cup of China	4	68.01	4	127.42	5	195.43
Jan 3–6, 2026	(South Korea) 2026 South Korean Championships	1	74.43	1	145.46	1	219.89
Jan 21–25, 2026	(China) 2026 Four Continents Championships	14	53.97	5	131.09	6	185.06
Feb 6–8, 2026	(Italy) 2026 Winter Olympics – Team event	4	68.80	—N/a	—N/a	7	—N/a
Feb 17–19, 2026	(Italy) 2026 Winter Olympics	14	65.66	7	**141.02**	11	206.68
Mar 24–29, 2026	(Czech Republic) 2026 World Championships	13	65.24	4	136.65	8	201.89

Results in the 2026–27 season
Date	Event	SP		FS		Total	
Date	Event	P	Score	P	Score	P	Score
Sep 17–20, 2026	(Italy) 2026 CS Lombardia Trophy	2	**74.93**	1	134.33	2	209.26
Oct 30 - Nov 1, 2026	2026 Skate Canada International	6	65.38	3	139.14	6	204.52

=== Junior results ===
Results in the 2020–21 season
Date	Event	SP		FS		Total	
Date	Event	P	Score	P	Score	P	Score
Feb 24 – 26, 2021	(South Korea) 2021 South Korean Championships (Junior)	1	55.90	3	91.59	1	147.49

Results in the 2021–22 season
Date	Event	SP		FS		Total	
Date	Event	P	Score	P	Score	P	Score
Sep 22 – 25, 2021	2021 JGP Slovenia	7	55.82	4	122.83	6	178.65
Sep 29 – Oct 2, 2021	2021 JGP Poland	2	67.28	3	116.13	3	183.41
Jan 7 – 9, 2022	(South Korea) 2022 South Korean Championships (Senior)	2	68.97	4	135.11	4	204.08
April 13 – 17, 2022	(Estonia) 2022 World Junior Championships	2	69.38	1	136.63	2	206.01

Results in the 2022–23 season
Date	Event	SP		FS		Total	
Date	Event	P	Score	P	Score	P	Score
Sep 7 – 10, 2022	2022 JGP Latvia	1	70.41	1	124.27	1	194.68
Oct 5 – 8, 2022	2021 JGP Poland II	3	63.72	2	130.97	2	194.69
Dec 8 – 11, 2022	(Italy) 2022-23 Junior Grand Prix Final	2	69.11	2	131.21	2	200.32
Jan 5 – 9, 2023	(South Korea) 2023 South Korean Championships (Senior)	2	70.95	1	142.06	1	213.01
Feb 27 – Mar 5, 2023	(Canada) 2023 World Junior Championships	2	71.19	2	130.71	2	201.90

Results in the 2023–24 season
Date	Event	SP		FS		Total	
Date	Event	P	Score	P	Score	P	Score
Aug 30 – Sep 2, 2023	2023 JGP Austria	1	70.38	1	130.95	1	201.33
Sep 20 – 23, 2023	2023 JGP Hungary	1	66.25	1	134.49	1	200.74
Dec 7 – 10, 2023	(China) 2023-24 Junior Grand Prix Final	1	69.08	2	131.67	2	200.75
Jan 4 – 7, 2024	(South Korea) 2024 South Korean Championships (Senior)	1	69.08	1	149.28	1	218.36
Jan 28– 30, 2018	(South Korea) 2024 Winter Youth Olympics	3	66.48	2	125.35	2	191.83
Feb 1, 2024	(South Korea) 2024 Winter Youth Olympics – Team event	—N/a	—N/a	1	137.48	1	—N/a
Feb 26 – Mar 3, 2024	(Taiwan) 2024 World Junior Championships	1	73.47	2	138.95	2	**212.43**

Results in the 2024–25 season
Date	Event	SP		FS		Total	
Date	Event	P	Score	P	Score	P	Score
Sep 11 – 14, 2024	2024 JGP Thailand	6	54.89	3	119.10	4	173.99
Oct 2 – 5, 2024	2024 JGP Slovenia	1	69.24	2	123.80	2	193.04
Jan 2 – 5, 2025	(South Korea) 2025 South Korean Championships (Senior)	1	72.08	2	142.07	2	214.15
Feb 25 – Mar 2, 2025	(Hungary) 2025 World Junior Championships	7	63.57	2	126.96	2	190.53
