= Figure skating at the 2024 Winter Youth Olympics – Team event =

Team Event at the IV Winter Youth Olympic Games
- Venue: Gangneung Ice Arena
- Dates: 1 February
- Competitors: 27 from 5 nations

Medalists
1st place, gold medalist(s)		Kim Hyun-gyeom; Shin Ji-a; Kim Jin-ny; Lee Na-mu	South Korea
2nd place, silver medalist(s)		Jacob Sanchez; Sherry Zhang; Cayla Smith; Jared McPike; Olivia Ilin; Dylan Cain	United States
3rd place, bronze medalist(s)		David Li; Kaiya Ruiter; Annika Behnke; Kole Sauve; Audra Gans; Michael Boutsan	Canada

The team event figure skating competition of the 2024 Winter Youth Olympics will be held at the Gangneung Ice Arena on 1 February 2024. The five teams were composed of the countries' skaters for the other figure skating events, each performing a free program or free dance.

This will be the first time the team event at the Winter Youth Olympics will not have the mixed NOC teams.

== Teams ==
The entries were published by the International Skating Union on January 25, 2024.

Team	Men	Women	Pairs	Ice dance
Canada	David Li	Kaiya Ruiter	Annika Behnke / Kole Sauve	Audra Gans / Michael Boutsan
China	Tian Tonghe	Gao Shiqi		Liu Tong / Ge Quanshuo
France	Gianni Motilla	Eve Dubecq		Ambre Perrier-Gianesini / Samuel Blanc-Klaperman
South Korea	Kim Hyun-gyeom	Shin Ji-a		Kim Jin-ny / Lee Na-mu
United States	Jacob Sanchez	Sherry Zhang	Cayla Smith / Jared McPike	Olivia Ilin / Dylan Cain

== Results ==
Note: Points between brackets ("[]") are placement points who are not counted. As only the United States and Canada could choose which results would be discarded from the dispute.

Pl.	Name	Men	Women	Pair	Ice Dance	Total points
1st place, gold medalist(s)	South Korea	5	5	–	3	13
2nd place, silver medalist(s)	United States	4	4	[4]	4	12
3rd place, bronze medalist(s)	Canada	2	2	5	[1]	9
4	China	3	3	–	2	8
5	France	1	1	–	5	7

== Detailed results ==
=== Men ===
Rank	Name	Team	TSS	TES	PCS	CO	PR	SK	Ded	StN	Points
1	Kim Hyun-gyeom	South Korea	136.38	70.18	67.20	6.64	6.61	6.93	1.00	5	5
2	Jacob Sanchez	United States	129.77	63.25	67.52	6.71	6.68	6.89	1.00	4	4
3	Tian Tonghe	China	125.12	63.78	61.34	6.07	5.96	6.39	0.00	3	3
4	David Li	Canada	116.61	56.11	1.50	6.18	6.04	6.25	1.00	2	2
5	Gianni Motilla	France	94.10	44.68	50.42	5.14	4.75	5.25	1.00	1	1

=== Women ===
Rank	Name	Team	TSS	TES	PCS	CO	PR	SK	Ded	StN	Points
1	Shin Ji-a	South Korea	137.48	74.44	63.04	7.86	7.79	7.96	0.00	5	5
2	Sherry Zhang	United States	122.76	66.21	56.55	6.86	7.00	7.32	0.00	4	4
3	Gao Shiqi	China	118.31	63.95	54.36	6.61	6.75	7.00	0.00	3	3
4	Kaiya Ruiter	Canada	103.41	49.35	54.06	6.75	6.75	6.75	0.00	2	2
5	Eve Dubecq	France	87.70	46.38	42.32	5.21	5.18	5.46	1.00	1	1

=== Pairs ===
Rank	Name	Team	TSS	TES	PCS	CO	PR	SK	Ded	StN	Points
1	Annika Behnke / Kole Sauve	Canada	82.39	42.52	39.87	5.00	4.89	5.04	0.00	2	5
2	Cayla Smith / Jared McPike	United States	63.55	27.72	35.83	4.57	4.46	4.39	0.00	1	4

=== Ice dance ===
Rank	Name	Team	TSS	TES	PCS	CO	PR	SK	Ded	StN	Points
1	Ambre Perrier-Gianesini / Samuel Blanc-Klaperman	France	97.69	53.97	43.72	7.32	7.29	7.25	0.00	5	5
2	Olivia Ilin / Dylan Cain	United States	88.63	49.49	39.14	6.64	6.57	6.36	0.00	4	4
3	Kim Jin-ny / Lee Na-mu	South Korea	82.15	44.37	37.78	6.36	6.39	6.14	0.00	3	3
4	Liu Tong / Ge Quanshuo	China	80.42	45.36	35.06	5.82	5.82	5.89	0.00	1	2
5	Audra Gans / Michael Boutsan	Canada	80.24	43.74	36.50	6.11	6.07	6.07	0.00	2	1
