= Figure skating at the 2024 Winter Youth Olympics – Men's singles =

Men's singles at the IV Winter Youth Olympic Games
- Venue: Gangneung Ice Arena
- Dates: 27, 29 January
- Competitors: 18 from 16 nations

Medalists
1st place, gold medalist(s)		Kim Hyun-gyeom	South Korea
2nd place, silver medalist(s)		Adam Hagara	Slovakia
3rd place, bronze medalist(s)		Li Yanhao	New Zealand

The men's singles competition of the 2024 Winter Youth Olympics was held at the Gangneung Ice Arena on 27 January (short program) and 29 January 2024 (free skating).

== Results ==
=== Short program ===
The short program was held on 27 January at 16:00.

Pl.	Name	Nation	TSS	TES	PCS	CO	PR	SK	Ded	StN
1	Jacob Sanchez	United States	76.38	40.47	35.91	7.07	7.18	7.25	0.00	10
2	Adam Hagara	Slovakia	75.06	40.71	34.35	6.89	6.75	6.93	0.00	17
3	Kim Hyun-gyeom	South Korea	69.28	35.91	34.37	6.79	6.79	7.00	-1.00	16
4	Li Yanhao	New Zealand	68.01	33.96	34.05	6.64	6.93	6.82	0.00	15
5	Tian Tonghe	China	67.08	35.94	31.14	6.18	6.11	6.36	0.00	8
6	Raffaele Francesco Zich	Italy	66.05	32.77	33.28	6.64	6.54	6.75	0.00	12
7	Georgii Pavlov	Switzerland	61.97	32.93	29.04	5.93	5.75	5.71	0.00	3
8	Haru Kakiuchi	Japan	61.11	29.20	31.91	6.36	6.21	6.54	0.00	14
9	Tao MacRae	Great Britain	59.49	31.75	27.74	5.50	5.54	5.57	0.00	1
10	Konstantin Supatashvili	Georgia	58.48	31.56	27.92	5.61	5.57	5.54	-1.00	13
11	David Li	Canada	57.16	28.79	31.37	6.29	6.11	6.39	-3.00	11
12	Aurélian Chervet	Switzerland	56.55	30.31	26.24	5.29	5.14	5.29	0.00	5
13	Rio Nakata	Japan	55.59	25.40	31.19	6.11	5.93	6.64	-1.00	18
14	Vadym Novikov	Ukraine	54.91	27.18	27.73	5.46	5.43	5.71	0.00	9
15	Elias Sayed	Sweden	54.57	29.08	26.49	5.29	5.29	5.29	-1.00	7
16	Kirills Korkačs	Latvia	53.36	27.88	25.48	5.11	5.11	5.04	0.00	4
17	Gianni Motilla	France	51.79	26.30	26.49	5.36	5.04	5.46	-1.00	6
18	Jegor Martsenko	Estonia	47.89	22.33	25.56	5.14	4.96	5.21	0.00	2

=== Free skating ===
The free skating was held on 29 January at 14:00.

Pl.	Name	Nation	TSS	TES	PCS	CO	PR	SK	Ded	StN
1	Kim Hyun-gyeom	South Korea	147.45	77.29	70.16	7.00	7.00	7.07	0.00	16
2	Rio Nakata	Japan	142.70	74.56	68.14	6.82	6.50	7.14	0.00	2
3	Adam Hagara	Slovakia	141.17	72.44	68.73	6.82	6.82	7.00	0.00	17
4	Li Yanhao	New Zealand	140.83	70.53	70.30	6.93	7.00	7.18	0.00	14
5	Haru Kakiuchi	Japan	124.77	62.70	62.07	6.14	6.07	6.43	0.00	11
6	Jacob Sanchez	United States	123.90	55.86	68.04	6.75	6.75	6.93	0.00	18
7	Raffaele Francesco Zich	Italy	123.79	54.83	68.96	6.89	6.93	6.89	0.00	15
8	David Li	Canada	118.57	56.26	62.31	6.18	6.32	6.21	0.00	8
9	Georgii Pavlov	Switzerland	116.85	58.48	58.37	5.75	5.89	5.89	0.00	12
10	Konstantin Supatashvili	Georgia	116.25	61.24	56.01	5.54	5.57	5.71	-1.00	9
11	Tian Tonghe	China	112.24	53.34	59.90	5.89	5.89	6.21	-1.00	13
12	Tao MacRae	Great Britain	112.12	54.55	57.57	5.68	5.86	5.75	0.00	10
13	Aurélian Chervet	Switzerland	109.00	51.89	57.11	5.75	5.86	5.54	0.00	7
14	Vadym Novikov	Ukraine	105.73	53.78	51.95	5.18	4.96	5.46	0.00	3
15	Gianni Motilla	France	104.47	53.09	51.38	5.18	5.04	5.21	0.00	4
16	Elias Sayed	Sweden	95.57	46.55	49.02	4.93	4.75	5.04	0.00	1
17	Kirills Korkačs	Latvia	91.07	45.05	46.02	4.61	4.57	4.64	0.00	5
18	Jegor Martsenko	Estonia	87.58	41.10	47.48	4.79	4.68	4.79	-1.00	6

=== Overall ===
Rank	Name	Nation	Total points	SP		FS	
1	Kim Hyun-gyeom	South Korea	216.73	3	69.28	1	147.45
2	Adam Hagara	Slovakia	216.23	2	75.06	3	141.17
3	Li Yanhao	New Zealand	208.84	4	68.01	4	140.83
4	Jacob Sanchez	United States	200.28	1	76.38	6	123.90
5	Rio Nakata	Japan	198.29	13	55.59	2	142.70
6	Raffaele Francesco Zich	Italy	189.84	6	66.05	7	123.79
7	Haru Kakiuchi	Japan	185.88	8	61.11	5	124.77
8	Tian Tonghe	China	179.32	5	67.08	11	112.24
9	Georgii Pavlov	Switzerland	178.82	7	61.97	9	116.85
10	David Li	Canada	175.73	11	57.16	8	118.57
11	Konstantin Supatashvili	Georgia	174.73	10	58.48	10	116.25
12	Tao MacRae	Great Britain	171.61	9	59.49	12	112.12
13	Aurélian Chervet	Switzerland	165.55	12	56.55	13	109.00
14	Vadym Novikov	Ukraine	160.64	14	54.91	14	105.73
15	Gianni Motilla	France	156.26	17	51.79	15	104.47
16	Elias Sayed	Sweden	150.14	15	54.57	16	95.57
17	Kirills Korkačs	Latvia	144.43	16	53.36	17	91.07
18	Jegor Martsenko	Estonia	135.47	18	47.89	18	87.58
