= 2026 World Figure Skating Championships =

International figure skating competition

- Type: ISU Championship
- Date: 25 – 29 March
- Season: 2025–26
- Location: Prague, Czech Republic
- Host: Czech Figure Skating Association
- Venue: O2 Arena

Champions
- Men's singles: (United States) Ilia Malinin
- Women's singles: (Japan) Kaori Sakamoto
- Pairs: (Germany) Minerva Fabienne Hase and Nikita Volodin
- Ice dance: (France) Laurence Fournier Beaudry and Guillaume Cizeron
- Previous: 2025 World Championships
- Next: 2027 World Championships

The 2026 World Figure Skating Championships were held from 25 to 29 March at the O2 Arena in Prague, Czech Republic. Sanctioned by the International Skating Union (ISU), the World Championships are considered the most prestigious event in figure skating. Medals were awarded in men's singles, women's singles, pair skating, and ice dance. Ilia Malinin of the United States won the men's event, Kaori Sakamoto of Japan won the women's event, Minerva Fabienne Hase and Nikita Volodin of Germany won the pairs event, and Laurence Fournier Beaudry and Guillaume Cizeron of France won the ice dance event.

== Background ==
The World Figure Skating Championships are considered the most prestigious event in figure skating. The 2026 World Championships were held from 25 to 29 March at the O2 Arena in Prague, Czech Republic.

== Qualification ==
The number of entries from each nation for the 2026 World Championships is based on the results of the 2025 World Championships. These nations were eligible to enter more than one skater or team in the indicated disciplines. Skaters from Russia and Belarus were banned from participating "until further notice" due to the 2022 Russian invasion of Ukraine.

Number of entries per discipline
Spots	Men	Women	Pairs	Ice dance
3	France; Japan; Kazakhstan; United States	Japan; United States	United States	Canada; United States
2	Georgia; Italy; Latvia; South Korea	Belgium; Estonia; South Korea; Switzerland	Australia; Canada; Georgia; Germany; Hungary; Italy; Japan; Uzbekistan	Czech Republic; Finland; France; Georgia; Great Britain; Italy; Spain

== Changes to preliminary entries ==
The International Skating Union published the initial list of entrants on 25 February 2026.

Date	Discipline	Withdrew	Added	Notes	Ref.
26 February	Women	(Belgium); Loena Hendrickx	(Belgium); Jade Hovine	Injury	
27 February	Pairs	(Japan); Riku Miura; Ryuichi Kihara	—N/a	Short turnaround time from the Olympics	
27 February	Ice dance	—N/a	(Italy); Giulia Isabella Paolino; Andrea Tuba	The Italian Ice Sports Federation entered only one ice dance couple despite qualifying two spots.	
6 March	Pairs	(Italy); Sara Conti; Niccolò Macii	—N/a		
7 March	Women	(United States); Alysa Liu	(United States); Sarah Everhardt	Insufficient time post-Olympics to prepare	
9 March	Ice dance	(United States); Madison Chock; Evan Bates	(United States); Caroline Green; Michael Parsons	Decided to end season with their Olympic performance	
10 March	Men	(Italy); Matteo Rizzo	(Italy); Gabriele Frangipani	—N/a	
13 March	Women	(Switzerland); Kimmy Repond	—N/a	Injury	
13 March	Ice dance	(Spain); Sofía Val; Asaf Kazimov	—N/a	Surgery (Kazimov)	
16 March	Pairs	(United States); Ellie Kam; Daniel O'Shea	(United States); Emily Chan; Spencer Akira Howe	Injury	
18 March	Men	(South Korea); Cha Jun-hwan	(South Korea); Cha Young-hyun	Injury	
18 March	Women	(Israel); Mariia Seniuk	—N/a		
20 March	Pairs	(Australia); Anastasiia Golubeva; Hektor Giotopoulos Moore	—N/a		
21 March	Men	(United States); Jason Brown	(United States); Jacob Sanchez	—N/a	

== Required performance elements ==
=== Single skating ===
Women competing in single skating performed their short programs on 25 March, while men performed theirs on 26 March. Lasting 2 minutes 40 seconds (+/− 10 seconds), the short program had to include the following elements:

For men: one double or triple Axel; one triple or quadruple jump; one jump combination consisting of a double jump and a triple jump, two triple jumps, or a quadruple jump and a double jump or triple jump; one flying spin; one camel spin or sit spin with a change of foot; one spin combination with a change of foot; and a step sequence using the full ice surface.

For women: one double or triple Axel; one triple jump; one jump combination consisting of a double jump and a triple jump, or two triple jumps; one flying spin; one layback spin, sideways leaning spin, camel spin, or sit spin without a change of foot; one spin combination with a change of foot; and one step sequence using the full ice surface.

Women performed their free skates on 27 March, while men performed theirs on 28 March. Lasting 4 minutes (+/− 10 seconds), the free skate for both men and women had to include the following: seven jump elements, of which one had to be an Axel-type jump; three spins, of which one had to be a spin combination, one a flying spin, and one a spin with only one position; a step sequence; and a choreographic sequence.

=== Pairs ===
Couples competing in pair skating performed their short programs on 25 March. Lasting 2 minutes 40 seconds (+/− 10 seconds), the short program had to include the following elements: one pair lift, one double or triple twist lift, one double or triple throw jump, one double or triple solo jump, one solo spin combination with a change of foot, one death spiral, and a step sequence using the full ice surface.

Couples performed their free skates on 25 March. Lasting 4 minutes (+/− 10 seconds), the free skate had to include the following: three pair lifts, of which one had to be a twist lift; two different throw jumps; one solo jump; one jump combination or sequence; one pair spin combination; one death spiral; and a choreographic sequence.

=== Ice dance ===
Couples competing in ice dance performed their rhythm dances on 27 March. Lasting 2 minutes 40 seconds (+/− 10 seconds), the theme of the rhythm dance this season was "music, dance styles, and feeling of the 1990s". Examples of applicable dance styles and music included pop, Latin, house, techno, hip-hop, and grunge. The rhythm dance had to include the following elements: one pattern dance step sequence, one choreographic rhythm sequence, one dance lift, one set of sequential twizzles, and one step sequence.

Couples then performed their free dances on 28 March. Lasting 4 minutes (+/− 10 seconds), the free dance had to include the following: three dance lifts, one dance spin, one set of synchronized twizzles, one step sequence in hold, one step sequence while on one skate and not touching, and three choreographic elements.

== Judging ==
Skaters were judged according to the required technical elements of their program (such as jumps and spins), as well as the overall presentation of their program, based on three program components (skating skills, presentation, and composition). Each technical element in a figure skating performance was assigned a predetermined base point value and scored by a panel of nine judges on a scale from −5 to +5 based on the quality of its execution. Each Grade of Execution (GOE) from –5 to +5 was assigned a value as indicated on the Scale of Values. For example, a triple Axel was worth a base value of 8.00 points, and a GOE of +3 was worth 2.40 points, so a triple Axel with a GOE of +3 earned 10.40 points. The judging panel's GOE for each element was determined by calculating the trimmed mean (the average after discarding the highest and lowest scores). The panel's scores for all elements were added together to generate a Total Elements Score. At the same time, the judges evaluated each performance based on the five aforementioned program components and assigned each a score from 0.25 to 10 in 0.25-point increments. The judging panel's final score for each program component was also determined by calculating the trimmed mean. Those scores were then multiplied by the factor shown on the chart below; the results were added together to generate a total Program Component Score.

Program component factoring
Discipline	Short program or rhythm dance	Free skate or free dance
Men	1.67	3.33
Women	1.33	2.67
Pairs	1.33	2.67
Ice dance	1.33	2.00

Deductions were applied for certain violations, such as time infractions, stops and restarts, or falls. The Total Elements Score and Program Component Score were then added together, minus any deductions, to generate a final performance score for each skater or team.

== Medal summary ==
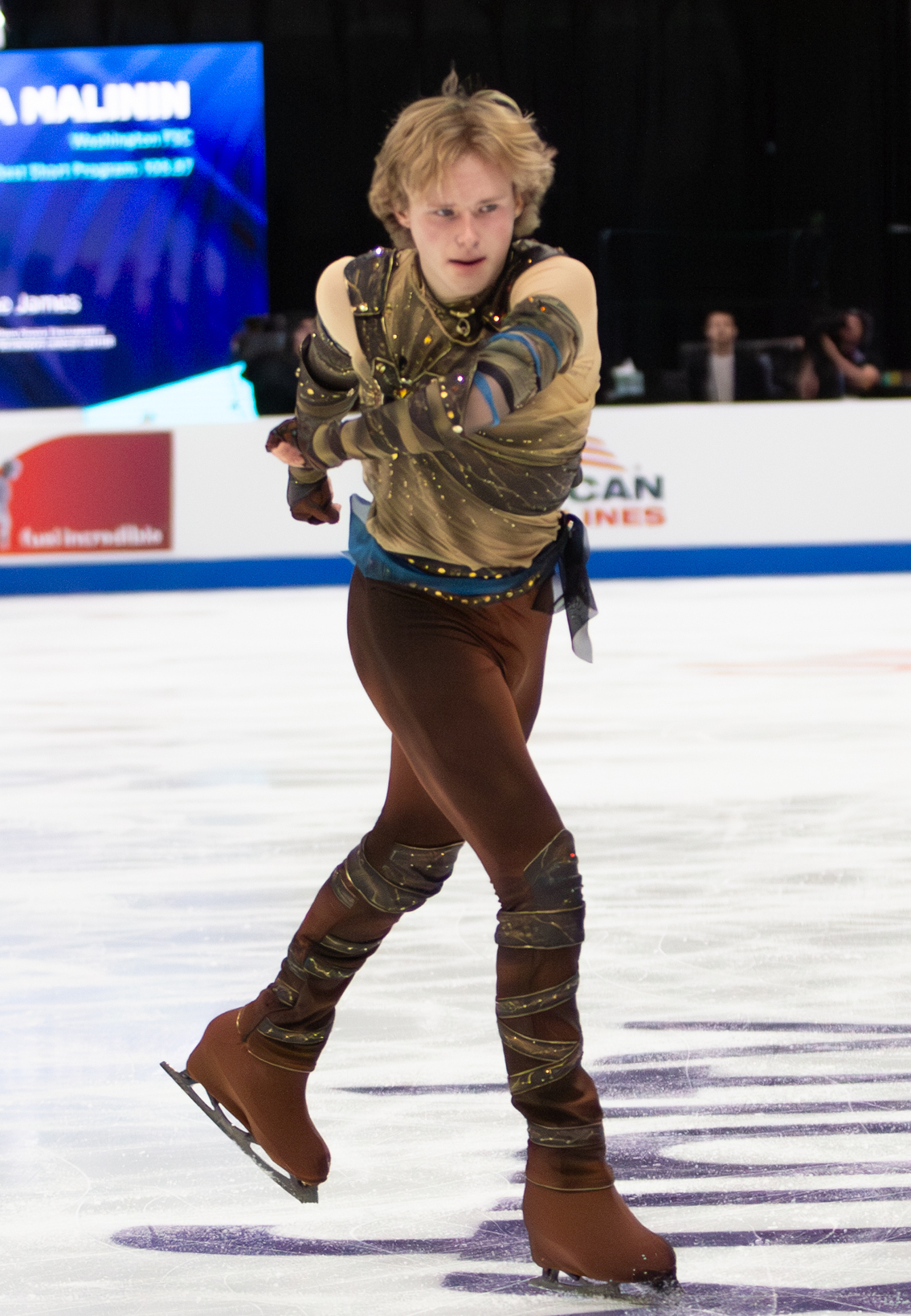
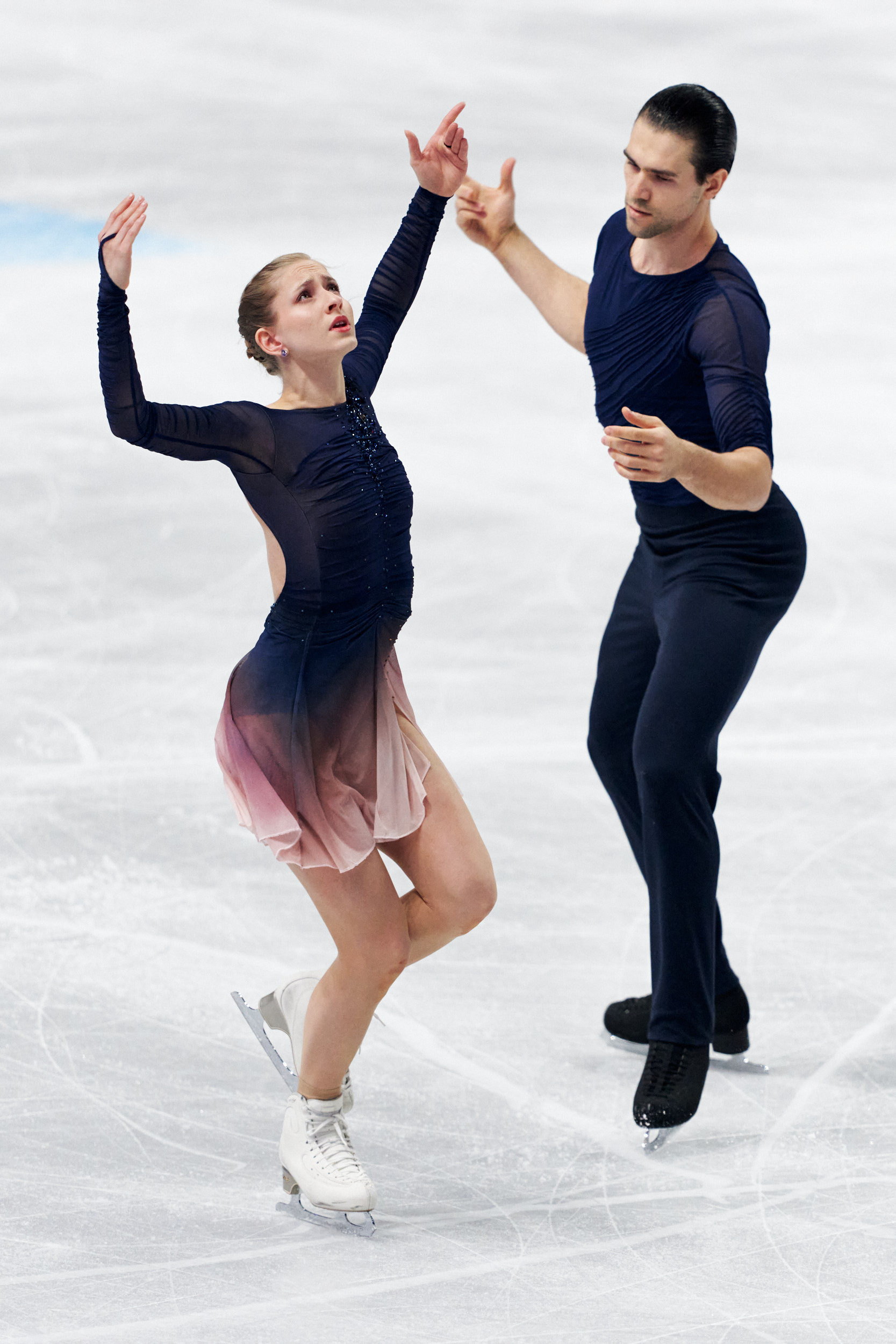
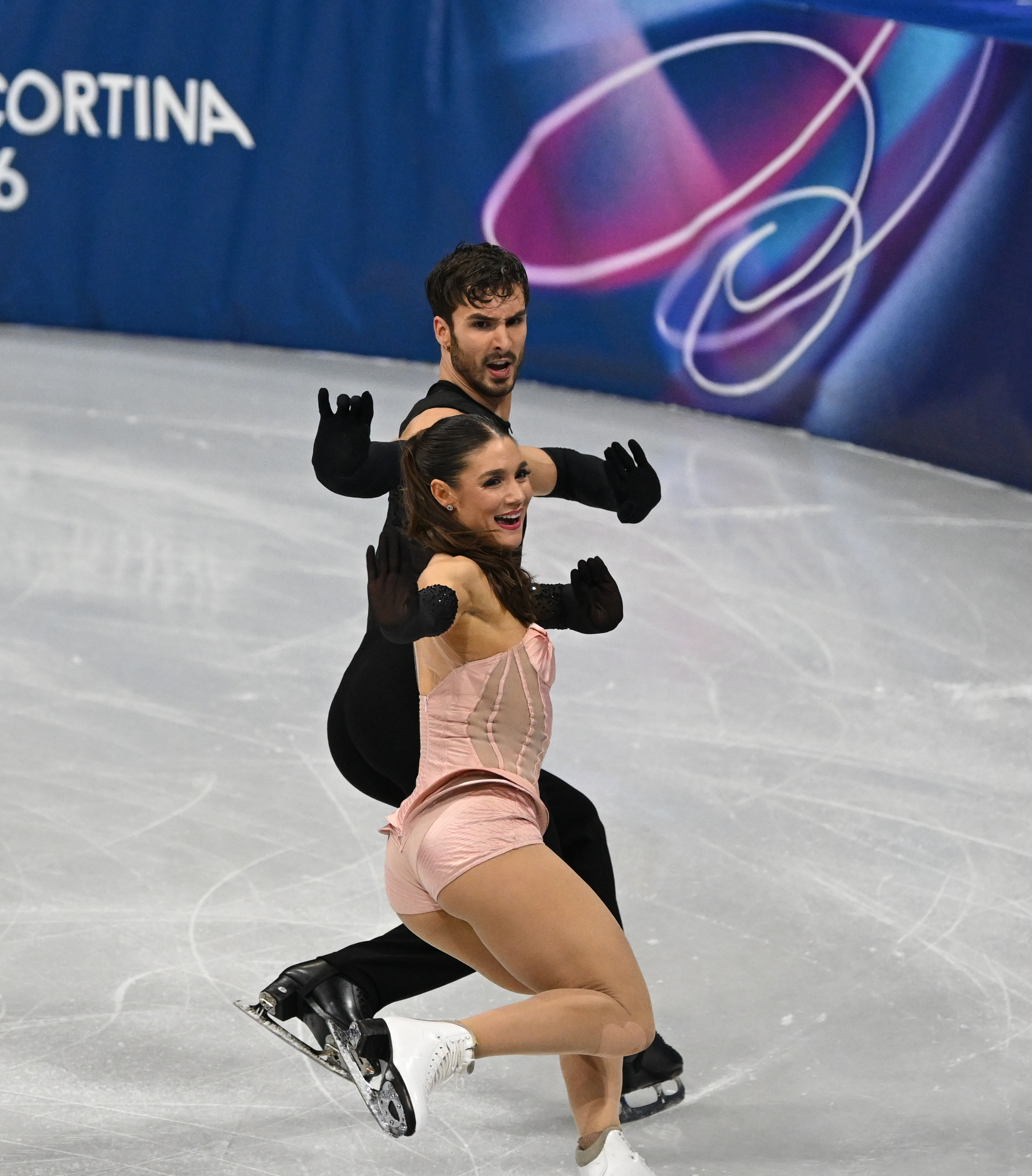
The 2026 World Champions (from left to right):
Ilia Malinin of the United States (men's singles); Kaori Sakamoto of Japan (women's singles); Minerva Fabienne Hase and Nikita Volodin of Germany (pair skating); and Laurence Fournier Beaudry and Guillaume Cizeron of France (ice dance)

=== Medalists ===
Medals are awarded to the skaters or teams who achieved the highest overall placements in each discipline.

Medal recipients
Discipline	Gold	Silver	Bronze
Men	(United States) Ilia Malinin	(Japan) Yuma Kagiyama	(Japan) Shun Sato
Women	(Japan); Kaori Sakamoto	(Japan); Mone Chiba	(Belgium); Nina Pinzarrone
Pairs	(Germany); Minerva Fabienne Hase; Nikita Volodin	(Georgia (country)); Anastasiia Metelkina; Luka Berulava	(Canada); Lia Pereira; Trennt Michaud
Ice dance	(France); Laurence Fournier Beaudry; Guillaume Cizeron	(Canada); Piper Gilles; Paul Poirier	(United States); Emilea Zingas; Vadym Kolesnik

Small medals are awarded to the skaters or teams who achieved the highest short program or rhythm dance placements in each discipline.

Small medal recipients for highest short program or rhythm dance
Discipline	Gold	Silver	Bronze
Men	(United States) Ilia Malinin	(France) Adam Siao Him Fa	(Estonia) Aleksandr Selevko
Women	(Japan) Kaori Sakamoto	(Japan) Mone Chiba	(United States) Amber Glenn
Pairs	(Germany); Minerva Fabienne Hase; Nikita Volodin	(Georgia (country)); Anastasiia Metelkina; Luka Berulava	(Canada); Lia Pereira; Trennt Michaud
Ice dance	(France); Laurence Fournier Beaudry; Guillaume Cizeron	(Canada); Piper Gilles; Paul Poirier	(United Kingdom); Lilah Fear; Lewis Gibson

Small medals are awarded to the skaters or teams who achieved the highest free skate or free dance placements in each discipline.

Small medal recipients for highest free skate or free dance
Discipline	Gold	Silver	Bronze
Men	(United States) Ilia Malinin	(Japan) Yuma Kagiyama	(Japan) Shun Sato
Women	(Japan); Kaori Sakamoto	(Japan); Mone Chiba	(Belgium); Nina Pinzarrone
Pairs	(Germany); Minerva Fabienne Hase; Nikita Volodin	(Canada); Lia Pereira; Trennt Michaud	(Japan); Yuna Nagaoka; Sumitada Moriguchi
Ice dance	(France); Laurence Fournier Beaudry; Guillaume Cizeron	(Spain); Olivia Smart; Tim Dieck	(Canada); Piper Gilles; Paul Poirier

=== Medals by country ===
Table of medals for overall placement:

Rank	Nation	Gold	Silver	Bronze	Total
1	Japan	1	2	1	4
2	United States	1	0	1	2
3	France	1	0	0	1
3	Germany	1	0	0	1
5	Canada	0	1	1	2
6	Georgia	0	1	0	1
7	Belgium	0	0	1	1
Totals (7 entries)		4	4	4	12

== Results ==
=== Men's singles ===
Men's results
Rank	Skater	Nation	Total	SP		FS	
1st place, gold medalist(s)	Ilia Malinin	United States	329.40	1	111.29	1	218.11
2nd place, silver medalist(s)	Yuma Kagiyama	Japan	306.67	6	93.80	2	212.87
3rd place, bronze medalist(s)	Shun Sato	Japan	288.54	4	95.84	3	192.70
4	Stephen Gogolev	Canada	281.04	5	94.38	4	186.66
5	Adam Siao Him Fa	France	271.56	2	101.85	8	169.71
6	Aleksandr Selevko	Estonia	270.42	3	96.49	6	173.93
7	Kévin Aymoz	France	269.13	11	84.74	5	184.39
8	Daniel Grassl	Italy	254.94	8	88.53	9	166.41
9	Lukas Britschgi	Switzerland	251.90	9	88.30	10	163.60
10	Andrew Torgashev	United States	249.41	7	89.07	11	160.34
11	Nika Egadze	Georgia	248.62	15	78.84	7	169.78
12	Jacob Sanchez	United States	241.74	10	85.15	12	156.59
13	Kyrylo Marsak	Ukraine	234.67	12	83.36	16	151.31
14	Vladimir Samoilov	Poland	233.41	16	77.98	13	155.43
15	Adam Hagara	Slovakia	230.29	18	76.75	14	153.54
16	Chen Yudong	China	225.02	22	74.36	17	150.66
17	Andreas Nordebäck	Sweden	224.66	24	72.59	15	152.07
18	Tamir Kuperman	Israel	224.40	19	76.63	18	147.77
19	Donovan Carrillo	Mexico	219.74	14	79.65	20	140.09
20	François Pitot	France	218.75	21	74.61	19	144.14
21	Deniss Vasiļjevs	Latvia	211.54	13	82.27	23	129.27
22	Georgii Reshtenko	Czech Republic	207.16	20	75.14	21	132.02
23	Gabriele Frangipani	Italy	207.07	17	76.89	22	130.18
24	Genrikh Gartung	Germany	192.31	23	73.20	24	119.11
25	Kao Miura	Japan	71.05	25	71.05	Did not advance to free skate	
26	Semen Daniliants	Armenia	70.94	26	70.94	Did not advance to free skate	
27	Cha Young-hyun	South Korea	70.92	27	70.92	Did not advance to free skate	
28	Kim Hyun-gyeom	South Korea	70.71	28	70.71	Did not advance to free skate	
29	Tomàs-Llorenç Guarino Sabaté	Spain	69.12	29	69.12	Did not advance to free skate	
30	Maurizio Zandron	Austria	67.82	30	67.82	Did not advance to free skate	
31	Vladimir Litvintsev	Azerbaijan	65.10	31	65.10	Did not advance to free skate	
32	Li Yu-Hsiang	Chinese Taipei	64.74	32	64.74	Did not advance to free skate	
33	Edward Appleby	Great Britain	64.30	33	64.30	Did not advance to free skate	
34	Alp Eren Özkan	Turkey	60.10	34	60.10	Did not advance to free skate	
35	Dias Jirenbayev	Kazakhstan	59.34	35	59.34	Did not advance to free skate	
36	Fedirs Kuļišs	Latvia	56.85	36	56.85	Did not advance to free skate	

=== Women's singles ===
Women's results
Rank	Skater	Nation	Total	SP		FS	
1st place, gold medalist(s)	Kaori Sakamoto	Japan	238.28	1	79.31	1	158.97
2nd place, silver medalist(s)	Mone Chiba	Japan	228.47	2	78.45	2	150.02
3rd place, bronze medalist(s)	Nina Pinzarrone	Belgium	215.20	5	71.82	3	143.38
4	Isabeau Levito	United States	206.99	4	72.16	7	134.83
5	Lara Naki Gutmann	Italy	205.12	7	69.33	5	135.79
6	Amber Glenn	United States	203.12	3	72.65	9	130.47
7	Niina Petrõkina	Estonia	202.27	11	67.29	6	134.98
8	Shin Ji-a	South Korea	201.89	13	65.24	4	136.65
9	Ami Nakai	Japan	200.00	8	69.10	8	130.90
10	Anastasiia Gubanova	Georgia	198.81	6	69.92	10	128.89
11	Sarah Everhardt	United States	197.43	9	68.74	11	128.69
12	Sofia Samodelkina	Kazakhstan	187.53	12	66.95	12	120.58
13	Lee Hae-in	South Korea	185.18	10	68.50	16	116.68
14	Iida Karhunen	Finland	181.44	14	61.40	13	120.04
15	Madeline Schizas	Canada	178.29	15	61.35	15	116.94
16	Zhang Ruiyang	China	178.13	18	58.96	14	119.17
17	Olga Mikutina	Austria	169.84	16	60.11	17	109.73
18	Lorine Schild	France	165.23	17	59.14	20	106.09
19	Ekaterina Kurakova	Poland	164.54	19	58.10	19	106.44
20	Nataly Langerbaur	Estonia	162.18	21	56.56	21	105.62
21	Livia Kaiser	Switzerland	159.58	22	54.91	22	104.67
22	Julia Sauter	Romania	159.51	23	52.67	18	106.84
23	Alexandra Feigin	Bulgaria	155.36	20	58.05	23	97.31
24	Barbora Vránková	Czech Republic	142.66	24	50.59	24	92.07
25	Anastasia Gracheva	Moldova	49.91	25	49.91	Did not advance to free skate	
26	Kristen Spours	Great Britain	49.20	26	49.20	Did not advance to free skate	
27	Nargiz Süleymanova	Azerbaijan	49.00	27	49.00	Did not advance to free skate	
28	Niki Wories	Netherlands	48.41	28	48.41	Did not advance to free skate	
29	Julija Lovrenčič	Slovenia	47.81	29	47.81	Did not advance to free skate	
30	Jade Hovine	Belgium	47.05	30	47.05	Did not advance to free skate	
31	Meda Variakojytė	Lithuania	45.47	31	45.47	Did not advance to free skate	
32	Mia Risa Gomez	Norway	42.51	32	42.51	Did not advance to free skate	
33	Stefania Yakovleva	Cyprus	38.53	33	38.53	Did not advance to free skate	

=== Pairs ===
Pairs' results
Rank	Skaters	Nation	Total	SP		FS	
1st place, gold medalist(s)	Minerva Fabienne Hase; Nikita Volodin	Germany	228.33	1	79.78	1	148.55
2nd place, silver medalist(s)	Anastasiia Metelkina; Luka Berulava	Georgia	218.41	2	79.45	4	138.96
3rd place, bronze medalist(s)	Lia Pereira; Trennt Michaud	Canada	216.09	3	75.52	2	140.57
4	Yuna Nagaoka; Sumitada Moriguchi	Japan	209.13	5	69.55	3	139.58
5	Maria Pavlova; Alexei Sviatchenko	Hungary	205.08	4	69.92	6	135.16
6	Alisa Efimova; Misha Mitrofanov	United States	202.51	7	67.29	5	135.22
7	Annika Hocke; Robert Kunkel	Germany	194.11	10	65.35	7	128.76
8	Karina Akopova; Nikita Rakhmanin	Armenia	190.46	8	67.12	9	123.34
9	Zhang Jiaxuan; Huang Yihang	China	184.90	14	62.69	10	122.21
10	Oxana Vouillamoz; Tom Bouvart	Switzerland	184.56	16	60.12	8	124.44
11	Ioulia Chtchetinina; Michał Woźniak	Poland	182.27	13	63.59	11	118.68
12	Katie McBeath; Daniil Parkman	United States	179.60	11	64.42	12	115.18
13	Anastasia Vaipan-Law; Luke Digby	Great Britain	176.33	9	66.34	15	109.99
14	Gabriella Izzo; Luc Maierhofer	Austria	170.61	19	58.22	14	112.39
15	Anna Valesi; Martin Bidař	Czech Republic	170.46	20	56.58	13	113.88
16	Emily Chan; Spencer Akira Howe	United States	169.91	6	69.02	20	100.89
17	Camille Kovalev; Pavel Kovalev	France	169.20	15	61.17	17	108.03
18	Sofiia Holichenko; Artem Darenskyi	Ukraine	168.28	17	58.85	16	109.43
19	Kelly Ann Laurin; Loucas Éthier	Canada	167.75	12	63.99	18	103.76
20	Irma Caldara; Riccardo Maglio	Italy	160.95	18	58.79	19	102.16
21	Daria Danilova; Michel Tsiba	Netherlands	48.77	21	48.77	Did not advance to free skate	

=== Ice dance ===
Ice dance results
Rank	Skaters	Nation	Total	RD		FD	
1st place, gold medalist(s)	Laurence Fournier Beaudry; Guillaume Cizeron	France	230.81	1	92.74	1	138.07
2nd place, silver medalist(s)	Piper Gilles; Paul Poirier	Canada	211.52	2	86.45	3	125.07
3rd place, bronze medalist(s)	Emilea Zingas; Vadym Kolesnik	United States	209.20	4	84.21	4	124.99
4	Lilah Fear; Lewis Gibson	Great Britain	208.98	3	85.09	5	123.89
5	Olivia Smart; Tim Dieck	Spain	206.37	6	81.06	2	125.31
6	Evgeniia Lopareva; Geoffrey Brissaud	France	203.77	5	83.07	7	120.70
7	Allison Reed; Saulius Ambrulevičius	Lithuania	200.66	9	79.66	6	121.00
8	Christina Carreira; Anthony Ponomarenko	United States	200.56	7	80.89	8	119.67
9	Marjorie Lajoie; Zachary Lagha	Canada	199.06	8	80.81	10	118.25
10	Diana Davis; Gleb Smolkin	Georgia	198.65	10	79.34	9	119.31
11	Kateřina Mrázková; Daniel Mrázek	Czech Republic	190.17	12	76.74	12	113.43
12	Caroline Green; Michael Parsons	United States	189.98	13	76.42	11	113.56
13	Marie-Jade Lauriault; Romain Le Gac	Canada	181.66	20	69.70	13	111.96
14	Holly Harris; Jason Chan	Australia	179.61	16	71.12	15	108.49
15	Hannah Lim; Ye Quan	South Korea	178.82	19	69.83	14	108.99
16	Phebe Bekker; James Hernandez	Great Britain	178.29	18	70.82	16	107.47
17	Jennifer Janse van Rensburg; Benjamin Steffan	Germany	177.53	17	71.02	17	106.51
18	Natálie Taschlerová; Filip Taschler	Czech Republic	173.93	14	76.35	19	97.58
19	Utana Yoshida; Masaya Morita	Japan	173.49	15	72.33	18	101.16
WD	Juulia Turkkila; Matthias Versluis	Finland	Withdrew	11	78.03	Withdrew from competition	
21	Mariia Ignateva; Danijil Szemko	Hungary	68.71	21	68.71	Did not advance to free dance	
22	Yuka Orihara; Juho Pirinen	Finland	67.45	22	67.45	Did not advance to free dance	
23	Victoria Manni; Carlo Röthlisberger	Italy	63.84	24	63.84	Did not advance to free dance	
24	Ren Junfei; Xing Jianing	China	63.75	24	63.75	Did not advance to free dance	
25	Angelina Kudryavtseva; Ilia Karankevich	Cyprus	61.94	25	61.94	Did not advance to free dance	
26	Giulia Isabella Paolino; Andrea Tuba	Italy	60.63	26	60.63	Did not advance to free dance	
27	Mariia Pinchuk; Mykyta Pogorielov	Ukraine	59.45	27	59.45	Did not advance to free dance	
28	Gina Zehnder; Beda Leon Sieber	Switzerland	59.34	28	59.34	Did not advance to free dance	
29	Milla Ruud Reitan; Nikolaj Majorov	Sweden	58.20	29	58.20	Did not advance to free dance	
30	Shira Ichilov; Mikhail Nosovitsky	Israel	58.04	30	58.04	Did not advance to free dance	
31	Samantha Ritter; Daniel Brykalov	Azerbaijan	50.65	31	50.65	Did not advance to free dance	

== Works cited ==
- "Special Regulations & Technical Rules – Single & Pair Skating and Ice Dance 2024" (PDF). International Skating Union. Archived (PDF) from the original on 3 June 2025.
