= Alexei Kiliakov =

Israeli-American ice dancer (born 2005)

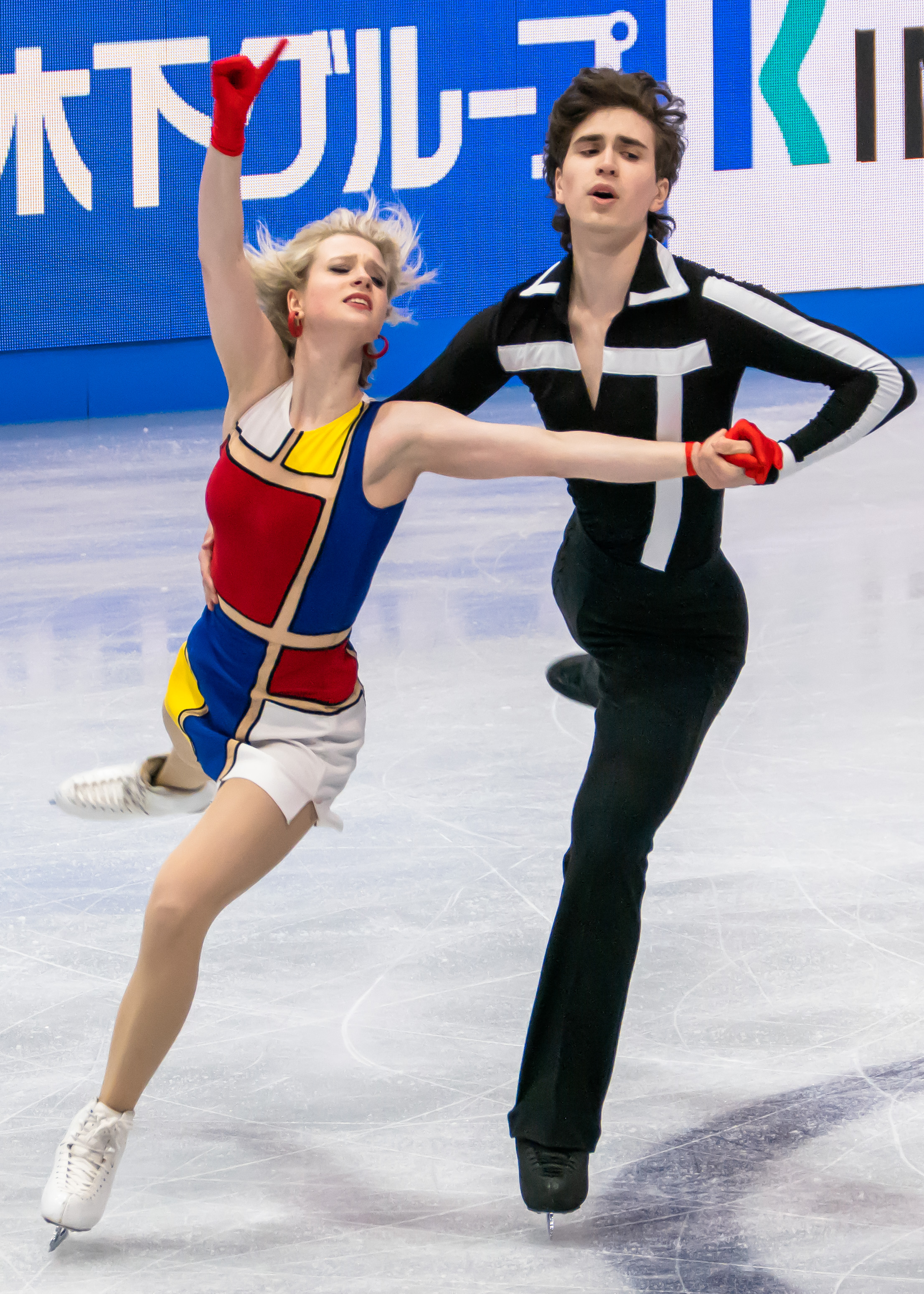
- Kiliakov and Tkachenko at the 2025 World Championships

Personal information
- Native name: אלכסיי קיליאקוב
- Other names: Alexei Kiliakov Jr.
- Born: April 11, 2005 (age 21) Gaithersburg, Maryland, U.S.
- Home town: North Potomac, Maryland, U.S.
- Height: 5 ft 11 in (1.80 m)

Figure skating career
- Country: Israel
- Partner: Elizabeth Tkachenko
- Coach: Alexei Kiliakov, Elena Novak
- Skating club: Ice Holon
- Began skating: 2009
- Retired: August 6, 2025
Medal record
Figure skating: Ice dance with Tkachenko
Representing Israel
World Junior Championships
Silver medal – second place	2024 Taipei	Ice dance
Junior Grand Prix Final
Silver medal – second place	2023–24 Beijing	Ice dance

Alexei Kiliakov (Hebrew: אלכסיי קיליאקוב; born April 11, 2005) is a retired Israeli-American ice dancer of Russian descent who currently represents Israel. With his skating partner, Elizabeth Tkachenko, he is the 2024 World Junior silver medalist and two-time Israeli national champion (2023, 2025).

== Personal life ==
Kiliakov was born on April 11, 2005, in Gaithersburg, Maryland to parents Alexei Sr. and Elena, both ice dance coaches originally from Russia. Kiliakov and his skating partner, Elizabeth Tkachenko, have known each other since they were toddlers. “We know and understand each other extremely well,” said Tkachenko. “For example, when one of us is tired or moody, the other already knows how to deal with it and how to be supportive. There are no secrets between us, we tell each other everything. We also physically feel each other very well since after so many years we have gotten used to how the other moves. Skating together feels satisfying; it's like walking for us, completely natural.”

== Career ==
=== Early years ===
Although born in the U.S., Kiliakov and his parents also have Israeli citizenship. Therefore, it was not a difficult choice to represent Israel when teaming up with Tkachenko. “It was the right time,” said Kiliakov of the switch. “Representing Israel brings more responsibility in a way, because when you receive an opportunity for more international events, you need to be ready as an athlete to show good results.”

While competing for the US, the team placed 12th at their Junior Grand Prix in France in 2019. After the switch to Israel, they placed eighth in both their Junior Grand Prix events during the 2022–23 season. The team also finished 13th and 11th at the World Junior Figure Skating Championships in 2022 and 2023, respectively.

=== 2023–24 season ===
The team had a successful season in their final year competing in the junior ranks. They medaled at both of their individual Junior Grand Prix events (Czech Republic and Italy) and qualified for the 2023-24 Junior Grand Prix Final where they won silver. “We are so happy that our hard work paid off,” said Kiliakov after the free dance. “We did a lot to improve this season. This music is from a contemporary ballet by Christopher Dean about political depression in South America. The music is very beautiful, and we watched the ballet a few times. The costume in the original play is body paint and of course we couldn't do that, but we tried to get as close to the original as possible.”

Kiliakov and Tkachenko went on to win the silver at the 2024 World Junior Figure Skating Championships and in doing so, became the first Israeli team to win a medal at this event. “It feels great to have won a medal,” said Kiliakov. “This free dance was definitely something special, but it showed us what we are capable of and motivates us to create something new.”

== Programs ==
=== Ice dance with Elizabeth Tkachenko ===
Season	Rhythm dance	Free dance	Exhibition
2025–2026	Get Ready for This (Orchestral Mix) by 2 Unlimited; Men in Black by Will Smith; Tribal Dance by 2 Unlimited choreo. by Alexei Kiliakov, Elena Novak	Adagio of Spartacus and Phrygia by Aram Khachaturian choreo. by Alexei Kiliakov, David Cipolleschi, Pierre Souquet-Basiege	
2024–2025	Svalutation by Adriano Celentano; Rumore by Raffaella Carrà; Amore No by Adriano Celentano choreo. by Alexei Kiliakov, David Cipolleschi, Pierre Souquet-Basiege	Adagio of Spartacus and Phrygia by Aram Khachaturian choreo. by Alexei Kiliakov, David Cipolleschi, Pierre Souquet-Basiege	
2023–2024	Oh Yeah; Desire; The Race by Yello choreo. by Elena Novak, Jimmie Manners	Ojos Azules by Incantation; Danzante Vasija de Barro by INCA, The Peruvian Ensemble; Sikuriadas by Inti-Illimani choreo. by Elena Novak, Jimmie Manners	Thriller by Michael Jackson; 2 Legit 2 Quit by Hammer, feat. Saja; I Don't Wanna Fight by Tina Turner; U Can't Touch This by MC Hammer
2022–2023	Ausencia; Presidente by Goran Bregović choreo. by Elena Novak, Alexei Kiliakov, Jimmie Manners	Run Boy Run; Guns for Hire by Woodkid choreo. by Elena Novak, Alexei Kiliakov, Jimmie Manners	
2021–2022	2 Legit 2 Quit by Hammer, feat. Saja; I Don't Wanna Fight by Tina Turner; U Can't Touch This by MC Hammer	Dance of the Knights (from Romeo and Juliet) by Sergei Prokofiev; Kissing You performed by Luke Evans	
2020–2021	Sparkling Diamonds performed by Nicole Kidman, Jim Broadbent, et.al.; Come What May (from Moulin Rouge!) performed by Ewan McGregor and Nicole Kidman choreo. by Elena Novak, Alexei Kiliakov	Suicide Blonde; Never Tear Us Apart; What You Need by INXS choreo. by Elena Novak, Alexei Kiliakov	
2019–2020	Beyond My Wildest Dreams; One Step Closer (from The Little Mermaid) by Alan Menken choreo. by Elena Novak, Alexei Kiliakov	The End? (from Sherlock Holmes: A Game of Shadows) by Hans Zimmer; Watermark by John Tesh, arr. by Alex Goldstein; Discombobulate (from Sherlock Holmes) by Hans Zimmer choreo. by Elena Novak, Alexei Kiliakov	

== Competitive highlights ==
=== Ice dance with Elizabeth Tkachenko (for Israel) ===
International
Event	21–22	22–23	23–24	24–25	25-26
World Championships				26th	
GP Skate America				8th	
CS Golden Spin of Zagreb				6th	
NRW Trophy				2nd	
Lake Placid IDI			7th	8th	5th
International: Junior
Junior Worlds	13th	11th	2nd		
JGP Final			2nd		
JGP Armenia			1st		
JGP Czech Republic		8th			
JGP Italy		8th			
JGP Japan			2nd		
Bavarian Open	3rd				
Egna Dance Trophy	3rd				
Lake Placid I.D.I.		1st			
Santa Claus Cup		1st			
National
Israeli Champ.		1st		1st	

=== Ice dance with Elizabeth Tkachenko (for the United States) ===
International: Junior
Event	19–20	20–21
JGP France	12th	
Lake Placid I.D.I.	10th	
National
U.S. Champ.	7th J	7th J
