= Elizabeth Tkachenko =

Israeli-American ice dancer (born 2006)

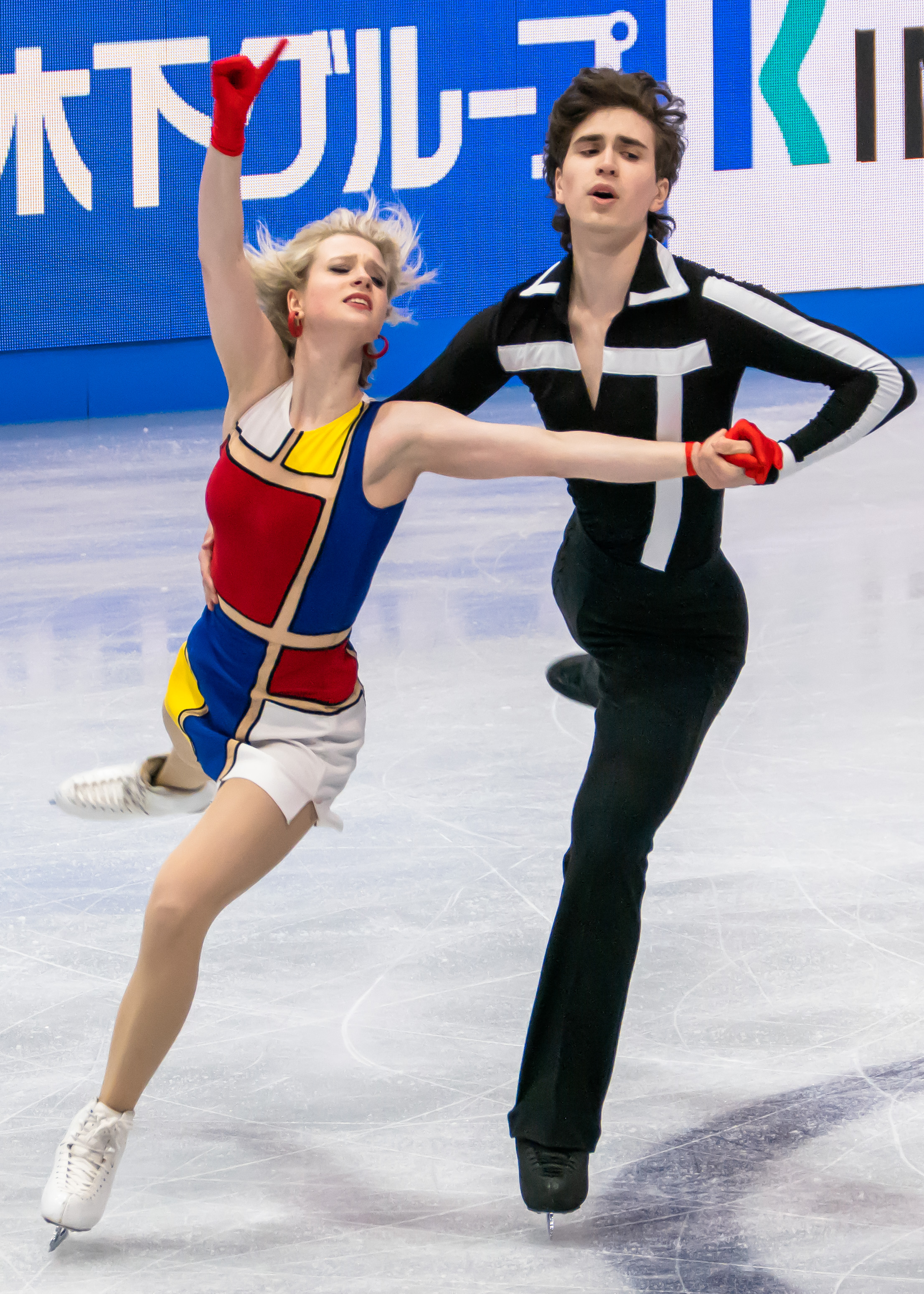
- Kiliakov and Tkachenko at the 2025 World Championships

Personal information
- Native name: אליזבת טקצ'נקו
- Born: February 21, 2006 (age 20) Rockville, Maryland, U.S.
- Home town: North Potomac, Maryland, U.S.
- Height: 5 ft 5 in (1.65 m)

Figure skating career
- Country: Germany (since 2026); Israel (until 2025)
- Partner: Michail Savitskiy (since 2026); Alexei Kiliakov (2011 - 2025)
- Coach: Alexei Kiliakov, Elena Novak
- Skating club: Ice Holon; Wheaton FSC
- Began skating: 2009
- Retired: August 6, 2025
Medal record
Figure skating: Ice dance with Kiliakov
Representing Israel
World Junior Championships
Silver medal – second place	2024 Taipei	Ice dance
Junior Grand Prix Final
Silver medal – second place	2023–24 Beijing	Ice dance

Elizabeth Tkachenko (Hebrew: אליזבת טקצ'נקו; born February 21, 2006) is an American ice dancer who currently represents Germany.

Representing Israel with her former skating partner, Alexei Kiliakov, she is the 2024 World Junior silver medalist and two-time Israeli national champion (2023, 2025).

At the junior level, Tkachenko/Kiliakov are the 2023 JGP Japan silver medalists.

== Personal life ==
Tkachenko was born on February 21, 2006, in Rockville, Maryland to parents Valery and Oxana who are both from Ukraine. She has a brother, Alexander.

Tkachenko and her former skating partner, Alexei Kiliakov, have known each other since they were toddlers. "We understand each other extremely well," said Tkachenko. "If one of us is tired or in a mood, the other knows how to respond and be supportive. There are no secrets. After so many years, we’ve also grown to physically anticipate each other’s movements. Skating together now feels as natural and satisfying as walking."

== Career ==
=== Early years ===
Tkachenko began learning how to skate at age three in public sessions. She was later invited to join the Wheaton Ice Skating Academy (WISA), founded by her current coaches, former Russian ice dancers Alexei Kiliakov and Elena Novak, and her brother. Tkachenko teamed up with her current skating partner, Alexei Kiliakov Jr., in 2011.

They decided to switch to competing for Israel prior to the 2021–22 season stating “Representing Israel brings more responsibility in a way, because when you receive an opportunity for more international events, you need to be ready as an athlete to show good results.”

=== 2023–24 season ===
The team had a successful season in their final year competing in the junior ranks. They medaled at both of their individual Junior Grand Prix events (Czech Republic and Italy) and qualified for the 2023-24 Junior Grand Prix Final where they won silver. “We are so happy that our hard work paid off,” said Kiliakov after the free dance. “We did a lot to improve this season. This music is from a contemporary ballet by Christopher Dean about political depression in South America. The music is very beautiful, and we watched the ballet a few times. The costume in the original play is body paint and of course we couldn't do that, but we tried to get as close to the original as possible.”

Kiliakov and Tkachenko went on to win the silver at the 2024 World Junior Figure Skating Championships and in doing so, became the first Israeli team to win a medal at this event. “It feels great to have won a medal,” said Kiliakov. “This free dance was definitely something special, but it showed us what we are capable of and motivates us to create something new.”

=== 2026–27 season ===
In October 2026, the German Skating Union announced that Tkachenko had formed a partnership with German ice dancer Michail Savitskiy, pending confirmation from the International Skating Union.

== Programs ==
=== Ice dance with Alexei Kiliakov ===
Season	Rhythm dance	Free dance	Exhibition
2025–2026	Get Ready for This (Orchestral Mix) by 2 Unlimited; Men in Black by Will Smith; Tribal Dance by 2 Unlimited choreo. by Alexei Kiliakov, Elena Novak	Adagio of Spartacus and Phrygia by Aram Khachaturian choreo. by Alexei Kiliakov, David Cipolleschi, Pierre Souquet-Basiege	
2024–2025	Svalutation by Adriano Celentano; Rumore by Raffaella Carrà; Amore No by Adriano Celentano choreo. by Alexei Kiliakov, David Cipolleschi, Pierre Souquet-Basiege	Adagio of Spartacus and Phrygia by Aram Khachaturian choreo. by Alexei Kiliakov, David Cipolleschi, Pierre Souquet-Basiege	
2023–2024	Oh Yeah; Desire; The Race by Yello choreo. by Elena Novak, Jimmie Manners	Ojos Azules by Incantation; Danzante Vasija de Barro by INCA, The Peruvian Ensemble; Sikuriadas by Inti-Illimani choreo. by Elena Novak, Jimmie Manners	Thriller by Michael Jackson; 2 Legit 2 Quit by Hammer, feat. Saja; I Don't Wanna Fight by Tina Turner; U Can't Touch This by MC Hammer
2022–2023	Ausencia; Presidente by Goran Bregović choreo. by Elena Novak, Alexei Kiliakov, Jimmie Manners	Run Boy Run; Guns for Hire by Woodkid choreo. by Elena Novak, Alexei Kiliakov, Jimmie Manners	
2021–2022	2 Legit 2 Quit by Hammer, feat. Saja; I Don't Wanna Fight by Tina Turner; U Can't Touch This by MC Hammer	Dance of the Knights (from Romeo and Juliet) by Sergei Prokofiev; Kissing You performed by Luke Evans	
2020–2021	Sparkling Diamonds performed by Nicole Kidman, Jim Broadbent, et.al.; Come What May (from Moulin Rouge!) performed by Ewan McGregor and Nicole Kidman choreo. by Elena Novak, Alexei Kiliakov	Suicide Blonde; Never Tear Us Apart; What You Need by INXS choreo. by Elena Novak, Alexei Kiliakov	
2019–2020	Beyond My Wildest Dreams; One Step Closer (from The Little Mermaid) by Alan Menken choreo. by Elena Novak, Alexei Kiliakov	The End? (from Sherlock Holmes: A Game of Shadows) by Hans Zimmer; Watermark by John Tesh, arr. by Alex Goldstein; Discombobulate (from Sherlock Holmes) by Hans Zimmer choreo. by Elena Novak, Alexei Kiliakov	

== Competitive highlights ==
=== Ice dance with Alexei Kiliakov (for Israel) ===
International
Event	21–22	22–23	23–24	24–25	25-26
World Championships				26th	
GP Skate America				8th	
CS Golden Spin of Zagreb				6th	
NRW Trophy				2nd	
Lake Placid IDI			7th	8th	5th
International: Junior
Junior Worlds	13th	11th	2nd		
JGP Final			2nd		
JGP Armenia			1st		
JGP Czech Republic		8th			
JGP Italy		8th			
JGP Japan			2nd		
Bavarian Open	3rd				
Egna Dance Trophy	3rd				
Lake Placid I.D.I.		1st			
Santa Claus Cup		1st			
National
Israeli Champ.		1st		1st	

=== Ice dance with Alexei Kiliakov (for the United States) ===
International: Junior
Event	19–20	20–21
JGP France	12th	
Lake Placid I.D.I.	10th	
National
U.S. Champ.	7th J	7th J
