= 2023–24 figure skating season =

- Date: July 1, 2023 – June 30, 2024
- Previous: 2022–23
- Next: 2024–25

The 2023–24 figure skating season began on July 1, 2023, and ended on June 30, 2024. During this season, elite skaters competed at the ISU (International Skating Union) Championship level at the 2024 European Championships, Four Continents Championships, World Junior Championships, World Championships, and the Winter Youth Olympics. They also competed at elite events such as the ISU Challenger Series as well as the Grand Prix and Junior Grand Prix series, culminating at the Grand Prix Final.

On June 15, 2023, the International Skating Union announced that all figure skaters and officials from Russia and Belarus would remain banned from attending any international competitions.

== Season notes ==
=== Age eligibility ===
Skaters are eligible to compete in ISU events at either junior or senior levels according to their age. These rules may not apply to non-ISU events such as national championships.

Age eligibility
Level	Date of birth
Junior (females in all disciplines; males in singles)	Born between July 1, 2004 & June 30, 2010
Junior (males in pairs & ice dance)	Born between July 1, 2002 & June 30, 2010
Senior (all disciplines)	Born before July 1, 2007

At the ISU Congress held in Phuket, Thailand, in June 2022, members of the ISU Council accepted a proposal to gradually increase the minimum age limit for senior competition to 17 years old beginning from the 2024–25 season. To avoid forcing skaters who had already competed in the senior category to return to juniors, the age limit remained unchanged during the 2022–23 season, before increasing to 16 years old during the 2023–24 season, and then will increase to 17 years old during the 2024–25 season.

== Changes ==
The date provided is the date when the change occurred or, if not available, the date when the change was announced.

=== Partnership changes ===
Partnership changes
Date	Skaters	Disc.	Type	Notes	Ref.
July 13, 2023	(Russia); Alexandra Kravchenko; Alexander Shustitskiy	Ice dance	Split		
July 15, 2023	(United States); Yahli Pedersen; Jeffrey Chen	Ice dance	Formed		
July 26, 2023	(United States); Katie McBeath; Nathan Bartholomay	Pairs	Split		
July 26, 2023	(United States); Katie McBeath; Daniil Parkman	Pairs	Formed	For the United States	
July 28, 2023	(South Korea); Cho Hye-jin; Harley Windsor	Pairs	Formed	For South Korea	
July 28, 2023	(New Zealand); Charlotte Lafond-Fournier; Richard Kam	Ice dance	Split	Kam retired.	
August 6, 2023	(United States); Sophia Baram; Daniel Tioumentsev	Pairs	Split	Tioumentsev opted to focus on education and work.	
August 7, 2023	(Poland); Ioulia Chtchetinina; Michał Woźniak	Pairs	Formed	For Poland	
August 10, 2023	(Canada); Lori-Ann Matte; Thierry Ferland	Pairs	Split		
August 10, 2023	(Canada); Gabriella Izzo; Thierry Ferland	Pairs	Formed	For Canada	
August 10, 2023	(France); Lori-Ann Matte; Noël-Antoine Pierre	Pairs	Formed	For France	
August 28, 2023	(United States); Anastasiia Smirnova; Danylo Siianytsia	Pairs	Split	Smirnova retired.	
September 12, 2023	(Russia); Elizaveta Pasechnik; Maxim Nekrasov	Ice dance	Split		
September 12, 2023	(Russia); Vasilisa Kaganovskaia; Maxim Nekrasov	Ice dance	Formed		
September 14, 2023	(United States); Haley Scott; Danylo Siianytsia	Pairs	Formed		
October 10, 2023	(Russia); Elizaveta Pasechnik; Dario Cirisano	Ice dance	Formed		
October 14, 2023	(Finland); Tilda Alteryd; Valtter Virtanen	Pairs	Split		
October 16, 2023	(South Korea); Cho Hye-jin; Harley Windsor	Pairs	Split		
November 2, 2023	(Netherlands); Nika Osipova; Dmitry Epstein	Pairs	Split		
November 14, 2023	(Russia); Arina Ushakova; Valeriy Angelopol	Ice dance	Formed		
November 16, 2023	(Canada); Gabriella Izzo; Thierry Ferland	Pairs	Split	Izzo retired.	
December 5, 2023	(France); Oxana Vouillamoz; Flavien Giniaux	Pairs	Split		
December 20, 2023	(United States); Lorraine McNamara; Anton Spiridonov	Ice dance	Split		
December 27, 2023	(Russia); Arina Ushakova; Valeriy Angelopol	Ice dance	Split		
February 22, 2024	(Canada); Brooke McIntosh; Benjamin Mimar	Pairs	Split		
February 22, 2024	(Canada); Fiona Bombardier; Benjamin Mimar	Pairs	Formed		
March 26, 2024	(United States); Chelsea Liu; Balázs Nagy	Pairs	Split	Liu prioritizing mental health	
April 9, 2024	(United States); Yahli Pedersen; Jeffrey Chen	Ice dance	Split		
April 15, 2024	(Russia); Daria Boyarintseva; Roman Pleshkov	Pairs	Split	Pleshkov retired.	
April 18, 2024	(Switzerland); Oxana Vouillamoz; Tom Bouvart	Pairs	Formed	For Switzerland	
April 22, 2024	(Japan); Misato Komatsubara; Tim Koleto	Ice dance	Split	Komatsubara retired.	
April 22, 2024	(Georgia (country)); Maria Kazakova; Georgy Reviya	Ice dance	Split		
April 25, 2024	(France); Chloe Panetta; Flavien Giniaux	Pairs	Formed	For France	
May 8, 2024	(Canada); Joy Weinberg; Thierry Ferland	Pairs	Formed	For Canada	
May 21, 2024	(Ukraine); Mariia Holubtsova; Kyryl Bielobrov	Ice dance	Split		
May 23, 2024	(United States); Annabelle Morozov; Jeffrey Chen	Ice dance	Formed	For the United States	
June 6, 2024	(Azerbaijan); Maxine Weatherby; Oleksandr Kolosovskyi	Ice dance	Formed	For Azerbaijan	
June 7, 2024	(Italy); Anna Valesi; Manuel Piazza	Pairs	Split		
June 10, 2024	(United States); Audrey Shin; Balázs Nagy	Pairs	Formed		
June 19, 2024	(United States); Vanessa Pham; Anton Spiridonov	Ice dance	Formed		
June 21, 2024	(United States); Haley Scott; Danylo Siianytsia	Pairs	Split		
June 21, 2024	(United States); Meghan Fredette; Danylo Siianytsia	Pairs	Formed	For the United States	
June 27, 2024	(France); Chloe Panetta; Flavien Giniaux	Pairs	Split	Panetta retired.	

=== Retirements ===
Retirements
Date	Skater(s)	Disc.	Ref.
July 11, 2023	(South Korea); Lim Eun-soo	Women	
July 17, 2023	(Russia); Tiffany Zahorski; Jonathan Guerreiro	Ice dance	
July 28, 2023	(New Zealand); Richard Kam	Ice dance	
August 11, 2023	(Russia); Andrei Bagin	Ice dance	
August 14, 2023	(Japan); Shoya Ichihashi	Pairs	
August 15, 2023	(China); Han Cong	Pairs	
August 28, 2023	(Italy); Carolina Portesi Peroni	Ice dance	
August 28, 2023	(United States); Anastasiia Smirnova	Pairs	
September 7, 2023	(Russia); Daria Usacheva	Women	
September 25, 2023	(Russia); Andrei Lazukin	Men	
October 24, 2023	(Canada); Emmanuelle Proft; Nicolas Nadeau	Pairs	
November 13, 2023	(Russia); Evgenia Tarasova; Vladimir Morozov	Pairs	
November 16, 2023	(Canada); Gabriella Izzo	Pairs	
November 30, 2023	(Germany); Nicole Schott	Women	
December 21, 2023	(Germany); Katharina Müller	Ice dance	
December 28, 2023	(Finland); Jussiville Partanen	Ice dance	
December 30, 2023	(Denmark); Maia Sørensen	Women	
January 5, 2024	(Japan); Marin Honda	Women	
February 17, 2024	(Russia); Alexander Samarin	Men	
March 9, 2024	(Japan); Tomoe Kawabata	Women	
March 10, 2024	(United Kingdom); Graham Newberry	Men	
April 13, 2024	(Slovenia); Daša Grm	Women	
April 15, 2024	(Russia); Roman Pleshkov	Pairs	
April 22, 2024	(Japan); Misato Komatsubara	Ice dance	
May 1, 2024	(Canada); Conrad Orzel	Men	
May 8, 2024	(Japan); Shoma Uno	Men	
May 16, 2024	(Germany); Denis Gurdzhi	Men	

=== Coaching changes ===
Coaching changes
Date	Skater(s)	Disc.	From	To	Ref.
July 8, 2023	(Mexico); Donovan Carrillo	Men	Gregorio Núñez	Jonathan Mills & Myke Gillman	
July 17, 2023	(Sweden); Greta Crafoord; John Crafoord	Pairs	Aljona Savchenko	Bruno Massot	
July 22, 2023	(United States); Audrey Shin	Women	Tammy Gambill	Tammy Gambill & Tatiana Malinina	
July 30, 2023	(Poland); Ekaterina Kurakova	Women	Lorenzo Magri & Angelina Turenko	Angelina Turenko & Brian Orser	
September 5, 2023	(Philippines); Isabella Gamez; Alexander Korovin	Pairs	Marina Zueva & Dmitri Savin	Dmitri Savin, Alexei Bychenko, Evgeni Krasnopolski & Galit Chait	
September 5, 2023	(Italy); Daniel Grassl	Men	Eteri Tutberidze, Sergei Dudakov & Daniil Gleikhengauz	Edoardo De Bernardis	
September 13, 2023	(United States); Tomoki Hiwatashi	Men	Christy Krall, Damon Allen & Mark Pillay	Mie Hamada	
September 20, 2023	(Monaco); Davide Lewton Brain	Men	Didier Lucine & Sophie Golaz	Michael Huth & Robert Dierking	
September 26, 2023	(Russia); Sofia Samodelkina	Women	Svetlana Sokolovskaya	Evgeni Plushenko	
October 6, 2023	(Austria); Olga Mikutina	Women	Elena Romanova	Elena Romanova, Galit Chait, Alexei Bychenko & Evgeni Krasnopolski	
November 18, 2023	(South Korea); You Young	Women	Chi Hyun-jung	Shin Hea-sook	
December 2023	(Norway); Mia Risa Gomez	Women	Nuriya Pirogova & Lorenzo Magri	Agnes Zawadzki	
May 22, 2024	(Poland); Ekaterina Kurakova	Women	Angelina Turenko & Brian Orser	Florent Amodio	
June 10, 2024	(United States); Audrey Shin	Pairs	Tammy Gambill, Tatiana Malinina & Roman Skorniakov	Bruno Marcotte, Andrew Evans & Tammy Gambill	
June 10, 2024	(United States); Balázs Nagy	Pairs	Todd Sand, Jenni Meno, Brandon Frazier, Christine Binder & Andrew Evans	Bruno Marcotte, Andrew Evans & Tammy Gambill	
June 14, 2024	(Switzerland); Kimmy Repond	Women	Jérômie Repond & Mathieu Delcambre	Jérômie Repond & Michael Huth	

=== Nationality changes ===
If skaters of different nationalities form a team, the ISU requires that they choose one country to represent.

Nationality changes
Date	Skater(s)	Disc.	From	To	Notes	Ref.
July 26, 2023	Daniil Parkman	Pairs	Georgia	United States	Partnered with Katie McBeath	
July 28, 2023	Harley Windsor	Pairs	Australia	South Korea	Partnered with Cho Hye-jin	
August 7, 2023	Ioulia Chtchetinina	Pairs	Hungary	Poland	Partnered with Michał Woźniak	
August 10, 2023	Gabriella Izzo	Pairs	United States	Canada	Partnered with Thierry Ferland	
August 10, 2023	Lori-Ann Matte	Pairs	Canada	France	Partnered with Noël-Antoine Pierre	
September 2023	Sarina Joos	Women	Switzerland	Italy		
October 2023	Daniel Samohin	Men	Israel	United States		
November 2023	Corey Circelli	Men	Canada	Italy		
April 18, 2024	Oxana Vouillamoz	Pairs	France	Switzerland		
April 18, 2024	Tom Bouvart	Pairs	France	Switzerland		
May 23, 2024	Ekaterina Geynish; Dmitrii Chigirev	Pairs	Russia	Uzbekistan		
May 23, 2024	Sofia Samodelkina	Women	Russia	Kazakhstan		
June 6, 2024	Maxine Weatherby	Ice dance	Kazakhstan	Azerbaijan	Partnered with Oleksandr Kolosovskyi	
June 17, 2024	Edrian Paul Celestino	Men	Philippines	Canada		

== International competitions ==
Scheduled competitions:

Code key

- S – Senior event
- J – Junior event
- N – Novice event
- M – Men's singles
- W – Women's singles
- P – Pair skating
- D – Ice dance

Color key

- ISU Championships
- Grand Prix or Junior Grand Prix
- Challenger Series
- Winter Youth Olympics
- Other competition

International competitions (2023)
Dates	Event	Type	Level	Disc.	Location	Ref.
July 31 – August 2	Lake Placid Ice Dance International	Other	S/J	D	Lake Placid, New York, United States	
August 9–13	Cranberry Cup International	Other	S/J	M/W	Norwood, Massachusetts, United States	
August 16–19	Asian Open Trophy	Other	All	M/W	Bangkok, Thailand	
August 23–26	JGP Thailand	Junior Grand Prix	Junior	M/W/D	Bangkok, Thailand	
August 30 – September 2	JGP Austria	Junior Grand Prix	Junior	All	Linz, Austria	
September 6–7	John Nicks Pairs Challenge	Other	S/J	P	New York, New York, United States	
September 6–9	JGP Turkey	Junior Grand Prix	Junior	All	Istanbul, Turkey	
September 8–10	Lombardia Trophy	Challenger	Senior	All	Bergamo, Italy	
September 13–16	JGP Japan	Junior Grand Prix	Junior	M/W/D	Osaka, Japan	
September 13–17	Jelgava Cup	Other	All	M/W	Jelgava, Latvia	
September 14–16	Autumn Classic International	Challenger	Senior	All	Montreal, Quebec, Canada	
September 20–23	JGP Hungary	Junior Grand Prix	Junior	All	Budapest, Hungary	
September 20–23	Nebelhorn Trophy	Challenger	Senior	All	Oberstdorf, Germany	
September 27–30	JGP Poland	Junior Grand Prix	Junior	All	Gdańsk, Poland	
September 28–30	Nepela Memorial	Challenger	Senior	M/W/D	Bratislava, Slovakia	
October 3–5	Shanghai Trophy	Other	Senior	All	Shanghai, China	
October 4–7	JGP Armenia	Junior Grand Prix	Junior	M/W/D	Yerevan, Armenia	
October 4–8	Finlandia Trophy	Challenger	Senior	All	Espoo, Finland	
October 5–8	Kings Cup International	Other	S/J	M/W	Los Angeles, California, United States	
October 7	Japan Open	Other	Senior	M/W	Saitama, Japan	
October 13–15	Budapest Trophy	Challenger	Senior	M/W/D	Budapest, Hungary	
October 13–15	Budapest Trophy	Other	Senior	P	Budapest, Hungary	
October 13–15	Budapest Trophy	Other	Junior	M/W/D	Budapest, Hungary	
October 14–15	Tayside Trophy	Other	S/J	M/W/P	Dundee, Scotland, United Kingdom	
October 18–22	Mezzaluna Cup	Other	All	D	Mentana, Italy	
October 18–22	Trophée Métropole Nice Côte d'Azur	Other	S/J	All	Nice, France	
October 19–22	Diamond Spin	Other	All	M/W/P	Katowice, Poland	
October 19–22	Kaunas Ice Autumn Cup	Other	S/J	M/W	Kaunas, Lithuania	
October 20–22	Skate America	Grand Prix	Senior	All	Allen, Texas, United States	
October 26–29	Swiss Ice Skating Open	Other	All	M/W/D	Lausanne, Switzerland	
October 27–29	Skate Canada International	Grand Prix	Senior	All	Vancouver, British Columbia, Canada	
October 27–29	Tirnavia Ice Cup	Other	All	M/W	Trnava, Slovakia	
November 1–4	Denis Ten Memorial Challenge	Challenger	Senior	M/W/D	Astana, Kazakhstan	
November 1–4	Denis Ten Memorial Challenge	Other	Junior	M/W/D	Astana, Kazakhstan	
November 2–5	50th Volvo Open Cup	Other	S/J	M/W	Riga, Latvia	
November 3–5	Grand Prix de France	Grand Prix	Senior	All	Angers, France	
November 7–12	Denkova-Staviski Cup	Other	All	M/W	Sofia, Bulgaria	
November 10–12	Cup of China	Grand Prix	Senior	All	Chongqing, China	
November 10–12	Pavel Roman Memorial	Other	All	D	Olomuc, Czech Republic	
November 15–19	Warsaw Cup	Challenger	Senior	M/W/D	Warsaw, Poland	
November 15–19	Warsaw Cup	Other	Senior	P	Warsaw, Poland	
November 16–19	NRW Trophy	Other	All	M/W/D	Dortmund, Germany	
November 16–19	Skate Celje	Other	All	M/W	Celje, Slovenia	
November 17–19	Grand Prix of Espoo	Grand Prix	Senior	All	Espoo, Finland	
November 21–23	Tallinn Trophy	Other	S/J	M/W	Tallinn, Estonia	
November 24–26	NHK Trophy	Grand Prix	Senior	All	Osaka, Japan	
November 27 – December 3	Bosphorus Cup	Other	All	M/W/D	Istanbul, Turkey	
November 29 – December 4	Santa Claus Cup	Other	J/N	M/W/D	Budapest, Hungary	
December 6–9	Golden Spin of Zagreb	Challenger	Senior	All	Sisak, Croatia	
December 6–10	EduSport Trophy	Other	Senior	W	Bucharest, Romania	
December 6–10	EduSport Trophy	Other	J/N	M/W	Bucharest, Romania	
December 7–10	Grand Prix Final	Grand Prix	S/J	All	Beijing, China	
December 8–10	Latvia Trophy	Other	S/J	M/W/D	Riga, Latvia	

International competitions (2024)
Dates	Event	Type	Level	Disc.	Location	Ref.
January 4–6	Skate Helena	Other	All	M/W	Belgrade, Serbia	
January 8–14	European Championships	Championship	Senior	All	Kaunas, Lithuania	
January 18–21	51st Volvo Open Cup	Other	S/J	M/W	Riga, Latvia	
January 22–28	Ephesus Cup	Other	All	M/W/D	İzmir, Turkey	
January 25–28	Reykjavík International Games	Other	All	M/W	Reykjavík, Iceland	
January 27 – February 1	Winter Youth Olympics	Olympics	Junior	All	Gangwon, South Korea	
January 29 – February 4	Four Continents Championships	Championship	Senior	All	Shanghai, China	
January 30 – February 4	Sofia Trophy	Other	All	M/W	Sofia, Bulgaria	
January 30 – February 4	Bavarian Open	Other	All	All	Oberstdorf, Germany	
February 1–4	Icebeat Winter Trophy	Other	S/J	M/W	Kaunas, Lithuania	
February 1–4	Nordic Championships	Other	All	All	Borås, Sweden	
February 8–11	Lõunakeskus Trophy	Other	S/J	M/W	Tartu, Estonia	
February 8–11	Egna Spring Trophy	Other	All	D	Egna, Italy	
February 8–11	Dragon Trophy & Tivoli Cup	Other	All	M/W	Ljubljana, Slovenia	
February 15–18	Tallink Hotels Cup	Other	S/J	M/W	Tallinn, Estonia	
February 15–18	Abu Dhabi Classic Trophy	Other	S/J	M/W	Abu Dhabi, United Arab Emirates	
February 16–18	Sarajevo Open	Other	Senior	W	Sarajevo, Bosnia and Herzegovina	
February 16–18	Sarajevo Open	Other	Junior	M/W	Sarajevo, Bosnia and Herzegovina	
February 20–25	Bellu Memorial	Other	Senior	W	Bucharest, Romania	
February 20–25	Bellu Memorial	Other	Junior	M/W	Bucharest, Romania	
February 22–25	International Challenge Cup	Other	All	All	Tilburg, Netherlands	
February 22–25	Merano Ice Trophy	Other	All	M/W	Merano, Italy	
February 26 – March 3	World Junior Championships	Championship	Junior	All	Taipei, Taiwan	
March 6–10	Maria Olszewska Memorial	Other	All	All	Łódź, Poland	
March 8–10	Sonja Henie Trophy	Other	All	M/W	Oslo, Norway	
March 15–17	Coupe du Printemps	Other	All	M/W	Kockelscheuer, Luxembourg	
March 18–24	World Championships	Championship	Senior	All	Montreal, Quebec, Canada	
April 4–7	Black Sea Ice Cup	Other	All	M/W	Kranevo, Bulgaria	
April 10–14	Triglav Trophy & Narcisa Cup	Other	All	M/W	Jesenice, Slovenia	
May 3–6	Thailand Open Figure Skating Trophy	Other	All	M/W	Bangkok, Thailand	
May 14–19	Mexico Cup	Other	All	M/W	Mexico City, Mexico	
May 29–31	Oceania International	Other	All	All	Melbourne, Australia	

=== Cancelled ===
Cancelled competitions (2023–24)
Dates	Event	Type	Location	Ref.
October 26–29	Crystal Skate of Romania	Other	Bucharest, Romania	
November 7–13	Ice Challenge	Challenger	Graz, Austria	
December 14–17	Christmas Magic Cup	Other	Bucharest, Romania	
February 2–4	Jégvirág Cup	Other	Miskolc, Hungary	
February 7–11	Berlin Open	Other	Berlin, Germany	
April 5–7	Wolmar Spring Cup	Other	Valmiera, Latvia	
June 7–10	Hollins Trophy International	Other	Sydney, Australia	

== International medalists ==
=== Men's singles ===
Championships
Competition	Gold	Silver	Bronze	Ref.
(Lithuania) European Championships	(France) Adam Siao Him Fa	(Estonia) Aleksandr Selevko	(Italy) Matteo Rizzo	
(China) Four Continents Championships	(Japan) Yuma Kagiyama	(Japan) Shun Sato	(South Korea) Cha Jun-hwan	
(Chinese Taipei) World Junior Championships	(South Korea) Seo Min-kyu	(Japan) Rio Nakata	(Slovakia) Adam Hagara	
(Canada) World Championships	(United States) Ilia Malinin	(Japan) Yuma Kagiyama	(France) Adam Siao Him Fa	

Grand Prix
Competition	Gold	Silver	Bronze	Ref.
(United States) Skate America	(United States) Ilia Malinin	(France) Kévin Aymoz	(Japan) Shun Sato	
Skate Canada International	(Japan) Sōta Yamamoto	(Japan) Kao Miura	(Italy) Matteo Rizzo	
Grand Prix de France	(France) Adam Siao Him Fa	(United States) Ilia Malinin	(Japan) Yuma Kagiyama	
Cup of China	(France) Adam Siao Him Fa	(Japan) Shoma Uno	(Kazakhstan) Mikhail Shaidorov	
(Finland) Grand Prix of Espoo	(Japan) Kao Miura	(Japan) Shun Sato	(France) Kévin Aymoz	
(Japan) NHK Trophy	(Japan) Yuma Kagiyama	(Japan) Shoma Uno	(Switzerland) Lukas Britschgi	
(China) Grand Prix Final	(United States) Ilia Malinin	(Japan) Shoma Uno	(Japan) Yuma Kagiyama	

Junior Grand Prix
Competition	Gold	Silver	Bronze	Ref.
JGP Thailand	(Japan) Rio Nakata	(France) François Pitot	(New Zealand) Yanhao Li	
JGP Austria	(Slovakia) Adam Hagara	(South Korea) Kim Hyun-gyeom	(United States) Beck Strommer	
JGP Turkey	(South Korea) Seo Min-kyu	(Japan) Rio Nakata	(Japan) Daiya Ebihara	
JGP Japan	(France) François Pitot	(South Korea) Lim Ju-heon	(United States) Daniel Martynov	
JGP Hungary	(South Korea) Kim Hyun-gyeom	(Switzerland) Naoki Rossi	(Japan) Haru Kakiuchi	
JGP Poland	(South Korea) Lim Ju-heon	(United States) Beck Strommer	(Japan) Daiya Ebihara	
JGP Armenia	(United States) Daniel Martynov	(Japan) Shunsuke Nakamura	(Latvia) Fedor Kulish	
(China) Junior Grand Prix Final	(Japan) Rio Nakata	(South Korea) Kim Hyun-gyeom	(Slovakia) Adam Hagara	

Challenger Series
Competition	Gold	Silver	Bronze	Ref.
(Italy) Lombardia Trophy	(Japan) Yuma Kagiyama	(Georgia (country)) Nika Egadze	(United States) Andrew Torgashev	
(Canada) Autumn Classic International	(United States) Ilia Malinin	(France) Kévin Aymoz	(Canada) Stephen Gogolev	
(Germany) Nebelhorn Trophy	(France) Adam Siao Him Fa	(Japan) Kazuki Tomono	(Japan) Koshiro Shimada	
(Slovakia) Nepela Memorial	(Italy) Gabriele Frangipani	(Georgia (country)) Nika Egadze	(Israel) Mark Gorodnitsky	
(Finland) Finlandia Trophy	(Japan) Kao Miura	(Japan) Shun Sato	(Estonia) Aleksandr Selevko	
(Hungary) Budapest Trophy	(Italy) Nikolaj Memola	(Switzerland) Lukas Britschgi	(United States) Tomoki Hiwatashi	
(Kazakhstan) Denis Ten Memorial Challenge	(South Korea) Lim Ju-heon	(Georgia (country)) Nika Egadze	(South Korea) Kim Han-gil	
(Poland) Warsaw Cup	(Switzerland) Lukas Britschgi	(Israel) Mark Gorodnitsky	(United States) Jason Brown	
(Croatia) Golden Spin of Zagreb	(China) Jin Boyang	(Kazakhstan) Mikhail Shaidorov	(Estonia) Aleksandr Selevko	

Other international competitions
Competition	Gold	Silver	Bronze	Ref.
(United States) Cranberry Cup International	(Israel) Mark Gorodnitsky	(Canada) Wesley Chiu	(United States) Jimmy Ma	
(Thailand) Asian Open Trophy	(China) Dai Daiwei	(South Korea) Cha Young-hyun	(Australia) Darian Kaptich	
(Latvia) Jelgava Cup	(Ukraine) Kyrylo Lishenko	(Latvia) Fedir Kulish	(Lithuania) Daniel Korabelnik	
(China) Shanghai Trophy	(France) Adam Siao Him Fa	(South Korea) Cha Jun-hwan	(China) Jin Boyang	
(United States) Kings Cup International	(United States) Goku Endo	(United States) Yaroslav Paniot	(United States) Samuel Mindra	
(United Kingdom) Tayside Trophy	(Austria) Maurizio Zandron	(Mexico) Donovan Carrillo	(United Kingdom) Ken Fitterer	
(Lithuania) Kaunas Ice Autumn Cup	(Lithuania) Daniel Korabelnik	(Bulgaria) Larry Loupolover	No other competitors	
(France) Trophée Métropole Nice Côte d'Azur	(France) Adam Siao Him Fa	(France) François Pitot	(France) Corentin Spinar	
(Poland) Diamond Spin	(Poland) Kornel Witkowski	(Poland) Matvii Yefymenko	(Poland) Miłosz Witkowski	
(Slovakia) Tirnavia Ice Cup	(Italy) Gabriele Frangipani	(Slovakia) Adam Hagara	(Croatia) Jari Kessler	
(Switzerland) Swiss Ice Skating Open	(Monaco) Davide Lewton Brain	(Switzerland) Micha Steffen	(Singapore) Pagiel Yie Ken Sng	
(Latvia) 50th Volvo Open Cup	(Poland) Vladimir Samoilov	(Spain) Tomàs Llorenç Guarino Sabaté	(Hungary) Aleksandr Vlasenko	
(Bulgaria) Denkova-Staviski Cup	(Austria) Maurizio Zandron	(Turkey) Burak Demirboğa	(Bulgaria) Alexander Zlatkov	
(Germany) NRW Trophy	(Spain) Tomàs-Llorenç Guarino Sabaté	(Mexico) Donovan Carrillo	(Croatia) Jari Kessler	
(Slovenia) Skate Celje	(Slovenia) David Sedej	No other competitors		
(Estonia) Tallinn Trophy	(Israel) Lev Vinokur	(Kazakhstan) Rakhat Bralin	(Ukraine) Kyrylo Marsak	
(Turkey) Bosphorus Cup	(Azerbaijan) Vladimir Litvintsev	(Turkey) Burak Demirboğa	(Kazakhstan) Rakhat Bralin	
Latvia Trophy	(Latvia) Deniss Vasiļjevs	(Israel) Lev Vinokur	(Latvia) Fedir Kulish	
(Serbia) Skate Helena	(Bulgaria) Larry Loupolover	(Chinese Taipei) Guan Ting Zhou	No other competitors	
(Latvia) 51st Volvo Open Cup	(Estonia) Arlet Levandi	(Israel) Lev Vinokur	(Finland) Arttu Juusola	
(Turkey) Ephesus Cup	(Turkey) Burak Demirboğa	(Turkey) Alp Eren Ozkan	(Turkey) Alp Tore Ovalioglu	
(Iceland) Reykjavík International Games	(United Kingdom) Connor Bray	No other competitors		
(Bulgaria) Sofia Trophy	(Bulgaria) Alexander Zlatkov	(Turkey) Burak Demirboğa	(France) Ian Vauclin	
(Germany) Bavarian Open	(Latvia) Deniss Vasiļjevs	(Czech Republic) Georgiy Reshtenko	(Germany) Kai Jagoda	
(Lithuania) Icebeat Winter Trophy	(Armenia) Semen Daniliants	(Lithuania) Daniels Kockers	No other competitors	
(Sweden) Nordic Championships	(Sweden) Andreas Nordebäck	(Sweden) Gabriel Folkesson	(Finland) Makar Suntsev	
(Estonia) Lõunakeskus Trophy	(Estonia) Aleksandr Selevko	No other competitors		
(Slovenia) Dragon Trophy	(Hungary) Aleksandr Vlasenko	(France) Corentin Spinar	(Slovenia) David Sedej	
(Estonia) Tallink Hotels Cup	(Japan) Kao Miura	(Japan) Nozomu Yoshioka	(Finland) Valtter Virtanen	
(United Arab Emirates) Abu Dhabi Classic Trophy	(Estonia) Aleksandr Selevko	(Armenia) Semen Daniliants	(Hong Kong) Naoki Ma	
(Netherlands) International Challenge Cup	(Kazakhstan) Mikhail Shaidorov	(Japan) Tatsuya Tsuboi	(Japan) Kazuki Tomono	
(Italy) Merano Ice Trophy	(Italy) Nikolaj Memola	(Azerbaijan) Vladimir Litvintsev	(Italy) Gabriele Frangipani	
(Poland) Maria Olszewska Memorial	(Turkey) Alp Eren Ozkan	(Poland) Milosz Witkowski	(Spain) Ismael Hernandez	
(Norway) Sonja Henie Trophy	(Finland) Jan Ollikainen	(Lithuania) Daniel Korabelnik	(United Kingdom) Connor Bray	
(Luxembourg) Coupe du Printemps	(Kazakhstan) Dias Jirenbayev	(France) Corentin Spinar	(Spain) Pablo García	
(Bulgaria) Black Sea Ice Cup	(Bulgaria) Beat Shyumperli	No other competitors		
(Slovenia) Triglav Trophy	(Spain) Iker Oyarzabal	(Switzerland) Nico Steffen	(Republic of Ireland) Dillon Judge	
Thailand Open Trophy	(Taiwan) Yuhsiang Li	(Malaysia) Ze Zeng Fang	(Hong Kong) Heung Lai Zhao	
Mexico Cup	(Mexico) Jorge Arturo Garcia Coronado	No other competitors		
(Australia) Oceania International	(Australia) Darian Kaptich	No other competitors		

=== Women's singles ===
Championships
Competition	Gold	Silver	Bronze	Ref.
(Lithuania) European Championships	(Belgium) Loena Hendrickx	(Georgia (country)) Anastasiia Gubanova	(Belgium) Nina Pinzarrone	
(China) Four Continents Championships	(Japan) Mone Chiba	(South Korea) Kim Chae-yeon	(Japan) Rinka Watanabe	
(Chinese Taipei) World Junior Championships	(Japan) Mao Shimada	(South Korea) Shin Ji-a	(Japan) Rena Uezono	
(Canada) World Championships	(Japan) Kaori Sakamoto	(United States) Isabeau Levito	(South Korea) Kim Chae-yeon	

Grand Prix
Competition	Gold	Silver	Bronze	Ref.
(United States) Skate America	(Belgium) Loena Hendrickx	(United States) Isabeau Levito	(Estonia) Niina Petrõkina	
Skate Canada International	(Japan) Kaori Sakamoto	(South Korea) Kim Chae-yeon	(Japan) Rino Matsuike	
Grand Prix de France	(United States) Isabeau Levito	(Belgium) Nina Pinzarrone	(Japan) Rion Sumiyoshi	
Cup of China	(Japan) Hana Yoshida	(Japan) Rinka Watanabe	(Belgium) Loena Hendrickx	
(Finland) Grand Prix of Espoo	(Japan) Kaori Sakamoto	(Japan) Rion Sumiyoshi	(United States) Amber Glenn	
(Japan) NHK Trophy	(United States) Ava Marie Ziegler	(United States) Lindsay Thorngren	(Belgium) Nina Pinzarrone	
(China) Grand Prix Final	(Japan) Kaori Sakamoto	(Belgium) Loena Hendrickx	(Japan) Hana Yoshida	

Junior Grand Prix
Competition	Gold	Silver	Bronze	Ref.
JGP Thailand	(Japan) Ami Nakai	(South Korea) Kim Yu-seong	(South Korea) Han Hee-sue	
JGP Austria	(South Korea) Shin Ji-a	(Japan) Haruna Murakami	(South Korea) Kwon Min-sol	
JGP Turkey	(Japan) Ami Nakai	(Japan) Rena Uezono	(South Korea) Kim Yu-jae	
JGP Japan	(Japan) Mao Shimada	(Japan) Yo Takagi	(Chinese Taipei) Tsai Yu-Feng	
JGP Hungary	(South Korea) Shin Ji-a	(South Korea) Kim Yu-seong	(Japan) Ayumi Shibayama	
JGP Poland	(Japan) Rena Uezono	(South Korea) Kwon Min-sol	(South Korea) Youn Seo-jin	
JGP Armenia	(Japan) Mao Shimada	(United States) Elyce Lin-Gracey	(United States) Sherry Zhang	
(China) Junior Grand Prix Final	(Japan) Mao Shimada	(South Korea) Shin Ji-a	(Japan) Rena Uezono	

Challenger Series
Competition	Gold	Silver	Bronze	Ref.
(Italy) Lombardia Trophy	(Georgia (country)) Anastasiia Gubanova	(Japan) Hana Yoshida	(South Korea) Kim Chae-yeon	
(Canada) Autumn Classic International	(Japan) Kaori Sakamoto	(Canada) Kaiya Ruiter	(Canada) Justine Miclette	
(Germany) Nebelhorn Trophy	(United States) Isabeau Levito	(Switzerland) Kimmy Repond	(South Korea) Kim Min-chae	
(Slovakia) Nepela Memorial	(South Korea) Kim Chae-yeon	(South Korea) Lee Hae-in	(Canada) Madeline Schizas	
(Finland) Finlandia Trophy	(South Korea) Kim Ye-lim	(Japan) Rinka Watanabe	(Georgia (country)) Anastasiia Gubanova	
(Hungary) Budapest Trophy	(United States) Bradie Tennell	(France) Léa Serna	(United States) Clare Seo	
(Kazakhstan) Denis Ten Memorial Challenge	(Israel) Mariia Seniuk	(South Korea) Choi Da-bin	(Georgia (country)) Alina Urushadze	
(Poland) Warsaw Cup	(Poland) Ekaterina Kurakova	(Italy) Anna Pezzetta	(United States) Elyce Lin-Gracey	
(Croatia) Golden Spin of Zagreb	(Italy) Sarina Joos	(United States) Amber Glenn	(United States) Starr Andrews	

Other international competitions
Competition	Gold	Silver	Bronze	Ref.
(United States) Cranberry Cup International	(United States) Lindsay Thorngren	(United States) Ava Marie Ziegler	(Canada) Kaiya Ruiter	
(Thailand) Asian Open Trophy	(China) An Xiangyi	(Chinese Taipei) Ting Tzu-Han	(China) Cheng Jiaying	
(Latvia) Jelgava Cup	(Latvia) Sofja Stepčenko	(Lithuania) Meda Variakojytė	(Estonia) Kristina Lisovskaja	
(China) Shanghai Trophy	(United States) Bradie Tennell	(South Korea) Lee Hae-in	(Estonia) Niina Petrõkina	
(United States) Kings Cup International	(United States) Audrey Shin	(United States) Starr Andrews	(United States) Hannah Herrera	
(United Kingdom) Tayside Trophy	(Lithuania) Aleksandra Golovkina	(Poland) Karolina Białas	(United Kingdom) Genevieve Somerville	
(Lithuania) Kaunas Ice Autumn Cup	(Lithuania) Meda Variakojytė	(Estonia) Kristina Lisovskaja	(Lithuania) Darja Reginevič	
(Poland) Diamond Spin	(Poland) Laura Szczęsna	(Poland) Karolina Białas	(Iceland) Júlía Sylvía Gunnarsdóttir	
(France) Trophée Métropole Nice Côte d'Azur	(Finland) Emmi Peltonen	(Israel) Mariia Seniuk	(Bulgaria) Alexandra Feigin	
(Slovakia) Tirnavia Ice Cup	(Romania) Julia Sauter	(Slovakia) Vanesa Šelmeková	(Ukraine) Yelyzaveta Babenko	
(Switzerland) Swiss Ice Skating Open	(Austria) Olga Mikutina	(Lithuania) Aleksandra Golovkina	(Finland) Olivia Lisko	
(Latvia) 50th Volvo Open Cup	(Sweden) Josefin Taljegård	(Latvia) Sofja Stepčenko	(United Kingdom) Kristen Spours	
(Bulgaria) Denkova-Staviski Cup	(Bulgaria) Alexandra Feigin	(Ukraine) Anastasia Gozhva	(United Kingdom) Nina Povey	
(Germany) NRW Trophy	(Mexico) Andrea Montesinos Cantú	(Sweden) Nina Fredriksson	(Sweden) Lovissa Aav	
(Slovenia) Skate Celje	(Ukraine) Anastasia Gozhva	(Italy) Ginevra Negrello	(Slovenia) Julija Lovrencic	
(Estonia) Tallinn Trophy	(Italy) Sarina Joos	(Sweden) Josefin Taljegård	(Estonia) Kristina Lisovskaja	
(Turkey) Bosphorus Cup	(Chinese Taipei) Ting Tzu-Han	(Lithuania) Meda Variakojytė	(Czech Republic) Eliška Březinová	
(Romania) EduSport Trophy	(Italy) Marina Piredda	(Romania) Julia Sauter	(Lithuania) Aleksandra Golovkina	
Latvia Trophy	(Latvia) Sofja Stepčenko	(Georgia (country)) Alina Urushadze	(Latvia) Angelīna Kučvaļska	
(Serbia) Skate Helena	(Israel) Elizabet Gervitz	(Moldova) Anastasia Gracheva	(Croatia) Hana Cvijanović	
(Latvia) 51st Volvo Open Cup	(Latvia) Anastasija Konga	(Estonia) Kristina Lisovskaja	(Finland) Oona Ounasvuori	
(Turkey) Ephesus Cup	(Lithuania) Aleksandra Golovkina	(Moldova) Anastasia Gracheva	(Kazakhstan) Sofiya Farafonova	
(Iceland) Reykjavík International Games	(Iceland) Julia Sylvia Gunnarsdottir	(India) Tara Prasad	(Netherlands) Roos van der Pas	
(Bulgaria) Sofia Trophy	(Slovenia) Julija Lovrencic	(Spain) Emilia Murdock	(Austria) Emily Saari	
(Germany) Bavarian Open	(Switzerland) Livia Kaiser	(Israel) Elizabet Gervits	(Austria) Olga Mikutina	
(Lithuania) Icebeat Winter Trophy	(Latvia) Anastasija Konga	(Poland) Karolina Bialas	(Lithuania) Selina Kaneda	
(Sweden) Nordic Championships	(Sweden) Josefin Taljegård	(Norway) Mia Risa Gomez	(Finland) Olivia Lisko	
(Estonia) Lõunakeskus Trophy	(Estonia) Kristina Lisovskaja	(Lithuania) Aleksandra Golovkina	(Estonia) Karoliine Raudsepp	
(Slovenia) Dragon Trophy	(Austria) Olga Mikutina	(Italy) Lara Naki Gutmann	(Slovakia) Vanesa Šelmeková	
(Estonia) Tallink Hotels Cup	(Japan) Rion Sumiyoshi	(Japan) Hana Yoshida	(Japan) Mako Yamashita	
(United Arab Emirates) Abu Dhabi Classic Trophy	(Estonia) Nataly Langerbeur	(Kazakhstan) Sofiya Farafonova	(Kazakhstan) Anna Levkovets	
(Bosnia and Herzegovina) Sarajevo Open	(Croatia) Hana Cvijanovic	(Croatia) Lorena Cizmek	No other competitors	
(Romania) Bellu Memorial	(Slovakia) Ema Doboszova	(United Kingdom) Kristen Spours	(United Kingdom) Nina Povey	
(Netherlands) International Challenge Cup	(Japan) Kaori Sakamoto	(Japan) Yuna Aoki	(France) Lorine Schild	
(Italy) Merano Ice Trophy	(France) Léa Serna	(Italy) Lara Naki Gutmann	(Italy) Marina Piredda	
(Poland) Maria Olszewska Memorial	(Italy) Marina Piredda	(Estonia) Eva-Lotta Kiibus	(Poland) Karolina Bialas	
(Norway) Sonja Henie Trophy	(Italy) Lara Naki Gutmann	(Bulgaria) Alexandra Feigin	(Finland) Pihla Bergman	
(Luxembourg) Coupe du Printemps	(Estonia) Eva-Lotta Kiibus	(United Kingdom) Kristen Spours	(Slovakia) Ema Doboszová	
(Bulgaria) Black Sea Ice Cup	(Bulgaria) Kristina Grigorova	(United Kingdom) Genevieve Somerville	(United Kingdom) Arabella Sear-Watkins	
(Slovenia) Triglav Trophy	(Italy) Marina Piredda	(United Kingdom) Kristen Spours	(Slovenia) Julija Lovrenčič	
Thailand Open Trophy	(South Korea) Song Si-woo	(Hong Kong) Joanna So	(Hong Kong) Hiu Yau Chow	
Mexico Cup	(Mexico) Andrea Astrain Maynez	(Mexico) Eugenia Garza Martinez	(Mexico) Alejandra Osuna Tirado	
(Australia) Oceania International	(Australia) Danielle Gebser	(Australia) Ashley Colliver	(Greece) Dimitra Korri	

=== Pairs ===
Championships
Competition	Gold	Silver	Bronze	Ref.
(Lithuania) European Championships	(Italy); Lucrezia Beccari; Matteo Guarise	(Georgia (country)); Anastasiia Metelkina; Luka Berulava	(Italy); Rebecca Ghilardi; Filippo Ambrosini	
(China) Four Continents Championships	(Canada); Deanna Stellato-Dudek; Maxime Deschamps	(Japan); Riku Miura; Ryuichi Kihara	(United States); Ellie Kam; Danny O'Shea	
(Chinese Taipei) World Junior Championships	(Georgia (country)); Anastasiia Metelkina; Luka Berulava	(United States); Olivia Flores; Luke Wang	(United States); Naomi Williams; Lachlan Lewer	
(Canada) World Championships	(Canada); Deanna Stellato-Dudek; Maxime Deschamps	(Japan); Riku Miura; Ryuichi Kihara	(Germany); Minerva Fabienne Hase; Nikita Volodin	

Grand Prix
Competition	Gold	Silver	Bronze	Ref.
(United States) Skate America	(Germany); Annika Hocke; Robert Kunkel	(Canada); Lia Pereira; Trennt Michaud	(United States); Chelsea Liu; Balázs Nagy	
Skate Canada International	(Canada); Deanna Stellato-Dudek; Maxime Deschamps	(Hungary); Maria Pavlova; Alexei Sviatchenko	(Italy); Lucrezia Beccari; Matteo Guarise	
Grand Prix de France	(Canada); Lia Pereira; Trennt Michaud	(Italy); Sara Conti; Niccolò Macii	(France); Camille Kovalev; Pavel Kovalev	
Cup of China	(Canada); Deanna Stellato-Dudek; Maxime Deschamps	(Italy); Rebecca Ghilardi; Filippo Ambrosini	(China); Peng Cheng; Wang Lei	
(Finland) Grand Prix of Espoo	(Germany); Minerva Fabienne Hase; Nikita Volodin	(Italy); Sara Conti; Niccolò Macii	(Hungary); Maria Pavlova; Alexei Sviatchenko	
(Japan) NHK Trophy	(Germany); Minerva Fabienne Hase; Nikita Volodin	(Italy); Lucrezia Beccari; Matteo Guarise	(Italy); Rebecca Ghilardi; Filippo Ambrosini	
(China) Grand Prix Final	(Germany); Minerva Fabienne Hase; Nikita Volodin	(Italy); Sara Conti; Niccolò Macii	(Canada); Deanna Stellato-Dudek; Maxime Deschamps	

Junior Grand Prix
Competition	Gold	Silver	Bronze	Ref.
JGP Austria	(Canada); Martina Ariano Kent; Charly Laliberté Laurent	(United States); Olivia Flores; Luke Wang	(China); Shi Wenning; Wang Zhiyu	
JGP Turkey	(Georgia (country)); Anastasia Metelkina; Luka Berulava	(United States); Olivia Flores; Luke Wang	(Canada); Jazmine Desrochers; Kieran Thrasher	
JGP Hungary	(Georgia (country)); Anastasia Metelkina; Luka Berulava	(Ukraine); Violetta Sierova; Ivan Khobta	(Canada); Martina Ariano Kent; Charly Laliberté Laurent	
JGP Poland	(Canada); Ava Kemp; Yohnatan Elizarov	(Ukraine); Violetta Sierova; Ivan Khobta	(Canada); Jazmine Desrochers; Kieran Thrasher	
(China) Junior Grand Prix Final	(Georgia (country)); Anastasia Metelkina; Luka Berulava	(Canada); Ava Kemp; Yohnatan Elizarov	(Canada); Jazmine Desrochers; Kieran Thrasher	

Challenger Series
Competition	Gold	Silver	Bronze	Ref.
(Italy) Lombardia Trophy	(Italy); Sara Conti; Niccolò Macii	(Germany); Minerva Fabienne Hase; Nikita Volodin	(Germany); Annika Hocke; Robert Kunkel	
(Canada) Autumn Classic International	(Canada); Deanna Stellato-Dudek; Maxime Deschamps	(Japan); Riku Miura; Ryuichi Kihara	(Canada); Emmanuelle Proft; Nicolas Nadeau	
(Germany) Nebelhorn Trophy	(Germany); Minerva Fabienne Hase; Nikita Volodin	(Italy); Lucrezia Beccari; Matteo Guarise	(Germany); Annika Hocke; Robert Kunkel	
(Finland) Finlandia Trophy	(United States); Ellie Kam; Danny O'Shea	(Italy); Rebecca Ghilardi; Filippo Ambrosini	(Hungary); Maria Pavlova; Alexei Sviatchenko	
(Croatia) Golden Spin of Zagreb	(Finland); Milania Väänänen; Filippo Clerici	(United States); Valentina Plazas; Maximiliano Fernandez	(Ukraine); Sofiia Holichenko; Artem Darenskyi	

Other international competitions
Competition	Gold	Silver	Bronze	Ref.
(United States) John Nicks Pairs Challenge	(France); Camille Kovalev; Pavel Kovalev	(Italy); Anna Valesi; Manuel Piazza	(United States); Valentina Plazas; Maximiliano Fernandez	
(China) Shanghai Trophy	(China); Peng Cheng; Wang Lei	(Germany); Annika Hocke; Robert Kunkel	(China); Zhang Siyang; Yang Yongchao	
(Hungary) Budapest Trophy	(Germany); Minerva Fabienne Hase; Nikita Volodin	(Hungary); Maria Pavlova; Alexei Sviatchenko	(Netherlands); Daria Danilova; Michel Tsiba	
(United Kingdom) Tayside Trophy	(Italy); Sara Conti; Niccolò Macii	(United Kingdom); Anastasia Vaipan-Law; Luke Digby	(Finland); Milania Väänänen; Filippo Clerici	
(France) Trophée Métropole Nice Côte d'Azur	(France); Oxana Vouillamoz; Flavien Giniaux	(France); Océane Piegad; Denys Strekalin	(Austria); Sophia Schaller; Livio Mayr	
(Poland) Diamond Spin	(Italy); Rebecca Ghilardi; Filippo Ambrosini	(Poland); Ioulia Chtchetinina; Michał Woźniak	(Italy); Anna Valesi; Manuel Piazza	
(Poland) Warsaw Cup	(Georgia (country)); Anastasia Metelkina; Luka Berulava	(United Kingdom); Anastasia Vaipan-Law; Luke Digby	(Poland); Ioulia Chtchetinina; Michał Woźniak	
(Germany) Bavarian Open	(Netherlands); Daria Danilova; Michel Tsiba	(Poland); Ioulia Chtchetinina; Michał Woźniak	(Czech Republic); Barbora Kucianová; Martin Bidař	
(Netherlands) International Challenge Cup	(Italy); Sara Conti; Niccolò Macii	(Italy); Lucrezia Beccari; Matteo Guarise	(France); Camille Kovalev; Pavel Kovalev	

=== Ice dance ===
Championships
Competition	Gold	Silver	Bronze	Ref.
(Lithuania) European Championships	(Italy); Charlène Guignard; Marco Fabbri	(United Kingdom); Lilah Fear; Lewis Gibson	(Lithuania); Allison Reed; Saulius Ambrulevičius	
(China) Four Continents Championships	(Canada); Piper Gilles; Paul Poirier	(Canada); Laurence Fournier Beaudry; Nikolaj Sørensen	(United States); Christina Carreira; Anthony Ponomarenko	
(Chinese Taipei) World Junior Championships	(United States); Leah Neset; Artem Markelov	(Israel); Elizabeth Tkachenko; Alexei Kiliakov	(Germany); Darya Grimm; Michail Savitskiy	
(Canada) World Championships	(United States); Madison Chock; Evan Bates	(Canada); Piper Gilles; Paul Poirier	(Italy); Charlène Guignard; Marco Fabbri	

Grand Prix
Competition	Gold	Silver	Bronze	Ref.
(United States) Skate America	(United States); Madison Chock; Evan Bates	(Canada); Marjorie Lajoie; Zachary Lagha	(France); Evgenia Lopareva; Geoffrey Brissaud	
Skate Canada International	(Canada); Piper Gilles; Paul Poirier	(United Kingdom); Lilah Fear; Lewis Gibson	(Lithuania); Allison Reed; Saulius Ambrulevičius	
Grand Prix de France	(Italy); Charlène Guignard; Marco Fabbri	(Canada); Laurence Fournier Beaudry; Nikolaj Sørensen	(France); Evgenia Lopareva; Geoffrey Brissaud	
Cup of China	(Canada); Piper Gilles; Paul Poirier	(Canada); Marjorie Lajoie; Zachary Lagha	(United States); Caroline Green; Michael Parsons	
(Finland) Grand Prix of Espoo	(United States); Madison Chock; Evan Bates	(Canada); Laurence Fournier Beaudry; Nikolaj Sørensen	(Finland); Juulia Turkkila; Matthias Versluis	
(Japan) NHK Trophy	(United Kingdom); Lilah Fear; Lewis Gibson	(Italy); Charlène Guignard; Marco Fabbri	(Lithuania); Allison Reed; Saulius Ambrulevičius	
(China) Grand Prix Final	(United States); Madison Chock; Evan Bates	(Italy); Charlène Guignard; Marco Fabbri	(Canada); Piper Gilles; Paul Poirier	

Junior Grand Prix
Competition	Gold	Silver	Bronze	Ref.
JGP Thailand	(United States); Leah Neset; Artem Markelov	(France); Célina Fradji; Jean-Hans Fourneaux	(South Korea); Kim Jinny; Lee Na-mu	
JGP Austria	(Germany); Darya Grimm; Michail Savitskiy	(Canada); Chloe Nguyen; Brendan Giang	(United States); Elliana Peal; Ethan Peal	
JGP Turkey	(Ukraine); Mariia Pinchuk; Mykyta Pogorielov	(United States); Yahli Pedersen; Jeffrey Chen	(Switzerland); Gina Zehnder; Beda Leon Sieber	
JGP Japan	(United States); Leah Neset; Artem Markelov	(Israel); Elizabeth Tkachenko; Alexei Kiliakov	(France); Célina Fradji; Jean-Hans Fourneaux	
JGP Hungary	(Ukraine); Iryna Pidgaina; Artem Koval	(United States); Yahli Pedersen; Jeffrey Chen	(France); Dania Mouaden; Théo Bigot	
JGP Poland	(Germany); Darya Grimm; Michail Savitskiy	(Ukraine); Mariia Pinchuk; Mykyta Pogorielov	(Japan); Sara Kishimoto; Atsuhiko Tamura	
JGP Armenia	(Israel); Elizabeth Tkachenko; Alexei Kiliakov	(United States); Elliana Peal; Ethan Peal	(Italy); Noemi Maria Tali; Noah Lafornara	
(China) Junior Grand Prix Final	(United States); Leah Neset; Artem Markelov	(Israel); Elizabeth Tkachenko; Alexei Kiliakov	(Germany); Darya Grimm; Michail Savitskiy	

Challenger Series
Competition	Gold	Silver	Bronze	Ref.
(Italy) Lombardia Trophy	(Italy); Charlène Guignard; Marco Fabbri	(Czech Republic); Natálie Taschlerová; Filip Taschler	(Georgia (country)); Maria Kazakova; Georgy Reviya	
(Canada) Autumn Classic International	(United States); Eva Pate; Logan Bye	(France); Evgeniia Lopareva; Geoffrey Brissaud	(South Korea); Hannah Lim; Ye Quan	
(Germany) Nebelhorn Trophy	(United Kingdom); Lilah Fear; Lewis Gibson	(Lithuania); Allison Reed; Saulius Ambrulevičius	(Finland); Juulia Turkkila; Matthias Versluis	
(Slovakia) Nepela Memorial	(United Kingdom); Lilah Fear; Lewis Gibson	(Georgia (country)); Diana Davis; Gleb Smolkin	(Czech Republic); Natálie Taschlerová; Filip Taschler	
(Finland) Finlandia Trophy	(Finland); Juulia Turkkila; Matthias Versluis	(United States); Christina Carreira; Anthony Ponomarenko	(Canada); Laurence Fournier Beaudry; Nikolaj Sørensen	
(Hungary) Budapest Trophy	(Georgia (country)); Diana Davis; Gleb Smolkin	(Canada); Marie-Jade Lauriault; Romain Le Gac	(France); Loïcia Demougeot; Théo le Mercier	
(Kazakhstan) Denis Ten Memorial Challenge	(Georgia (country)); Diana Davis; Gleb Smolkin	(Germany); Jennifer Janse van Rensburg; Benjamin Steffan	(Ukraine); Mariia Pinchuk; Mykyta Pogorielov	
(Poland) Warsaw Cup	(France); Evgenia Lopareva; Geoffrey Brissaud	(South Korea); Hannah Lim; Ye Quan	(France); Marie Dupayage; Thomas Nabais	
(Croatia) Golden Spin of Zagreb	(Lithuania); Allison Reed; Saulius Ambrulevičius	(United States); Emilea Zingas; Vadym Kolesnik	(United States); Isabella Flores; Ivan Desyatov	

Other international competitions
Competition	Gold	Silver	Bronze	Ref.
(United States) Lake Placid Ice Dance International	(Georgia (country)); Diana Davis; Gleb Smolkin	(United States); Oona Brown; Gage Brown	(United States); Eva Pate; Logan Bye	
(China) Shanghai Trophy	(Italy); Charlène Guignard; Marco Fabbri	(France); Evgeniia Lopareva; Geoffrey Brissaud	(China); Wang Shiyue; Liu Xinyu	
(Italy) Mezzaluna Cup	(Finland); Yuka Orihara; Juho Pirinen	(France); Marie Dupayage; Thomas Nabais	(France); Natacha Lagouge; Arnaud Caffa	
(France) Trophée Métropole Nice Côte d'Azur	(Spain); Sofía Val; Asaf Kazimov	(Lithuania); Paulina Ramanauskaitė; Deividas Kizala	(China); Xiao Zixi; He Linghao	
(Switzerland) Swiss Ice Skating Open	(Finland); Juulia Turkkila; Matthias Versluis	(United Kingdom); Phebe Bekker; James Hernandez	(Italy); Victoria Manni; Carlo Röthlisberger	
(Czech Republic) Pavel Roman Memorial	(Ukraine); Mariia Pinchuk; Mykyta Pogorielov	(Hungary); Lucy Hancock; Ilias Fourati	(France); Eva Bernard; Amedeo Bonetto	
(Germany) NRW Trophy	(Estonia); Solène Mazingue; Marko Jevgeni Gaidajenko	(Italy); Giorgia Galimberti; Matteo-Libasse Mandelli	(Spain); Philomene Sabourin; Raul Bermejo	
(Turkey) Bosphorus Cup	(France); Marie Dupayage; Thomas Nabais	(Switzerland); Gina Zehnder; Beda Leon Sieber	(Spain); Sofía Val; Asaf Kazimov	
(Turkey) Ephesus Cup	(Spain); Sofía Val; Asaf Kazimov	(France); Lou Terreaux; Noé Perron	(Poland); Olivia Oliver; Filip Bojanowski	
(Germany) Bavarian Open	(Germany); Jennifer Janse van Rensburg; Benjamin Steffan	(France); Natacha Lagouge; Arnaud Caffa	(France); Lou Terreaux; Noé Perron	
(Italy) Egna Spring Trophy	(France); Marie Dupayage; Thomas Nabais	(United States); Isabella Flores; Ivan Desyatov	(Republic of Ireland); Carolane Soucisse; Shane Firus	
(Netherlands) International Challenge Cup	(France); Loïcia Demougeot; Théo le Mercier	(Spain); Olivia Smart; Tim Dieck	(Canada); Alicia Fabbri; Paul Ayer	

== Records and achievements ==
=== Records ===
Prior to the 2023–24 season, the ISU record scores were as follows:

Records prior to the 2023–24 season
Level	Segment	Discipline											
Level	Segment	Men's singles			Women's singles			Pairs			Ice dance		
Level	Segment	Skater	Score	Event	Skater	Score	Event	Team	Score	Event	Team	Score	Event
Senior	SP / RD	(United States); Nathan Chen	113.97	2022 Winter Olympics	(Russia); Kamila Valieva	87.52	2021 Rostelecom Cup	(China); Sui Wenjing; Han Cong	84.41	2022 Winter Olympics	(United States); Madison Chock; Evan Bates	93.91	2023 World Team Trophy
Senior	FS / FD	(United States); Nathan Chen	224.92	2019–20 Grand Prix Final	(Russia); Kamila Valieva	185.29	2021 Rostelecom Cup	(Russia); Anastasia Mishina; Aleksandr Galliamov	157.46	2022 European Championships	(United States); Madison Chock; Evan Bates	138.41	2023 World Team Trophy
Senior	Combined total	(United States); Nathan Chen	335.30	2019–20 Grand Prix Final	(Russia); Kamila Valieva	272.71	2021 Rostelecom Cup	(China); Sui Wenjing; Han Cong	239.88	2022 Winter Olympics	(United States); Madison Chock; Evan Bates	232.32	2023 World Team Trophy
Junior	SP / RD	(United States); Ilia Malinin	88.99	2022 World Junior Championships	(Russia); Alena Kostornaia	76.32	2018–19 Junior Grand Prix Final	(Russia); Apollinariia Panfilova; Dmitry Rylov	73.71	2020 World Junior Championships	(Czech Republic); Kateřina Mrázková; Daniel Mrázek	71.87	2022 JGP Italy
Junior	FS / FD	(United States); Ilia Malinin	187.12	2022 World Junior Championships	(Russia); Sofia Akateva	157.19	2021 JGP Russia	(Russia); Apollinariia Panfilova; Dmitry Rylov	127.47	2020 Winter Youth Olympics	(United States); Avonley Nguyen; Vadym Kolesnik	108.91	2020 World Junior Championships
Junior	Combined total	(United States); Ilia Malinin	276.11	2022 World Junior Championships	(Russia); Sofia Akateva	233.08	2021 JGP Russia	(Russia); Apollinariia Panfilova; Dmitry Rylov	199.21	2020 Winter Youth Olympics	(Czech Republic); Kateřina Mrázková; Daniel Mrázek	177.36	2023 World Junior Championships

The following new ISU best scores were set during this season:

New records set during the 2023–24 season
Disc.	Segment	Skater(s)	Score	Event	Date	Ref.
Ice dance (Junior)	Rhythm dance	(United States); Leah Neset; Artem Markelov	72.48	2023–24 Junior Grand Prix Final	December 8, 2023	
Pairs (Junior)	Free skating	(Georgia (country)); Anastasiia Metelkina; Luka Berulava	131.63	2023–24 Junior Grand Prix Final	December 9, 2023	
Pairs (Junior)	Combined total	(Georgia (country)); Anastasiia Metelkina; Luka Berulava	202.11	2023–24 Junior Grand Prix Final	December 9, 2023	
Men (Senior)	Free skating	(United States); Ilia Malinin	227.79	2024 World Championships	March 23, 2024	

=== Achievements ===
- At the Grand Prix Final, Ilia Malinin successfully performed a quadruple Axel during his short program; this was the first time that any skater had performed this jump during a short program. Malinin had successfully performed quadruple Axels in previous competitions, but only during the free skating segment. During the free skating, Malinin also successfully performed a quadruple loop, thus becoming the first skater to ever perform all six jumps as quadruples in competition.
- At the 2024 European Championships, Aleksandr Selevko was the first Estonian to win a medal (a silver medal) at the European Championships.
- At the 2024 World Championships, Deanna Stellato-Dudek of Canada became the oldest woman (at age 40) to ever win a gold medal at the World Championships.

== Season's best scores ==
=== Men's singles ===
As of March 23, 2024.

Top 10 season's best scores in the men's combined total
No.	Skater	Nation	Score	Event
1	Ilia Malinin	United States	333.76	2024 World Championships
2	Yuma Kagiyama	Japan	309.65	2024 World Championships
3	Adam Siao Him Fa	France	306.78	2023 Grand Prix de France
4	Shoma Uno	Japan	297.34	2023–24 Grand Prix Final
5	Kévin Aymoz	France	279.09	2023 Skate America
6	Shun Sato	Japan	274.59	2024 Four Continents Championships
7	Kao Miura	Japan	274.56	2023 Grand Prix of Espoo
8	Jason Brown	United States	274.33	2024 World Championships
9	Cha Jun-hwan	South Korea	272.95	2024 Four Continents Championships
10	Kazuki Tomono	Japan	265.78	2023 Nebelhorn Trophy

Top 10 season's best scores in the men's short program
No.	Skater	Nation	Score	Event
1	Shoma Uno	Japan	107.72	2024 World Championships
2	Ilia Malinin	United States	106.90	2023–24 Grand Prix Final
3	Yuma Kagiyama	Japan	106.82	2024 Four Continents Championships
4	Adam Siao Him Fa	France	101.07	2023 Grand Prix de France
5	Shun Sato	Japan	99.20	2024 Four Continents Championships
6	Kévin Aymoz	France	97.34	2023 Skate America
7	Cha Jun-hwan	South Korea	95.30	2024 Four Continents Championships
8	Kao Miura	Japan	94.86	2023–24 Grand Prix Final
9	Sōta Yamamoto	Japan	94.44	2024 Four Continents Championships
10	Jason Brown	United States	93.87	2024 World Championships

Top 10 season's best scores in the men's free skating
No.	Skater	Nation	Score	Event
1	Ilia Malinin	United States	227.79	2024 World Championships
2	Adam Siao Him Fa	France	207.17	2023 Cup of China
3	Yuma Kagiyama	Japan	203.30	2024 World Championships
4	Shoma Uno	Japan	191.32	2023–24 Grand Prix Final
5	Shun Sato	Japan	182.93	2023 Grand Prix of Espoo
6	Kévin Aymoz	France	181.75	2023 Skate America
7	Kao Miura	Japan	181.02	2023 Grand Prix of Espoo
8	Lukas Britschgi	Switzerland	180.68	2024 World Championships
9	Cha Jun-hwan	South Korea	177.65	2024 Four Continents Championships
10	Mikhail Shaidorov	Kazakhstan	174.52	2023 Cup of China

=== Women's singles ===
As of March 22, 2024.

Top 10 season's best scores in the women's combined total
No.	Skater	Nation	Score	Event
1	Kaori Sakamoto	Japan	226.13	2023 Skate Canada International
2	Loena Hendrickx	Belgium	221.28	2023 Skate America
3	Mao Shimada	Japan	218.36	2024 World Junior Championships
4	Mone Chiba	Japan	214.98	2024 Four Continents Championships
5	Shin Ji-a	South Korea	212.43	2024 World Junior Championships
6	Isabeau Levito	United States	212.16	2024 World Championships
7	Anastasiia Gubanova	Georgia	206.52	2024 European Championships
8	Kim Chae-yeon	South Korea	204.68	2024 Four Continents Championships
9	Hana Yoshida	Japan	203.97	2023 Cup of China
10	Rinka Watanabe	Japan	203.22	2023 Cup of China

Top 10 season's best scores in the women's short program
No.	Skater	Nation	Score	Event
1	Kaori Sakamoto	Japan	77.35	2023–24 Grand Prix Final
2	Loena Hendrickx	Belgium	76.98	2024 World Championships
3	Mao Shimada	Japan	73.78	2023 JGP Japan
4	Isabeau Levito	United States	73.73	2024 World Championships
5	Lee Hae-in	South Korea	73.55	2024 World Championships
6	Shin Ji-a	South Korea	73.48	2024 World Junior Championships
7	Amber Glenn	United States	71.45	2023 Skate America
8	Mone Chiba	Japan	71.10	2024 Four Continents Championships
9	Kim Chae-yeon	South Korea	70.31	2023 Skate Canada International
10	Kim Ye-lim	South Korea	70.20	2023 Finlandia Trophy

Top 10 season's best scores in the women's free skating
No.	Skater	Nation	Score	Event
1	Kaori Sakamoto	Japan	151.00	2023 Skate Canada International
2	Mao Shimada	Japan	145.76	2024 World Junior Championships
3	Loena Hendrickx	Belgium	145.36	2023 Skate America
4	Mone Chiba	Japan	143.88	2024 Four Continents Championships
5	Hana Yoshida	Japan	142.51	2023–24 Grand Prix Final
6	Shin Ji-a	South Korea	138.95	2024 World Junior Championships
7	Ava Marie Ziegler	United States	138.46	2023 NHK Trophy
8	Isabeau Levito	United States	138.43	2024 World Championships
9	Rinka Watanabe	Japan	138.13	2023 Cup of China
10	Anastasiia Gubanova	Georgia	137.56	2024 European Championships

=== Pairs ===
As of March 21, 2024.

Top 10 season's best scores in the pairs' combined total
No.	Team	Nation	Score	Event
1	Deanna Stellato-Dudek; Maxime Deschamps	Canada	221.56	2024 World Championships
2	Riku Miura; Ryuichi Kihara	Japan	217.88	2024 World Championships
3	Minerva Fabienne Hase; Nikita Volodin	Germany	210.40	2024 World Championships
4	Sara Conti; Niccolò Macii	Italy	205.88	2023–24 Grand Prix Final
5	Maria Pavlova; Alexei Sviatchenko	Hungary	204.60	2024 World Championships
6	Anastasia Metelkina; Luka Berulava	Georgia	202.11	2023–24 Junior Grand Prix Final
7	Lucrezia Beccari; Matteo Guarise	Italy	199.19	2024 European Championships
8	Annika Hocke; Robert Kunkel	Germany	198.23	2024 World Championships
9	Rebecca Ghilardi; Filippo Ambrosini	Italy	195.68	2024 European Championships
10	Lia Pereira; Trennt Michaud	Canada	194.67	2023 Grand Prix de France

Top 10 season's best scores in the pairs' short program
No.	Team	Nation	Score	Event
1	Deanna Stellato-Dudek; Maxime Deschamps	Canada	77.48	2024 World Championships
2	Riku Miura; Ryuichi Kihara	Japan	73.53	2024 World Championships
3	Sara Conti; Niccolò Macii	Italy	72.88	2024 World Championships
4	Minerva Fabienne Hase; Nikita Volodin	Germany	72.56	2023–24 Grand Prix Final
5	Anastasia Metelkina; Luka Berulava	Georgia	72.02	2024 World Championships
6	Maria Pavlova; Alexei Sviatchenko	Hungary	68.01	2024 World Championships
7	Annika Hocke; Robert Kunkel	Germany	67.64	2024 World Championships
8	Lucrezia Beccari; Matteo Guarise	Italy	67.05	2024 European Championships
9	Rebecca Ghilardi; Filippo Ambrosini	Italy	66.33	2023 Cup of China
10	Lia Pereira; Trennt Michaud	Canada	65.97	2023 Grand Prix de France

Top 10 season's best scores in the pairs' free skating
No.	Team	Nation	Score	Event
1	Riku Miura; Ryuichi Kihara	Japan	144.35	2024 World Championships
2	Deanna Stellato-Dudek; Maxime Deschamps	Canada	144.08	2024 World Championships
3	Minerva Fabienne Hase; Nikita Volodin	Germany	138.30	2024 World Championships
4	Maria Pavlova; Alexei Sviatchenko	Hungary	136.59	2024 World Championships
5	Sara Conti; Niccolò Macii	Italy	135.58	2023–24 Grand Prix Final
6	Lucrezia Beccari; Matteo Guarise	Italy	132.14	2024 European Championships
7	Anastasiia Metelkina; Luka Berulava	Georgia	131.63	2023–24 Junior Grand Prix Final
8	Rebecca Ghilardi; Filippo Ambrosini	Italy	130.81	2024 European Championships
9	Annika Hocke; Robert Kunkel	Germany	130.59	2024 World Championships
10	Lia Pereira; Trennt Michaud	Canada	128.70	2023 Grand Prix de France

=== Ice dance ===
As of March 23, 2024.

Top 10 season's best scores in the combined total (ice dance)
No.	Team	Nation	Score	Event
1	Madison Chock; Evan Bates	United States	222.20	2024 World Championships
2	Piper Gilles; Paul Poirier	Canada	219.68	2024 World Championships
3	Charlène Guignard; Marco Fabbri	Italy	216.52	2024 World Championships
4	Lilah Fear; Lewis Gibson	Great Britain	215.19	2023 NHK Trophy
5	Marjorie Lajoie; Zachary Lagha	Canada	208.01	2024 World Championships
6	Laurence Fournier Beaudry; Nikolaj Sørensen	Canada	207.54	2024 Four Continents Championships
7	Allison Reed; Saulius Ambrulevičius	Lithuania	203.37	2024 European Championships
8	Christina Carreira; Anthony Ponomarenko	United States	200.32	2024 World Championships
9	Evgeniia Lopareva; Geoffrey Brissaud	France	197.17	2024 European Championships
10	Juulia Turkkila; Matthias Versluis	Finland	195.80	2023 Grand Prix of Espoo

Top 10 season's best scores in the rhythm dance
No.	Team	Nation	Score	Event
1	Madison Chock; Evan Bates	United States	90.08	2024 World Championships
2	Piper Gilles; Paul Poirier	Canada	87.55	2023 Skate Canada International
3	Charlène Guignard; Marco Fabbri	Italy	87.52	2024 World Championships
4	Lilah Fear; Lewis Gibson	Great Britain	85.20	2024 European Championships
5	Laurence Fournier Beaudry; Nikolaj Sørensen	Canada	82.62	2023 Grand Prix of Espoo
6	Marjorie Lajoie; Zachary Lagha	Canada	82.30	2024 World Championships
7	Allison Reed; Saulius Ambrulevičius	Lithuania	81.19	2023 Golden Spin of Zagreb
8	Evgeniia Lopareva; Geoffrey Brissaud	France	80.01	2024 World Championships
9	Christina Carreira; Anthony Ponomarenko	United States	79.26	2024 World Championships
10	Emilea Zingas; Vadym Kolesnik	United States	78.23	2023 Golden Spin of Zagreb

Top 10 season's best scores in the free dance
No.	Team	Nation	Score	Event
1	Piper Gilles; Paul Poirier	Canada	133.14	2024 World Championships
2	Madison Chock; Evan Bates	United States	132.46	2023–24 Grand Prix Final
3	Lilah Fear; Lewis Gibson	Great Britain	130.26	2023 NHK Trophy
4	Charlène Guignard; Marco Fabbri	Italy	129.69	2023–24 Grand Prix Final
5	Marjorie Lajoie; Zachary Lagha	Canada	125.71	2024 World Championships
6	Laurence Fournier Beaudry; Nikolaj Sørensen	Canada	125.52	2024 Four Continents Championships
7	Allison Reed; Saulius Ambrulevičius	Lithuania	122.64	2024 European Championships
8	Christina Carreira; Anthony Ponomarenko	United States	121.06	2024 World Championships
9	Evgeniia Lopareva; Geoffrey Brissaud	France	120.27	2024 World Championships
10	Marie-Jade Lauriault; Romain Le Gac	Canada	119.57	2024 Four Continents Championships

== Current season's world rankings ==
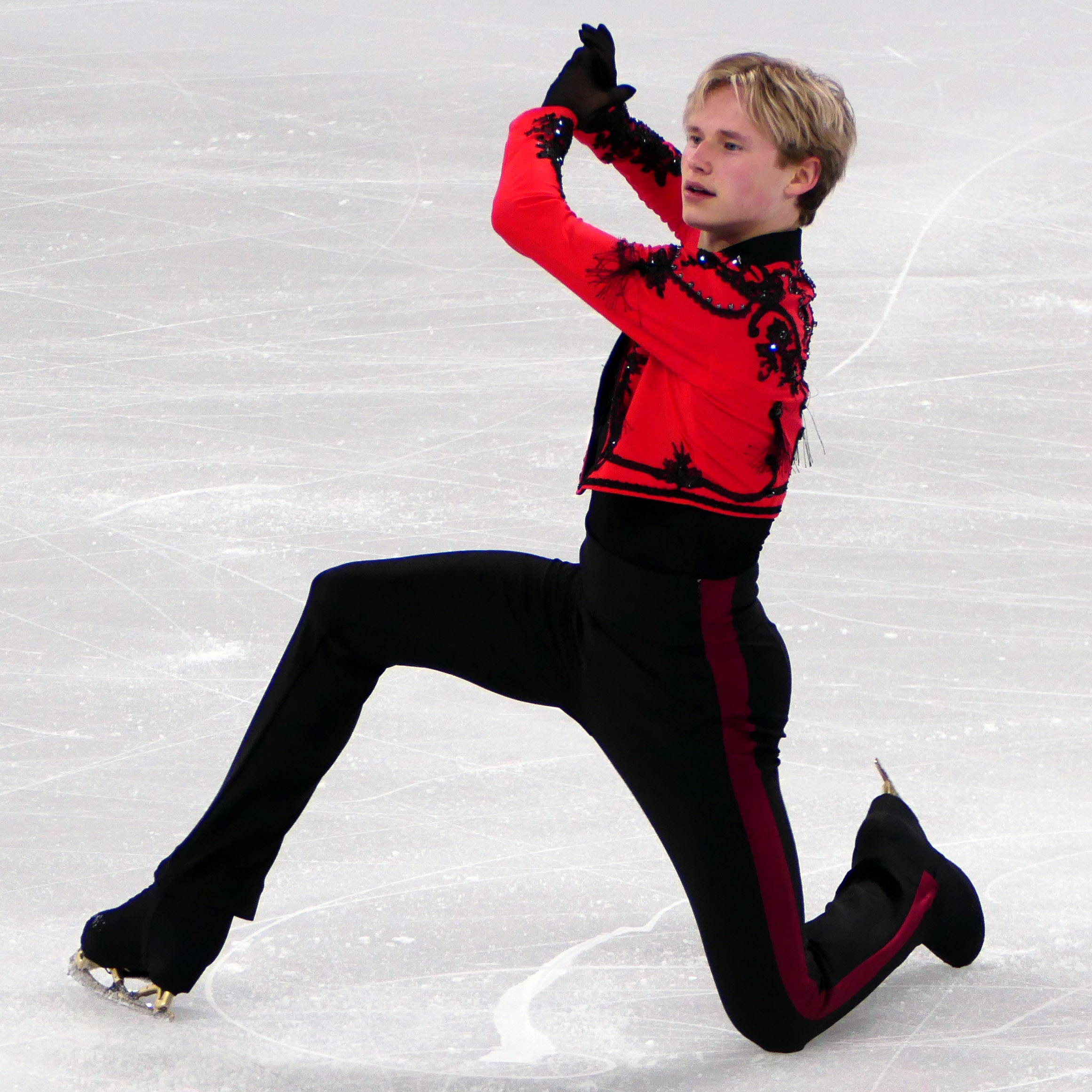
Ilia Malinin of the United States was the highest ranked men's singles skater during the 2023–24 season.

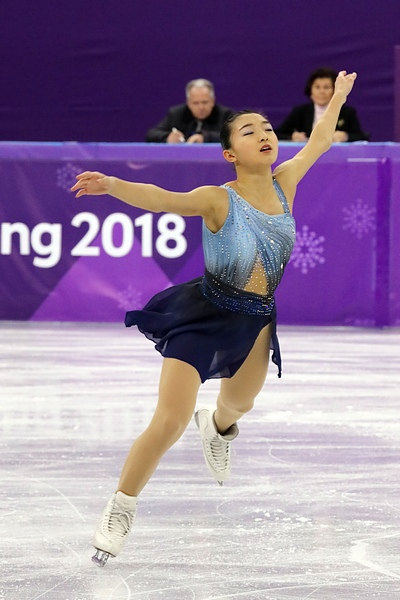
Kaori Sakamoto of Japan was the highest ranked women's singles skater during the 2023–24 season.

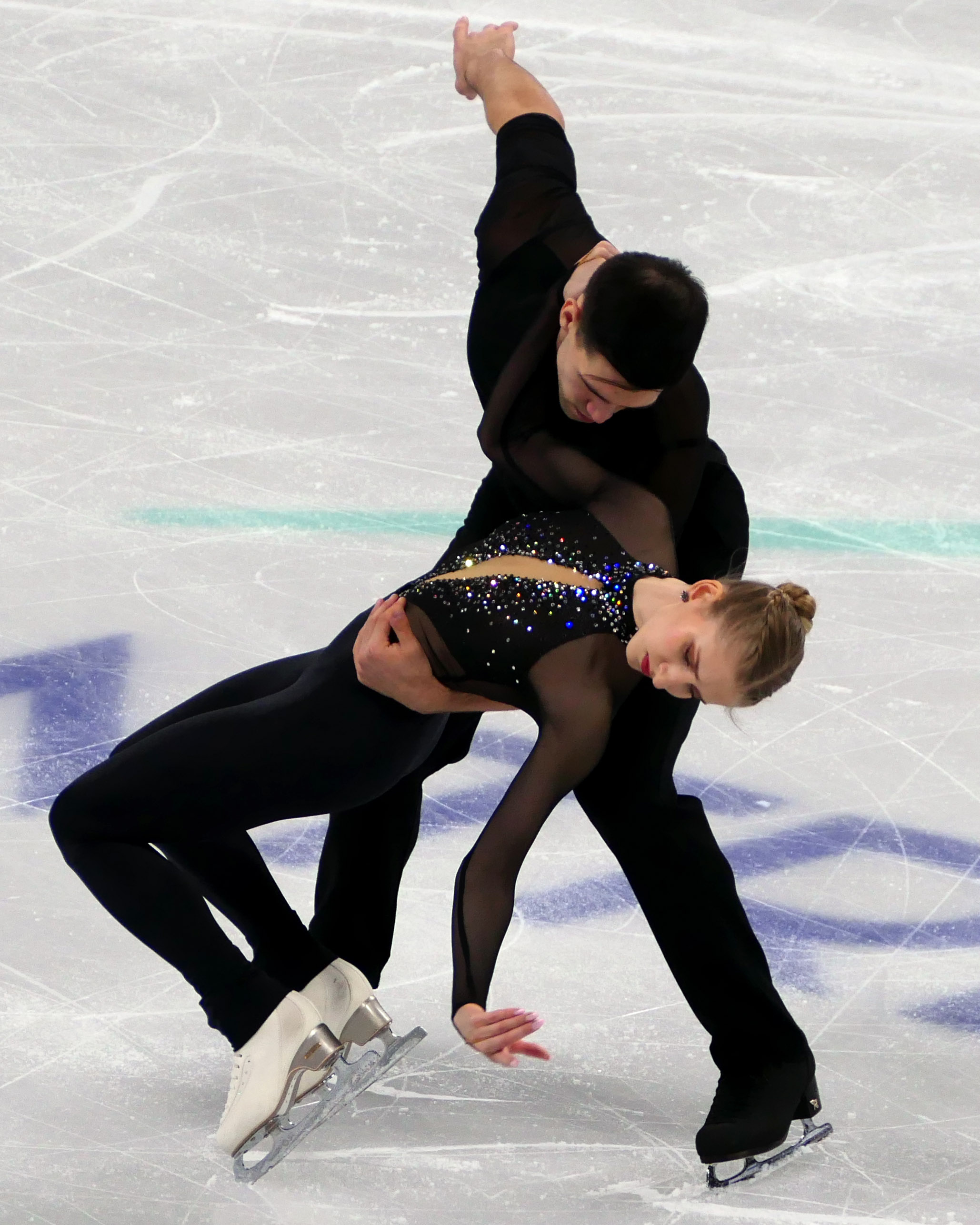
Minerva Fabienne Hase and Nikita Volodin of Germany were the highest ranked pair skaters during the 2023–24 season.

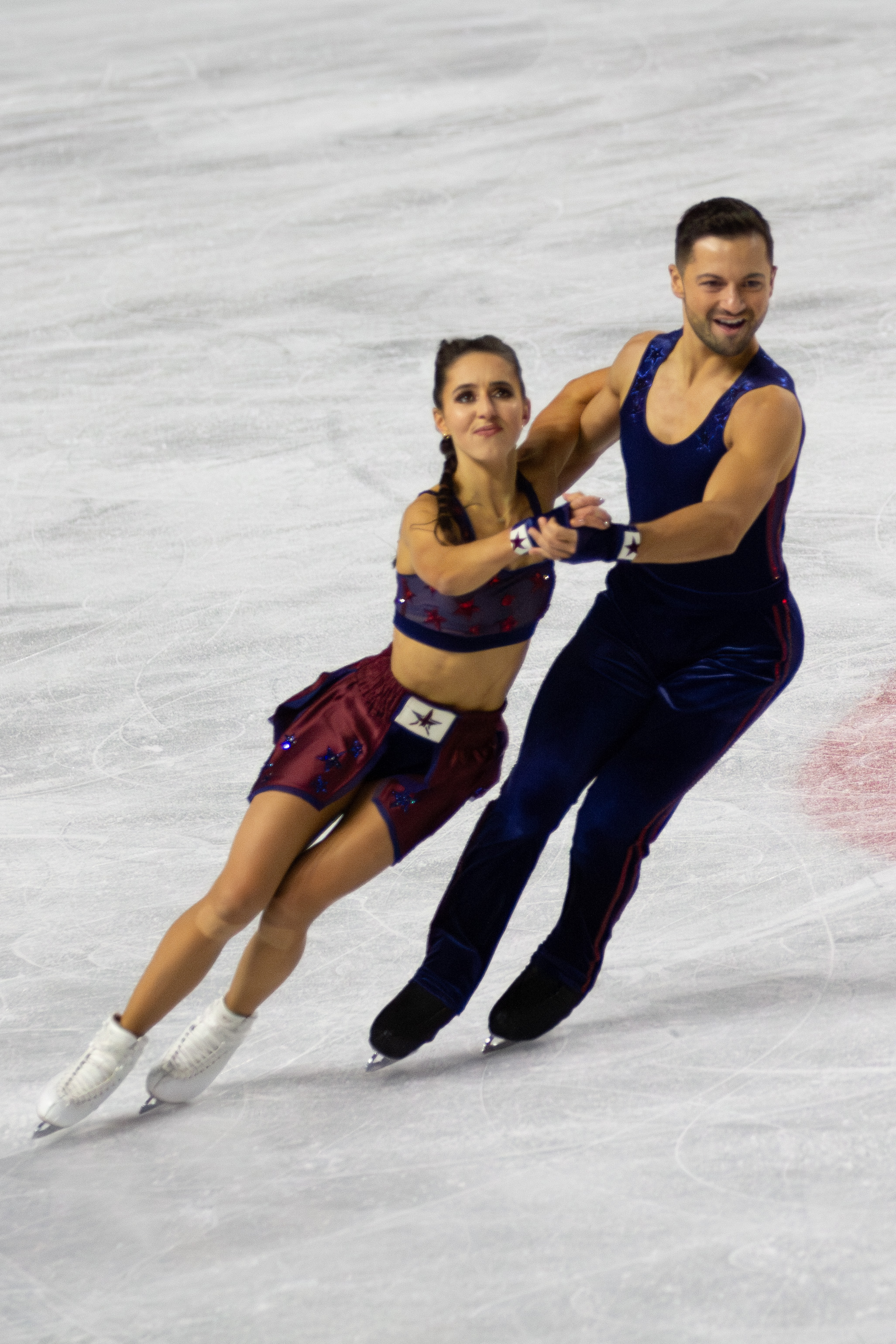
Lilah Fear and Lewis Gibson of Great Britain were the highest ranked ice dancers during the 2023–24 season.

=== Men's singles ===
As of June 1, 2024.

Men's singles
No.	Skater	Nation
1	Ilia Malinin	United States
2	Adam Siao Him Fa	France
3	Yuma Kagiyama	Japan
4	Kao Miura	Japan
5	Lukas Britschgi	Switzerland
6	Shun Sato	Japan
7	Gabriele Frangipani	Italy
8	Mikhail Shaidorov	Kazakhstan
9	Nika Egadze	Georgia
10	Sōta Yamamoto	Japan

=== Women's singles ===
As of June 1, 2024.

Women's singles
No.	Skater	Nation
1	Kaori Sakamoto	Japan
2	Isabeau Levito	United States
3	Kim Chae-yeon	South Korea
4	Hana Yoshida	Japan
5	Loena Hendrickx	Belgium
6	Anastasiia Gubanova	Georgia
7	Nina Pinzarrone	Belgium
8	Lee Hae-in	South Korea
9	Rinka Watanabe	Japan
10	Ava Marie Ziegler	United States

=== Pairs ===
As of June 1, 2024.

Pairs
No.	Team	Nation
1	Minerva Fabienne Hase; Nikita Volodin	Germany
2	Deanna Stellato-Dudek; Maxime Deschamps	Canada
3	Sara Conti; Niccolò Macii	Italy
4	Maria Pavlova; Alexei Sviatchenko	Hungary
5	Rebecca Ghilardi; Filippo Ambrosini	Italy
6	Lucrezia Beccari; Matteo Guarise	Italy
7	Annika Hocke; Robert Kunkel	Germany
8	Lia Pereira; Trennt Michaud	Canada
9	Anastasiia Metelkina; Luka Berulava	Georgia
10	Valentina Plazas; Maximiliano Fernandez	United States

=== Ice dance ===
As of June 1, 2024.

Ice dance
No.	Team	Nation
1	Lilah Fear; Lewis Gibson	Great Britain
2	Madison Chock; Evan Bates	United States
3	Charlène Guignard; Marco Fabbri	Italy
4	Piper Gilles; Paul Poirier	Canada
5	Allison Reed; Saulius Ambrulevičius	Lithuania
6	Laurence Fournier Beaudry; Nikolaj Sørensen	Canada
7	Evgeniia Lopareva; Geoffrey Brissaud	France
8	Marjorie Lajoie; Zachary Lagha	Canada
9	Christina Carreira; Anthony Ponomarenko	United States
10	Juulia Turkkila; Matthias Versluis	Finland

== World standings ==
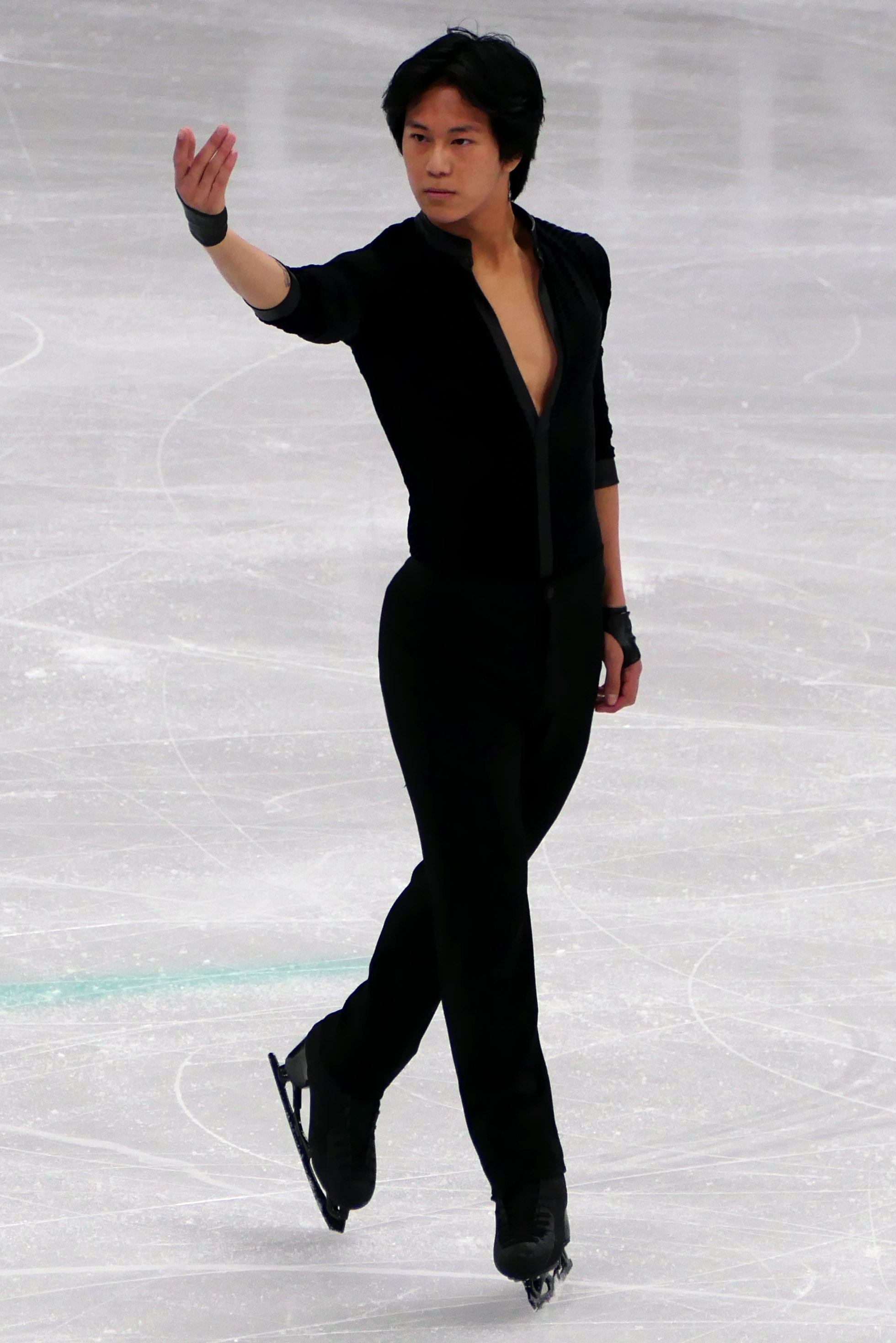
Adam Siao Him Fa of France was the second-highest ranked men's singles skater after the 2023–24 season.

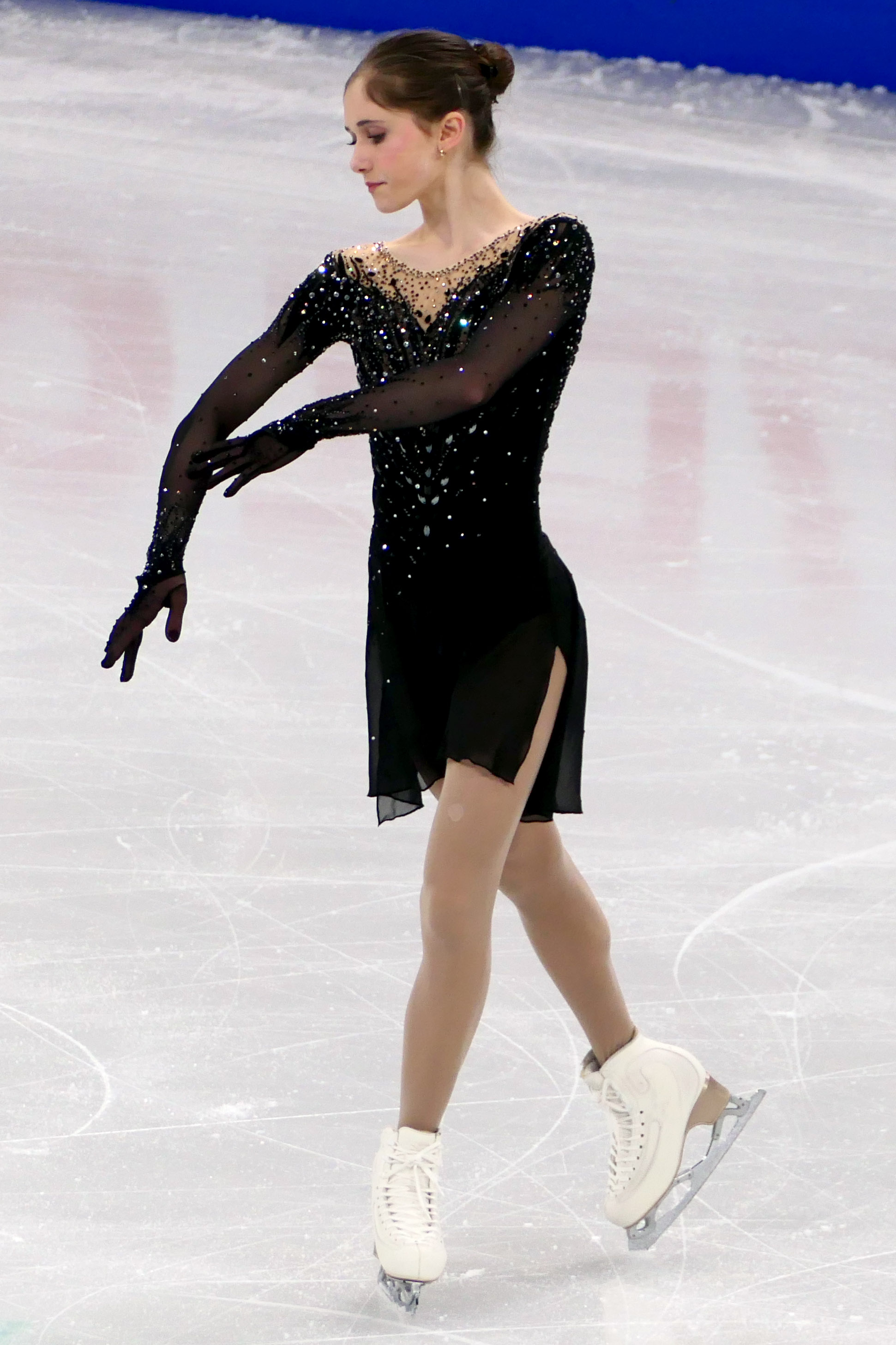
Isabeau Levito of the United States was the second-highest ranked women's singles skater after the 2023–24 season.

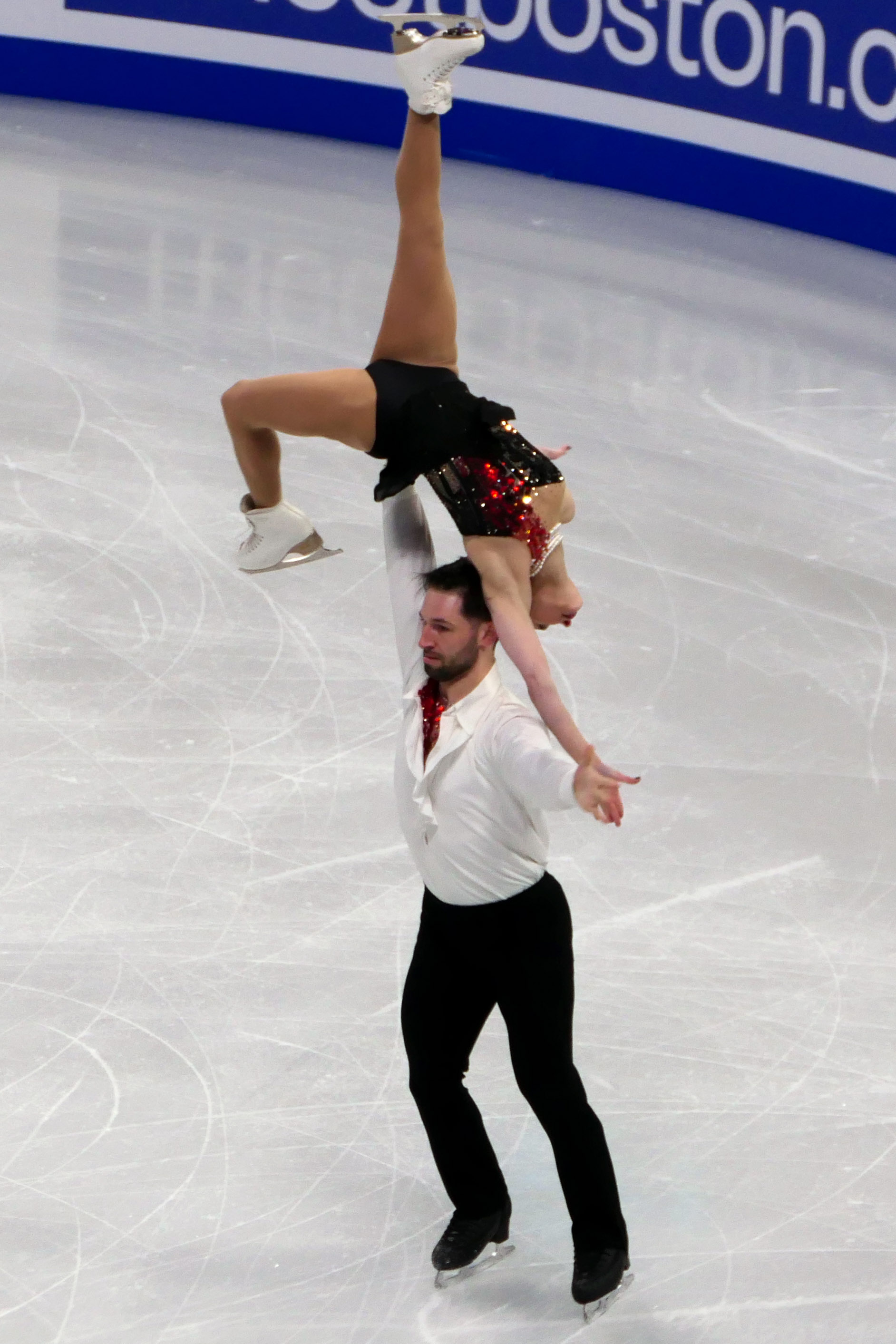
Deanna Stellato-Dudek and Maxime Deschamps of Canada were the highest ranked pair skaters after the 2023–24 season.

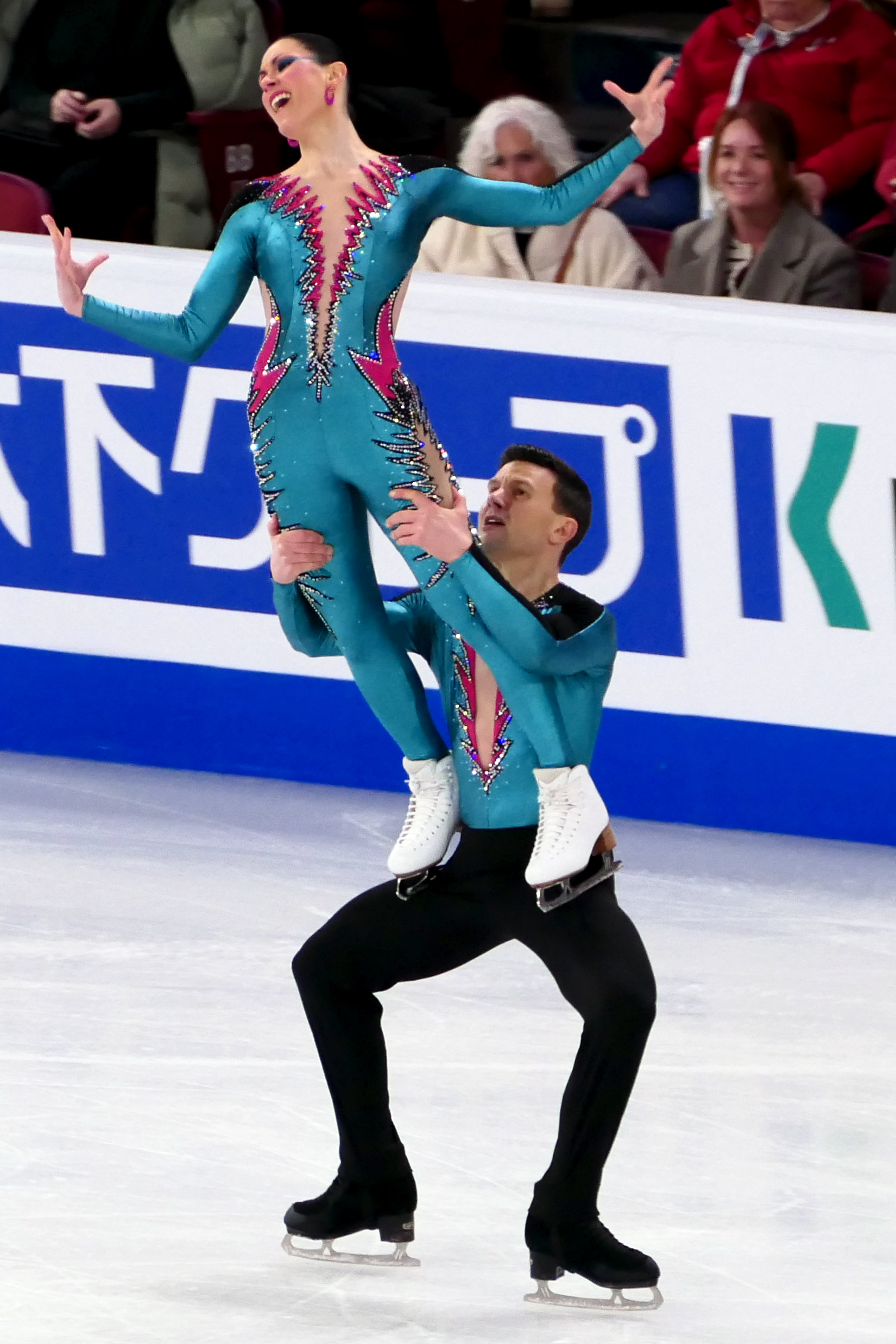
Charlène Guignard and Marco Fabbri of Italy were the highest ranked ice dancers after the 2023–24 season.

=== Men's singles ===
As of March 24, 2024.

Men's singles
No.	Skater	Nation
1	Ilia Malinin	United States
2	Adam Siao Him Fa	France
3	Shoma Uno	Japan
4	Yuma Kagiyama	Japan
5	Kao Miura	Japan
6	Shun Sato	Japan
7	Cha Jun-hwan	South Korea
8	Lukas Britschgi	Switzerland
9	Matteo Rizzo	Italy
10	Sōta Yamamoto	Japan

=== Women's singles ===
As of March 23, 2024.

Women's singles
No.	Skater	Nation
1	Kaori Sakamoto	Japan
2	Isabeau Levito	United States
3	Loena Hendrickx	Belgium
4	Lee Hae-in	South Korea
5	Kim Chae-yeon	South Korea
6	Anastasiia Gubanova	Georgia
7	Rinka Watanabe	Japan
8	Kim Ye-lim	South Korea
9	Hana Yoshida	Japan
10	Mai Mihara	Japan

=== Pairs ===
As of March 22, 2024.

Pairs
No.	Team	Nation
1	Deanna Stellato-Dudek; Maxime Deschamps	Canada
2	Sara Conti; Niccolò Macii	Italy
3	Riku Miura; Ryuichi Kihara	Japan
4	Rebecca Ghilardi; Filippo Ambrosini	Italy
5	Alexa Knierim; Brandon Frazier	United States
6	Annika Hocke; Robert Kunkel	Germany
7	Maria Pavlova; Alexei Sviatchenko	Hungary
8	Valentina Plazas; Maximiliano Fernandez	United States
9	Emily Chan; Spencer Akira Howe	United States
10	Minerva Fabienne Hase; Nikita Volodin	Germany

=== Ice dance ===
As of March 23, 2024.

Ice dance
No.	Team	Nation
1	Charlène Guignard; Marco Fabbri	Italy
2	Madison Chock; Evan Bates	United States
3	Lilah Fear; Lewis Gibson	Great Britain
4	Piper Gilles; Paul Poirier	Canada
5	Laurence Fournier Beaudry; Nikolaj Sørensen	Canada
6	Marjorie Lajoie; Zachary Lagha	Canada
7	Allison Reed; Saulius Ambrulevičius	Lithuania
8	Evgenia Lopareva; Geoffrey Brissaud	France
9	Christina Carreira; Anthony Ponomarenko	United States
10	Juulia Turkkila; Matthias Versluis	Finland
