= Sherlock Holmes: A Game of Shadows (soundtrack) =

Sherlock Holmes: A Game of Shadows – Original Motion Picture Soundtrack

Soundtrack album by Hans Zimmer
- Released: 13 December 2011
- Studios: MG Sound Studios, Vienna; AIR Studios, London
- Genre: Film score
- Length: 57:22
- Label: WaterTower Music
- Producers: Hans Zimmer; Lorne Balfe

Sherlock Holmes: A Game of Shadows – Original Motion Picture Soundtrack is the soundtrack album to the 2011 film of the same name. Hans Zimmer collaborated again with Lorne Balfe to produce the score. It was released on 13 December 2011, three days before the film was released itself.

Musically, the album is influenced by classical and Romani music.

While reading page five of the script, Zimmer came to a part about a Gypsy fortuneteller. He called the director, Guy Ritchie and told him they needed to do a road trip to Slovakia. Zimmer felt that it was appropriate to reflect the Romani culture in his music. Zimmer got two Romani bands (Cigánski baróni and Kokavakere Lavutára - Sendreiovci) to record the score for the film, resulting in the score for the film as envisioned.

He said:

"You have two cultures collide on the soundtrack, that you go from this typical heavy Germanic action music to just the frivolity of one of those Gypsy songs, full of life, full of lightness, full of spirit, I had a problem with authority from a very early age."

== Track listing ==
All music is composed by Hans Zimmer except where indicated.

| No. | Title | Length |
|---|---|---|
| 1. | "I See Everything" | 0:39 |
| 2. | "That Is My Curse (Shadows – Part 1)" | 1:51 |
| 3. | "Tick Tock (Shadows – Part 2)" | 8:12 |
| 4. | "Chess (Shadows – Part 3)" | 7:34 |
| 5. | "It's So Overt It's Covert" | 3:19 |
| 6. | "Romanian Wind" | 1:56 |
| 7. | "Did You Kill My Wife?" | 2:42 |
| 8. | "He's All Me Me Me" | 1:56 |
| 9. | "The Mycroft Suite" | 1:41 |
| 10. | "To the Opera!" | 4:03 |
| 11. | "The Braying Mule" (music by Ennio Morricone) | 2:34 |
| 12. | "Die Forelle" (written by Franz Schubert) (performed by Julius Drake and Ian Bostridge) | 3:22 |
| 13. | "Zu viele Füchse für euch Hänsel" | 1:47 |
| 14. | "The Red Book" | 4:00 |
| 15. | "Moral Insanity" | 1:31 |
| 16. | "Memories of Sherlock" | 2:11 |
| 17. | "The End?" | 2:26 |
| 18. | "Romani Holiday" (Antonious Remix) | 5:38 |
| Total length: | | 57:22 |

Deluxe Version
| No. | Title | Length |
|---|---|---|
| 19. | "Shush Club No. 3" | 4:31 |
| 20. | "Beautiful Eyes" | 2:13 |
| 21. | "Just Follow My Lead (The Waltz)" | 4:44 |
| Total length: | | 11:28 |

Tracks not included on the album:

- "Fischerweise, D.881" written by Franz Schubert.
- "Congress Reel" (not performed by Poitín) (Prior Incorrect Entry: "The Dubliners - The Rocky Road to Dublin".)

Notes

- "To the Opera!" incorporates elements from "Ultima Prova", "Ah, Signor Per Carita" and "Don Giovanni a Cenar Teco" from Don Giovanni by Wolfgang Amadeus Mozart.
- "Two Mules for Sister Sara" is the theme from the film of the same name starring Clint Eastwood and Shirley MacLaine.
- "Just Follow My Lead (The Waltz)" contains elements from "Wiener Blut" composed by Johann Strauss II and "Accelerationen, Op. 234" written by Johann Strauss II.
- "Die Forelle" differs from the version used in the film.

== Release ==
Purchase of the enhanced physical CD includes an insert allowing the free download of three bonus tracks from the score: "Shush Club No. 3", "Beautiful Eyes" and "Just Follow My Lead (The Waltz)".

== Reception ==
Professional ratings
Review scores
| Source | Rating |
|---|---|
| Allmusic | 4.5/5 stars |
| Filmtracks.com | 1/5 stars |
| Film, Music & Media | 3.5/4 stars |

Allmusic rated the album 4.5 out of 5 stars, cited by James Christopher Monger that the soundtrack "once again infused the series with wit and wickedness, stacking his already established themes with an effusive Romanian flair, reflecting the addition of Girl with the Dragon Tattoo star Noomi Rapace's turn as a Gypsy fortune teller."

On the other hand, Filmtracks.com gave the album 1 out of 5 stars, stating that it "completely lacks major development of new motifs and does little to expand upon the two-part theme from the original film."
