= Incantation (British band) =

South American tribal band

- Origin: London, England
- Years active: 1981–present
- Past members: Tony Hinnigan; Mike Taylor; Forbes Henderson; Simon Rogers; Chris Swithinbank; Claudia Figuerora; Sergio Avila; Mauricio Venegas

Incantation are a musical group playing traditional tribal and other South American music. The band started in 1981 from a pool of musicians who were, at the time, playing all kinds of different types of music for the (then) Ballet Rambert, based in London. A new ballet was choreographed (called "Ghost Dances") about political oppression in South America, to the music of Inti-Illimani, the exiled Chilean folk group. The company preferred to use live musicians (rather than tapes) for performances, and six of the musicians volunteered.

Authentic instruments were procured, and some time was spent perfecting how to play them. The show was a hit and before long the band was offered a recording contract by Coda Records, a subsidiary of Beggars Banquet Records. Incantation was chosen as the band's name, based on the word "Inca".

Members of the various incarnations of the band include Tony Hinnigan (Scottish), Mike Taylor (Irish), Forbes Henderson (English), Simon Rogers (English), Chris Swithinbank, and Chileans Claudia Figuerora, Sergio Avila and Mauricio Venegas. They achieved success in the UK Singles Chart in 1982 with the top twenty hit "Cacharpaya (Andes Pumpsá Dèsi)". They later contributed the traditional instruments (including pan pipes) to the soundtracks of the films Willow and Field of Dreams (both scored by James Horner), as well as The Mission (scored by Ennio Morricone) and A Handful of Dust (scored by George Fenton).

== Discography ==
=== Studio albums ===
Year	Album	UK	Certifications
1982	On the Wing of a Condor	—	
1982	Cacharpaya (Panpipes of the Andes)	9	BPI: Gold
1983	Dance of the Flames	61	
1984	Virgins of the Sun	—	
1987	The Meeting	—	
1992	On Gentle Rocks	—	
1994	Songs for the Seasons	—	
1995	Incantation	—	
"—" denotes releases that did not chart.

=== Compilation albums ===
Year	Album	UK	Certifications
1985	Best of Incantation - Music from the Andes	28	BPI: Silver
1996	The Very Best of Incantation	—	
1998	Geoglyph (The Very Best of Incantation)	—	
"—" denotes releases that did not chart.

=== Singles ===
Year	Song	UK
1982	"Cacharpaya (Andes Pumpsa Daesi)"	12
1983	"Sikuriadas"	—
1983	"Canarios" (EP)	—
1984	"Pipe Dance (Congalongadingdong)"	—
1987	"Scarborough Fair"	—
"—" denotes releases that did not chart.
