= Selevko =

Selevko is a surname. Notable people with the surname include:

- Aleksandr Selevko (born 2001), Estonian figure skater
- Mihhail Selevko (born 2002), Estonian figure skater
