= 2022 CS Finlandia Trophy =

- Type: ISU Challenger Series
- Date: October 4 – 9
- Season: 2022–23
- Location: Espoo, Finland
- Host: Suomen Taitoluisteluliitto
- Venue: Espoo Metro Areena

Champions
- Men's singles: (South Korea) Cha Jun-hwan
- Women's singles: (South Korea) Kim Ye-lim
- Pairs: (Germany) Annika Hocke / Robert Kunkel
- Ice dance: (Canada) Laurence Fournier Beaudry / Nikolaj Sørensen
- Previous: 2021 CS Finlandia Trophy
- Next: 2023 CS Finlandia Trophy
- Previous CS: 2022 CS Nepela Memorial
- Next CS: 2022 CS Budapest Trophy

The 2022 CS Finlandia Trophy was held on October 4–9, 2022, in Espoo, Finland. It was the fifth event of the 2022–23 ISU Challenger Series. Medals were awarded in men's singles, women's singles, pair skating, and ice dance.

== Entries ==
The International Skating Union published the list of entries on September 13, 2022.

Country	Men	Women	Pairs	Ice dance
Austria		Olga Mikutina		
Belgium		Jade Hovine		
Canada	Conrad Orzel	Lia Pereira	Brooke McIntosh / Benjamin Mimar	Laurence Fournier Beaudry / Nikolaj Sørensen
Chinese Taipei		Amanda Hsu		
Croatia		Dora Hus		
Czech Republic				Natálie Taschlerová / Filip Taschler
Denmark		Maia Sørensen		
Estonia	Arlet Levandi; Mihhail Selevko	Eva-Lotta Kiibus; Kristina Škuleta-Gromova		
Finland	Makar Suntsev; Valtter Virtanen	Linnea Ceder; Janna Jyrkinen; Oona Ounasvuori; Nella Pelkonen		Yuka Orihara / Juho Pirinen; Juulia Turkkila / Matthias Versluis
Georgia	Morisi Kvitelashvili	Anastasiia Gubanova		
Germany	Kai Jagoda; Nikita Starostin		Alisa Efimova / Ruben Blommaert; Annika Hocke / Robert Kunkel; Letizia Roscher / Luis Schuster	
Great Britain		Natasha McKay	Anastasia Vaipan-Law / Luke Digby	
India		Tara Prasad		
Israel		Ella Chen		
Kazakhstan	Mikhail Shaidorov			
Lithuania				Paulina Ramanauskaitė / Deividas Kizala
Netherlands		Lindsay van Zundert	Daria Danilova / Michel Tsiba	
Philippines			Isabella Gamez / Alexander Korovin	
Spain	Pablo Garcia			
South Korea	Cha Jun-hwan; Kim Hyun-gyeom; Kyeong Jae-seok	Kim Chae-yeon; Kim Ye-lim; Lee Hae-in		
Sweden	Nikolaj Majorov; Andreas Nordebäck	Josefin Taljegård		
Switzerland	Lukas Britschgi	Alexia Paganini		
Thailand		Thita Lamsam		
Ukraine	Kyrylo Marsak; Mykhailo Rudkovskyi; Ivan Shmuratko	Mariia Andriichuk		
United States	Dinh Tran	Hannah Lofton; Lindsay Thorngren	Maria Mokhova / Ivan Mokhov; Valentina Plazas / Maximiliano Fernandez; Anastasiia Smirnova / Danylo Siianytsia	Caroline Green / Michael Parsons; Kaitlin Hawayek / Jean-Luc Baker; Angela Ling / Caleb Wein

=== Changes to preliminary assignments ===
Date	Discipline	Withdrew	Added	Notes	Ref.
September 28	Men	(Israel) Mark Gorodnitsky	—		
September 28	Women	(Serbia) Antonina Dubinina	—		
September 28	Pairs	(Georgia (country)) Anastasiia Metelkina / Daniil Parkman	—		
September 28	Pairs	(Netherlands) Nika Osipova / Dmitry Epstein	—		
September 28	Ice dance	(Estonia) Alexandra Samersova / Kevin Ojala	—	Ojala retired.	
September 28	Ice dance	(Israel) Mariia Nosovitskaya / Mikhail Nosovitskiy	—		
October 3	Women	(Lithuania) Jogailė Aglinskytė	—		
October 3	Women	(Sweden) Emelie Ling	—		
October 3	Ice dance	(Estonia) Solène Mazingue / Marko Jevgeni Gaidajenko	—		
October 3	Ice dance	(Georgia (country)) Maria Kazakova / Georgy Reviya	—		
October 4	Men	(Azerbaijan) Vladimir Litvintsev	—		

== Results ==
=== Men's singles ===
Rank	Skater	Nation	Total points	SP		FS	
1st place, gold medalist(s)	Cha Jun-hwan	South Korea	253.20	1	91.06	1	162.14
2nd place, silver medalist(s)	Morisi Kvitelashvili	Georgia	231.30	2	80.16	2	151.14
3rd place, bronze medalist(s)	Andreas Nordebäck	Sweden	229.88	4	78.92	3	150.96
4	Mihhail Selevko	Estonia	220.33	3	79.79	6	140.54
5	Lukas Britschgi	Switzerland	216.42	10	66.62	4	149.80
6	Ivan Shmuratko	Ukraine	216.25	5	72.18	5	144.07
7	Nikolaj Majorov	Sweden	202.89	9	67.94	7	134.95
8	Mikhail Shaidorov	Kazakhstan	201.52	7	69.19	8	132.33
9	Kyeong Jae-seok	South Korea	200.53	8	68.65	9	131.88
10	Arlet Levandi	Estonia	197.28	11	65.97	10	131.31
11	Conrad Orzel	Canada	193.15	6	71.58	13	121.57
12	Kim Hyun-gyeom	South Korea	192.98	13	63.87	11	129.11
13	Dinh Tran	United States	191.34	15	62.52	12	128.82
14	Valtter Virtanen	Finland	185.19	12	63.91	14	121.28
15	Nikita Starostin	Germany	179.63	14	63.03	15	116.60
16	Makar Suntsev	Finland	177.17	17	62.04	16	115.13
17	Kai Jagoda	Germany	166.41	18	57.29	17	109.12
18	Kyrylo Marsak	Ukraine	152.16	16	62.09	19	90.07
19	Pablo Garcia	Spain	131.22	19	45.44	20	85.78
20	Mykhailo Rudkovskyi	Ukraine	129.93	20	38.68	18	91.25

=== Women's singles ===
Rank	Skater	Nation	Total points	SP		FS	
1st place, gold medalist(s)	Kim Ye-lim	South Korea	213.97	1	71.88	1	142.09
2nd place, silver medalist(s)	Kim Chae-yeon	South Korea	205.51	3	67.84	2	137.67
3rd place, bronze medalist(s)	Anastasiia Gubanova	Georgia	197.56	2	68.03	4	129.53
4	Lee Hae-in	South Korea	195.72	4	66.00	3	129.72
5	Alexia Paganini	Switzerland	165.71	7	57.09	6	108.62
6	Lindsay Thorngren	United States	165.09	14	52.86	5	112.23
7	Lindsay van Zundert	Netherlands	164.81	6	59.22	8	105.59
8	Josefin Taljegård	Sweden	163.76	5	59.51	9	104.25
9	Olga Mikutina	Austria	160.43	15	52.81	7	107.62
10	Janna Jyrkinen	Finland	157.64	12	53.75	10	103.89
11	Linnea Ceder	Finland	155.95	9	56.19	12	99.76
12	Eva-Lotta Kiibus	Estonia	153.35	13	53.17	11	100.18
13	Kristina Škuleta-Gromova	Estonia	147.68	11	54.41	14	93.27
14	Nella Pelkonen	Finland	142.44	10	55.44	16	87.00
15	Lia Pereira	Canada	142.07	8	56.98	18	85.09
16	Natasha McKay	Great Britain	139.22	16	45.80	13	93.42
17	Jade Hovine	Belgium	131.25	22	42.65	15	88.60
18	Mariia Andriichuk	Ukraine	131.08	18	44.84	17	86.24
19	Oona Ounasvuori	Finland	127.43	17	45.31	20	82.12
20	Ella Chen	Israel	127.30	21	42.93	19	84.37
21	Maia Sørensen	Denmark	123.26	20	44.00	21	79.26
22	Tara Prasad	India	122.75	19	44.26	22	78.49
23	Hannah Lofton	United States	109.90	23	40.77	24	69.13
24	Amanda Hsu	Chinese Taipei	109.66	24	34.71	23	74.95
25	Thita Lamsam	Thailand	79.93	25	30.99	25	48.94
WD	Dora Hus	Croatia	withdrew from competition				

=== Pairs ===
Rank	Team	Nation	Total points	SP		FS	
1st place, gold medalist(s)	Annika Hocke / Robert Kunkel	Germany	180.62	1	63.58	1	117.04
2nd place, silver medalist(s)	Alisa Efimova / Ruben Blommaert	Germany	177.11	2	62.54	2	114.57
3rd place, bronze medalist(s)	Brooke McIntosh / Benjamin Mimar	Canada	166.61	3	61.23	4	105.38
4	Letizia Roscher / Luis Schuster	Germany	165.58	5	59.21	3	106.37
5	Valentina Plazas / Maximiliano Fernandez	United States	161.98	4	60.40	6	101.58
6	Daria Danilova / Michel Tsiba	Netherlands	158.92	6	56.27	5	102.65
7	Anastasiia Smirnova / Danylo Siianytsia	United States	152.88	7	54.50	7	98.38
8	Maria Mokhova / Ivan Mokhov	United States	145.20	8	51.73	8	93.47
9	Isabella Gamez / Alexander Korovin	Philippines	122.40	9	44.25	9	78.15
10	Anastasia Vaipan-Law / Luke Digby	Great Britain	111.68	10	40.79	10	70.89

=== Ice dance ===
Rank	Team	Nation	Total points	RD		FD	
1st place, gold medalist(s)	Laurence Fournier Beaudry / Nikolaj Sørensen	Canada	203.76	1	81.83	1	121.93
2nd place, silver medalist(s)	Kaitlin Hawayek / Jean-Luc Baker	United States	197.45	2	78.90	2	118.55
3rd place, bronze medalist(s)	Juulia Turkkila / Matthias Versluis	Finland	186.30	3	74.35	3	111.95
4	Natálie Taschlerová / Filip Taschler	Czech Republic	178.85	4	72.79	4	106.06
5	Caroline Green / Michael Parsons	United States	177.34	5	72.64	5	104.70
6	Yuka Orihara / Juho Pirinen	Finland	170.17	6	68.81	6	101.36
7	Angela Ling / Caleb Wein	United States	140.83	7	61.51	8	79.32
8	Paulina Ramanauskaitė / Deividas Kizala	Lithuania	134.97	8	54.50	7	80.47
