= 2021–22 ISU Junior Grand Prix =

- Type: ISU Junior Grand Prix
- Date: August 18 – December 12, 2021
- Season: 2021–22
- Previous: 2020–21 ISU Junior Grand Prix
- Next: 2022–23 ISU Junior Grand Prix

The 2021–22 ISU Junior Grand Prix was a series of junior international competitions organized by the International Skating Union that were held from August 2021 through December 2021. It was the junior-level complement to the 2021–22 ISU Grand Prix of Figure Skating. Medals were awarded in men's singles, women's singles, pair skating, and ice dance. Skaters earned points based on their placement at each event and the top six in each discipline qualified to compete at the 2021–22 Junior Grand Prix Final in Osaka, Japan. Ultimately, the Grand Prix Final was cancelled due to the COVID-19 pandemic.

== Impact of the COVID-19 pandemic ==
On June 23, 2021, Skate Canada cancelled the second event of the series that it had been scheduled to host in Edmonton, Alberta, citing concerns surrounding the COVID-19 pandemic. The Fédération Française des Sports de Glace, the host of the series' first event in Courchevel, offered to replace Skate Canada as host by holding a second, separate JGP event in Courchevel on the originally scheduled dates.

On June 23, the Japan Skating Federation announced that due to pandemic-related travel restrictions, it would not be sending athletes to any of the first three JGP events. The JSF ultimately chose to forego the JGP series entirely and did not send athletes to any of the events. The Chinese Skating Association also did not send athletes to any of the events due to the mandatory quarantine period upon returning home.

On August 5, the ISU announced that due to varying travel and quarantine restrictions during the pandemic, it would consider re-allocation requests on a case-by-case basis according to an outlined criteria of preference. The ISU also said that they would abandon the re-allocation process in the event of an abundance of requests or overly complex requests that would cause logistical issues. In addition, the ISU decided to not implement a JGP ranking for the season and to instead prioritize holding the JGP series safely "with the best possible participation" in light of the pandemic.

On August 10, the Figure Skating Federation of Russia (FFKKR) announced that due to quarantine and vaccination requirements for Russian citizens entering France, it would not be able to send skaters to either of the first two events in Courchevel. As a result, the FFKKR asked the ISU to redistribute the quotas of Russian figure skaters from both stages in France to other stages of the series in countries where entry was possible without restrictive quarantine measures; the ISU Council agreed with the proposals. Russia received an additional two entries in singles and ice dance at the third JGP event in Slovakia and at the fourth JGP event in Russia.

== Competitions ==
The locations of the JGP events change yearly. Skate Canada was originally scheduled to host the second JGP event in Edmonton, Alberta, but cancelled the event due to uncertainties surrounding the COVID-19 pandemic. The Fédération Française des Sports de Glace instead hosted two back-to-back JGP events in Courchevel. The pairs event scheduled for Canada was reassigned to Poland.

During the fourth JGP event in Russia, the rhythm dance, the first event on the opening day, was suspended after one team had performed due to technical issues. The event later resumed at 22:00 after the remainder of the day's events were completed.

This season, the series was composed of the following events.

Date	Event	Location	Notes	Results
August 18–21	2021 JGP France I	Courchevel, France	No pairs	Details
August 25–28	2021 JGP France II	Courchevel, France	No pairs	Details
September 1–4	2021 JGP Slovakia	Košice, Slovakia		Details
September 15–18	2021 JGP Russia	Krasnoyarsk, Russia		Details
September 22–25	2021 JGP Slovenia	Ljubljana, Slovenia	No pairs	Details
September 29 – October 2	2021 JGP Poland	Gdańsk, Poland		Details
October 6–9	2021 JGP Austria	Linz, Austria		Details
December 9–12	(Japan) 2021–22 JGP Final	Cancelled		

== Entries ==
Skaters who reached the age of 13 before July 1, 2021, but had not turned 19 (singles skaters and female pairs or ice dance skaters) or 21 (male pairs or ice dance skaters) were eligible to compete on the junior circuit. Competitors were chosen by their countries according to their federations' selection procedures. The number of entries allotted to each ISU member federation was to have been determined by their skaters' placements at the 2021 World Junior Championships in each discipline; however, the World Junior Championships were cancelled.

=== Number of entries per discipline ===
Based on the results of the 2020 World Junior Championships, each ISU member nation was allowed to field the following number of entries per event.

Singles and ice dance
Entries	Men	Women	Ice dance
Two entries in seven events	Russia; Japan; Italy	Russia; United States; South Korea	United States; Georgia; Russia
One entry in seven events	United States; France; Estonia	Poland; Canada; Azerbaijan	France; Canada; Japan
One entry in six events	South Korea; Canada; Sweden; Ukraine	Japan; Belarus; Italy; Austria	Great Britain; Ukraine; Czech Republic; Italy
One entry in five events	Georgia; Turkey; Germany; Israel; Kazakhstan; Belarus; Czech Republic	France; Chinese Taipei; Georgia; Germany; Ukraine; Latvia; China; Bulgaria; Hungary	Spain; Hungary; Cyprus
One entry in four events	Austria; Great Britain; Chinese Taipei; Australia; Poland; Spain	Finland; Israel; Sweden; Netherlands; Spain	Germany; Kazakhstan; Israel; Azerbaijan; Estonia
One entry in three events	Switzerland; Croatia; Slovakia; Finland	Switzerland; Estonia; Hong Kong; Iceland; Armenia; Slovakia; Mexico; Denmark; Great Britain; Lithuania; Australia; Croatia; Serbia; New Zealand; Czech Republic; Romania	Poland; Belarus; Denmark; Switzerland

- If not listed above, one entry in two events is allowed.
- Host federations may enter up to three spots per discipline.

Pairs
Entries	Pairs
Three entries in four events	Russia; Germany; France; United States
Two entries in four events	Georgia; China; Canada; Ukraine; Sweden; Italy

- If not listed above, one entry in three events is allowed.
- Host federations have an unlimited number of entries.

== Medal summary ==
=== Men's singles ===
Competition	Gold	Silver	Bronze	Results
JGP France I	(United States) Ilia Malinin	(United States) Lucas Broussard	(France) François Pitot	Details
JGP France II	(Canada) Wesley Chiu	(Estonia) Arlet Levandi	(United Kingdom) Edward Appleby	Details
JGP Slovakia	(Russia) Kirill Sarnovskiy	(Russia) Ilya Yablokov	(United States) William Annis	Details
JGP Russia	(Russia) Gleb Lutfullin	(Russia) Egor Rukhin	(Canada) Wesley Chiu	Details
JGP Slovenia	(Russia) Ilya Yablokov	(Estonia) Arlet Levandi	(United States) Matthew Nielsen	Details
JGP Poland	(Russia) Gleb Lutfullin	(Kazakhstan) Mikhail Shaidorov	(Russia) Egor Rukhin	Details
JGP Austria	(United States) Ilia Malinin	(Russia) Artem Kovalev	(Russia) Kirill Sarnovskiy	Details

=== Women's singles ===
Competition	Gold	Silver	Bronze	Results
JGP France I	(United States) Lindsay Thorngren	(Canada) Kaiya Ruiter	(United States) Clare Seo	Details
JGP France II	(United States) Isabeau Levito	(South Korea) Kim Chae-yeon	(Canada) Kaiya Ruiter	Details
JGP Slovakia	(Russia) Veronika Zhilina	(Russia) Sofia Muravieva	(Russia) Adeliia Petrosian	Details
JGP Russia	(Russia) Sofia Akateva	(Russia) Anastasia Zinina	(Russia) Sofia Samodelkina	Details
JGP Slovenia	(Russia) Adeliia Petrosian	(Russia) Sofia Samodelkina	(United States) Lindsay Thorngren	Details
JGP Poland	(Russia) Sofia Akateva	(Russia) Elizaveta Kulikova	(South Korea) Shin Ji-a	Details
JGP Austria	(Russia) Sofia Muravieva	(United States) Isabeau Levito	(Russia) Anastasia Zinina	Details

=== Pairs ===
Competition	Gold	Silver	Bronze	Results
JGP Slovakia	(Russia) Anastasia Mukhortova / Dmitry Evgenyev	(Georgia (country)) Karina Safina / Luka Berulava	(Russia) Polina Kostiukovich / Aleksei Briukhanov	Details
JGP Russia	(Russia) Ekaterina Chikmareva / Matvei Ianchenkov	(Russia) Natalia Khabibullina / Ilya Knyazhuk	(Russia) Ekaterina Petushkova / Evgenii Malikov	Details
JGP Poland	(Russia) Ekaterina Chikmareva / Matvei Ianchenkov	(Russia) Ekaterina Petushkova / Evgenii Malikov	(Russia) Polina Kostiukovich / Aleksei Briukhanov	Details
JGP Austria	(Russia) Natalia Khabibullina / Ilya Knyazhuk	(Russia) Anastasia Mukhortova / Dmitry Evgenyev	(Georgia (country)) Karina Safina / Luka Berulava	Details

=== Ice dance ===
Competition	Gold	Silver	Bronze	Results
JGP France I	(United States) Katarina Wolfkostin / Jeffrey Chen	(Canada) Miku Makita / Tyler Gunara	(South Korea) Hannah Lim / Ye Quan	Details
JGP France II	(United States) Oona Brown / Gage Brown	(United States) Isabella Flores / Dimitry Tsarevski	(Estonia) Solène Mazingue / Marko Jevgeni Gaidajenko	Details
JGP Slovakia	(Canada) Natalie D'Alessandro / Bruce Waddell	(Russia) Vasilisa Kaganovskaia / Valeriy Angelopol	(Russia) Sofya Tyutyunina / Alexander Shustitskiy	Details
JGP Russia	(Russia) Irina Khavronina / Dario Cirisano	(Russia) Sofia Leonteva / Daniil Gorelkin	(United States) Angela Ling / Caleb Wein	Details
JGP Slovenia	(Russia) Vasilisa Kaganovskaia / Valeriy Angelopol	(United States) Katarina Wolfkostin / Jeffrey Chen	(Canada) Natalie D'Alessandro / Bruce Waddell	Details
JGP Poland	(Russia) Irina Khavronina / Dario Cirisano	(United States) Isabella Flores / Dimitry Tsarevski	(Cyprus) Angelina Kudryavtseva / Ilia Karankevich	Details
JGP Austria	(Russia) Sofya Tyutyunina / Alexander Shustitskiy	(United States) Oona Brown / Gage Brown	(Canada) Nadiia Bashynska / Peter Beaumont	Details

== Medal table ==
Rank	Nation	Gold	Silver	Bronze	Total
1	Russia	17	12	9	38
2	United States	6	6	5	17
3	Canada	2	2	4	8
4	Estonia	0	2	1	3
5	South Korea	0	1	2	3
6	Georgia	0	1	1	2
7	Kazakhstan	0	1	0	1
8	Cyprus	0	0	1	1
8	France	0	0	1	1
8	Great Britain	0	0	1	1
Totals (10 entries)		25	25	25	75

== Qualification ==
Due to the ongoing COVID-19 pandemic, the ISU chose not to implement JGP rankings for the 2021–22 season. On October 4, the ISU announced the alternative qualification procedure for the Junior Grand Prix Final in December. In addition to the below procedure, Japan, as the host of the Junior Grand Prix Final, was awarded a Wild Card berth in men's and women's singles.

For singles and ice dance

1. The seven winners of each individual JGP event would qualify for the Final.
2. Should there only be six different individual winners out of the seven individual JGP events because a skater or team won two JGP events, the six individual winners would qualify for the Final.
3. Should there be fewer than six different individual winners out of the seven individual JGP events because more skaters or teams won two JGP events, all of the individual winners would qualify for the Final. In addition, the best second-placed skater or team, and so forth by total score, who were not yet qualified as a winner, would be invited to the Final in order to reach a total of six entries.

For pairs

1. The four winners of each individual JGP event would qualify for the Final.
2. Should there be fewer than four different individual winners out of the four individual JGP events because a team won two JGP events, all of the individual winners would qualify for the Final. In addition, the best second-placed team, and so forth by total score, who were not yet qualified as a winner, would be invited to the Final in order to reach a total of four entries.

=== Qualifiers ===
No.	Men	Women	Pairs	Ice dance
1	(United States) Ilia Malinin	(Russia) Sofia Akateva	(Russia) Ekaterina Chikmareva / Matvei Ianchenkov	(Russia) Irina Khavronina / Dario Cirisano
2	(Russia) Ilya Yablokov	(Russia) Veronika Zhilina	(Russia) Natalia Khabibullina / Ilya Knyazhuk	(Russia) Vasilisa Kaganovskaia / Valeriy Angelopol
3	(Russia) Gleb Lutfullin	(Russia) Sofia Muravieva	(Russia) Anastasia Mukhortova / Dmitry Evgenyev	(United States) Katarina Wolfkostin / Jeffrey Chen
4	(Russia) Kirill Sarnovskiy	(Russia) Adeliia Petrosian	(Russia) Ekaterina Petushkova / Evgenii Malikov	(Canada) Natalie D'Alessandro / Bruce Waddell
5	(Canada) Wesley Chiu	~~(United States) Isabeau Levito~~ (withdrew)	—N/a	(Russia) Sofya Tyutyunina / Alexander Shustitskiy
6	(Russia) Egor Rukhin	(United States) Lindsay Thorngren	—N/a	(United States) Oona Brown / Gage Brown
Wild Card	(Japan) Lucas Tsuyoshi Honda	(Japan) Rion Sumiyoshi	—N/a	—N/a

Alternates

No.	Men	Women	Pairs	Ice dance
1	(Russia) Artem Kovalev	(Russia) Anastasia Zinina (called up)	(Georgia (country)) Karina Safina / Luka Berulava	(Russia) Sofia Leonteva / Daniil Gorelkin
2	(Kazakhstan) Mikhail Shaidorov	(Russia) Sofia Samodelkina	(Russia) Polina Kostiukovich / Aleksei Briukhanov	(United States) Isabella Flores / Dimitry Tsarevski
3	(Estonia) Arlet Levandi	(South Korea) Kim Chae-yeon	(Russia) Ekaterina Storublevtseva / Artem Gritsaenko	(Canada) Miku Makita / Tyler Gunara

== Records and achievements ==
=== Records ===
The following new junior ISU best scores were set during this season:

Disc.	Segment	Skater(s)	Score	Event	Date	Ref.
Women	Free skating	(Russia) Sofia Akateva	157.19	2021 JGP Russia	September 18, 2021	
Women	Total score	(Russia) Sofia Akateva	233.08	2021 JGP Russia	September 18, 2021	

=== Achievements ===
- At the JGP France I, Hannah Lim and Ye Quan were the first South Korean and the first Asian ice dance team to win an ISU Junior Grand Prix medal (a bronze medal).
- At the JGP France II, Arlet Levandi was the first Estonian men's singles skater to win an ISU Grand Prix medal (a silver medal) at either the junior or senior level.
- At the JGP Slovakia, Karina Safina and Luka Berulava were the first Georgian pairs team to win an ISU Grand Prix medal (a silver medal) at either the junior or senior level.
- At the JGP Poland, Angelina Kudryavtseva and Ilia Karankevich won Cyprus's first ISU Grand Prix medal (a bronze medal) at either the junior or senior level in any discipline.

== Top scores ==
=== Men's singles ===
Top 10 best scores in the men's combined total
No.	Skater	Nation	Score	Event
1	Ilia Malinin	United States	245.35	2021 JGP Austria
2	Ilya Yablokov	Russia	231.99	2021 JGP Slovenia
3	Gleb Lutfullin	Russia	231.26	2021 JGP Poland
4	Egor Rukhin	Russia	223.29	2021 JGP Russia
5	Artem Kovalev	Russia	221.51	2021 JGP Austria
6	Wesley Chiu	Canada	217.59	2021 JGP Russia
7	Kirill Sarnovskiy	Russia	216.70	2021 JGP Austria
8	Mikhail Shaidorov	Kazakhstan	207.03	2021 JGP Poland
9	William Annis	United States	204.60	2021 JGP Slovakia
10	Fedor Zonov	Russia	201.28	2021 JGP Russia

Top 10 best scores in the men's short program
No.	Skater	Nation	Score	Event
1	Artem Kovalev	Russia	81.31	2021 JGP Russia
1	Ilia Malinin	United States	81.31	2021 JGP Austria
3	Gleb Lutfullin	Russia	80.13	2021 JGP Russia
4	Ilya Yablokov	Russia	78.89	2021 JGP Slovenia
5	Egor Rukhin	Russia	78.43	2021 JGP Russia
6	Wesley Chiu	Canada	76.63	2021 JGP Russia
6	Corey Circelli	Canada	76.63	2021 JGP France I
8	William Annis	United States	76.21	2021 JGP Slovakia
9	Kirill Sarnovskiy	Russia	75.20	2021 JGP Austria
10	Andrei Anisimov	Russia	73.69	2021 JGP Russia

Top 10 best scores in the men's free skating
No.	Skater	Nation	Score	Event
1	Ilia Malinin	United States	164.04	2021 JGP Austria
2	Gleb Lutfullin	Russia	155.20	2021 JGP Poland
3	Ilya Yablokov	Russia	153.10	2021 JGP Slovenia
4	Egor Rukhin	Russia	144.86	2021 JGP Russia
5	Kirill Sarnovskiy	Russia	144.48	2021 JGP Slovakia
6	Mikhail Shaidorov	Kazakhstan	142.52	2021 JGP Poland
7	Wesley Chiu	Canada	140.96	2021 JGP Russia
8	Artem Kovalev	Russia	140.54	2021 JGP Austria
9	Fedor Zonov	Russia	137.56	2021 JGP Russia
10	Arlet Levandi	Estonia	135.20	2021 JGP France II

=== Women's singles ===
Top 10 best scores in the women's combined total
No.	Skater	Nation	Score	Event
1	Sofia Akateva	Russia	233.08	2021 JGP Russia
2	Veronika Zhilina	Russia	216.92	2021 JGP Slovakia
3	Sofia Muravieva	Russia	211.81	2021 JGP Austria
4	Adeliia Petrosian	Russia	210.57	2021 JGP Slovenia
5	Isabeau Levito	United States	208.31	2021 JGP Austria
6	Anastasia Zinina	Russia	206.20	2021 JGP Russia
7	Sofia Samodelkina	Russia	205.67	2021 JGP Slovenia
8	Elizaveta Kulikova	Russia	196.83	2021 JGP Russia
9	Elizaveta Berestovskaia	Russia	196.07	2021 JGP Russia
10	Lindsay Thorngren	United States	193.77	2021 JGP Slovenia

Top 10 best scores in the women's short program
No.	Skater	Nation	Score	Event
1	Sofia Akateva	Russia	75.89	2021 JGP Russia
2	Sofia Muravieva	Russia	73.28	2021 JGP Austria
3	Veronika Zhilina	Russia	71.57	2021 JGP Slovakia
4	Isabeau Levito	United States	71.32	2021 JGP Austria
5	Adeliia Petrosian	Russia	70.86	2021 JGP Slovenia
6	Kim Min-chae	South Korea	70.83	2021 JGP Slovenia
7	Lindsay Thorngren	United States	70.24	2021 JGP Slovenia
8	Anastasia Zinina	Russia	69.77	2021 JGP Austria
9	Mariia Zakharova	Russia	69.04	2021 JGP Slovakia
10	Shin Ji-a	South Korea	67.28	2021 JGP Poland

Top 10 best scores in the women's free skating
No.	Skater	Nation	Score	Event
1	Sofia Akateva	Russia	157.19	2021 JGP Russia
2	Veronika Zhilina	Russia	145.35	2021 JGP Slovakia
3	Sofia Samodelkina	Russia	141.63	2021 JGP Russia
4	Adeliia Petrosian	Russia	139.71	2021 JGP Slovenia
5	Anastasia Zinina	Russia	139.18	2021 JGP Russia
6	Sofia Muravieva	Russia	138.53	2021 JGP Austria
7	Isabeau Levito	United States	136.99	2021 JGP Austria
8	Elizaveta Berestovskaia	Russia	131.16	2021 JGP Russia
9	Elizaveta Kulikova	Russia	129.75	2021 JGP Russia
10	Kim Chae-yeon	South Korea	124.56	2021 JGP France II

=== Pairs ===
Top 10 best scores in the pairs' combined total
No.	Team	Nation	Score	Event
1	Ekaterina Chikmareva / Matvei Ianchenkov	Russia	189.11	2021 JGP Russia
2	Natalia Khabibullina / Ilya Knyazhuk	Russia	188.84	2021 JGP Austria
3	Anastasia Mukhortova / Dmitry Evgenyev	Russia	183.64	2021 JGP Austria
4	Karina Safina / Luka Berulava	Georgia	179.27	2021 JGP Austria
5	Ekaterina Petushkova / Evgenii Malikov	Russia	170.46	2021 JGP Russia
6	Ekaterina Storublevtseva / Artem Gritsaenko	Russia	168.13	2021 JGP Russia
7	Polina Kostiukovich / Aleksei Briukhanov	Russia	162.14	2021 JGP Poland
8	Anastasia Golubeva / Hektor Giotopoulos Moore	Australia	160.16	2021 JGP Austria
9	Anastasiia Smirnova / Danil Siianytsia	United States	156.40	2021 JGP Austria
10	Kseniia Akhanteva / Valerii Kolesov	Russia	151.35	2021 JGP Slovakia

Top 10 best scores in the pairs' short program
No.	Team	Nation	Score	Event
1	Natalia Khabibullina / Ilya Knyazhuk	Russia	64.23	2021 JGP Austria
2	Ekaterina Chikmareva / Matvei Ianchenkov	Russia	64.12	2021 JGP Russia
3	Anastasia Mukhortova / Dmitry Evgenyev	Russia	63.84	2021 JGP Austria
4	Polina Kostiukovich / Aleksei Briukhanov	Russia	63.76	2021 JGP Poland
5	Karina Safina / Luka Berulava	Georgia	63.04	2021 JGP Austria
6	Ekaterina Petushkova / Evgenii Malikov	Russia	62.54	2021 JGP Russia
7	Ekaterina Storublevtseva / Artem Gritsaenko	Russia	61.85	2021 JGP Russia
8	Kseniia Akhanteva / Valerii Kolesov	Russia	58.20	2021 JGP Slovakia
9	Anastasia Golubeva / Hektor Giotopoulos Moore	Australia	57.35	2021 JGP Russia
10	Anastasiia Smirnova / Danil Siianytsia	United States	55.07	2021 JGP Poland

Top 10 best scores in the pairs' free skating
No.	Team	Nation	Score	Event
1	Ekaterina Chikmareva / Matvei Ianchenkov	Russia	124.99	2021 JGP Russia
2	Natalia Khabibullina / Ilya Knyazhuk	Russia	124.61	2021 JGP Austria
3	Anastasia Mukhortova / Dmitry Evgenyev	Russia	119.80	2021 JGP Austria
4	Karina Safina / Luka Berulava	Georgia	116.23	2021 JGP Austria
5	Ekaterina Petushkova / Evgenii Malikov	Russia	108.50	2021 JGP Poland
6	Anastasia Golubeva / Hektor Giotopoulos Moore	Australia	107.12	2021 JGP Austria
7	Ekaterina Storublevtseva / Artem Gritsaenko	Russia	106.28	2021 JGP Russia
8	Anastasiia Smirnova / Danil Siianytsia	United States	104.85	2021 JGP Austria
9	Polina Kostiukovich / Aleksei Briukhanov	Russia	102.45	2021 JGP Slovakia
10	Violetta Sierova / Ivan Khobta	Ukraine	98.08	2021 JGP Slovakia

=== Ice dance ===
Top 10 season's best scores in the combined total (ice dance)
No.	Team	Nation	Score	Event
1	Irina Khavronina / Dario Cirisano	Russia	168.96	2021 JGP Poland
2	Vasilisa Kaganovskaia / Valeriy Angelopol	Russia	167.22	2021 JGP Slovenia
3	Sofia Leonteva / Daniil Gorelkin	Russia	165.14	2021 JGP Russia
4	Katarina Wolfkostin / Jeffrey Chen	United States	165.01	2021 JGP France I
5	Natalie D'Alessandro / Bruce Waddell	Canada	163.04	2021 JGP Slovakia
6	Sofya Tyutyunina / Alexander Shustitskiy	Russia	162.28	2021 JGP Austria
7	Angela Ling / Caleb Wein	United States	160.23	2021 JGP Russia
8	Nadiia Bashynska / Peter Beaumont	Canada	157.39	2021 JGP Russia
9	Olga Mamchenkova / Mark Volkov	Russia	156.35	2021 JGP Russia
10	Isabella Flores / Dimitry Tsarevski	United States	154.34	2021 JGP Poland

Top 10 season's best scores in the rhythm dance
No.	Team	Nation	Score	Event
1	Irina Khavronina / Dario Cirisano	Russia	68.05	2021 JGP Poland
2	Sofya Tyutyunina / Alexander Shustitskiy	Russia	67.00	2021 JGP Austria
3	Vasilisa Kaganovskaia / Valeriy Angelopol	Russia	66.00	2021 JGP Slovenia
4	Katarina Wolfkostin / Jeffrey Chen	United States	64.75	2021 JGP France I
5	Natalie D'Alessandro / Bruce Waddell	Canada	64.48	2021 JGP Slovakia
6	Sofia Leonteva / Daniil Gorelkin	Russia	63.70	2021 JGP Russia
6	Oona Brown / Gage Brown	United States	63.70	2021 JGP Austria
8	Angela Ling / Caleb Wein	United States	63.65	2021 JGP Russia
9	Isabella Flores / Dimitry Tsarevski	United States	63.29	2021 JGP Poland
10	Olga Mamchenkova / Mark Volkov	Russia	61.56	2021 JGP Poland

Top 10 season's best scores in the free dance
No.	Team	Nation	Score	Event
1	Sofia Leonteva / Daniil Gorelkin	Russia	101.44	2021 JGP Russia
2	Vasilisa Kaganovskaia / Valeriy Angelopol	Russia	101.22	2021 JGP Slovenia
3	Irina Khavronina / Dario Cirisano	Russia	100.91	2021 JGP Poland
4	Katarina Wolfkostin / Jeffrey Chen	United States	100.26	2021 JGP France I
4	Katarina Wolfkostin / Jeffrey Chen	United States	100.26	2021 JGP Slovenia
5	Natalie D'Alessandro / Bruce Waddell	Canada	98.56	2021 JGP Slovakia
6	Olga Mamchenkova / Mark Volkov	Russia	97.18	2021 JGP Russia
7	Nadiia Bashynska / Peter Beaumont	Canada	97.04	2021 JGP Russia
8	Angela Ling / Caleb Wein	United States	96.58	2021 JGP Russia
9	Sofya Tyutyunina / Alexander Shustitskiy	Russia	95.28	2021 JGP Austria
10	Oona Brown / Gage Brown	United States	94.46	2021 JGP France II
