= Anastasiia Smirnova (figure skater) =

Ukrainian-American pair skater

Personal information
- Native name: Анастасія Смірнова
- Born: April 20, 2004 (age 22) Dnipro, Ukraine
- Home town: Shakopee, Minnesota, U.S.
- Height: 4 ft 11 in (1.50 m)

Figure skating career
- Country: United States
- Partner: Danylo Siianytsia
- Coach: Trudy Oltmanns
- Skating club: Yarmouth Ice Club
- Began skating: 2010
- Retired: 28 August 2023

Anastasiia Smirnova (Note: Ukrainian: Анастасія Смірнова, romanized: Anastasiia Smirnova) (born April 20, 2004) is a former Ukrainian-born pair skater who represented the United States and Ukraine. With her skating partner, Danylo Siianytsia, she is the 2022 CS Golden Spin of Zagreb champion. They are also the 2021 U.S. junior national champions and finished in the top ten at two World Junior Championships.

== Personal life ==
Smirnova was born on April 20, 2004, in Dnipro, Ukraine in a Russian-speaking family. As of 2021, she is in her last year of an online Ukrainian high school. Smirnova came to the United States in mid-2018 on a P-1 visa and hopes to gain U.S. citizenship.

Smirnova has a pet kitten named Bunny. She previously coached Learn to Skate lessons at the Shakopee Ice Arena, where she trains.

== Career ==
=== Early career ===
Smirnova began skating in 2010 in Dnipro. Her first pairs partner was Artem Darenskyi. Coached by Lilia Batutina, Smirnova/Darenskyi were the 2015 Ukrainian junior national silver medalists and the 2016 Ukrainian junior national champion. They competed at two Junior Grand Prix events, placing ninth at 2017 JGP Latvia and 11th at 2017 JGP Belarus, before splitting in fall 2017.

Smirnova teamed up with Danylo Siianytsia in mid-2018 after he found her profile on IcePartnerSearch and asked his coach, Trudy Oltmanns, to arrange a tryout. She moved from Ukraine to train with Siianytsia under Oltmanns in Shakopee, Minnesota. In their first season together, they won the novice bronze medal at the 2019 U.S. Championships.

=== 2019–20 season ===
Smirnova/Siianytsia made their junior international debut at 2019 JGP Russia, where they finished seventh overall. They then competed at the 2019–20 U.S. Pairs Final and won the bronze medal, qualifying them to the 2020 U.S. Championships. At the 2019 Golden Spin of Zagreb in December, Smirnova/Siianytsia earned their first international medal, silver behind Georgia's Butaeva/Berulava.

At the 2020 U.S. Championships, Smirnova/Siianytsia were third in the short program but won the free skate to earn the silver medal behind Finster/Nagy. As a result, they were named to the 2020 World Junior Championships team. Smirnova/Siianytsia finished tenth at the World Junior Championships.

=== 2020–21 season ===
After the COVID-19 pandemic in Minnesota caused their training rink to close, Smirnova/Siianytsia temporarily relocated with their coach to her old rink in Sioux Center, Iowa. The Junior Grand Prix, where they would have competed, was also affected by the COVID-19 pandemic and canceled.

In January, Smirnova/Siianytsia won the junior title at the 2021 U.S. Championships by over 20 points ahead of silver medalists Martins/Bedard, despite Smirnova suffering a high ankle sprain on her right leg in practice the day before competition began. Siianytsia reflected that they were "pretty excited" about the win and "hopefully, it won't be our last one."

=== 2021–22 season ===
Smirnova/Siianytsia returned to international competition on the Junior Grand Prix. They were fourth overall in Poland despite placing third in each segment and finished sixth in Austria. They also competed on the senior level for the first time, placing ninth at the Skating Club of Boston's Cranberry Cup. Both skaters contracted COVID-19 in December and withdrew from the 2022 U.S. Junior Championships.

Despite their absence from the national championships, Smirnova/Siianytsia were named to the American team for the 2022 World Junior Championships, which had been originally scheduled to be held in Sofia, but due to the pandemic were moved to Tallinn in mid-April. Due to Vladimir Putin's invasion of Ukraine, the International Skating Union banned all Russian athletes from competing at the event. This had a significant impact on the pairs field, long dominated by Russia. The invasion of their native country was a difficult experience for both, with both having family members still living there, some of whom evacuated to Poland. Siianytsia called it "terrifying for our family." Smirnova/Siianytsia placed third in the short program, winning a bronze small medal, their only error being Smirnova underrotating and stepping out of her double Axel. However, the free program proved to be difficult, with Siianytsia falling on both jumps, Smirnova falling on their second throw jump, and then their second lift aborted. They dropped to fourth place overall.

=== 2022–23 season ===
Moving to the international senior level full-time, Smirnova/Siianytsia made their Challenger debut at the 2022 CS Finlandia Trophy, where they finished in seventh place. Given two Grand Prix assignments, they were scheduled to make their debut at the 2022 Skate America but had to withdraw after Siianytsia suffered a groin injury. Despite this, they were able to attend their second event, the 2022 Grand Prix of Espoo, five weeks later. They finished second in the short program. However, they dropped to fourth place after the free skate.

Prior to the 2023 U.S. Championships, Smirmova sustained an injury that forced the pair to withdraw from the competition.

== Programs ==
=== With Siianytsia ===
Season	Short program	Free skating	Exhibition
2023–2024	Earned It (from Fifty Shades of Grey) by The Weeknd	Beneath Your Beautiful by Labrinth, Emeli Sandé	
2022–2023	The Sound of Silence by Simon & Garfunkel performed by Disturbed choreo. by Adam Blake	Je suis malade performed by Lara Fabian choreo. by Trudy Oltmanns	Candyman by Christina Aguilera
2021–2022	Big Spender (from Sweet Charity) performed by Janice Hagan choreo. by Trudy Oltmanns	Je suis malade performed by Lara Fabian choreo. by Trudy Oltmanns	
2020–2021		The Prayer by Andrea Bocelli, Celine Dion choreo. by Trudy Oltmanns	
2019–2020	Kiss of Fire by Ángel Villoldo performed by Hugh Laurie choreo. by Rohene Ward	Gravity by Sara Bareilles choreo. by Trudy Oltmanns, Michael Lueck	

=== With Darenskyi ===
Season	Short program	Free skating
2017–2018	Don Quixote by Léon Minkus choreo. by Julia Gorbacheva	The Nutcracker by Pyotr Ilyich Tchaikovsky choreo. by Yulia Horbacheva

== Competitive highlights ==
GP: Grand Prix; CS: Challenger Series; JGP: Junior Grand Prix

=== With Siianytsia for the United States ===
International
Event	19–20	20–21	21–22	22–23
GP Finland				4th
CS Finlandia				7th
CS Golden Spin				1st
Cranberry Cup			9th	
International: Junior
Junior Worlds	10th		4th	
JGP Austria			6th	
JGP Poland			4th	
JGP Russia	7th			
Golden Spin	2nd			
National
U.S. Champ.	2nd J	1st J	WD	WD

=== With Darenskyi for Ukraine ===
International: Junior
Event	2015–16	2016–17	2017–18
JGP Belarus			9th
JGP Latvia			11th
National
Ukrainian Junior	2nd	1st	

== Detailed results ==
ISU Personal Best highlighted in bold.

With Siianytsia

=== Senior results ===
**2022–23 season**
Date	Event	SP	FS	Total
December 7–10, 2022	2022 CS Golden Spin of Zagreb	2; 62.44	1; 116.82	1; 179.26
November 25–27, 2022	2022 Grand Prix of Espoo	2; 63.01	4; 102.11	4; 165.12
October 4–9, 2022	2022 CS Finlandia Trophy	7; 54.50	7; 98.38	7; 152.88

=== Junior results ===
**2021–22 season**
Date	Event	SP	FS	Total
April 13–17, 2022	2022 World Junior Championships	3; **60.38**	5; 88.15	4; 148.53
October 6–9, 2021	2021 JGP Austria	7; 51.55	6; **104.85**	6; **156.40**
Sept. 29 – Oct. 2, 2021	2021 JGP Poland	3; 55.07	3; 98.56	4; 153.63
**2020–21 season**
Date	Event	SP	FS	Total
January 11–21, 2021	2021 U.S. Championships	1; 59.07	1; 110.78	1; 169.85
**2019–20 season**
Date	Event	SP	FS	Total
March 2–8, 2020	2020 World Junior Championships	11; 51.19	10; 93.86	10; 145.05
January 20–26, 2020	2020 U.S. Championships	3; 54.56	1; 108.48	2; 163.04
December 4–7, 2019	2019 Golden Spin of Zagreb	1; 52.17	3; 80.53	2; 132.70
September 11–14, 2019	2019 JGP Russia	7; 45.69	7; 81.20	7; 126.89
