= 2022 World Junior Figure Skating Championships =

- Type: ISU Championship
- Date: April 13 – 17
- Season: 2021–22
- Location: Tallinn, Estonia
- Host: Estonian Skating Union
- Venue: Tondiraba Ice Hall

Champions
- Men's singles: (United States) Ilia Malinin
- Women's singles: (United States) Isabeau Levito
- Pairs: (Georgia (country)) Karina Safina / Luka Berulava
- Ice dance: (United States) Oona Brown / Gage Brown
- Previous: 2020 World Junior Championships
- Next: 2023 World Junior Championships

The 2022 World Junior Figure Skating Championships was held from April 13–17, 2022 in Tallinn, Estonia. Figure skaters competed for the title of junior world champion in men's singles, women's singles, pairs, and ice dance. The competition determined the entry quotas for each federation during the 2022–23 ISU Junior Grand Prix series and at the 2023 World Junior Championships.

The competition was originally scheduled to be held in Sofia, Bulgaria from March 7–13, 2022. On February 27, the ISU announced that in light of the COVID-19 pandemic in Bulgaria and the Russian invasion of Ukraine, the event would be unable to be held as scheduled in Bulgaria. Tallinn was announced as the host for the newly scheduled dates on March 4. The city previously had previously hosted the event twice, in 2015 and 2020.

== Background ==
On February 12, the International Skating Union announced that the event could not be held as planned due to concerns about a surge in omicron variant cases in Bulgaria peaking on the originally scheduled dates, as well as the host nation's restrictive entry requirements. As the 2021 World Junior Championships were already cancelled, the ISU announced that they would evaluate the feasibility of postponing the event until May 2022, if the Bulgarian Skating Federation and other ISU member nations were willing to attend. A final decision was expected to be made at the ISU Council meeting on February 24, but was delayed to allow time to assess the impact of the Russian invasion of Ukraine.

On February 27, the ISU announced that while they were still considering the feasibility of postponing the event to later in the spring, Bulgaria would no longer be available to host and invited other ISU member nations to apply as replacement hosts. The Estonian Skating Union, which had hosted both the European and Four Continents Championships earlier in the season, was the sole applicant.

== Qualifications ==
=== Age and minimum TES requirements ===
Skaters who reached the age of 13 before July 1, 2021, but had not turned 19 (singles and females of the other two disciplines) or 21 (male pair skaters and ice dancers) were eligible to compete at the junior level.

The ISU stipulated that the minimum scores must have been achieved at an ISU-recognized junior international competition in the ongoing or preceding two seasons (adjusted from the traditional one due to the pandemic), no later than 21 days before the first official practice day.

Minimum technical scores (TES)
Discipline	SP / RD	FS / FD
Men	23	42
Women	23	38
Pairs	23	34
Ice dance	23	37

- SP/RD and FS/FD scores may be attained at different events.

=== Number of entries per discipline ===
Normally, the number of entries would be based on the results of the preceding Junior Worlds. However, as the 2021 World Junior Championships were cancelled, the results of the 2020 World Junior Championships were used instead.

On March 1, the ISU banned participation by Russian and Belarusian skaters in all international competitions due to the 2022 Russian invasion of Ukraine.

Number of entries per discipline
Spots	Men	Women	Pairs	Ice dance
3	Japan; ~~Russia~~; United States	~~Russia~~; South Korea; United States	~~Russia~~	Georgia; ~~Russia~~; United States
2	Canada; Estonia; France; Italy	Azerbaijan; Canada; Japan; Poland	Canada; China; France; Georgia; Germany; United States	Canada; France

- If not listed above, only one entry is allowed.

== Schedule ==
No exhibition gala was scheduled.

Schedule
Date	Discipline	Time	Segment
Thursday, April 14	Men	13:00	Short program
Thursday, April 14	All	18:30	Opening ceremony
Thursday, April 14	Pairs	19:05	Short program
Friday, April 15	Ice dance	14:15	Rhythm dance
Friday, April 15	Pairs	18:55	Free skating
Saturday, April 16	Women	10:15	Short program
Saturday, April 16	Men	18:15	Free skating
Sunday, April 17	Ice dance	11:45	Free dance
Sunday, April 17	Women	15:45	Free skating

- All times are listed in local time (UTC+03:00).

== Entries ==
Member nations began announcing their selections in December 2021. The International Skating Union published a complete list of entries on March 25, 2022.

Entries - 2022 World Junior Figure Skating Championships
Country	Men	Women	Pairs	Ice dance
Armenia	Semen Daniliants	—		—
Australia	—	Victoria Alcantara	Anastasia Golubeva / Hektor Giotopoulos Moore	—
Austria	—	Dorotea Leitgeb	—	Anita Straub / Andreas Straub
Belgium	—	Nina Pinzarrone	—	—
Bulgaria	Filip Kaymakchiev	Chiara Hristova	—	—
Canada	Wesley Chiu	Justine Miclette	Brooke McIntosh / Benjamin Mimar	Nadiia Bashynska / Peter Beaumont
Canada	Stephen Gogolev	Lia Pereira	Chloe Panetta / Kieran Trasher	Natalie D'Alessandro / Bruce Waddell
Croatia	—	Hana Cvijanović	—	—
Cyprus	—	Stefania Yakovleva	—	Angelina Kudryavtseva / Ilia Karankevich
Czech Republic	Georgii Reshtenko	Barbora Vránková	Barbora Kuciánová / Lukáš Vochozka	Denisa Cimlová / Vilém Hlavsa
Denmark	—	Catharina Victoria Petersen	—	—
Estonia	Arlet Levandi	Niina Petrõkina	—	Tatjana Bunina / Ivan Kuznetsov
Estonia	Mihhail Selevko	—	—	—
Finland	Makar Suntsev	Linnea Ceder	—	—
France	François Pitot	Lorine Schild	Oxana Vouillamoz / Flavien Giniaux	Eva Bernard / Tom Jochum
France	Corentin Spinar	—	—	Célina Fradji / Jean-Hans Fourneaux
Georgia	Konstantin Supatashvili	—	Karina Safina / Luka Berulava	Yulia Lebedeva-Bitadze / Dmitri Parkhomenko
Germany	Louis Weissert	Olesya Ray	Letizia Roscher / Luis Schuster	Darya Grimm / Michail Savitskiy
Great Britain	Edward Appleby	Elena Komova	—	Phebe Bekker / James Hernandez
Hong Kong	—	Cheuk Ka Kahlen Cheung	—	—
Hungary	Aleksandr Vlasenko	Vivien Papp	—	Réka Leveles / Balázs Leveles
Israel	Lev Vinokur	Mariia Seniuk	—	Elizabeth Tkachenko / Alexei Kiliakov
Italy	Nikolaj Memola	Anna Pezzetta	Alyssa Montan / Filippo Clerici	Giorgia Galimberti / Matteo Libasse Mandelli
Italy	Raffaele Francesco Zich	—	—	—
Japan	Lucas Tsuyoshi Honda	Rion Sumiyoshi	—	Nao Kida / Masaya Morita
Japan	Kao Miura	Rinka Watanabe	—	—
Japan	Tatsuya Tsuboi	—	—	—
Kazakhstan	Mikhail Shaidorov	Anna Levkovets	—	—
Latvia	—	Nikola Fomčenkova	—	—
Lithuania	—	Jogailė Aglinskytė	—	—
Mexico	—	Andrea Astrain Maynez	—	—
Netherlands	—	Julia van Dijk	—	—
Norway	—	Mia Caroline Risa Gomez	—	—
Philippines	—	Sofia Lexi Jacqueline Frank	—	—
Poland	Jakub Lofek	Wiktoria Małyniak	—	Olivia Oliver / Joshua Andari
Poland	—	Noelle Streuli	—	—
Romania	—	Ana Sofia Beşchea	—	—
Slovakia	Adam Hagara	Vanesa Šelmeková	—	Anna Šimová / Kirill Aksenov
Slovenia	David Sedej	Julija Lovrenčič	—	—
South Korea	Cha Young-hyun	Shin Ji-a	—	Hannah Lim / Ye Quan
South Korea	—	Wi Seo-yeong	—	—
South Korea	—	Yun Ah-sun	—	—
Spain	Euken Alberdi	—	—	—
Sweden	Andreas Nordebäck	Emelie Ling	—	—
Switzerland	Naoki Rossi	Kimmy Repond	—	Kayleigh Maksymec / Maximilien Rahier
Turkey	Ali Efe Güneş	Anna Deniz Özdemir	—	Jillian Autumn Prever / Ağahan Berk Dörtkol
Ukraine	Kyrylo Marsak	Anastasiia Fomchenkova	Violetta Sierova / Ivan Khobta	Mariia Pinchuk / Mykyta Pogorielov
United States	Liam Kapeikis	Isabeau Levito	Anastasiia Smirnova / Danylo Siianytsia	Oona Brown / Gage Brown
United States	Kai Kovar	Clare Seo	—	Angela Ling / Caleb Wein
United States	Ilia Malinin	Lindsay Thorngren	—	Katarina Wolfkostin / Jeffrey Chen

=== Changes to preliminary entries ===
Changes to preliminary assignments
Date	Discipline	Withdrew	Added	Reason	Refs
February 6	Pairs	(Canada) Summer Homick / Marty Haubrich	(Canada) Chloe Panetta / Kieran Thrasher	Failed to meet TES minimums	
February 14	Ice dance	(Switzerland) Gina Zehnder / Beda Leon Sieber	(Switzerland) Kayleigh Maksymec / Maximilien Rahier	Injury (Zehnder)	
March 10	Women	(South Korea) Lee Hae-in	(South Korea) Yun Ah-sun	Event conflict with the Triglav Trophy	
March 11	Pairs	(United States) Isabelle Martins / Ryan Bedard	—	Split	
March 25	Men	(Chinese Taipei) Li Yu-Hsiang	—		
March 25	Men	(Japan) Shun Sato	(Japan) Lucas Tsuyoshi Honda	Injury	
March 30	Men	(United States) Lucas Broussard	(United States) Kai Kovar		
March 30	Women	(Azerbaijan) Sabina Alieva	—		
March 31	Ice dance	(Italy) Noemi Maria Tali / Stefano Frasca	(Italy) Giorgia Galimberti / Matteo Libasse Mandelli		
April 11	Men	(Latvia) Daniels Kočkers	—		
April 12	Men	(Turkey) Alp Eren Özkan	(Turkey) Ali Efe Güneş		
April 12	Women	(Iceland) Aldís Kara Bergsdóttir	—		
April 12	Women	(Greece) Stella Makri	—		

== Medal summary ==
Medals awarded to the skaters who achieve the highest overall placements in each discipline:

Discipline	Gold	Silver	Bronze
Men	(United States) Ilia Malinin	(Kazakhstan) Mikhail Shaidorov	(Japan) Tatsuya Tsuboi
Women	(United States) Isabeau Levito	(South Korea) Shin Ji-a	(United States) Lindsay Thorngren
Pairs	(Georgia (country)) Karina Safina / Luka Berulava	(Australia) Anastasia Golubeva / Hektor Giotopoulos Moore	(Canada) Brooke McIntosh / Benjamin Mimar
Ice dance	(United States) Oona Brown / Gage Brown	(Canada) Natalie D'Alessandro / Bruce Waddell	(Canada) Nadiia Bashynska / Peter Beaumont

Small medals awarded to the skaters who achieve the highest short program or rhythm dance placements in each discipline:

Discipline	Gold	Silver	Bronze
Men	(United States) Ilia Malinin	(Canada) Wesley Chiu	(Estonia) Mihhail Selevko
Women	(United States) Isabeau Levito	(South Korea) Shin Ji-a	(South Korea) Yun Ah-sun
Pairs	(Georgia (country)) Karina Safina / Luka Berulava	(Australia) Anastasia Golubeva / Hektor Giotopoulos Moore	(United States) Anastasiia Smirnova / Danil Siianytsia
Ice dance	(United States) Oona Brown / Gage Brown	(Canada) Natalie D'Alessandro / Bruce Waddell	(Canada) Nadiia Bashynska / Peter Beaumont

Medals awarded to the skaters who achieve the highest free skating or free dance placements in each discipline:

Discipline	Gold	Silver	Bronze
Men	(United States) Ilia Malinin	(Kazakhstan) Mikhail Shaidorov	(Japan) Tatsuya Tsuboi
Women	(South Korea) Shin Ji-a	(United States) Isabeau Levito	(United States) Lindsay Thorngren
Pairs	(Georgia (country)) Karina Safina / Luka Berulava	(Australia) Anastasia Golubeva / Hektor Giotopoulos Moore	(Canada) Brooke McIntosh / Benjamin Mimar
Ice dance	(United States) Oona Brown / Gage Brown	(United States) Katarina Wolfkostin / Jeffrey Chen	(Canada) Natalie D'Alessandro / Bruce Waddell

=== Medals by country ===
Table of medals for overall placement:

Rank	Nation	Gold	Silver	Bronze	Total
1	United States	3	0	1	4
2	Georgia	1	0	0	1
3	Canada	0	1	2	3
4	Australia	0	1	0	1
4	Kazakhstan	0	1	0	1
4	South Korea	0	1	0	1
7	Japan	0	0	1	1
Totals (7 entries)		4	4	4	12

== Records and achievements ==
The following new junior ISU best scores were set during this season:

Disc.	Segment	Skater(s)	Score	Date	Ref.
Men	Short program	(United States) Ilia Malinin	88.99	April 14, 2022	
Men	Free skating	(United States) Ilia Malinin	187.12	April 16, 2022	
Men	Total score	(United States) Ilia Malinin	276.11	April 16, 2022	

== Results ==
=== Men's singles ===
Men's results
Rank	Name	Nation	Total points	SP		FS	
1	Ilia Malinin	United States	276.11	1	88.99	1	187.12
2	Mikhail Shaidorov	Kazakhstan	234.31	8	75.14	2	159.17
3	Tatsuya Tsuboi	Japan	233.82	5	79.15	3	154.67
4	Wesley Chiu	Canada	228.29	2	81.59	4	146.70
5	Stephen Gogolev	Canada	224.49	6	78.75	5	145.74
6	Mihhail Selevko	Estonia	218.68	3	81.26	9	137.42
7	Nikolaj Memola	Italy	212.94	10	71.42	6	141.52
8	Liam Kapeikis	United States	210.94	4	79.83	12	131.11
9	Naoki Rossi	Switzerland	206.65	12	67.61	7	139.04
10	Andreas Nordebäck	Sweden	206.13	7	76.20	14	129.93
11	Georgii Reshtenko	Czech Republic	201.76	11	69.67	11	132.09
12	Arlet Levandi	Estonia	200.10	14	65.31	10	134.79
13	Kao Miura	Japan	197.59	20	60.03	8	137.56
14	Lucas Tsuyoshi Honda	Japan	196.83	9	73.01	16	123.82
15	Raffaele Francesco Zich	Italy	195.34	15	65.19	13	130.15
16	Lev Vinokur	Israel	192.11	13	67.20	15	124.91
17	Corentin Spinar	France	176.24	17	64.10	19	112.14
18	Kai Kovar	United States	176.23	22	57.69	17	118.54
19	Cha Young-hyun	South Korea	175.63	19	60.32	18	115.31
20	Edward Appleby	Great Britain	173.96	18	64.05	21	109.91
21	Adam Hagara	Slovakia	172.76	16	64.72	22	108.04
22	Konstantin Supatashvili	Georgia	169.66	21	59.38	20	110.28
23	Louis Weissert	Germany	154.75	23	56.75	23	98.00
24	Jakub Lofek	Poland	151.48	24	56.54	24	94.94
Did not advance to free skating
25	Semen Daniliants	Armenia	56.34	25	56.34	—	
26	Makar Suntsev	Finland	56.26	26	56.26	—	
27	Aleksandr Vlasenko	Hungary	53.54	27	53.54	—	
28	Ali Efe Güneş	Turkey	52.24	28	52.24	—	
29	Euken Alberdi	Spain	51.21	29	51.21	—	
30	François Pitot	France	48.98	30	48.98	—	
31	Filip Kaymakchiev	Bulgaria	47.08	31	47.08	—	
32	David Sedej	Slovenia	45.48	32	45.48	—	
33	Kyrylo Marsak	Ukraine	44.71	33	44.71	—	

=== Women's singles ===
Women's results
Rank	Name	Nation	Total points	SP		FS	
1	Isabeau Levito	United States	206.55	1	72.50	2	134.05
2	Shin Ji-a	South Korea	206.01	2	69.38	1	136.63
3	Lindsay Thorngren	United States	199.42	4	66.14	3	133.28
4	Yun Ah-sun	South Korea	195.87	3	66.28	4	129.59
5	Wi Seo-yeong	South Korea	186.72	5	66.09	6	120.63
6	Clare Seo	United States	182.81	10	60.61	5	122.20
7	Kimmy Repond	Switzerland	177.10	8	60.82	7	116.28
8	Rion Sumiyoshi	Japan	174.58	9	60.62	8	113.96
9	Niina Petrõkina	Estonia	173.49	6	65.90	10	107.59
10	Rinka Watanabe	Japan	165.44	11	59.56	11	105.48
11	Nina Pinzarrone	Belgium	161.92	7	63.67	16	98.25
12	Linnea Ceder	Finland	161.26	13	56.34	12	104.92
13	Anna Pezzetta	Italy	160.88	24	51.75	9	109.13
14	Lia Pereira	Canada	158.86	12	58.69	13	100.17
15	Noelle Streuli	Poland	154.78	15	55.10	15	99.68
16	Lorine Schild	France	154.57	17	54.58	14	99.99
17	Barbora Vránková	Czech Republic	145.75	20	52.89	17	92.86
18	Emelie Ling	Sweden	145.49	18	54.56	19	90.93
19	Mariia Seniuk	Israel	144.50	21	52.20	18	85.15
20	Julia van Dijk	Netherlands	139.76	16	54.61	20	85.15
21	Justine Miclette	Canada	137.34	14	55.41	22	81.93
22	Sofia Lexi Jacqueline Frank	Philippines	137.00	19	53.86	21	83.14
23	Olesya Ray	Germany	132.32	22	52.02	23	80.30
24	Jogailė Aglinskytė	Lithuania	129.65	23	51.76	24	77.89
Did not advance to free skating
25	Vivien Papp	Hungary	50.82	25	50.82	—	
26	Nikola Fomčenkova	Latvia	48.70	26	48.70	—	
27	Chiara Hristova	Bulgaria	48.14	27	48.14	—	
28	Catharina Victoria Petersen	Denmark	48.12	28	48.12	—	
29	Anna Levkovets	Kazakhstan	48.07	29	48.07	—	
30	Victoria Alcantara	Australia	47.54	30	47.54	—	
31	Julija Lovrenčič	Slovenia	47.16	31	47.16	—	
32	Cheuk Ka Kahlen Cheung	Hong Kong	45.76	32	45.76	—	
33	Wiktoria Małyniak	Poland	44.51	33	44.51	—	
34	Anna Deniz Özdemir	Turkey	41.93	34	41.93	—	
35	Vanesa Šelmeková	Slovakia	41.10	35	41.10	—	
36	Elena Komova	Great Britain	40.92	36	40.92	—	
37	Mia Caroline Risa Gomez	Norway	40.33	37	40.33	—	
38	Anastasiia Fomchenkova	Ukraine	38.74	38	38.74	—	
39	Stefania Yakovleva	Cyprus	38.64	39	38.64	—	
40	Dorotea Leitgeb	Austria	35.98	40	35.98	—	
41	Hana Cvijanović	Croatia	35.96	41	35.96	—	
42	Ana Sofia Beşchea	Romania	35.53	42	35.53	—	
43	Andrea Astrain Maynez	Mexico	35.09	43	35.09	—	

=== Pairs ===
Pairs' results
Rank	Name	Nation	Total points	SP		FS	
1	Karina Safina / Luka Berulava	Georgia	188.12	1	67.77	1	120.35
2	Anastasia Golubeva / Hektor Giotopoulos Moore	Australia	169.91	2	61.72	2	108.19
3	Brooke McIntosh / Benjamin Mimar	Canada	156.80	4	58.00	3	98.80
4	Anastasiia Smirnova / Danylo Siianytsia	United States	148.53	3	60.38	5	88.15
5	Letizia Roscher / Luis Schuster	Germany	146.43	5	54.01	4	92.42
6	Violetta Sierova / Ivan Khobta	Ukraine	134.46	6	49.57	6	84.89
7	Chloe Panetta / Kieran Thrasher	Canada	129.70	7	47.90	7	81.80
8	Alyssa Montan / Filippo Clerici	Italy	123.35	8	47.44	8	75.91
9	Barbora Kuciánová / Lukáš Vochozka	Czech Republic	116.91	9	42.50	9	74.41
10	Oxana Vouillamoz / Flavien Giniaux	France	103.92	10	38.04	10	65.88

=== Ice dance ===
Ice dance results
Rank	Name	Nation	Total points	RD		FD	
1	Oona Brown / Gage Brown	United States	170.25	1	66.98	1	103.27
2	Natalie D'Alessandro / Bruce Waddell	Canada	162.56	2	64.00	3	98.56
3	Nadiia Bashynska / Peter Beaumont	Canada	157.64	3	63.45	5	94.19
4	Katarina Wolfkostin / Jeffrey Chen	United States	157.27	9	57.05	2	100.22
5	Darya Grimm / Michail Savitskiy	Germany	154.48	4	62.47	7	92.01
6	Hannah Lim / Ye Quan	South Korea	154.44	7	58.82	4	95.62
7	Angela Ling / Caleb Wein	United States	153.98	6	61.43	6	92.55
8	Angelina Kudryavtseva / Ilia Karankevich	Cyprus	152.56	5	62.15	8	90.41
9	Célina Fradji / Jean-Hans Fourneaux	France	140.36	8	57.36	10	83.00
10	Phebe Bekker / James Hernandez	Great Britain	138.16	10	56.63	11	81.53
11	Eva Bernard / Tom Jochum	France	137.48	11	53.43	9	84.05
12	Nao Kida / Masaya Morita	Japan	132.94	14	52.02	12	80.92
13	Elizabeth Tkachenko / Alexei Kiliakov	Israel	132.20	13	52.36	13	79.84
14	Olivia Oliver / Joshua Andari	Poland	129.18	16	50.70	14	78.48
15	Tatjana Bunina / Ivan Kuznetsov	Estonia	127.32	18	50.26	15	77.06
16	Giorgia Galimberti / Matteo Libasse Mandelli	Italy	127.21	15	51.50	16	75.71
17	Mariia Pinchuk / Mykyta Pogorielov	Ukraine	126.83	12	52.39	17	74.44
18	Anna Šimová / Kirill Aksenov	Slovakia	122.64	17	50.36	19	72.28
19	Kayleigh Maksymec / Maximilien Rahier	Switzerland	120.25	19	49.24	20	71.01
20	Yulia Lebedeva-Bitadze / Dmitri Parkhomenko	Georgia	117.89	20	45.09	18	72.80
Did not advance to free dance
21	Denisa Cimlová / Vilém Hlavsa	Czech Republic	43.01	21	43.01	—	
22	Jillian Autumn Prever / Ağahan Berk Dörtkol	Turkey	41.02	22	41.02	—	
23	Anita Straub / Andreas Straub	Austria	33.73	23	33.73	—	
24	Réka Leveles / Balázs Leveles	Hungary	31.73	24	31.73	—	
