= Karina Safina =

Russian pair skater (born 2004)

Personal information
- Native name: Карина Илгизаровна Сафина (Russian)
- Full name: Karina Ilgizarovna Safina
- Born: 28 May 2004 (age 22) Chelyabinsk, Russia
- Home town: Berlin, Germany
- Height: 1.58 m (5 ft 2 in)

Figure skating career
- Country: Georgia
- Began skating: 2008
Medal record
Figure skating: Pairs
Representing Georgia
World Junior Championships
Gold medal – first place	2022 Tallinn	Pairs

Karina Ilgizarovna Safina (Russian: Карина Илгизаровна Сафина, Georgian: კარინა ილგიზაროვნა საფინა, born 28 May 2004) is a Russian-Georgian pair skater who competes for Georgia. With her former partner, Luka Berulava, she is the 2022 World Junior champion, the 2021 CS Nebelhorn Trophy bronze medalist, and finished fourth at both the 2022 World Championships and the 2022 European Championships.

Safina and Berulava were the first Georgian pair medalists on the ISU Junior Grand Prix circuit, having won silver at 2021 JGP Slovakia and bronze at 2021 JGP Austria, and the first Georgians to win a Junior World title in any discipline.

== Personal life ==
Safina was born on 28 May 2004 in Chelyabinsk, Russia, to parents Ilgizar and Yulia. She is of Bashkir descent and holds Russian and Georgian citizenship.

== Career ==
=== Early years ===
Safina began learning how to skate in 2008 as a four-year-old. She trained as a single skater in her native Chelyabinsk through the end of the 2016–17 season before moving to Moscow to team up with her first pair skating partner, Mikhail Domnin. Safina/Domnin competed together for two seasons, receiving only one international junior assignment in that time, the 2019 Bavarian Open, where they finished third. The team dissolved their partnership at the end of the 2019–20 season.

In advance of the 2020–21 season, Safina relocated to Perm to team up with Sergei Bakhmat under his coach, Pavel Sliusarenko. Safina/Bakhmat competed together for just one season before splitting and finishing sixth at the 2021 Russian Junior Championships.

=== 2021–22 season: Debut of Safina/Berulava ===
Safina teamed up with a fellow student of Sliusarenko, Luka Berulava, to compete for Georgia in advance of the 2021–22 season. The team made their international junior debut at the 2021 JGP Slovakia in early September, where they took the silver medal behind gold medal-winning Russian team Mukhortova/Evgenyev, and ahead of third place Russian team Kostiukovich/Briukhanov. Their placement marked Georgia's first Junior Grand Prix medal in pair skating.

Safina/Berulava next made their senior international debut at the 2021 CS Nebelhorn Trophy to attempt to qualify a berth for Georgia in the pairs event at the 2022 Winter Olympics. The team set a new personal best to win the short program by a narrow margin over German team Hase/Seegert. They fell to third in the free program after losing their forward inside death spiral and one of their lifts, and ultimately finished third overall to successfully qualify for an Olympic spot in their discipline for Georgia. Berulava remarked afterwards, "we would like to have done it in a better, nicer way." Their performance, along with Georgian ice dance team Kazakova/Reviya's podium placement, also qualified a spot for Georgia in the Olympic team event.

Safina/Berulava returned to the Junior Grand Prix circuit in October for their second assignment, the 2021 JGP Austria in Linz. They placed third in both segments to finish third overall behind Russian teams Khabibullina/Knyazhuk and Mukhortova/Evgenyev. Due to the unique qualification process for the 2021–22 season, the team did not advance to the 2021–22 Junior Grand Prix Final, despite two podium finishes.

In December, Safina/Berulava faced domestic rivals Metelkina/Parkman for the first time in international competition at the 2021 CS Golden Spin of Zagreb. Safina/Berulava set a new personal best to win the short program but fell to eighth in the free program standings after errors on their side-by-side jumping passes and losing their forward inside death spiral. The team placed seventh overall, while Metelkina/Parkman advanced onto the podium and took home the silver medal. Metelkina/Parkman initially received the nod for the Georgian pairs berth at the 2022 European Championships; however, Safina/Berulava replaced them after they withdrew from the event on 9 January. At Europeans, Safina/Berulava placed sixth in the short program after falling on their side-by-side triple Salchows. They delivered a stronger performance in the free skate, albeit still struggling with their side-by-side jumps, to climb to fourth in the segment and fourth overall, the best of the non-Russian competitors.

The day after the pairs free skate at the European Championships, Safina/Berulava were officially named to the Georgian team for the 2022 Winter Olympics by the Georgian Figure Skating Federation. Safina/Berulava made their Olympic debut in the team event before the opening ceremony on February 3. They cleanly skated their short program to place sixth in the segment out of nine and earn five points towards Team Georgia's combined score. However, despite scoring 22 team points overall to tie for fifth place with Team China going into the free skate, Team Georgia lost the tie-breaker and did not advance. In the pairs event, Safina/Berulava were ninth in the short program and eighth in the free skate, for ninth overall.

Days after the Olympics concluded, Vladimir Putin ordered an invasion of Ukraine, as a result of which the International Skating Union banned all Russian and Belarusian skaters from competing at the 2022 World Championships. As well, the Chinese Skating Association opted not to send athletes to compete in Montpellier. As those countries' athletes comprised the entirety of the top five pairs at the Olympics, this greatly impacted the field. Safina and Berulava, and the rest of the Georgian team relocated to train in Italy. They placed fourth in the short program at the World Championships with a clean skate. They were fourth in the free skate to finish fourth overall, the only error in the latter segment being Safina doubling out on a triple Salchow attempt.

Due to the pandemic, the World Junior Championships could not be held in their scheduled location of Sofia, and as a result, they were moved to Tallinn and held in mid-April, rather than their traditional early March timeframe. As Russian pair teams were also banned from attending this event, Safina/Berulava entered as heavy favourites for the gold medal. They won the short program with a clean skate and a 67.77 score. They also won the free skate, taking the title by a margin of almost twenty points. Berulava reflected that "it was a long and busy season with many competitions and to end it with a gold medal is really nice."

=== 2022–23 season ===
Safina and Berulava were assigned to make their senior Grand Prix debut in the fall. Despite dealing with an injury in the lead-up to their first event, the 2022 Grand Prix de France, they placed third in the short program, with Safina saying, "I am more pleased than not pleased with our performance today because nothing really worked in practice for me. We have still a lot of work ahead of us, and I think I've done the maximum of what I can do at the moment." They struggled in the free skate, placing sixth in that segment and dropping to fifth overall. The team later withdrew from their second assignment, the 2022 Grand Prix of Espoo.

After missing most of the season, Safina/Berulava returned to compete at the 2023 World Championships, but struggled at the event and came nineteenth. The following month, Safina announced that Berulava had chosen to end their partnership. She said that she would seek a new partner and a different coaching arrangement.

== Programs ==
=== With Berulava ===
Season	Short program	Free skating	Exhibition
2022–2023	Danse macabre by Camille Saint-Saëns choreo. by Eteri Tutberidze, Daniil Gleikhengauz	Exogenesis: Symphony by Muse choreo. by Eteri Tutberidze, Daniil Gleikhengauz	SOS d'un terrien en détresse by Daniel Balavoine performed by Dimash Qudaibergen
2021–2022	Moonlight by Viper choreo. by Nikolai Morozov, Ivan Malafeev	In This Shirt by The Irrepressibles choreo. by Nikolai Morozov, Ivan Malafeev	Mahindj Var by Nodar Reviya

== Competitive highlights ==
CS: Challenger Series; JGP: Junior Grand Prix

=== Pair skating with Luka Berulava (for Georgia) ===
Competition placements at senior level
Season	2021–22	2022–23
Winter Olympics	9th	
Winter Olympics (Team event)	6th	
World Championships	4th	19th
European Championships	4th	
GP France		5th
CS Golden Spin of Zagreb	7th	
CS Nebelhorn Trophy	3rd	

Competition placements at junior level
Season	2021–22
World Junior Championships	1st
JGP Austria	3rd
JGP Slovakia	2nd

=== With Bakhmat for Russia ===
National
Event	2020–21
Russian Junior	6th

=== With Domnin for Russia ===
International: Junior
Event	2018–19
Bavarian Open	3rd J
J = Junior

== Detailed results ==
Small medals for short and free programs awarded only at ISU Championships.

=== With Berulava for Georgia ===
==== Senior results ====
2022–2023 season
Date	Event	SP	FS	Total
March 22–26, 2023	2023 World Championships	14; 60.98	20; 86.01	19; 146.99
November 4–6, 2022	2022 Grand Prix de France	3; 61.55	6; 100.89	5; 162.44
2021–2022 season
Date	Event	SP	FS	Total
March 21–27, 2022	2022 World Championships	4; 67.36	4; 124.38	4; 191.74
February 18–19, 2022	2022 Winter Olympics	9; 66.11	8; 126.33	9; 192.44
February 4–7, 2022	2022 Winter Olympics – Team event	6; 64.79	—	6T
January 10–16, 2022	2022 European Championships	6; 61.93	4; 122.12	4; 184.05
December 9–11, 2021	2021 CS Golden Spin of Zagreb	1; 66.95	8; 112.38	7; 179.33
September 22–25, 2021	2021 CS Nebelhorn Trophy	1; 66.46	3; 111.70	3; 178.16

==== Junior results ====
2021–2022 season
Date	Event	SP	FS	Total
April 13–17, 2022	2022 World Junior Championships	1; 67.77	1; 120.35	1; 188.12
October 6–9, 2021	2021 JGP Austria	3; 63.04	3; 116.23	3; 179.27
September 1–4, 2021	2021 JGP Slovakia	3; 57.64	2; 110.62	2; 168.26
