= 2022 CS Golden Spin of Zagreb =

Figure skating competition

- Type: ISU Challenger Series
- Date: December 7 – 10
- Season: 2022–23
- Location: Sisak, Croatia
- Host: Croatian Skating Federation
- Venue: Ledena dvorana Zibel

Champions
- Men's singles: (United States) Camden Pulkinen
- Women's singles: (United States) Lindsay Thorngren
- Pairs: (United States) Anastasiia Smirnova / Danylo Siianytsia
- Ice dance: (United States) Christina Carreira / Anthony Ponomarenko
- Previous: 2021 CS Golden Spin of Zagreb
- Next: 2023 CS Golden Spin of Zagreb
- Previous CS: 2022 CS Warsaw Cup

The 2022 CS Golden Spin of Zagreb was held on December 7–10, 2022, in Sisak, Croatia. It was part of the 2022–23 ISU Challenger Series. Medals were awarded in men's singles, women's singles, pair skating, and ice dance.

== Entries ==
The International Skating Union published the list of entries on November 17, 2022.

Country	Men	Women	Pairs	Ice dance
Argentina		Sophia Natalie Dayan		
Armenia	Semen Daniliants			Viktoriia Azroian / Artur Gruzdev
Australia				Holly Harris / Jason Chan
Austria			Sophia Schaller / Livio Mayr	
Azerbaijan				Samantha Ritter / Daniel Brykalov
Belgium		Jade Hovine; Nina Pinzarrone		
Bulgaria	Beat Schuemperli; Alexander Zlatkov	Ivelina Baycheva; Simona Georgieva		
Canada	Corey Circelli	Madeline Schizas	Lia Pereira / Trennt Michaud	
Chile		Yae-Mia Neira		
China			Wang Huidi / Jia Ziqi; Zhang Siyang / Yang Yongchao	
Croatia		Hana Cvijanović		
Cyprus		Marilena Kitromilis		
Czech Republic			Federica Simoli / Alessandro Zarbo	
Estonia	Aleksandr Selevko; Mihhail Selevko	Nataly Langerbaur		
Finland		Emmi Peltonen		
France		Maé-Bérénice Méité	Aurélie Faula / Théo Belle	
Georgia				Maria Kazakova / Georgy Reviya
Germany	Denis Gurdzhi	Kristina Isaev; Nicole Schott	Alisa Efimova / Ruben Blommaert	Jennifer Janse van Rensburg / Benjamin Steffan; Lara Luft / Maximilian Pfisterer
Hungary			Maria Pavlova / Alexei Sviatchenko	
Israel	Mark Gorodnitsky; Lev Vinokur	Ella Chen		
Italy	Matteo Rizzo	Lara Naki Gutmann; Ester Schwarz		Leia Dozzi / Pietro Papetti
Kazakhstan	Dias Jirenbayev; Mikhail Shaidorov	Sofiya Farafonova; Anna Levkovets; Bagdana Rakhishova		
Latvia				Aurelija Ipolito / Luke Russell
Lithuania				Allison Reed / Saulius Ambrulevičius
Mexico		Andrea Astrain Maynez		
Netherlands		Lindsay van Zundert	Daria Danilova / Michel Tsiba; Nika Osipova / Dmitry Epstein	Hanna Jakucs / Alessio Galli; Chelsea Verhaegh / Sherim van Geffen
New Zealand				Isabelle Guise / Ethan Alday; Charlotte Lafond-Fournier / Richard Kang-in Kam
Philippines	Edrian Paul Celestino		Isabella Gamez / Alexander Korovin	
Poland				Olexandra Borysova / Aaron Freeman
Slovakia		Ema Doboszová; Alexandra Michaela Filcová		Maria Sofia Pucherová / Nikita Lysak; Anna Šimová / Kirill Aksenov
South Africa			Julia Mauder / Johannes Wilkinson	
Sweden			Greta Crafoord / John Crafoord	
Switzerland	Noah Bodenstein	Yasmine Kimiko Yamada		
Ukraine		Anastasia Gozhva		Zoe Larson / Andrii Kapran
United States	Camden Pulkinen	Bradie Tennell; Lindsay Thorngren	Ellie Kam / Danny O'Shea; Katie McBeath / Nathan Bartholomay; Anastasiia Smirnova / Danylo Siianytsia	Christina Carreira / Anthony Ponomarenko; Eva Pate / Logan Bye; Emilea Zingas / Vadym Kolesnik

== Changes to preliminary assignments ==
Date	Discipline	Withdrew	Added	Notes	Ref.
November 22	Men	(Germany) Louis Weissert	—		
November 22	Men	(Poland) Vladimir Samoilov	—		
November 22	Men	(Slovenia) David Sedej	—		
November 22	Women	(Austria) Stefanie Pesendorfer	—		
November 22	Women	(Poland) Ekaterina Kurakova	—		
November 22	Pairs	(Germany) Annika Hocke / Robert Kunkel	—		
November 22	Ice dance	(Israel) Mariia Nosovitskaya / Mikhail Nosovitskiy	(Lithuania) Allison Reed / Saulius Ambrulevičius		
November 28	Men	(Italy) Daniel Grassl	—	Event conflict	
November 28	Men	(United States) Ilia Malinin	—	Event conflict	
November 28	Women	(Austria) Olga Mikutina	—		
November 28	Women	(Estonia) Eva-Lotta Kiibus	—		
November 28	Women	(Italy) Anna Pezzetta	—		
November 28	Women	(Switzerland) Kimmy Repond	—		
November 28	Women	(Thailand) Thita Lamsam	—		
November 28	Women	(United States) Isabeau Levito	(United States) Lindsay Thorngren	Event conflict	
November 28	Pairs	(France) Camille Kovalev / Pavel Kovalev	—		
November 28	Pairs	(France) Océane Piegad / Denys Strekalin	(France) Aurélie Faula / Théo Belle		
November 28	Pairs	(Italy) Sara Conti / Niccolò Macii	—	Event conflict	
November 28	Pairs	(Italy) Rebecca Ghilardi / Filippo Ambrosini	—	Event conflict	
November 28	Pairs	(United States) Emily Chan / Spencer Akira Howe	(United States) Katie McBeath / Nathan Bartholomay	Event conflict	
November 28	Ice dance	(France) Loïcia Demougeot / Théo Le Mercier	—		
November 28	Ice dance	(France) Marie Dupayage / Thomas Nabais	—		
November 29	Men	(United States) Tomoki Hiwatashi	—		
November 29	Women	(United States) Ava Marie Ziegler	—		
December 5	Men	(Croatia) Charles Henry Katanović	—		
December 5	Men	(Ukraine) Andrii Kokura	—		
December 5	Women	(Croatia) Dora Hus	—		
December 7	Women	(Romania) Julia Sauter	—		
December 7	Women	(Slovenia) Daša Grm	—		
December 7	Pairs	(France) Louise Ehrhard / Matthis Pelegris	—		
December 7	Pairs	(Italy) Irma Caldara / Riccardo Maglio	—		
December 7	Ice dance	(Czech Republic) Denisa Cimlová / Joti Polizoakis	—		
December 7	Ice dance	(Germany) Charise Matthaei / Max Liebers	—		

== Results ==
=== Men ===
Rank	Name	Nation	Total points	SP		FS	
1	Camden Pulkinen	United States	242.09	1	85.45	2	156.64
2	Matteo Rizzo	Italy	228.86	6	68.79	1	160.07
3	Mihhail Selevko	Estonia	217.51	2	77.32	4	140.19
4	Mikhail Shaidorov	Kazakhstan	211.21	3	73.97	5	137.24
5	Aleksandr Selevko	Estonia	211.11	7	65.18	3	145.93
6	Mark Gorodnitsky	Israel	203.42	4	71.93	7	131.49
7	Corey Circelli	Canada	193.65	9	60.03	6	133.62
8	Alexander Zlatkov	Bulgaria	188.07	8	62.14	8	125.93
9	Dias Jirenbayev	Kazakhstan	180.31	10	56.19	9	124.12
10	Edrian Paul Celestino	Philippines	178.35	5	69.46	12	107.15
11	Lev Vinokur	Israel	159.76	12	49.95	11	109.81
12	Noah Bodenstein	Switzerland	158.32	13	48.46	10	109.86
13	Denis Gurdzhi	Germany	156.24	11	51.66	14	104.58
14	Beat Schümperli	Hungary	154.46	14	47.31	13	107.15
15	Semen Daniliants	Armenia	138.79	15	45.09	15	93.70

=== Women ===
Rank	Name	Nation	Total points	SP		FS	
1	Lindsay Thorngren	United States	196.48	2	60.49	1	135.99
2	Bradie Tennell	United States	193.31	1	68.84	4	124.47
3	Madeline Schizas	Canada	183.28	4	58.66	3	124.62
4	Lara Naki Gutmann	Italy	175.71	9	50.06	2	125.65
5	Lindsay van Zundert	Netherlands	174.81	3	58.66	5	116.15
6	Kristina Isaev	Germany	163.79	11	49.47	6	114.32
7	Nicole Schott	Germany	162.96	6	52.36	9	110.60
8	Jade Hovine	Belgium	161.66	10	49.51	8	112.15
9	Yasmine Kimiko Yamada	Switzerland	159.62	17	47.35	7	112.27
10	Anastasia Gozhva	Ukraine	155.23	7	52.35	10	102.88
11	Marilena Kitromilis	Cyprus	150.01	5	54.58	14	95.43
12	Anna Levkovets	Kazakhstan	146.57	13	48.65	12	97.92
13	Maé-Bérénice Méité	France	146.25	18	46.86	11	99.39
14	Nataly Langerbaur	Estonia	144.40	15	47.85	13	96.55
15	Ester Schwarz	Italy	136.42	16	47.76	15	88.66
16	Emmi Peltonen	Finland	133.15	14	48.41	17	84.74
17	Hana Cvijanović	Croatia	131.48	19	44.92	16	86.56
18	Ema Doboszová	Slovakia	127.05	8	50.07	20	76.98
19	Sofiya Farafonova	Kazakhstan	125.64	12	48.67	21	76.97
20	Ella Chen	Israel	120.67	22	42.68	18	77.99
21	Alexandra Michaela Filcová	Slovakia	118.84	21	43.38	22	75.46
22	Yae-Mia Neira	Chile	115.09	23	41.50	24	73.59
23	Andrea Astrain Maynez	Mexico	113.74	26	35.85	19	77.89
24	Simona Georgieva	Bulgaria	112.53	25	39.53	25	73.00
25	Sophia Natalie Dayan	Argentina	110.57	27	35.66	23	74.91
26	Bagdana Rakhishova	Kazakhstan	107.49	24	41.39	26	66.10
27	Ivelina Baycheva	Bulgaria	98.54	28	34.40	27	64.14
WD	Nina Pinzarrone	Belgium	withdrew	20	44.79	withdrew from competition	

=== Pairs ===
Rank	Name	Nation	Total points	SP		FS	
1	Anastasiia Smirnova / Danylo Siianytsia	United States	179.26	2	62.44	1	116.82
2	Ellie Kam / Danny O'Shea	United States	178.83	3	62.07	2	116.76
3	Lia Pereira / Trennt Michaud	Canada	176.88	4	61.13	3	115.75
4	Nika Osipova / Dmitry Epstein	Netherlands	167.14	7	58.10	4	109.04
5	Alisa Efimova / Ruben Blommaert	Germany	165.40	1	65.79	7	99.61
6	Katie McBeath / Nathan Bartholomay	United States	162.81	5	60.68	6	102.13
7	Zhang Siyang / Yang Yongchao	China	161.33	8	56.44	5	104.89
8	Daria Danilova / Michel Tsiba	Netherlands	156.96	6	58.17	8	98.79
9	Maria Pavlova / Alexei Sviatchenko	Hungary	151.25	9	53.58	9	97.67
10	Wang Huidi / Jia Ziqi	China	144.27	12	46.87	10	97.40
11	Sophia Schaller / Livio Mayr	Austria	132.96	10	47.46	11	85.50
12	Greta Crafoord / John Crafoord	Sweden	125.68	11	47.13	12	78.55
13	Federica Simoli / Alessandro Zarbo	Czech Republic	117.99	13	42.65	13	75.34
14	Julia Mauder / Johannes Wilkinson	South Africa	102.43	15	38.95	14	63.48
WD	Isabella Gamez / Alexander Korovin	Philippines	withdrew	14	39.71	withdrew from competition	
WD	Aurélie Faula / Théo Belle	France	withdrew from competition				

=== Ice dance ===
Rank	Name	Nation	Total points	RD		FD	
1	Christina Carreira / Anthony Ponomarenko	United States	191.31	2	76.54	1	114.77
2	Allison Reed / Saulius Ambrulevičius	Lithuania	189.47	1	77.21	2	112.26
3	Emilea Zingas / Vadym Kolesnik	United States	184.10	3	73.14	3	110.96
4	Eva Pate / Logan Bye	United States	174.44	7	65.64	4	108.80
5	Maria Kazakova / Georgy Reviya	Georgia	173.43	5	68.84	5	104.59
6	Jennifer Janse van Rensburg / Benjamin Steffan	Germany	172.92	4	69.92	6	103.00
7	Holly Harris / Jason Chan	Australia	165.02	6	66.64	7	98.38
8	Anna Šimová / Kirill Aksenov	Slovakia	159.14	9	61.90	8	97.24
9	Leia Dozzi / Pietro Papetti	Italy	156.88	8	65.46	11	91.42
10	Charlotte Lafond-Fournier / Richard Kang-in Kam	New Zealand	153.83	10	60.10	10	93.73
11	Lara Luft / Maximilian Pfisterer	Germany	147.24	12	57.22	13	90.02
12	Viktoriia Azroian / Artur Gruzdev	Armenia	146.47	15	51.53	9	94.94
13	Maria Sofia Pucherová / Nikita Lysak	Slovakia	145.32	11	58.35	15	86.97
14	Aurelija Ipolito / Luke Russell	Latvia	144.45	13	53.49	12	90.96
15	Samantha Ritter / Daniel Brykalov	Azerbaijan	138.92	16	50.56	14	88.36
16	Hanna Jakucs / Alessio Galli	Netherlands	136.30	14	53.40	17	82.90
17	Zoe Larson / Andrii Kapran	Ukraine	132.78	17	48.70	16	84.08
18	Chelsea Verhaegh / Sherim van Geffen	Netherlands	116.13	20	43.28	18	72.75
19	Olexandra Borysova / Aaron Freeman	Poland	112.87	18	45.08	19	67.79
20	Isabelle Guise / Ethan Alday	New Zealand	112.53	19	44.76	20	67.77
