= Mihhail Selevko =

Estonian figure skater (born 2002)

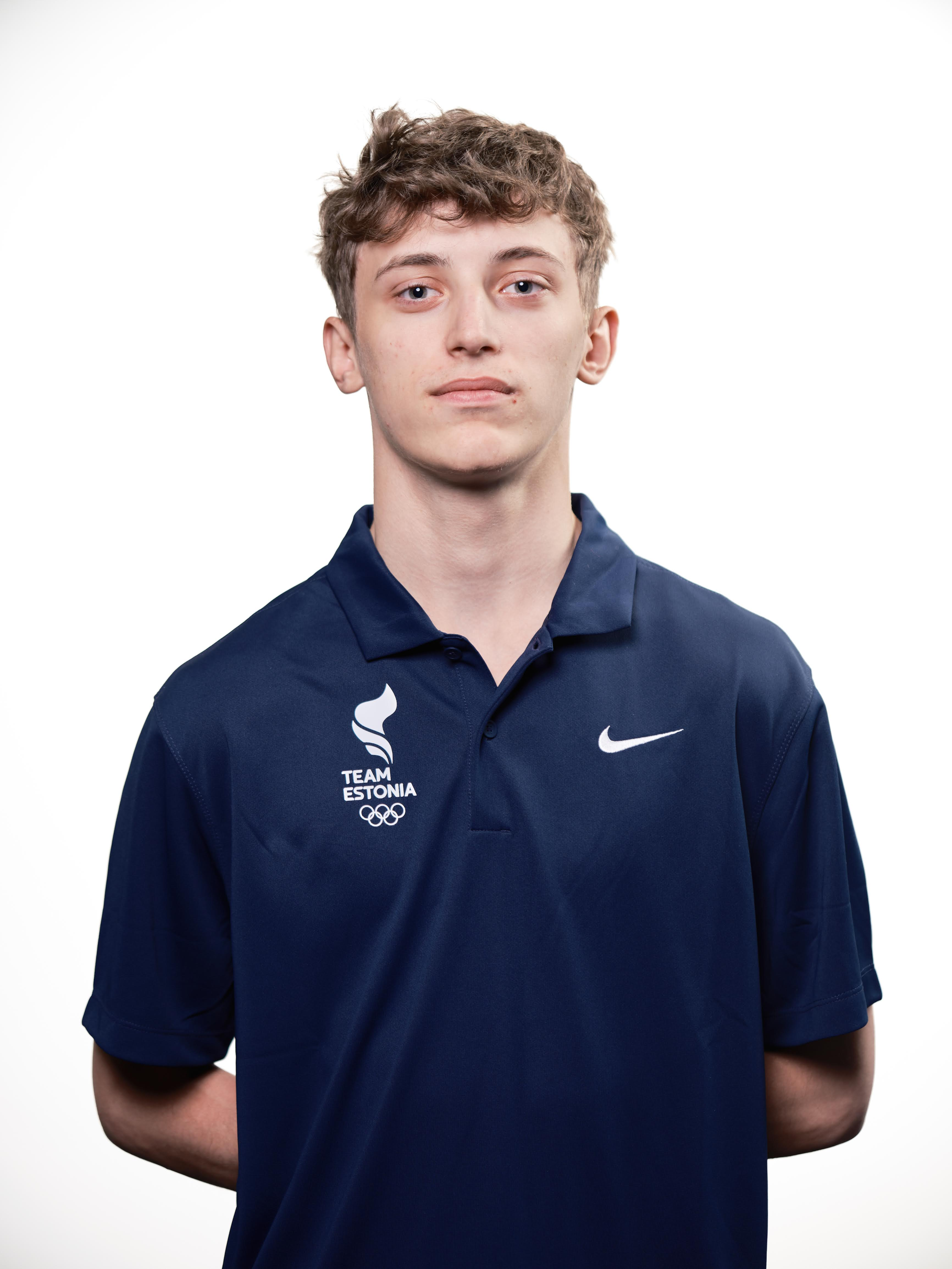
- Mihhail Selevko in 2025

Personal information
- Born: 20 November 2002 (age 24) Tallinn, Estonia
- Height: 1.79 m (5 ft 10 1/2 in)

Figure skating career
- Country: Estonia
- Discipline: Men's singles
- Coach: Svetlana Varnavskaja
- Skating club: Kristalluisk Figure Skating Club
- Began skating: 2005

Medal record
Estonian Championships
Gold medal – first place	2019 Tallinn	Singles
Gold medal – first place	2023 Tallinn	Singles
Gold medal – first place	2024 Tallinn	Singles
Gold medal – first place	2025 Tallinn	Singles
Silver medal – second place	2020 Tallinn	Singles
Silver medal – second place	2026 Tallinn	Singles
Bronze medal – third place	2021 Tallinn	Singles
Bronze medal – third place	2022 Tallinn	Singles

Mihhail Selevko (born 20 November 2002) is an Estonian figure skater. He is the 2026 Finlandia Trophy gold medalist, 2026 Skate Canada International bronze medalist, a five-time ISU Challenger Series medalist (2 gold, 3 bronze) and a four-time Estonian national champion (2019, 2023–25).

At the junior level, he is the 2019 European Youth Olympic Festival silver medalist and a two-time Estonian junior national champion (2019, 2022).

He is the first skater from Estonia to win a senior Grand Prix.

== Personal life ==
Selevko was born on 20 November 2002, in Tallinn, Estonia. His mother Galina is an accountant and his father Anatoli is a computer programmer. Selevko's older brother, Aleksandr, also represents Estonia internationally in figure skating. He can speak Estonian, Russian, and English fluently, and is also learning Finnish.

He is a student at the South-Eastern Finland University of Applied Sciences in Kouvola, where he studies game design.

== Career ==
=== Early career ===
Selevko began figure skating in 2005, following his older brother into the sport.

He won the Estonian Novice Championships in 2015 and 2016.

=== 2016–17 season: Junior international debut ===
Beginning his season on the junior level at the 2016 Lombardia Trophy, Selevko finished in ninth place. He went on to make his debut on the Junior Grand Prix series, placing twenty-fourth at the 2016 JGP Estonia. He then competed at the 2016 Volvo Open Cup and the 2016 Tallinn Trophy, where he finished thirteenth and ninth, respectively.

At the 2017 Estonian Championships, Selevko placed fifth on the senior level and third on the junior level. He also won the gold medal at the 2017 Jégvirág Cup on the advanced novice level, before closing his season with a bronze medal win at the 2017 Egna Spring Trophy.

=== 2017–18 season ===
Selevko began his season competing on the Junior Grand Prix series, finishing eighteenth at the 2017 JGP Latvia and fifteenth at the 2017 JGP Belarus. Going on to compete at the 2017 Volvo Open Cup and the 2017 Tallinn Trophy, Selevko finished tenth and eleventh, respectively.

Selevko won the silver medal at the 2018 Estonian Junior Championships. He ended the season with a gold medal at the 2018 Tallink Hotels Cup.

=== 2018–19 season: Estonian senior and junior national title ===
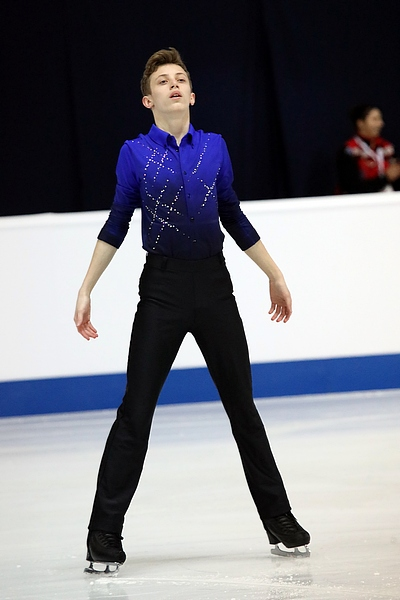
Selevko at the 2019 World Junior Championships

Competing on the Junior Grand Prix series, Selevko began his season with a twelfth-place finish at the 2018 JGP Lithuania and an eleventh-place finish at the 2018 JGP Czech Republic.

He went on to compete at the 2018 Ice Star and the 2018 Tallinn Trophy, where he finished in ninth place and fifth place, respectively. At the 2019 Estonian Championships, Selevko won the gold medal at both the senior and junior-level championships.

Assigned to compete at the 2019 European Youth Olympic Winter Games, Selevko won the silver medal. He then went on to compete at the 2019 World Junior Championships in Zagreb, Croatia, where he finished in twenty-seventh place.

=== 2019–20 season: Senior international debut ===
On the Junior Grand Prix series, Selevko placed tenth at the 2019 JGP Russia and ninth at the 2019 JGP Italy.

Debuting on the senior international level, Selevko finished in fifth place at the 2019 Ice Star and won the gold medal at the 2019 Tallinn Trophy.

At the 2020 Estonian Championships, Selevko won silver medals at both the senior and junior-level championships. He went on to win gold medals on the senior level at the 2020 Tallink Hotels Cup and 2020 Mentor Toruń Cup.

=== 2020–21 season ===
Selevko began his season at the 2020 Nebelhorn Trophy, where he finished in ninth place. He then went on to win the bronze medal at the 2021 Estonian Championships.

=== 2021–22 season: World Championships debut ===
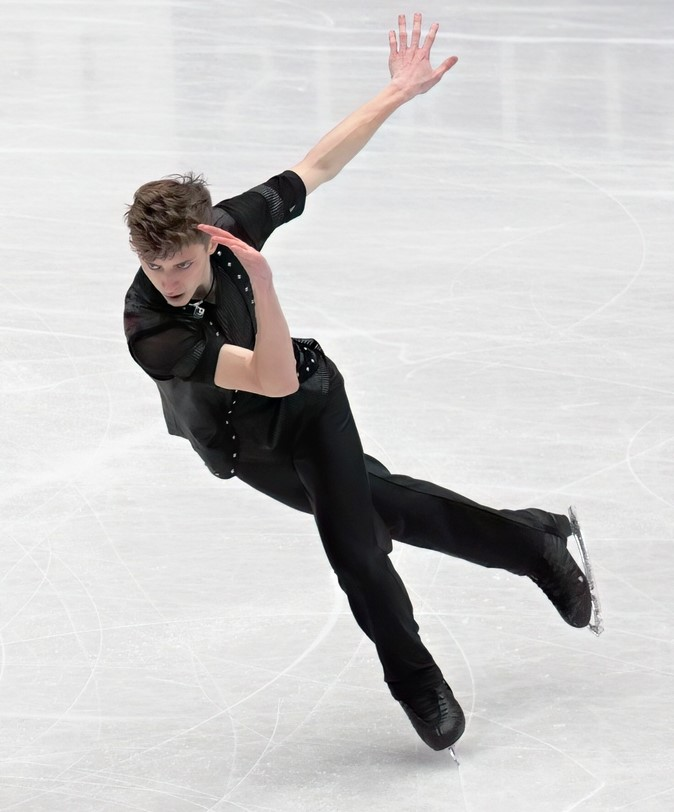
Selevko performing his short program at the 2022 World Championships

Competing on the Junior Grand Prix series, Selevko finished in sixth place at both the 2021 JGP Russia and the 2021 JGP Austria. Selevko went on to compete at the 2021 Denis Ten Memorial Challenge, the 2021 Cup of Austria, and the 2021 Golden Spin of Zagreb, placing seventh, fourth, and fourteenth, respectively.

At the 2022 Estonian Championships, Selevko won the bronze medal at the senior championships and the gold medal at the junior championships. Going on to compete at the 2022 International Challenge Cup, Selevko won the silver medal.

Making his World Championship debut at the 2022 World Championships, Selevko finished twentieth in the short program, qualifying for the free skate segment of the competition. He then placed thirteenth in the free skate and finished in fifteenth place overall. He also competed at the 2022 World Junior Championships in Tallinn. Selevko placed third in the short program, but ninth in the free skate, dropping to sixth place overall.

=== 2022–23 season: Grand Prix and European Championships debut ===
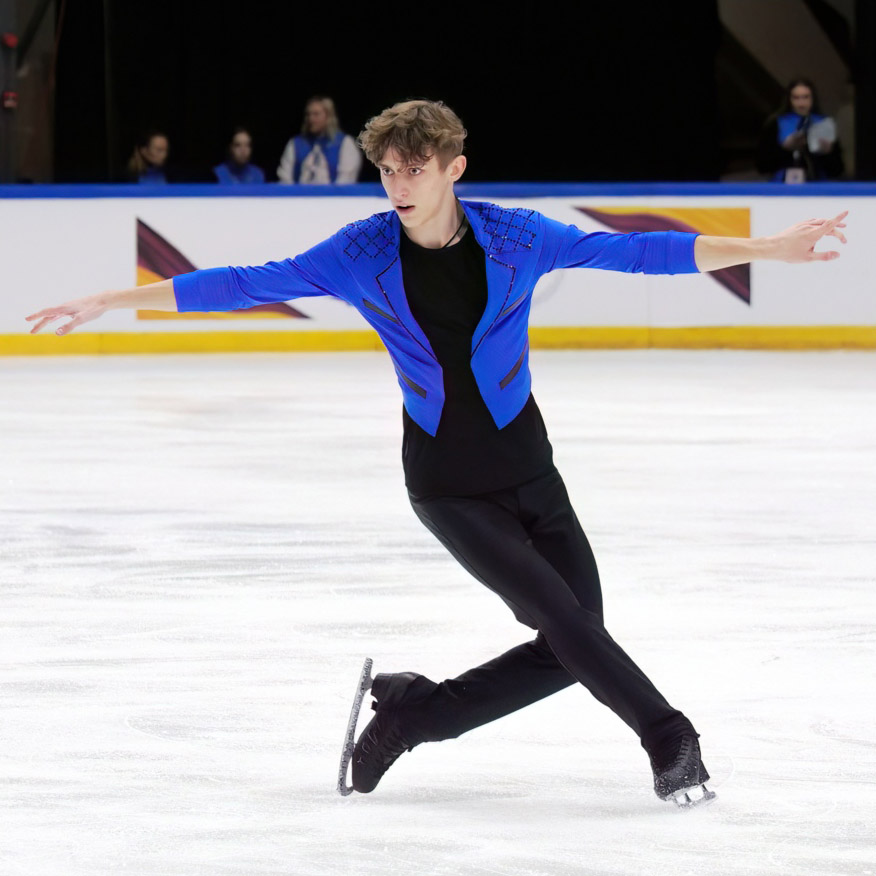
Selevko at the 2022 CS Finlandia Trophy

Selevko began his season at the 2022 Nebelhorn Trophy, where he finished in eleventh place. He went on to compete at the 2022 Finlandia Trophy, finishing in fourth place. Making his debut on the Grand Prix series, he finished eleventh at 2022 Skate America and ninth at the 2022 Grand Prix de France.

Selevko won the bronze medal at the 2022 Golden Spin of Zagreb. At the 2023 Estonian Championships, he won his second senior national title and was ultimately selected to compete at both the European and World Championships.

Competing at the 2023 European Championships, Selevko placed eleventh in the short program and eighth in the free skate, finishing in eighth place overall. His placement earned two spots for Estonian men's singles skaters at the 2024 European Championships. Selevko then went on to compete at the 2023 International Challenge Cup, where he finished in eleventh place.

At the 2023 World Championships, Selevko placed fifteenth in the short program and seventeenth in the free skate, finishing seventeenth overall.

=== 2023–24 season ===
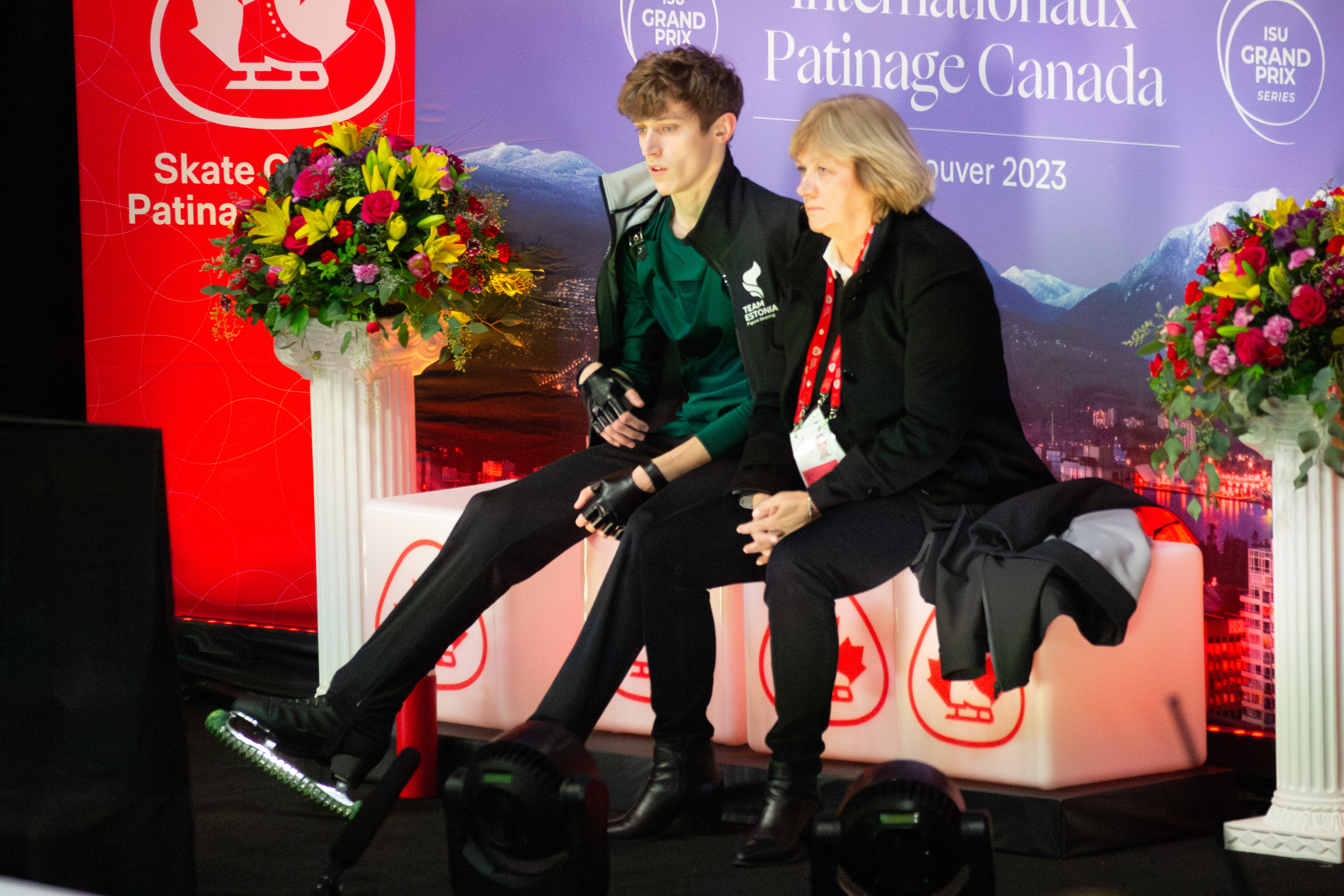
Selevko (left) in the kiss and cry area at 2023 Skate Canada International with longtime coach, Irina Kononova

Beginning the season with two Challenger Series assignments in consecutive weeks, Selevko finished in fifth place at the 2023 Finlandia Trophy and fourth place at the 2023 Budapest Trophy.

Going on to compete on the 2023–24 Grand Prix circuit, Selevko finished eleventh at 2023 Skate Canada International and twelfth at the 2023 NHK Trophy. In December, Selevko won his third national title at the 2024 Estonian Championships.

Selected to compete at the 2024 European Championships in Kaunas, Lithuania, Selevko would finish a disappointing thirtieth in the short program after falling twice, failing to advance to the free skate segment of the competition. His brother, Aleksandr, would win silver at the event, becoming the first Estonian skater to ever medal at a European Championships in any discipline.

=== 2024–25 season ===
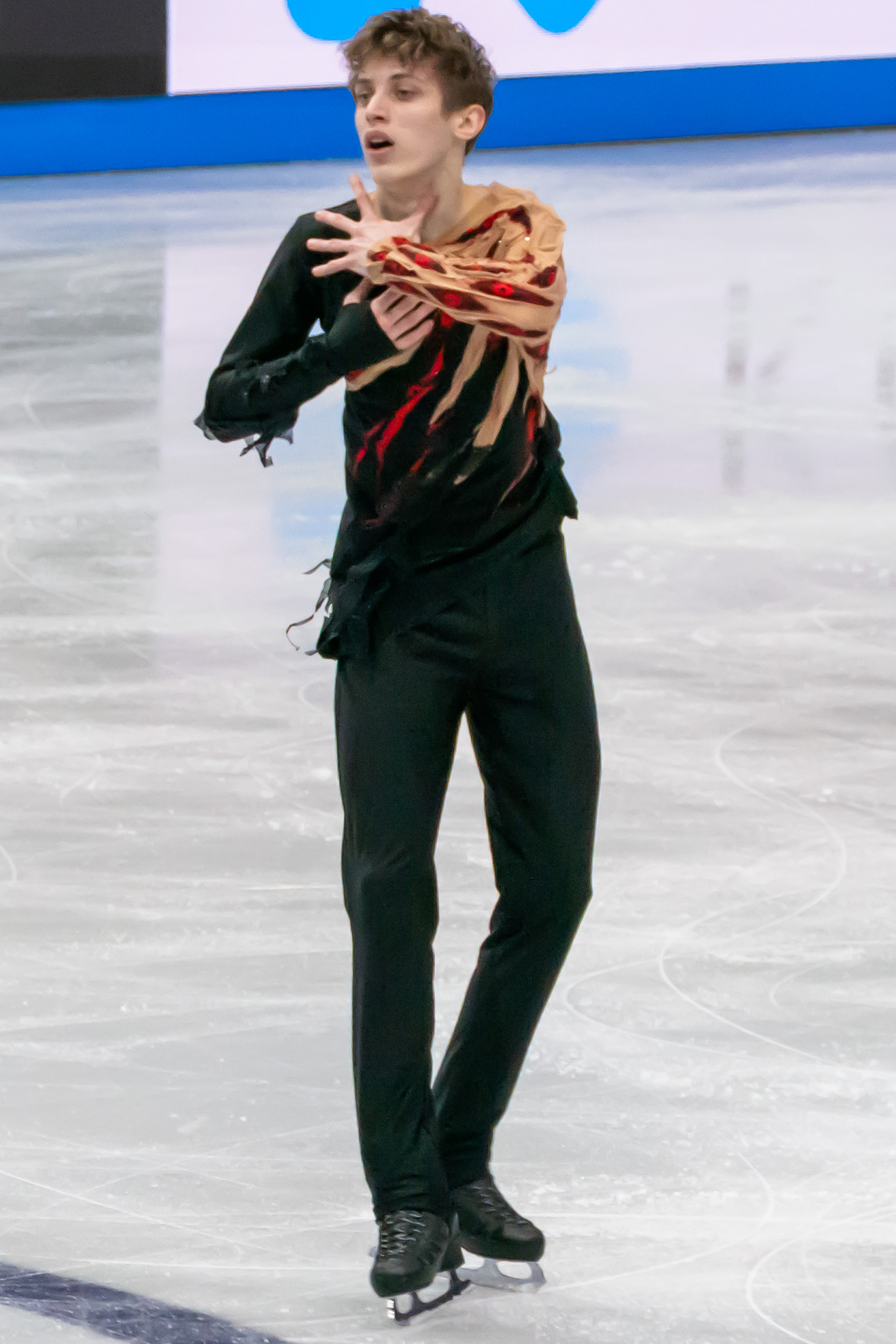
Selevko performing his short program at the 2025 World Championships

Selevko began the season by competing on the 2024–25 ISU Challenger Series, winning bronze at the 2024 Trophée Métropole Nice Côte d'Azur and finishing ninth at the 2024 Tallinn Trophy. He followed these results up by winning gold at the 2024 Golden Spin of Zagreb. One week following that event, Selevko won his fourth national title at the 2025 Estonian Championships.

In February, Selevko placed seventh overall at 2025 Europeans. “It was a really good experience,” said Selevko. "I feel very happy. I feel really happy that I landed the quad loop. I tried it a couple of times in competition, not so successful. I landed it in nationals, but oh well. Overall, I’m very happy that I managed more or less well with this program."

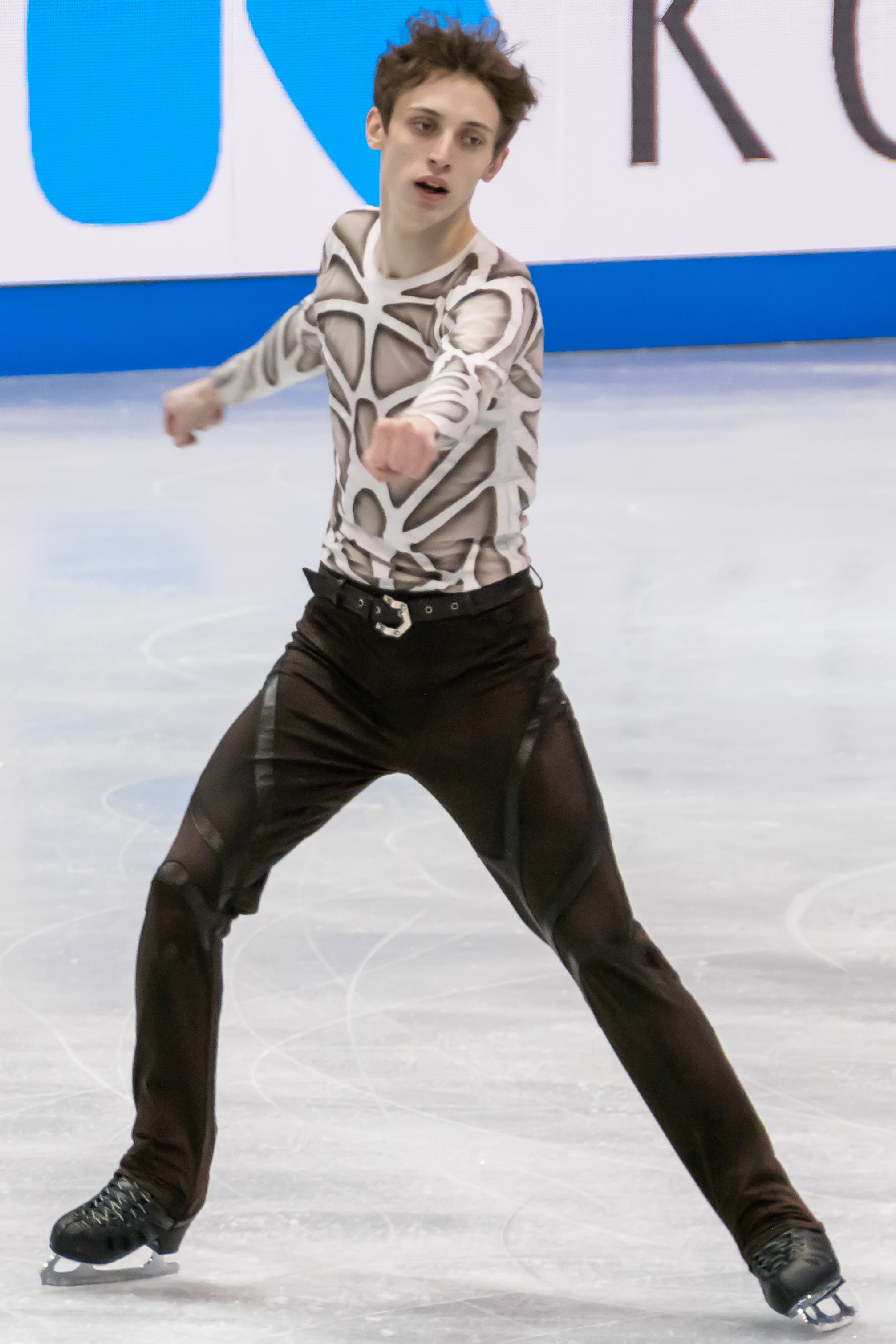
Selevko performing his free skate at the 2025 World Championships

Ahead of the 2025 World Championships in Boston, Massachusetts, United States, Selevko was ill and experienced pain in his leg that bothered him when walking. He placed nineteenth in the short program after falling on a quadruple toe loop jump. He struggled in the free skate as well, falling again on an attempted quad jump and popping several jumps into doubles and finishing in nineteenth place overall.

=== 2025–26 season ===
Selevko opened his season by finishing fourth at the 2025 CS Nepela Memorial. He went on to compete on the 2025–26 Grand Prix series, placing eighth at the 2025 Grand Prix de France and at the 2025 Finlandia Trophy.

In December, he finished twelfth at the 2025 CS Golden Spin of Zagreb and won the silver medal at the 2026 Estonian Championships behind his brother, Aleksandr. The following month, he competed at the 2026 European Championships, where he placed third in the short program but eleventh in the free skate, dropping to sixth place overall just behind Aleksandr. "It was definitely a fight through the program,” said the 23-year-old of his free skate. "I was trying to take it one jump at a time, but yeah, I'm a bit disappointed."

In April, it was announced that Selevko had made a coaching change, leaving longtime coach, Irina Kononova, to begin training under Svetlana Varnavskaja.

=== 2026–27 season ===
Selevko began his season at the 2026 CS Lombardia Trophy, winning the competition and setting a new personal best score of 260.87. Selevko subsequently placed third at 2026 Skate Canada International, placing fifth in the short program and first in the free skate. “The Grand Prix doesn't go well for me,” he said after the free skate. “It's usually my worst competition of the whole season. I'm very pleased with the performance and with the medal and everything, and I'm hoping to do even better at the next Grand Prix.”

Three weeks later, Selevko competed at 2026 Finlandia Trophy where he claimed the first Grand Prix gold medal in singles figure skating for Estonia. In doing so, he qualified for the 2026–27 Grand Prix of Figure Skating Final. “I still can’t quite believe I’ve actually done it. It feels incredible!” he said after winning. He expressed gratitude to his team and everyone who has supported him, adding that he was looking forward to returning home to prepare for the Grand Prix Final. “It honestly feels unbelievable!”

== Programs ==
Season	Short program	Free skate	Exhibition	Ref.
2016–17	Prince of Persia: The Sands of Time By Harry Gregson-Williams Choreo. by Mikhail Pochitalin	Hugo By Howard Shore Choreo. by Valentin Molotov		
2017–18	"Ghost Town" By Adam Lambert Choreo. by Valentin Molotov	Hugo By Howard Shore Choreo. by Valentin Molotov		
2018–19	"Perfect" By Ed Sheeran Choreo. by Valentin Molotov	The Last of the Mohicans By Trevor Jones & Randy Edelman Choreo. by Mikhail Pochitalin		
2019–20	"Nothing Else Matters" By Metallica Choreo. by Denis Lunin	The Last of the Mohicans By Trevor Jones & Randy Edelman Choreo. by Mikhail Pochitalin		
2020–21	"Nothing Else Matters" By Metallica Choreo. by Denis Lunin	House of Flying Daggers By Shigeru Umebayashi Choreo. by Denis Lunin		
2021–22	"Nothing Else Matters" By Metallica Choreo. by Denis Lunin	House of Flying Daggers By Shigeru Umebayashi Choreo. by Denis Lunin		
2022–23	"Break My Baby" By Kaleo Choreo. by Rostislav Sinicyn	Arcane; "What Could Have Been" (orchestral version) By Samuel Kim; "What Could Have Been" By Sting & Ray Chen Choreo. by Rostislav Sinicyn		
2023–24	"Break My Baby" By Kaleo Choreo. by Rostislav Sinicyn	Game of Thrones; "Light of the Seven"; "Dragonstone"; "Blood of My Blood" By Ramin Djawadi Choreo. by Rostislav Sinicyn		
2024–25	"The Sounds of Nightmares" By Tobias Lilja; "Mephisto's Lullaby" By Xtortion Audio; "Bodies (Main Theme)" By Jon Opstad; "Dracula (Nate Sees Cassie)" From Euphoria By Labrinth Choreo. by Adam Solya	Westworld; "Main Title Theme"; "Dr. Ford"; "I Don't Do Personals"; "Core Drive" By Ramin Djawadi Choreo. by Adam Solya	"Red Notice" (from Red Notice) By Steve Jablonsky; "Men in Black" (from Men in Black) By Will Smith; "Back in Time" (from Men in Black 3) By Pitbull	
2025–26	"The Sounds of Nightmares" By Tobias Lilja; "Mephisto's Lullaby" By Xtortion Audio; "Bodies (Main Theme)" By Jon Opstad; "Dracula (Nate Sees Cassie)" From Euphoria By Labrinth Choreo. by Adam Solya	X-Men: Dark Phoenix; "Dark"; "Gap"; "Insertion"; "Deletion"; "Frameshift" By Hans Zimmer Choreo. by Adam Solya	"Red Notice" (from Red Notice) By Steve Jablonsky; "Men in Black" (from Men in Black) By Will Smith; "Back in Time" (from Men in Black 3) By Pitbull; I Got You (I Feel Good) By James Brown Performed by Max Mutzke	
2026-27	"Channel 43" By Deadmau5, Wolfgang Gartner; "Opr" By Gesaffelstein Choreo. by Adam Solya	"Frostpunk Theme" By Piotr Musial; "Chaoticism" By Daniel Ciurlizza feat. Joni Fuller Choreo. by Adam Solya		

== Competitive highlights ==
- GP – Event of the ISU Grand Prix Series
- JGP – Event of the ISU Junior Grand Prix Series
- CS – Event of the ISU Challenger Series
- TBD – Assigned
- WD – Withdrew from competition

Competition placements at senior level
Season	2016–17	2018–19	2019–20	2020–21	2021–22	2022–23	2023–24	2024–25	2025–26	2026–27
World Championships					15th	17th		19th		
European Championships						8th	30th	7th	6th	
Estonian Championships	5th	1st	2nd	3rd	3rd	1st	1st	1st	2nd	
Grand Prix Final										TBD
GP Finland									8th	1st
GP NHK Trophy							12th			
GP Skate America						11th				
GP Skate Canada							11th			3rd
GP France						9th			8th	
CS Cup of Austria					4th					
CS Denis Ten Memorial					7th					
CS Finlandia Trophy						4th	5th			
CS Golden Spin of Zagreb					14th	3rd		1st	12th	
CS Ice Star			5th							
CS Lombardia Trophy										1st
CS Nebelhorn Trophy				9th		11th				
CS Nepela Memorial									4th	
CS Tallinn Trophy			1st					9th		
CS Trophée Métropole Nice								3rd		
CS Trialeti Trophy										3rd
CS Budapest Trophy							4th			
Sonja Henje Trophy								3rd		
Tallink Hotels Cup								6th		
Tallinn Open										1st
Challenge Cup					2nd	11th				
Mentor Toruń Cup			4th							

Competition placements at junior level
Season	2016–17	2017–18	2018–19	2019–20	2021–22
World Junior Championships			27th		6th
Estonian Championships	3rd	2nd	1st	2nd	1st
JGP Austria					6th
JGP Belarus		15th			
JGP Czech Republic			11th		
JGP Estonia	24th				
JGP Italy				9th	
JGP Latvia		18th			
JGP Lithuania			12th		
JGP Russia				10th	6th
Egna Spring Trophy	3rd				
European Youth Olympic Festival			2nd		
Ice Star			9th		
Lombardia Trophy	9th				
Tallink Hotels Cup		1st			
Tallinn Trophy	11th	11th	5th		
Volvo Open Cup	13th	10th			

== Detailed results ==
ISU personal best scores in the +5/-5 GOE System
Segment	Type	Score	Event
Total	TSS	260.87	2026 CS Lombardia Trophy
Short program	TSS	91.09	2026 CS Lombardia Trophy
Short program	TES	50.76	2026 CS Lombardia Trophy
Short program	PCS	40.74	2026 CS Trialeti Trophy
Free skating	TSS	169.98	2026 Finlandia Trophy
Free skating	TES	88.56	2026 Skate Canada International
Free skating	PCS	85.05	2026 Finlandia Trophy

=== Senior level ===
Results in the 2016–17 season
Date	Event	SP		FS		Total	
Date	Event	P	Score	P	Score	P	Score
9–11 Dec 2016	(Estonia) 2017 Estonian Championships	5	44.65	4	82.29	5	126.94

Results in the 2018–19 season
Date	Event	SP		FS		Total	
Date	Event	P	Score	P	Score	P	Score
14–16 Dec 2018	(Estonia) 2019 Estonian Championships	1	66.92	2	125.74	1	192.66

Results in the 2019–20 season
Date	Event	SP		FS		Total	
Date	Event	P	Score	P	Score	P	Score
18–20 Oct 2019	(Belarus) 2019 CS Ice Star	10	58.69	4	138.93	5	197.62
11–17 Nov 2019	(Estonia) 2019 Tallinn Trophy	1	73.86	2	135.96	1	209.82
13–15 Dec 2019	(Estonia) 2020 Estonian Championships	3	61.28	2	132.75	2	194.03
7–12 Jan 2020	(Poland) 2020 Mentor Toruń Cup	5	61.77	4	126.02	4	187.79
13–16 Feb 2020	(Estonia) 2020 Tallink Hotels Cup	4	76.44	10	121.15	6	197.59

Results in the 2020–21 season
Date	Event	SP		FS		Total	
Date	Event	P	Score	P	Score	P	Score
22–25 Sep 2020	(Germany) 2020 CS Nebelhorn Trophy	7	71.59	10	121.42	9	193.01
30–31 Jan 2021	(Estonia) 2021 Estonian Championships	1	79.55	3	107.70	3	187.25

Results in the 2021–22 season
Date	Event	SP		FS		Total	
Date	Event	P	Score	P	Score	P	Score
28–31 Oct 2021	(Kazakhstan) 2021 CS Denis Ten Memorial Challenge	3	78.80	10	121.28	7	200.08
11–14 Nov 2021	2021 CS Cup of Austria	2	82.61	7	138.50	4	221.11
4–5 Dec 2021	(Estonia) 2022 Estonian Championships	3	69.68	3	113.49	3	183.17
7–11 Dec 2021	(Croatia) 2021 CS Golden Spin of Zagreb	12	70.84	14	138.24	14	209.08
24–27 Feb 2022	(Netherlands) 2022 International Challenge Cup	3	79.86	2	161.66	2	241.52
21–27 Mar 2022	(France) 2022 World Championships	20	78.85	13	155.87	15	234.72

Results in the 2022–23 season
Date	Event	SP		FS		Total	
Date	Event	P	Score	P	Score	P	Score
21–24 Sep 2022	(Germany) 2022 CS Nebelhorn Trophy	9	67.28	11	115.81	11	183.09
4–9 Oct 2022	(Finland) 2022 CS Finlandia Trophy	3	79.79	6	140.54	4	220.33
21–23 Oct 2022	(United States) 2022 Skate America	7	75.75	12	116.05	11	191.80
4–6 Nov 2022	2022 Grand Prix de France	5	79.40	11	133.52	9	212.92
7–10 Dec 2022	(Croatia) 2022 CS Golden Spin of Zagreb	2	77.32	4	140.19	3	217.51
17–18 Dec 2022	(Estonia) 2023 Estonian Championships	2	77.34	1	154.09	1	231.43
25–29 Jan 2023	(Finland) 2023 European Championships	11	73.74	8	144.56	8	218.30
23–26 Feb 2023	(Netherlands) 2023 International Challenge Cup	6	74.38	12	121.15	11	195.53
22–26 Mar 2023	(Japan) 2023 World Championships	15	76.81	17	154.13	17	230.94

Results in the 2023–24 season
Date	Event	SP		FS		Total	
Date	Event	P	Score	P	Score	P	Score
6–8 Oct 2023	(Finland) 2023 CS Finlandia Trophy	5	78.54	5	145.41	5	223.95
13–15 Oct 2023	(Hungary) 2023 CS Budapest Trophy	2	82.11	9	137.07	4	219.18
27–29 Oct 2023	2023 Skate Canada International	12	70.18	9	140.60	11	210.78
24–26 Nov 2023	(Japan) 2023 NHK Trophy	6	81.31	12	126.27	12	207.58
16–17 Dec 2023	(Estonia) 2023 Estonian Championships	1	80.34	2	156.77	1	237.11
8–14 Jan 2024	(Lithuania) 2024 European Championships	30	60.09	—N/a	—N/a	30	60.09

Results in the 2024–25 season
Date	Event	SP		FS		Total	
Date	Event	P	Score	P	Score	P	Score
16–20 Oct 2024	(France) 2024 CS Trophée Métropole Nice Côte d'Azur	5	78.93	2	154.02	3	232.95
11–17 Nov 2024	(Estonia) 2024 CS Tallinn Trophy	1	76.78	11	125.96	9	202.74
4–7 Dec 2024	(Croatia) 2024 CS Golden Spin of Zagreb	1	86.20	1	158.86	1	245.06
14–15 Dec 2024	(Estonia) 2025 Estonian Championships	1	93.09	1	167.83	1	260.92
28 Jan – 2 Feb 2025	(Estonia) 2025 European Championships	6	84.85	7	154.15	7	239.00
6–9 Mar 2025	(Norway) 2025 Sonja Henje Trophy	3	76.65	3	150.64	3	227.29

Results in the 2025–26 season
Date	Event	SP		FS		Total	
Date	Event	P	Score	P	Score	P	Score
25–27 Sep 2025	(Slovakia) 2025 CS Nepela Memorial	6	77.75	4	151.45	4	229.20
17–19 Oct 2025	2025 Grand Prix de France	6	80.17	7	152.00	8	232.17
21–23 Nov 2025	(Finland) 2025 Finlandia Trophy	5	84.18	10	134.07	8	218.25
3–6 Dec 2025	(Croatia) 2025 CS Golden Spin of Zagreb	7	76.45	16	122.80	12	199.25
13–14 Dec 2025	(Estonia) 2026 Estonian Championships	2	86.93	2	157.99	2	247.62
13–18 Jan 2026	(United Kingdom) 2026 European Championships	3	88.28	11	142.02	6	230.30

Results in the 2026–27 season
Date	Event	SP		FS		Total	
Date	Event	P	Score	P	Score	P	Score
11–13 Sep 2026	(Estonia) 2026 Tallinn Open	1	85.36	1	166.55	1	251.91
17–20 Sep 2026	(Italy) 2026 CS Lombardia Trophy	1	91.09	1	169.78	1	260.87
1–4 Oct 2026	(Georgia (country)) 2026 CS Trialeti Trophy	2	87.87	5	139.87	3	227.74
30 Oct – 1 Nov 2026	2026 Skate Canada International	5	79.58	1	169.14	3	248.72
20–22 Nov 2026	(Finland) 2026 Finlandia Trophy	1	85.01	1	169.98	1	254.99

=== Junior level ===
Results in the 2016–17 season
Date	Event	SP		FS		Total	
Date	Event	P	Score	P	Score	P	Score
8–11 Sep 2016	(Italy) 2016 Lombardia Trophy	9	35.51	9	65.02	9	100.53
28 Sep – 1 Oct 2016	2016 JGP Estonia	18	48.02	25	80.56	24	128.58
9–13 Nov 2016	(Latvia) 2016 Volvo Open Cup	13	33.55	13	57.53	13	91.08
22–27 Nov 2016	(Estonia) 2016 Tallinn Trophy	11	34.67	–	–	11	34.67
6–8 Jan 2017	(Estonia) 2017 Estonian Championships (Junior)	3	49.83	3	105.35	3	155.18
6–9 Apr 2017	(Italy) 2017 Egna Spring Trophy	3	47.26	4	78.13	3	125.39

Results in the 2017–18 season
Date	Event	SP		FS		Total	
Date	Event	P	Score	P	Score	P	Score
6–9 Sep 2017	2017 JGP Latvia	16	49.28	18	87.26	18	136.54
20–23 Sep 2017	2017 JGP Belarus	13	51.73	17	83.58	15	135.31
8–12 Nov 2017	(Latvia) 2017 Volvo Open Cup	10	42.77	10	79.62	10	122.39
21–26 Nov 2017	(Estonia) 2017 Tallinn Trophy	7	54.17	11	91.74	11	145.91
2–4 Feb 2018	(Estonia) 2018 Estonian Championships (Junior)	2	53.21	1	105.88	2	159.09
15–18 Mar 2018	(Estonia) 2018 Tallink Hotels Cup	1	51.89	1	91.74	1	143.63

Results in the 2018–19 season
Date	Event	SP		FS		Total	
Date	Event	P	Score	P	Score	P	Score
5–8 Sep 2018	2018 JGP Lithuania	11	54.32	13	94.09	12	148.41
26–29 Sep 2018	2018 JGP Czech Republic	10	55.65	13	90.04	11	145.69
18–21 Oct 2018	(Belarus) 2018 Ice Star	10	46.50	7	97.53	9	144.03
26 Nov – 2 Dec 2018	(Estonia) 2018 Tallinn Trophy	5	55.51	4	109.36	5	164.87
5–6 Jan 2019	(Estonia) 2019 Estonian Championships (Junior)	1	56.93	1	108.43	1	165.36
22–24 Feb 2019	(Bosnia and Herzegovina) 2019 European Youth Olympic Winter Festival	2	68.31	5	111.98	2	180.29
4–10 Mar 2019	(Croatia) 2019 World Junior Championships	27	56.68	–	–	27	56.68

Results in the 2019–20 season
Date	Event	SP		FS		Total	
Date	Event	P	Score	P	Score	P	Score
11–14 Sep 2019	2019 JGP Russia	15	53.72	8	116.23	10	169.95
2–5 Oct 2019	2019 JGP Italy	11	61.55	8	128.31	9	189.86
1–2 Feb 2020	(Estonia) 2020 Estonian Championships (Junior)	2	61.24	2	128.77	2	190.01

Results in the 2021–22 season
Date	Event	SP		FS		Total	
Date	Event	P	Score	P	Score	P	Score
15–18 Aug 2021	2021 JGP Russia	6	69.30	7	130.53	6	199.83
6–9 Oct 2021	2021 JGP Austria	8	62.16	5	133.63	6	195.79
5–6 Feb 2022	(Estonia) 2022 Estonian Championships (Junior)	1	78.15	2	144.99	1	223.14
13–17 Apr 2022	(Estonia) 2022 World Junior Championships	3	81.26	9	137.42	6	218.68
