= 2022–23 ISU Grand Prix of Figure Skating =

Figure skating competition

- Type: Grand Prix
- Date: October 21 – December 11, 2022
- Season: 2022–23
- Previous: 2021–22 Grand Prix
- Next: 2023–24 Grand Prix

The 2022–23 ISU Grand Prix of Figure Skating was a series of senior international competitions organized by the International Skating Union that were held from October 2022 through December 2022. Medals were awarded in men's singles, women's singles, pair skating, and ice dance. Skaters earned points based on their placements at each event and the top six in each discipline qualified to compete at the Grand Prix Final in Turin, Italy. The corresponding series for junior-level skaters was the 2022–23 ISU Junior Grand Prix.

== Competitions ==
In April 2022, the ISU cancelled the Rostelecom Cup in response to the Russian invasion of Ukraine. The Grand Prix of Espoo was named as its replacement on July 14, 2022.

On May 10, 2022, the Chinese Skating Association informed the ISU that they could no longer host the Cup of China due to travel restrictions and quarantine requirements related to the COVID-19 pandemic. The MK John Wilson Trophy was chosen as the replacement.

The series included the following events.

Date	Event	Location	Results
October 21–23	(United States) 2022 Skate America	Norwood, Massachusetts, United States	Details
October 28–30	2022 Skate Canada International	Mississauga, Ontario, Canada	Details
November 4–6	2022 Grand Prix de France	Angers, France	Details
November 11–13	2022 Cup of China	Cancelled	
November 11–13	(United Kingdom) 2022 MK John Wilson Trophy	Sheffield, England, United Kingdom	Details
November 18–20	(Japan) 2022 NHK Trophy	Sapporo, Japan	Details
November 25–27	(Russia) 2022 Rostelecom Cup	Cancelled	
November 25–27	(Finland) 2022 Grand Prix of Espoo	Espoo, Finland	Details
December 8–11	(Italy) 2022–23 Grand Prix Final	Turin, Italy	Details

== Requirements ==
Skaters were eligible to compete on the senior Grand Prix circuit if they had reached the age of 15 before July 1, 2022. They were also required to have earned a minimum total score at certain international events.

== Assignments ==
=== Men's singles ===
Nation	Skater	Assignment(s)	
Canada	Wesley Chiu	Skate America	Grand Prix de France
Canada	Stephen Gogolev	Skate Canada International	NHK Trophy
Canada	Keegan Messing	Skate Canada International	Grand Prix of Espoo
Canada	Conrad Orzel	Skate Canada International	NHK Trophy
Canada	Roman Sadovsky	Skate America	MK John Wilson Trophy
Estonia	Aleksandr Selevko	Skate Canada International	Grand Prix of Espoo
Estonia	Mihhail Selevko	Skate America	Grand Prix de France
France	Adam Siao Him Fa	Grand Prix de France	NHK Trophy
Georgia	Nika Egadze	Grand Prix de France	NHK Trophy
Georgia	Morisi Kvitelashvili	MK John Wilson Trophy	Grand Prix of Espoo
Italy	Daniel Grassl	Skate America	MK John Wilson Trophy
Italy	Matteo Rizzo	Skate Canada International	NHK Trophy
Japan	Kao Miura	Skate America	Skate Canada International
Japan	Sena Miyake	Skate America	Grand Prix de France
Japan	Shun Sato	MK John Wilson Trophy	Grand Prix of Espoo
Japan	Koshiro Shimada	Skate America	MK John Wilson Trophy
Japan	Kazuki Tomono	Grand Prix de France	NHK Trophy
Japan	Tatsuya Tsuboi	MK John Wilson Trophy	Grand Prix of Espoo
Japan	Shoma Uno	Skate Canada International	NHK Trophy
Japan	Sōta Yamamoto	Grand Prix de France	NHK Trophy
Latvia	Deniss Vasiļjevs	Skate Canada International	MK John Wilson Trophy
South Korea	Cha Jun-hwan	Skate America	NHK Trophy
Switzerland	Lukas Britschgi	Skate Canada International	Grand Prix de France
United States	Tomoki Hiwatashi	MK John Wilson Trophy	NHK Trophy
United States	Jimmy Ma	Skate Canada International	MK John Wilson Trophy
United States	Ilia Malinin	Skate America	Grand Prix of Espoo
United States	Camden Pulkinen	Skate Canada International	Grand Prix of Espoo
Austria	Maurizio Zandron	NHK Trophy	
Canada	Corey Circelli	MK John Wilson Trophy	
Estonia	Arlet Levandi	Grand Prix of Espoo	
Finland	Valtter Virtanen	Grand Prix of Espoo	
France	Kévin Aymoz	Grand Prix of Espoo	
France	Luc Economides	Grand Prix de France	
France	Landry Le May	Grand Prix de France	
Great Britain	Edward Appleby	MK John Wilson Trophy	
Great Britain	Graham Newberry	MK John Wilson Trophy	
Italy	Gabriele Frangipani	NHK Trophy	
Japan	Lucas Tsuyoshi Honda	Grand Prix of Espoo	
Mexico	Donovan Carrillo	Skate America	
South Korea	Lee Si-hyeong	Grand Prix de France	
Sweden	Nikolaj Majorov	Grand Prix of Espoo	
Ukraine	Ivan Shmuratko	Grand Prix de France	
United States	Liam Kapeikis	Skate America	
United States	Dinh Tran	Skate America	

=== Women's singles ===
Nation	Skater	Assignment(s)	
Austria	Olga Mikutina	Grand Prix de France	NHK Trophy
Belgium	Loena Hendrickx	Grand Prix de France	Grand Prix of Espoo
Canada	Gabrielle Daleman	Skate Canada International	MK John Wilson Trophy
Canada	Madeline Schizas	Skate Canada International	Grand Prix of Espoo
Czech Republic	Eliška Březinová	Skate America	Skate Canada International
Estonia	Eva-Lotta Kiibus	NHK Trophy	Grand Prix of Espoo
Estonia	Niina Petrõkina	Skate Canada International	NHK Trophy
Georgia	Anastasiia Gubanova	MK John Wilson Trophy	Grand Prix of Espoo
Germany	Nicole Schott	Skate America	MK John Wilson Trophy
Japan	Mana Kawabe	Grand Prix de France	Grand Prix of Espoo
Japan	Rika Kihira	Skate Canada International	Grand Prix of Espoo
Japan	Rino Matsuike	Skate America	Grand Prix de France
Japan	Mai Mihara	MK John Wilson Trophy	Grand Prix of Espoo
Japan	Kaori Sakamoto	Skate America	NHK Trophy
Japan	Rion Sumiyoshi	Grand Prix de France	NHK Trophy
Japan	Rinka Watanabe	Skate Canada International	NHK Trophy
Netherlands	Lindsay van Zundert	Skate Canada International	Grand Prix de France
Poland	Ekaterina Kurakova	Skate America	MK John Wilson Trophy
South Korea	Kim Ye-lim	Grand Prix de France	NHK Trophy
South Korea	Lee Hae-in	Skate America	Grand Prix de France
South Korea	You Young	Skate Canada International	MK John Wilson Trophy
United States	Starr Andrews	Skate Canada International	NHK Trophy
United States	Amber Glenn	Skate America	NHK Trophy
United States	Isabeau Levito	Skate America	MK John Wilson Trophy
United States	Audrey Shin	Grand Prix de France	NHK Trophy
United States	Bradie Tennell	MK John Wilson Trophy	Grand Prix of Espoo
United States	Lindsay Thorngren	Skate Canada International	Grand Prix of Espoo
Cyprus	Marilena Kitromilis	Skate America	
Finland	Linnea Ceder	Grand Prix of Espoo	
Finland	Janna Jyrkinen	Grand Prix of Espoo	
Finland	Jenni Saarinen	Grand Prix of Espoo	
France	Maé-Bérénice Méité	Grand Prix de France	
France	Maïa Mazzara	Grand Prix de France	
France	Léa Serna	Grand Prix de France	
Great Britain	Natasha McKay	MK John Wilson Trophy	
Japan	Yuhana Yokoi	Skate Canada International	
Romania	Julia Sauter	MK John Wilson Trophy	
South Korea	Ji Seo-yeon	NHK Trophy	
South Korea	Park Yeon-jeong	Skate America	
South Korea	Wi Seo-yeong	NHK Trophy	
South Korea	Yun Ah-sun	Skate America	
Switzerland	Alexia Paganini	MK John Wilson Trophy	
United States	Gracie Gold	Skate America	
United States	Gabriella Izzo	MK John Wilson Trophy	
United States	Ava Marie Ziegler	Skate Canada International	

=== Pairs ===
Nation	Team	Assignment(s)	
Canada	Kelly Ann Laurin / Loucas Éthier	Skate America	Skate Canada International
Canada	Brooke McIntosh / Benjamin Mimar	Skate Canada International	NHK Trophy
Canada	Deanna Stellato-Dudek / Maxime Deschamps	Skate America	Grand Prix de France
France	Camille Kovalev / Pavel Kovalev	Grand Prix de France	NHK Trophy
Georgia	Anastasiia Metelkina / Daniil Parkman	MK John Wilson Trophy	Grand Prix of Espoo
Germany	Alisa Efimova / Ruben Blommaert	Skate Canada International	Grand Prix of Espoo
Germany	Letizia Roscher / Luis Schuster	Skate America	MK John Wilson Trophy
Italy	Irma Caldara / Riccardo Maglio	MK John Wilson Trophy	NHK Trophy
Italy	Sara Conti / Niccolò Macii	Skate Canada International	MK John Wilson Trophy
Italy	Rebecca Ghilardi / Filippo Ambrosini	Grand Prix de France	Grand Prix of Espoo
Italy	Anna Valesi / Manuel Piazza	Skate America	Grand Prix of Espoo
Japan	Riku Miura / Ryuichi Kihara	Skate Canada International	NHK Trophy
Netherlands	Daria Danilova / Michel Tsiba	NHK Trophy	Grand Prix of Espoo
Sweden	Greta Crafoord / John Crafoord	Skate America	Grand Prix of Espoo
United States	Emily Chan / Spencer Akira Howe	Skate Canada International	NHK Trophy
United States	Alexa Knierim / Brandon Frazier	Skate America	MK John Wilson Trophy
United States	Maria Mokhova / Ivan Mokhov	Skate America	Grand Prix de France
United States	Valentina Plazas / Maximiliano Fernandez	Skate America	Skate Canada International
Czech Republic	Jelizaveta Žuková / Martin Bidař	Skate Canada International	
France	Océane Piegad / Denys Strekalin	Grand Prix de France	
Great Britain	Anastasia Vaipan-Law / Luke Digby	MK John Wilson Trophy	
Georgia	Karina Safina / Luka Berulava	Grand Prix de France	
Germany	Annika Hocke / Robert Kunkel	Grand Prix de France	
Netherlands	Nika Osipova / Dmitry Epstein	Grand Prix of Espoo	
United States	Katie McBeath / Nathan Bartholomay	MK John Wilson Trophy	
United States	Anastasiia Smirnova / Danylo Siianytsia	Grand Prix of Espoo	

=== Ice dance ===
Nation	Team	Assignment(s)	
Australia	Holly Harris / Jason Chan	Skate America	Skate Canada International
Canada	Laurence Fournier Beaudry / Nikolaj Sørensen	Grand Prix de France	NHK Trophy
Canada	Piper Gilles / Paul Poirier	Skate Canada International	Grand Prix of Espoo
Canada	Marjorie Lajoie / Zachary Lagha	Skate Canada International	MK John Wilson Trophy
Canada	Marie-Jade Lauriault / Romain Le Gac	Skate America	Skate Canada International
Canada	Carolane Soucisse / Shane Firus	Skate America	Grand Prix of Espoo
China	Wang Shiyue / Liu Xinyu	NHK Trophy	Grand Prix of Espoo
Czech Republic	Natálie Taschlerová / Filip Taschler	MK John Wilson Trophy	Grand Prix of Espoo
Finland	Yuka Orihara / Juho Pirinen	NHK Trophy	Grand Prix of Espoo
Finland	Juulia Turkkila / Matthias Versluis	Grand Prix de France	Grand Prix of Espoo
France	Loïcia Demougeot / Théo le Mercier	Skate America	Grand Prix de France
France	Evgeniia Lopareva / Geoffrey Brissaud	Grand Prix de France	NHK Trophy
Georgia	Maria Kazakova / Georgy Reviya	Grand Prix de France	MK John Wilson Trophy
Great Britain	Lilah Fear / Lewis Gibson	Skate Canada International	MK John Wilson Trophy
Italy	Charlène Guignard / Marco Fabbri	Grand Prix de France	MK John Wilson Trophy
Japan	Misato Komatsubara / Tim Koleto	Skate Canada International	NHK Trophy
Japan	Kana Muramoto / Daisuke Takahashi	Skate America	NHK Trophy
Ukraine	Mariia Holubtsova / Kyryl Bielobrov	Skate America	MK John Wilson Trophy
United States	Christina Carreira / Anthony Ponomarenko	MK John Wilson Trophy	Grand Prix of Espoo
United States	Madison Chock / Evan Bates	Skate America	NHK Trophy
United States	Oona Brown / Gage Brown	MK John Wilson Trophy	Grand Prix of Espoo
United States	Caroline Green / Michael Parsons	Skate Canada International	NHK Trophy
United States	Kaitlin Hawayek / Jean-Luc Baker	Skate America	Grand Prix of Espoo
United States	Katarina Wolfkostin / Jeffrey Chen	Grand Prix de France	NHK Trophy
Canada	Alicia Fabbri / Paul Ayer	MK John Wilson Trophy	
Canada	Molly Lanaghan / Dmitre Razgulajevs	Grand Prix de France	
Canada	Haley Sales / Nikolas Wamsteeker	MK John Wilson Trophy	
France	Marie Dupayage / Thomas Nabais	Grand Prix de France	
France	Natacha Lagouge / Arnaud Caffa	Grand Prix of Espoo	
Germany	Jennifer Janse van Rensburg / Benjamin Steffan	Skate America	
Israel	Mariia Nosovitskaya / Mikhail Nosovitskiy	Skate Canada International	
Lithuania	Allison Reed / Saulius Ambrulevičius	NHK Trophy	
United States	Emily Bratti / Ian Somerville	Skate Canada International	
United States	Molly Cesanek / Yehor Yehorov	Skate Canada International	
United States	Lorraine McNamara / Anton Spiridonov	Skate America	
United States	Eva Pate / Logan Bye	Grand Prix de France	

=== Changes to preliminary assignments ===
==== Skate America ====
Discipline	Withdrew		Added		Notes	Ref.
Discipline	Date	Skater(s)	Date	Skater(s)	Notes	Ref.
Men	July 26	(Australia) Brendan Kerry	September 1	(Japan) Kao Miura		
Pairs	August 1	(Australia) Anastasia Golubeva / Hektor Giotopoulos Moore	September 21	(Canada) Kelly Ann Laurin / Loucas Éthier	Remained in Juniors	
Ice dance	August 12	(Ukraine) Oleksandra Nazarova / Maxim Nikitin	August 23	(Ukraine) Mariia Holubtsova / Kyryl Bielobrov	Nazarova & Nikitin retired.	
Ice dance	—N/a		August 16	(United States) Lorraine McNamara / Anton Spiridonov	Host pick	
Pairs	August 26	(Ukraine) Sofiia Holichenko / Artem Darenskyi	September 9	(Germany) Letizia Roscher / Luis Schuster	Visa issues	
Women	—N/a		August 31	(United States) Gracie Gold	Host pick	
Ice dance	September 1	(Lithuania) Allison Reed / Saulius Ambrulevičius	September 8	(Australia) Holly Harris / Jason Chan		
Men	—N/a		September 8	(United States) Eric Sjoberg	Host picks	
Pairs	—N/a		September 21	(United States) Valentina Plazas / Maximiliano Fernandez	Host picks	
Pairs	October 7	(Netherlands) Daria Danilova / Michel Tsiba	October 10	(Italy) Anna Valesi / Manuel Piazza	Visa issues	
Women	October 11	(China) Zhu Yi	October 13	(Czech Republic) Eliška Březinová	Injury	
Men	October 14	(Japan) Yuma Kagiyama	October 14	(Japan) Koshiro Shimada	Injury	
Men	October 17	(United States) Eric Sjoberg	October 17	(United States) Dinh Tran		
Pairs	October 18	(United States) Anastasiia Smirnova / Danylo Siianytsia	October 18	(United States) Maria Mokhova / Ivan Mokhov		

==== Skate Canada International ====
Discipline	Withdrew		Added		Notes	Ref.
Discipline	Date	Skater(s)	Date	Skater(s)	Notes	Ref.
Pairs	August 5	(Canada) Evelyn Walsh / Trennt Michaud	October 3	(Germany) Alisa Efimova / Ruben Blommaert	Walsh retired.	
Women	August 23	(South Korea) Lim Eun-soo	August 30	(Belgium) Nina Pinzarrone		
Women	August 31	(Azerbaijan) Ekaterina Ryabova	September 1	(United States) Starr Andrews	Ryabova retired.	
Women	September 6	(Belgium) Nina Pinzarrone	September 14	(Netherlands) Lindsay van Zundert	Injury	
Pairs	—N/a		September 16	(Canada) Kelly Ann Laurin / Loucas Éthier	Host picks	
Women	September 29	(Canada) Alison Schumacher	September 30	(United States) Kate Wang		
Women	October 5	(Japan) Wakaba Higuchi	October 11	(Japan) Rinka Watanabe	Injury	
Pairs	October 18	(United States) Katie McBeath / Nathan Bartholomay	October 20	(United States) Valentina Plazas / Maximiliano Fernandez		
Women	October 24	(United States) Kate Wang	October 24	(United States) Ava Marie Ziegler		
Ice dance	October 24	(Canada) Miku Makita / Tyler Gunara	October 24	(Canada) Marie-Jade Lauriault / Romain Le Gac	Injury	
Men	October 27	(China) Jin Boyang	—N/a		Recovery from surgery	

==== Grand Prix de France ====
Discipline	Withdrew		Added		Notes	Ref.
Discipline	Date	Skater(s)	Date	Skater(s)	Notes	Ref.
Ice dance	August 12	(Ukraine) Oleksandra Nazarova / Maxim Nikitin	August 19	(Georgia (country)) Maria Kazakova / Georgy Reviya	Nazarova & Nikitin retired.	
Men	—N/a		September 15	(France) Luc Economides	Host picks	
Women	—N/a		September 15	(France) Maé-Bérénice Méité	Host picks	
Pairs	—N/a		September 15	(France) Aurelie Faula / Theo Belle	Host picks	
Ice dance	—N/a		September 15	(France) Marie Dupayage / Thomas Nabais	Host picks	
Men	October 7	(Czech Republic) Georgii Reshtenko	October 11	(Georgia (country)) Nika Egadze		
Men	October 14	(Japan) Yuma Kagiyama	October 14	(Japan) Sena Miyake	Injury	
Pairs	October 18	(France) Aurelie Faula / Theo Belle	October 21	(United States) Maria Mokhova / Ivan Mokhov		
Men	October 24	(Kazakhstan) Mikhail Shaidorov	October 25	(Switzerland) Lukas Britschgi		
Pairs	October 26	(China) Peng Cheng / Jin Yang	—N/a		Injury (Jin)	
Men	October 28	(France) Kévin Aymoz	October 28	(France) Landry Le May	Injury	

==== MK John Wilson Trophy ====
Discipline	Withdrew		Added		Notes	Ref.
Discipline	Date	Skater(s)	Date	Skater(s)	Notes	Ref.
Pairs	August 5	(Canada) Evelyn Walsh / Trennt Michaud	August 19	(Italy) Irma Caldara / Riccardo Maglio	Walsh retired.	
Men	—N/a		August 16	(United Kingdom) Edward Appleby	Host pick	
Men	August 31	(Azerbaijan) Vladimir Litvintsev	September 8	(United States) Tomoki Hiwatashi		
Women	September 6	(Belgium) Nina Pinzarrone	September 20	(Canada) Gabrielle Daleman	Injury	
Pairs	November 5	(Canada) Lori-Ann Matte / Thierry Ferland	—N/a		Injury	

==== NHK Trophy ====
Discipline	Withdrew		Added		Notes	Ref.
Discipline	Date	Skater(s)	Date	Skater(s)	Notes	Ref.
Men	—N/a		September 1	(Japan) Sōta Yamamoto	Host picks	
Women	—N/a		September 1	(Japan) Rion Sumiyoshi	Host picks	
Ice dance	—N/a		September 1	(Japan) Misato Komatsubara / Tim Koleto	Host picks	
Women	September 6	(Azerbaijan) Ekaterina Ryabova	September 22	(Estonia) Eva-Lotta Kiibus	Ryabova retired.	
Pairs	October 4	(Australia) Maria Chernyshova / Harley Windsor	October 14	(Netherlands) Daria Danilova / Michel Tsiba	Injury (Windsor)	
Women	October 5	(Japan) Wakaba Higuchi	October 6	(Japan) Rinka Watanabe	Injury	
Men	October 27	(China) Jin Boyang	October 27	(Canada) Conrad Orzel	Recovery from surgery	
Pairs	November 11	(Czech Republic) Jelizaveta Žuková / Martin Bidař	—N/a			
Pairs	November 15	(Germany) Annika Hocke / Robert Kunkel	—N/a		Positive COVID-19 test (Hocke)	

==== Grand Prix of Espoo ====
Discipline	Withdrew		Added		Notes	Ref.
Discipline	Date	Skater(s)	Date	Skater(s)	Notes	Ref.
Pairs	August 5	(Australia) Anastasia Golubeva / Hektor Giotopoulos Moore	August 29	(Ukraine) Sofiia Holichenko / Artem Darenskyi	Remained in Juniors	
Pairs	October 26	(China) Peng Cheng / Jin Yang	October 27	(Germany) Alisa Efimova / Ruben Blommaert	Injury (Jin)	
Pairs	October 26	(Ukraine) Sofiia Holichenko / Artem Darenskyi	October 27	(Italy) Anna Valesi / Manuel Piazza	Injury (Holichenko)	
Pairs	November 8	(Canada) Lori-Ann Matte / Thierry Ferland	November 11	(Netherlands) Nika Osipova / Dmitry Epstein	Injury	
Pairs	November 11	(Georgia (country)) Karina Safina / Luka Berulava	November 14	(Sweden) Greta Crafoord / John Crafoord	Injury (Safina)	
Men	November 16	(Kazakhstan) Mikhail Shaidorov	November 17	(Estonia) Aleksandr Selevko		
Women	November 23	(Finland) Emmi Peltonen	November 23	(Finland) Janna Jyrkinen	COVID-19	

== Medal summary ==
Event	Discipline	Gold	Silver	Bronze
(United States) Skate America	Men	(United States) Ilia Malinin	(Japan) Kao Miura	(South Korea) Cha Jun-hwan
(United States) Skate America	Women	(Japan) Kaori Sakamoto	(United States) Isabeau Levito	(United States) Amber Glenn
(United States) Skate America	Pairs	(United States) Alexa Knierim / Brandon Frazier	(Canada) Deanna Stellato-Dudek / Maxime Deschamps	(Canada) Kelly Ann Laurin / Loucas Éthier
(United States) Skate America	Ice dance	(United States) Madison Chock / Evan Bates	(United States) Kaitlin Hawayek / Jean-Luc Baker	(Canada) Marie-Jade Lauriault / Romain Le Gac

Event	Discipline	Gold	Silver	Bronze
Skate Canada International	Men	(Japan) Shoma Uno	(Japan) Kao Miura	(Italy) Matteo Rizzo
Skate Canada International	Women	(Japan) Rinka Watanabe	(United States) Starr Andrews	(South Korea) You Young
Skate Canada International	Pairs	(Japan) Riku Miura / Ryuichi Kihara	(United States) Emily Chan / Spencer Akira Howe	(Italy) Sara Conti / Niccolò Macii
Skate Canada International	Ice dance	(Canada) Piper Gilles / Paul Poirier	(United Kingdom) Lilah Fear / Lewis Gibson	(Canada) Marjorie Lajoie / Zachary Lagha

Event	Discipline	Gold	Silver	Bronze
Grand Prix de France	Men	(France) Adam Siao Him Fa	(Japan) Sōta Yamamoto	(Japan) Kazuki Tomono
Grand Prix de France	Women	(Belgium) Loena Hendrickx	(South Korea) Kim Ye-lim	(Japan) Rion Sumiyoshi
Grand Prix de France	Pairs	(Canada) Deanna Stellato-Dudek / Maxime Deschamps	(France) Camille Kovalev / Pavel Kovalev	(Germany) Annika Hocke / Robert Kunkel
Grand Prix de France	Ice dance	(Italy) Charlène Guignard / Marco Fabbri	(Canada) Laurence Fournier Beaudry / Nikolaj Sørensen	(France) Evgeniia Lopareva / Geoffrey Brissaud

Event	Discipline	Gold	Silver	Bronze
(United Kingdom) MK John Wilson Trophy	Men	(Italy) Daniel Grassl	(Latvia) Deniss Vasiļjevs	(Japan) Shun Sato
(United Kingdom) MK John Wilson Trophy	Women	(Japan) Mai Mihara	(United States) Isabeau Levito	(Georgia (country)) Anastasiia Gubanova
(United Kingdom) MK John Wilson Trophy	Pairs	(United States) Alexa Knierim / Brandon Frazier	(Italy) Sara Conti / Niccolò Macii	(Germany) Letizia Roscher / Luis Schuster
(United Kingdom) MK John Wilson Trophy	Ice dance	(Italy) Charlène Guignard / Marco Fabbri	(United Kingdom) Lilah Fear / Lewis Gibson	(Canada) Marjorie Lajoie / Zachary Lagha

Event	Discipline	Gold	Silver	Bronze
(Japan) NHK Trophy	Men	(Japan) Shoma Uno	(Japan) Sōta Yamamoto	(South Korea) Cha Jun-hwan
(Japan) NHK Trophy	Women	(South Korea) Kim Ye-lim	(Japan) Kaori Sakamoto	(Japan) Rion Sumiyoshi
(Japan) NHK Trophy	Pairs	(Japan) Riku Miura / Ryuichi Kihara	(United States) Emily Chan / Spencer Akira Howe	(Canada) Brooke McIntosh / Benjamin Mimar
(Japan) NHK Trophy	Ice dance	(Canada) Laurence Fournier Beaudry / Nikolaj Sørensen	(United States) Madison Chock / Evan Bates	(United States) Caroline Green / Michael Parsons

Event	Discipline	Gold	Silver	Bronze
(Finland) Grand Prix of Espoo	Men	(United States) Ilia Malinin	(Japan) Shun Sato	(France) Kévin Aymoz
(Finland) Grand Prix of Espoo	Women	(Japan) Mai Mihara	(Belgium) Loena Hendrickx	(Japan) Mana Kawabe
(Finland) Grand Prix of Espoo	Pairs	(Italy) Rebecca Ghilardi / Filippo Ambrosini	(Germany) Alisa Efimova / Ruben Blommaert	(Georgia (country)) Anastasiia Metelkina / Daniil Parkman
(Finland) Grand Prix of Espoo	Ice dance	(Canada) Piper Gilles / Paul Poirier	(United States) Kaitlin Hawayek / Jean-Luc Baker	(Finland) Juulia Turkkila / Matthias Versluis

Event	Discipline	Gold	Silver	Bronze
(Italy) Grand Prix Final	Men	(Japan) Shoma Uno	(Japan) Sōta Yamamoto	(United States) Ilia Malinin
(Italy) Grand Prix Final	Women	(Japan) Mai Mihara	(United States) Isabeau Levito	(Belgium) Loena Hendrickx
(Italy) Grand Prix Final	Pairs	(Japan) Riku Miura / Ryuichi Kihara	(United States) Alexa Knierim / Brandon Frazier	(Italy) Sara Conti / Niccolò Macii
(Italy) Grand Prix Final	Ice dance	(Canada) Piper Gilles / Paul Poirier	(United States) Madison Chock / Evan Bates	(Italy) Charlene Guignard / Marco Fabbri

=== Medal standings ===
Rank	Nation	Gold	Silver	Bronze	Total
1	Japan	11	7	5	23
2	United States	5	11	3	19
3	Canada	5	2	5	12
4	Italy	4	1	4	9
5	South Korea	1	1	3	5
6	France	1	1	2	4
7	Belgium	1	1	1	3
8	Great Britain	0	2	0	2
9	Germany	0	1	2	3
10	Latvia	0	1	0	1
11	Georgia	0	0	2	2
12	Finland	0	0	1	1
Totals (12 entries)		28	28	28	84

== Qualification ==
At each event, skaters earned points toward qualification for the Grand Prix Final. Following the sixth event, the top six highest-scoring skaters/teams advanced to the Final. The points earned per placement were as follows:

Placement	Singles	Pairs/Ice dance
1st	15	15
2nd	13	13
3rd	11	11
4th	9	9
5th	7	7
6th	5	5
7th	4	—N/a
8th	3	—N/a

There were originally seven tie-breakers in cases of a tie in overall points:

1. Highest placement at an event. If a skater placed 1st and 3rd, the tiebreaker is the 1st place, and that beats a skater who placed 2nd in both events.
2. Highest combined total scores in both events. If a skater earned 200 points at one event and 250 at a second, that skater would win in the second tie-break over a skater who earned 200 points at one event and 150 at another.
3. Participated in two events.
4. Highest combined scores in the free skating/free dance portion of both events.
5. Highest individual score in the free skating/free dance portion from one event.
6. Highest combined scores in the short program/short dance of both events.
7. Highest number of total participants at the events.

If a tie remained, it was considered unbreakable and the tied skaters all advanced to the Grand Prix Final.

=== Qualification standings ===
Pts.	Men	Women	Pairs	Ice dance
30	(United States) Ilia Malinin (Japan) Shoma Uno	(Japan) Mai Mihara	(Japan) Riku Miura / Ryuichi Kihara (United States) Alexa Knierim / Brandon Frazier	(Canada) Piper Gilles / Paul Poirier (Italy) Charlène Guignard / Marco Fabbri
28	—N/a	(Belgium) Loena Hendrickx (Japan) Kaori Sakamoto (South Korea) Kim Ye-lim	(Canada) Deanna Stellato-Dudek / Maxime Deschamps	(Canada) Laurence Fournier Beaudry / Nikolaj Sørensen (United States) Madison Chock / Evan Bates
26	(Japan) Kao Miura (Japan) Sōta Yamamoto	(United States) Isabeau Levito	(United States) Emily Chan / Spencer Akira Howe	(United Kingdom) Lilah Fear / Lewis Gibson (United States) Kaitlin Hawayek / Jean-Luc Baker
24	(Italy) Daniel Grassl (Japan) Shun Sato	—N/a	(Italy) Rebecca Ghilardi / Filippo Ambrosini (Italy) Sara Conti / Niccolò Macii	—N/a
22	(France) Adam Siao Him Fa (South Korea) Cha Jun-hwan	(Japan) Rinka Watanabe (Japan) Rion Sumiyoshi	—N/a	(Canada) Marjorie Lajoie / Zachary Lagha
20	(Japan) Kazuki Tomono	(South Korea) You Young	(France) Camille Kovalev / Pavel Kovalev (Canada) Brooke McIntosh / Benjamin Mimar (Georgia (country)) Anastasiia Metelkina / Daniil Parkman	(United States) Caroline Green / Michael Parsons
18	—N/a	(South Korea) Lee Hae-in	—N/a	(France) Evgeniia Lopareva / Geoffrey Brissaud (Canada) Marie-Jade Lauriault / Romain Le Gac (United States) Christina Carreira / Anthony Ponomarenko (France) Loïcia Demougeot / Théo Le Mercier
16	(Italy) Matteo Rizzo (Japan) Tatsuya Tsuboi	(Japan) Mana Kawabe (Japan) Rika Kihira (United States) Audrey Shin	(Italy) Irma Caldara / Riccardo Maglio	—N/a
15	—N/a	(Georgia (country)) Anastasiia Gubanova	—N/a	—N/a
14	(United States) Camden Pulkinen	(Poland) Ekaterina Kurakova	(United States) Maria Mokhova / Ivan Mokhov	(Czech Republic) Natálie Taschlerová / Filip Taschler
13	(Latvia) Deniss Vasiļjevs	(United States) Starr Andrews	(Germany) Alisa Efimova / Ruben Blommaert	—N/a
12	(Canada) Keegan Messing (Canada) Roman Sadovsky	—N/a	(United States) Valentina Plazas / Maximiliano Fernandez (Netherlands) Daria Danilova / Michel Tsiba	—N/a
11	(France) Kévin Aymoz (Georgia (country)) Nika Egadze	(United States) Amber Glenn (Canada) Madeline Schizas	(Canada) Kelly Ann Laurin / Loucas Éthier (Germany) Letizia Roscher / Luis Schuster (Germany) Annika Hocke / Robert Kunkel	(Finland) Juulia Turkkila / Matthias Versluis
10	—N/a			(Georgia (country)) Maria Kazakova / Georgy Reviya (Japan) Kana Muramoto / Daisuke Takahashi
9	(Japan) Koshiro Shimada (South Korea) Lee Si-hyeong (Switzerland) Lukas Britschgi	(United States) Ava Marie Ziegler (Estonia) Niina Petrõkina (Germany) Nicole Schott	(United States) Anastasiia Smirnova / Danylo Siianytsia	(Lithuania) Allison Reed / Saulius Ambrulevičius
7	(Canada) Stephen Gogolev	—N/a	(Italy) Anna Valesi / Manuel Piazza (Georgia (country)) Karina Safina / Luka Berulava	(Australia) Holly Harris / Jason Chan (United States) Eva Pate / Logan Bye
5	(Canada) Wesley Chiu (France) Luc Economides (Sweden) Nikolaj Majorov	(United States) Lindsay Thorngren (South Korea) Ji Seo-yeon (United States) Gracie Gold	(Czech Republic) Jelizaveta Žuková / Martin Bidař (United States) Katie McBeath / Nathan Bartholomay (Netherlands) Nika Osipova / Dmitry Epstein	(Canada) Carolane Soucisse / Shane Firus (United States) Emily Bratti / Ian Somerville
4	(United States) Jimmy Ma (United States) Liam Kapeikis (Estonia) Arlet Levandi	(Japan) Rino Matsuike (United States) Gabriella Izzo	—N/a	
3	(Estonia) Aleksandr Selevko (Georgia (country)) Morisi Kvitelashvili (Ukraine) Ivan Shmuratko (Japan) Sena Miyake	(Canada) Gabrielle Daleman (United States) Bradie Tennell (Japan) Yuhana Yokoi (South Korea) Wi Seo-yeong (France) Maé-Bérénice Méité (South Korea) Park Yeon-jeong	—N/a	

=== Qualifiers ===
No.	Men	Women	Pairs	Ice dance
1	(United States) Ilia Malinin	(Japan) Mai Mihara	(Japan) Riku Miura / Ryuichi Kihara	(Canada) Piper Gilles / Paul Poirier
2	(Japan) Shoma Uno	(Belgium) Loena Hendrickx	(United States) Alexa Knierim / Brandon Frazier	(Italy) Charlène Guignard / Marco Fabbri
3	(Japan) Kao Miura	(Japan) Kaori Sakamoto	(Canada) Deanna Stellato-Dudek / Maxime Deschamps	(Canada) Laurence Fournier Beaudry / Nikolaj Sørensen
4	(Japan) Sōta Yamamoto	(South Korea) Kim Ye-lim	(United States) Emily Chan / Spencer Akira Howe	(United States) Madison Chock / Evan Bates
5	(Italy) Daniel Grassl	(United States) Isabeau Levito	(Italy) Rebecca Ghilardi / Filippo Ambrosini	(United Kingdom) Lilah Fear / Lewis Gibson
6	(Japan) Shun Sato	(Japan) Rinka Watanabe	(Italy) Sara Conti / Niccolò Macii	(United States) Kaitlin Hawayek / Jean-Luc Baker

Alternates

No.	Men	Women	Pairs	Ice dance
1	(France) Adam Siao Him Fa	(Japan) Rion Sumiyoshi	(France) Camille Kovalev / Pavel Kovalev	(Canada) Marjorie Lajoie / Zachary Lagha
2	(South Korea) Cha Jun-hwan	(South Korea) You Young	(Canada) Brooke McIntosh / Benjamin Mimar	(United States) Caroline Green / Michael Parsons
3	(Japan) Kazuki Tomono	(South Korea) Lee Hae-in	(Georgia (country)) Anastasiia Metelkina / Daniil Parkman	(France) Evgeniia Lopareva / Geoffrey Brissaud

== Records and achievements ==
=== Achievements ===
- At the 2022 Skate Canada, Riku Miura and Ryuichi Kihara became the first Japanese pairs team to win a Grand Prix gold medal.
- At the 2022 Grand Prix de France, Loena Hendrickx won Belgium's first Grand Prix gold medal at the senior level in any discipline.
- At the 2022 Grand Prix de France, Deanna Stellato-Dudek was the oldest skater (at age 39) to win a Grand Prix gold medal in any discipline.
- At the 2022 MK John Wilson Trophy, Daniel Grassl became the first Italian men's singles skater to win a Grand Prix gold medal.
- At the 2022 MK John Wilson Trophy, Deniss Vasiļjevs won Latvia's first Grand Prix medal in men's singles (a silver medal).
- At the 2022 MK John Wilson Trophy, Anastasiia Gubanova won Georgia's first Grand Prix medal in women's singles (a bronze medal).
- At the 2022 Grand Prix of Espoo, Anastasiia Metelkina and Daniil Parkman won Georgia's first Grand Prix medal in pairs (a bronze medal) .
- At the 2022 Grand Prix of Espoo, Juulia Turkkila and Matthias Versluis won Finland's first Grand Prix medal in ice dance (a bronze medal) at either the senior or junior level.
- Riku Miura and Ryuichi Kihara became the first Japanese pairs team to win a gold medal at a Grand Prix Final.
- Alexa Knierim and Brandon Frazier won the United States' first Grand Prix Final medal in pairs (the silver medal).
- Sara Conti and Niccolò Macii won Italy's first Grand Prix Final medal in pairs (the bronze medal) at either the senior or junior level.
- Loena Hendrickx won Belgium's first Grand Prix Final medal (the bronze medal) at the senior level in any discipline.

== Top scores ==
=== Men's singles ===
Top 10 best scores in the men's combined total
No.	Skater	Nation	Score	Event
1	Shoma Uno	Japan	304.46	2022–23 Grand Prix Final
2	Ilia Malinin	United States	280.37	2022 Skate America
3	Sōta Yamamoto	Japan	274.35	2022–23 Grand Prix Final
4	Kao Miura	Japan	273.19	2022 Skate America
5	Adam Siao Him Fa	France	268.98	2022 Grand Prix de France
6	Daniel Grassl	Italy	264.35	2022 MK John Wilson Trophy
7	Cha Jun-hwan	South Korea	264.05	2022 Skate America
8	Shun Sato	Japan	262.21	2022 Grand Prix of Espoo
9	Kévin Aymoz	France	255.69	2022 Grand Prix of Espoo
10	Deniss Vasiļjevs	Latvia	254.56	2022 MK John Wilson Trophy

Top 10 best scores in the men's short program
No.	Skater	Nation	Score	Event
1	Shoma Uno	Japan	99.99	2022–23 Grand Prix Final
2	Sōta Yamamoto	Japan	96.49	2022 NHK Trophy
3	Kao Miura	Japan	94.96	2022 Skate America
4	Cha Jun-hwan	South Korea	94.44	2022 Skate America
5	Roman Sadovsky	Canada	89.49	2022 MK John Wilson Trophy
6	Kazuki Tomono	Japan	89.46	2022 Grand Prix de France
7	Kévin Aymoz	France	88.96	2022 Grand Prix of Espoo
8	Daniel Grassl	Italy	88.43	2022 Skate America
9	Adam Siao Him Fa	France	88.00	2022 Grand Prix de France
10	Ilia Malinin	United States	86.08	2022 Skate America

Top 10 best scores in the men's free skating
No.	Skater	Nation	Score	Event
1	Shoma Uno	Japan	204.47	2022–23 Grand Prix Final
2	Ilia Malinin	United States	194.29	2022 Skate America
3	Adam Siao Him Fa	France	180.98	2022 Grand Prix de France
4	Shun Sato	Japan	180.62	2022 Grand Prix of Espoo
5	Sōta Yamamoto	Japan	179.49	2022–23 Grand Prix Final
6	Kao Miura	Japan	178.23	2022 Skate America
7	Daniel Grassl	Italy	177.50	2022 MK John Wilson Trophy
8	Cha Jun-hwan	South Korea	174.41	2022 NHK Trophy
9	Deniss Vasiļjevs	Latvia	171.55	2022 MK John Wilson Trophy
10	Keegan Messing	Canada	171.03	2022 Skate Canada International

=== Women's singles ===
Top 10 best scores in the women's combined total
No.	Skater	Nation	Score	Event
1	Kaori Sakamoto	Japan	217.61	2022 Skate America
2	Mai Mihara	Japan	217.43	2022 MK John Wilson Trophy
3	Loena Hendrickx	Belgium	216.34	2022 Grand Prix de France
4	Isabeau Levito	United States	215.74	2022 MK John Wilson Trophy
5	Kim Ye-lim	South Korea	204.49	2022 NHK Trophy
6	Amber Glenn	United States	197.61	2022 Skate America
7	Rinka Watanabe	Japan	197.59	2022 Skate Canada International
8	Mana Kawabe	Japan	197.41	2022 Grand Prix of Espoo
9	Rion Sumiyoshi	Japan	194.34	2022 Grand Prix de France
10	Lee Hae-in	South Korea	193.49	2022 Grand Prix de France

Top 10 best scores in the women's short program
No.	Skater	Nation	Score	Event
1	Kaori Sakamoto	Japan	75.86	2022–23 Grand Prix Final
2	Loena Hendrickx	Belgium	74.88	2022 Grand Prix of Espoo
3	Mai Mihara	Japan	74.58	2022–23 Grand Prix Final
4	Rinka Watanabe	Japan	72.58	2022–23 Grand Prix Final
5	Kim Ye-lim	South Korea	72.22	2022 NHK Trophy
6	Isabeau Levito	United States	72.06	2022 MK John Wilson Trophy
7	Mana Kawabe	Japan	68.83	2022 Grand Prix de France
8	Amber Glenn	United States	68.42	2022 Skate America
9	Rion Sumiyoshi	Japan	68.01	2022 NHK Trophy
10	Madeline Schizas	Canada	67.90	2022 Skate Canada International

Top 10 best scores in the women's free skating
No.	Skater	Nation	Score	Event
1	Kaori Sakamoto	Japan	145.89	2022 Skate America
2	Mai Mihara	Japan	145.20	2022 MK John Wilson Trophy
3	Isabeau Levito	United States	143.68	2022 MK John Wilson Trophy
4	Loena Hendrickx	Belgium	143.59	2022 Grand Prix de France
5	Rinka Watanabe	Japan	134.32	2022 Skate Canada International
6	Kim Ye-lim	South Korea	132.27	2022 NHK Trophy
7	Lee Hae-in	South Korea	130.72	2022 Grand Prix de France
8	Mana Kawabe	Japan	130.38	2022 Grand Prix of Espoo
9	Rion Sumiyoshi	Japan	130.24	2022 Grand Prix de France
10	You Young	South Korea	130.15	2022 MK John Wilson Trophy

=== Pairs ===
Top 10 best scores in the pairs' combined total
No.	Team	Nation	Score	Event
1	Riku Miura / Ryuichi Kihara	Japan	216.16	2022 NHK Trophy
2	Alexa Knierim / Brandon Frazier	United States	213.28	2022–23 Grand Prix Final
3	Deanna Stellato-Dudek / Maxime Deschamps	Canada	197.89	2022 Skate America
4	Rebecca Ghilardi / Filippo Ambrosini	Italy	189.74	2022 Grand Prix of Espoo
5	Emily Chan / Spencer Akira Howe	United States	187.49	2022 NHK Trophy
6	Sara Conti / Niccolò Macii	Italy	187.02	2022–23 Grand Prix Final
7	Camille Kovalev / Pavel Kovalev	France	179.85	2022 Grand Prix de France
8	Annika Hocke / Robert Kunkel	Germany	179.73	2022 Grand Prix de France
9	Brooke McIntosh / Benjamin Mimar	Canada	175.65	2022 NHK Trophy
10	Alisa Efimova / Ruben Blommaert	Germany	170.75	2022 Grand Prix of Espoo

Top 10 best scores in the pairs' short program
No.	Team	Nation	Score	Event
1	Riku Miura / Ryuichi Kihara	Japan	78.25	2022 NHK Trophy
2	Alexa Knierim / Brandon Frazier	United States	77.65	2022–23 Grand Prix Final
3	Deanna Stellato-Dudek / Maxime Deschamps	Canada	73.05	2022 Skate America
4	Sara Conti / Niccolò Macii	Italy	68.69	2022 MK John Wilson Trophy
5	Emily Chan / Spencer Akira Howe	United States	67.39	2022 Skate Canada International
6	Rebecca Ghilardi / Filippo Ambrosini	Italy	67.31	2022 Grand Prix of Espoo
7	Camille Kovalev / Pavel Kovalev	France	63.98	2022 Grand Prix de France
8	Anastasiia Smirnova / Danylo Siianytsia	United States	63.01	2022 Grand Prix of Espoo
9	Anastasiia Metelkina / Daniil Parkman	Georgia	62.59	2022 Grand Prix of Espoo
10	Alisa Efimova / Ruben Blommaert	Germany	62.46	2022 Grand Prix of Espoo

Top 10 best scores in the pairs' free skating
No.	Team	Nation	Score	Event
1	Riku Miura / Ryuichi Kihara	Japan	138.63	2022 Skate Canada International
2	Alexa Knierim / Brandon Frazier	United States	135.63	2022–23 Grand Prix Final
3	Deanna Stellato-Dudek / Maxime Deschamps	Canada	124.84	2022 Skate America
4	Emily Chan / Spencer Akira Howe	United States	122.87	2022 NHK Trophy
5	Rebecca Ghilardi / Filippo Ambrosini	Italy	122.43	2022 Grand Prix of Espoo
6	Sara Conti / Niccolò Macii	Italy	119.72	2022–23 Grand Prix Final
7	Annika Hocke / Robert Kunkel	Germany	119.62	2022 Grand Prix de France
8	Camille Kovalev / Pavel Kovalev	France	115.87	2022 Grand Prix de France
9	Brooke McIntosh / Benjamin Mimar	Canada	114.67	2022 Skate Canada International
10	Valentina Plazas / Maximiliano Fernandez	United States	108.44	2022 Skate Canada International

=== Ice dance ===
Top 10 best scores in the combined total (ice dance)
No.	Team	Nation	Score	Event
1	Piper Gilles / Paul Poirier	Canada	219.49	2022 Grand Prix of Espoo
2	Charlène Guignard / Marco Fabbri	Italy	213.74	2022 MK John Wilson Trophy
3	Madison Chock / Evan Bates	United States	211.94	2022–23 Grand Prix Final
4	Laurence Fournier Beaudry / Nikolaj Sørensen	Canada	210.41	2022 NHK Trophy
5	Lilah Fear / Lewis Gibson	Great Britain	209.18	2022 Skate Canada International
6	Kaitlin Hawayek / Jean-Luc Baker	United States	202.46	2022 Grand Prix of Espoo
7	Marjorie Lajoie / Zachary Lagha	Canada	198.95	2022 MK John Wilson Trophy
8	Caroline Green / Michael Parsons	United States	194.19	2022 Skate Canada International
9	Juulia Turkkila / Matthias Versluis	Finland	191.79	2022 Grand Prix of Espoo
10	Allison Reed / Saulius Ambrulevičius	Lithuania	189.98	2022 NHK Trophy

Top 10 best scores in the rhythm dance
No.	Team	Nation	Score	Event
1	Piper Gilles / Paul Poirier	Canada	87.80	2022 Grand Prix of Espoo
2	Charlène Guignard / Marco Fabbri	Italy	86.30	2022 MK John Wilson Trophy
3	Laurence Fournier Beaudry / Nikolaj Sørensen	Canada	85.66	2022 NHK Trophy
4	Madison Chock / Evan Bates	United States	85.49	2022–23 Grand Prix Final
5	Lilah Fear / Lewis Gibson	Great Britain	85.37	2022 MK John Wilson Trophy
6	Marjorie Lajoie / Zachary Lagha	Canada	81.09	2022 MK John Wilson Trophy
7	Kaitlin Hawayek / Jean-Luc Baker	United States	80.93	2022 Grand Prix of Espoo
8	Caroline Green / Michael Parsons	United States	77.00	2022 NHK Trophy
9	Christina Carreira / Anthony Ponomarenko	United States	76.20	2022 Grand Prix of Espoo
10	Allison Reed / Saulius Ambrulevičius	Lithuania	75.23	2022 NHK Trophy

Top 10 best scores in the free dance
No.	Team	Nation	Score	Event
1	Piper Gilles / Paul Poirier	Canada	131.69	2022 Grand Prix of Espoo
2	Charlène Guignard / Marco Fabbri	Italy	127.44	2022 MK John Wilson Trophy
3	Madison Chock / Evan Bates	United States	126.45	2022–23 Grand Prix Final
4	Lilah Fear / Lewis Gibson	Great Britain	125.38	2022 Skate Canada International
5	Laurence Fournier Beaudry / Nikolaj Sørensen	Canada	124.75	2022 NHK Trophy
6	Kaitlin Hawayek / Jean-Luc Baker	United States	122.95	2022 Skate America
7	Marjorie Lajoie / Zachary Lagha	Canada	119.55	2022 Skate Canada International
8	Caroline Green / Michael Parsons	United States	118.06	2022 Skate Canada International
9	Juulia Turkkila / Matthias Versluis	Finland	116.73	2022 Grand Prix of Espoo
10	Allison Reed / Saulius Ambrulevičius	Lithuania	114.75	2022 NHK Trophy
