= 2022 Grand Prix of Espoo =

2022 figure skating competition

- Type: Grand Prix
- Date: November 25 – 27
- Season: 2022–23
- Location: Espoo
- Venue: Espoo Metro Areena

Champions
- Men's singles: (United States) Ilia Malinin
- Women's singles: (Japan) Mai Mihara
- Pairs: (Italy) Rebecca Ghilardi / Filippo Ambrosini
- Ice dance: (Canada) Piper Gilles / Paul Poirier
- Previous: 2018 Grand Prix of Helsinki
- Next: 2023 Grand Prix of Espoo
- Previous Grand Prix: 2022 NHK Trophy
- Next Grand Prix: 2022–23 Grand Prix Final

The 2022 Grand Prix of Espoo was the sixth event of the 2022–23 ISU Grand Prix of Figure Skating: a senior-level international invitational competition series. It was held at the Espoo Metro Areena in Espoo, Finland, from November 25-27. Medals were awarded in men's singles, women's singles, pair skating, and ice dance. Skaters also earned points toward qualifying for the 2022–23 Grand Prix Final.

In April 2022, the ISU cancelled the Rostelecom Cup in response to the Russian invasion of Ukraine. The Grand Prix of Espoo was named as its replacement on July 14, 2022.

== Entries ==
The International Skating Union announced the preliminary assignments on July 22, 2022.

Country	Men	Women	Pairs	Ice dance
Belgium		Loena Hendrickx		
Canada	Keegan Messing	Madeline Schizas		Piper Gilles / Paul Poirier; Carolane Soucisse / Shane Firus
China				Wang Shiyue / Liu Xinyu
Czech Republic				Natálie Taschlerová / Filip Taschler
Estonia	Arlet Levandi; Aleksandr Selevko	Eva-Lotta Kiibus		
Finland	Valtter Virtanen	Linnea Ceder; Janna Jyrkinen; Jenni Saarinen		Yuka Orihara / Juho Pirinen; Juulia Turkkila / Matthias Versluis
France	Kévin Aymoz			Natacha Lagouge / Arnaud Caffa
Georgia	Morisi Kvitelashvili	Anastasiia Gubanova	Anastasiia Metelkina / Daniil Parkman	
Germany			Alisa Efimova / Ruben Blommaert	
Italy			Rebecca Ghilardi / Filippo Ambrosini; Anna Valesi / Manuel Piazza	
Japan	Lucas Tsuyoshi Honda; Shun Sato; Tatsuya Tsuboi	Mana Kawabe; Rika Kihira; Mai Mihara		
Netherlands			Daria Danilova / Michel Tsiba; Nika Osipova / Dmitry Epstein	
Sweden	Nikolaj Majorov		Greta Crafoord / John Crafoord	
United States	Ilia Malinin; Camden Pulkinen	Bradie Tennell; Lindsay Thorngren	Anastasiia Smirnova / Danylo Siianytsia	Oona Brown / Gage Brown; Christina Carreira / Anthony Ponomarenko; Kaitlin Hawayek / Jean-Luc Baker

=== Changes to preliminary assignments ===
Discipline	Withdrew		Added		Notes	Refs.
Discipline	Date	Skater(s)	Date	Skater(s)	Notes	Refs.
Pairs	August 5	(Australia) Anastasia Golubeva / Hektor Giotopoulos Moore	August 29	(Ukraine) Sofiia Holichenko / Artem Darenskyi	Remained in Juniors	
Pairs	October 26	(China) Peng Cheng / Jin Yang	October 27	(Germany) Alisa Efimova / Ruben Blommaert	Injury (Jin)	
Pairs	October 26	(Ukraine) Sofiia Holichenko / Artem Darenskyi	October 27	(Italy) Anna Valesi / Manuel Piazza	Injury (Holichenko)	
Pairs	November 8	(Canada) Lori-Ann Matte / Thierry Ferland	November 11	(Netherlands) Nika Osipova / Dmitry Epstein	Injury	
Pairs	November 11	(Georgia (country)) Karina Safina / Luka Berulava	November 14	(Sweden) Greta Crafoord / John Crafoord	Injury (Safina)	
Men	November 16	(Kazakhstan) Mikhail Shaidorov	November 17	(Estonia) Aleksandr Selevko		
Women	November 23	(Finland) Emmi Peltonen	November 23	(Finland) Janna Jyrkinen	COVID-19	

== Results ==
=== Men's singles ===
Rank	Skater	Nation	Total points	SP		FS	
1st place, gold medalist(s)	Ilia Malinin	United States	278.39	2	85.57	1	192.82
2nd place, silver medalist(s)	Shun Sato	Japan	262.21	3	81.59	2	180.62
3rd place, bronze medalist(s)	Kévin Aymoz	France	255.69	1	88.96	3	166.73
4	Tatsuya Tsuboi	Japan	244.90	5	78.82	4	166.08
5	Camden Pulkinen	United States	229.92	7	72.45	5	157.47
6	Nikolaj Majorov	Sweden	209.55	8	69.94	6	139.61
7	Arlet Levandi	Estonia	209.50	6	72.67	7	136.83
8	Keegan Messing	Canada	205.02	4	80.12	12	124.09
9	Valtter Virtanen	Finland	204.02	9	69.15	8	134.87
10	Aleksandr Selevko	Estonia	199.47	11	66.96	10	132.51
11	Lucas Tsuyoshi Honda	Japan	197.90	10	67.92	11	129.98
12	Morisi Kvitelashvili	Georgia	196.80	12	62.42	9	134.38

=== Women's singles ===
Rank	Skater	Nation	Total points	SP		FS	
1st place, gold medalist(s)	Mai Mihara	Japan	204.14	2	73.58	1	130.56
2nd place, silver medalist(s)	Loena Hendrickx	Belgium	203.91	1	74.88	3	129.03
3rd place, bronze medalist(s)	Mana Kawabe	Japan	197.41	3	67.03	2	130.38
4	Rika Kihira	Japan	192.43	6	64.07	4	128.36
5	Madeline Schizas	Canada	187.84	5	65.19	5	122.65
6	Lindsay Thorngren	United States	183.23	4	65.75	6	117.48
7	Anastasiia Gubanova	Georgia	166.57	9	56.03	8	110.54
8	Bradie Tennell	United States	163.98	7	60.64	9	103.34
9	Jenni Saarinen	Finland	155.64	8	59.69	11	95.95
10	Janna Jyrkinen	Finland	154.45	12	42.89	7	111.56
11	Linnea Ceder	Finland	151.91	10	55.63	10	96.28
12	Eva-Lotta Kiibus	Estonia	138.89	11	49.27	12	89.62

=== Pairs ===
Rank	Team	Nation	Total points	SP		FS	
1st place, gold medalist(s)	Rebecca Ghilardi / Filippo Ambrosini	Italy	189.74	1	67.31	1	122.43
2nd place, silver medalist(s)	Alisa Efimova / Ruben Blommaert	Germany	170.75	4	62.46	2	108.29
3rd place, bronze medalist(s)	Anastasiia Metelkina / Daniil Parkman	Georgia	166.56	3	62.59	3	103.97
4	Anastasiia Smirnova / Danylo Siianytsia	United States	165.12	2	63.01	4	102.11
5	Daria Danilova / Michel Tsiba	Netherlands	146.15	5	56.41	6	89.74
6	Nika Osipova / Dmitry Epstein	Netherlands	138.10	6	47.97	5	90.13
7	Anna Valesi / Manuel Piazza	Italy	129.02	8	44.36	7	84.66
8	Greta Crafoord / John Crafoord	Sweden	127.37	7	45.79	8	81.58

=== Ice dance ===
Rank	Team	Nation	Total points	RD		FD	
1st place, gold medalist(s)	Piper Gilles / Paul Poirier	Canada	219.49	1	87.80	1	131.69
2nd place, silver medalist(s)	Kaitlin Hawayek / Jean-Luc Baker	United States	202.46	2	80.93	2	121.53
3rd place, bronze medalist(s)	Juulia Turkkila / Matthias Versluis	Finland	191.79	4	75.06	3	116.73
4	Christina Carreira / Anthony Ponomarenko	United States	188.80	3	76.20	4	112.60
5	Natálie Taschlerová / Filip Taschler	Czech Republic	186.39	5	74.60	5	111.79
6	Carolane Soucisse / Shane Firus	Canada	175.63	6	72.38	7	103.25
7	Yuka Orihara / Juho Pirinen	Finland	173.17	8	69.13	6	104.04
8	Oona Brown / Gage Brown	United States	166.70	9	65.71	8	100.99
9	Wang Shiyue / Liu Xinyu	China	165.20	7	69.95	9	95.25
10	Natacha Lagouge / Arnaud Caffa	France	151.63	10	60.07	10	91.56
