= Michel Tsiba =

Dutch pair skater (born 1997)

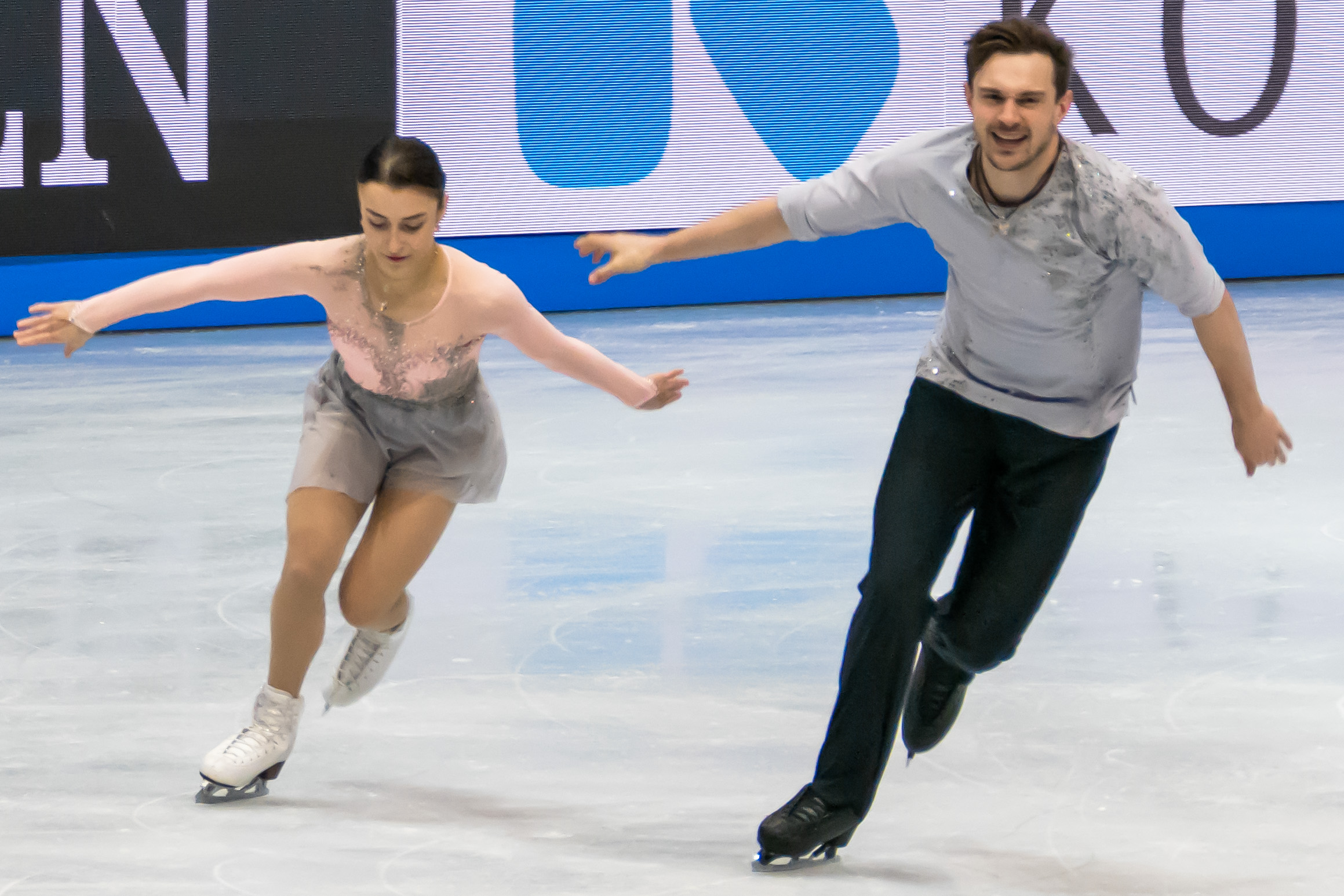
- Daria Danilova and Michel Tsiba performing their short program at the 2025 World Championships

Personal information
- Born: 21 December 1997 (age 28) Groningen, Netherlands
- Home town: Zandvoort, Netherlands
- Height: 1.84 m (6 ft 0 in)

Figure skating career
- Country: Netherlands
- Discipline: Pair skating (since 2018); Men's singles (2012–18)
- Partner: Daria Danilova (since 2018)
- Coach: Dmitri Savin; Fedor Klimov; Pavel Kitashev; Knut Schubert
- Skating club: AIJC Alkmaar
- Began skating: 2006

Medal record
Dutch Championships
Gold medal – first place	2018 The Hague	Singles
Gold medal – first place	2020 The Hague	Pairs
Gold medal – first place	2022 Tilburg	Pairs
Gold medal – first place	2025 Tilburg	Pairs
Silver medal – second place	2015 Den Bosch	Singles
Silver medal – second place	2016 The Hague	Singles
Silver medal – second place	2021 The Hague	Pairs
Silver medal – second place	2023 Tilburg	Pairs

Michel Tsiba (born 21 December 1997) is a Dutch pair skater. With his skating partner, Daria Danilova, he is a three-time Dutch national champion (2020, 2022, 2025), the 2024 Bavarian Open champion, the 2022 NRW Trophy champion, and a two-time International Challenge Cup silver medalist (2022, 2025). They competed in the final segment three European Championships and four World Championships. They are also the first Dutch pair to qualify for the World Championships.

In 2026, Danilova and Tsiba became the first Dutch pair skating team to qualify for a Winter Olympic Games.

== Personal life ==
Tsiba was born on 21 December 1997 in Groningen to a Russian father and a Ukrainian mother. He has an older sister, Irina Tsiba. Tsiba is fluent in Russian.

== Career ==
=== Early career ===
Tsiba started competing at the age of seven. He originally wanted to compete in ice hockey, but was advised to learn to skate in the figure skating club first. As a child, Tsiba experienced bullying from his peers about being a figure skater, who referred to him as "a ballerina in a tutu" and often called him "gay" or other homophobic remarks. Due to the relative obscurity of figure skating in the Netherlands, he admitted to being jealous of popular speed skaters like Sven Kramer when he was young.

As a singles skater, Tsiba was coached by Viola Striegler and Susan Mason and is the 2014 Dutch junior national and 2018 Dutch national champion. He switched disciplines from men's singles to pair skating because he felt that he was too tall to succeed in learning quadruple jumps. Tsiba had a tryout in summer 2017 that ultimately did not work out. He officially retired from singles skating after winning his first senior national title in 2018.

Tsiba teamed up with Russian skater Daria Danilova for the Netherlands in May 2018. Earlier in the season, he had met one of her coaches at a seminar in Berlin and they arranged a tryout. At the start of their partnership, Danilova/Tsiba alternated training in Berlin and Moscow every three months due to the differences in their respective citizenships' visa requirements. The pair fund over half of their training costs out of pocket via Tsiba's student finances.

=== 2018–19 season: Debut of Danilova/Tsiba ===
Danilova/Tsiba won their debut international competition, the 2018 Golden Spin of Zagreb on the junior level. They then placed tenth at the 2019 Bavarian Open. In February, Danilova/Tsiba won the 2019 Dutch junior national title unopposed. However, they missed achieving the minimum TES requirements for the 2019 World Junior Championships.

=== 2019–20 season: European Championships debut ===
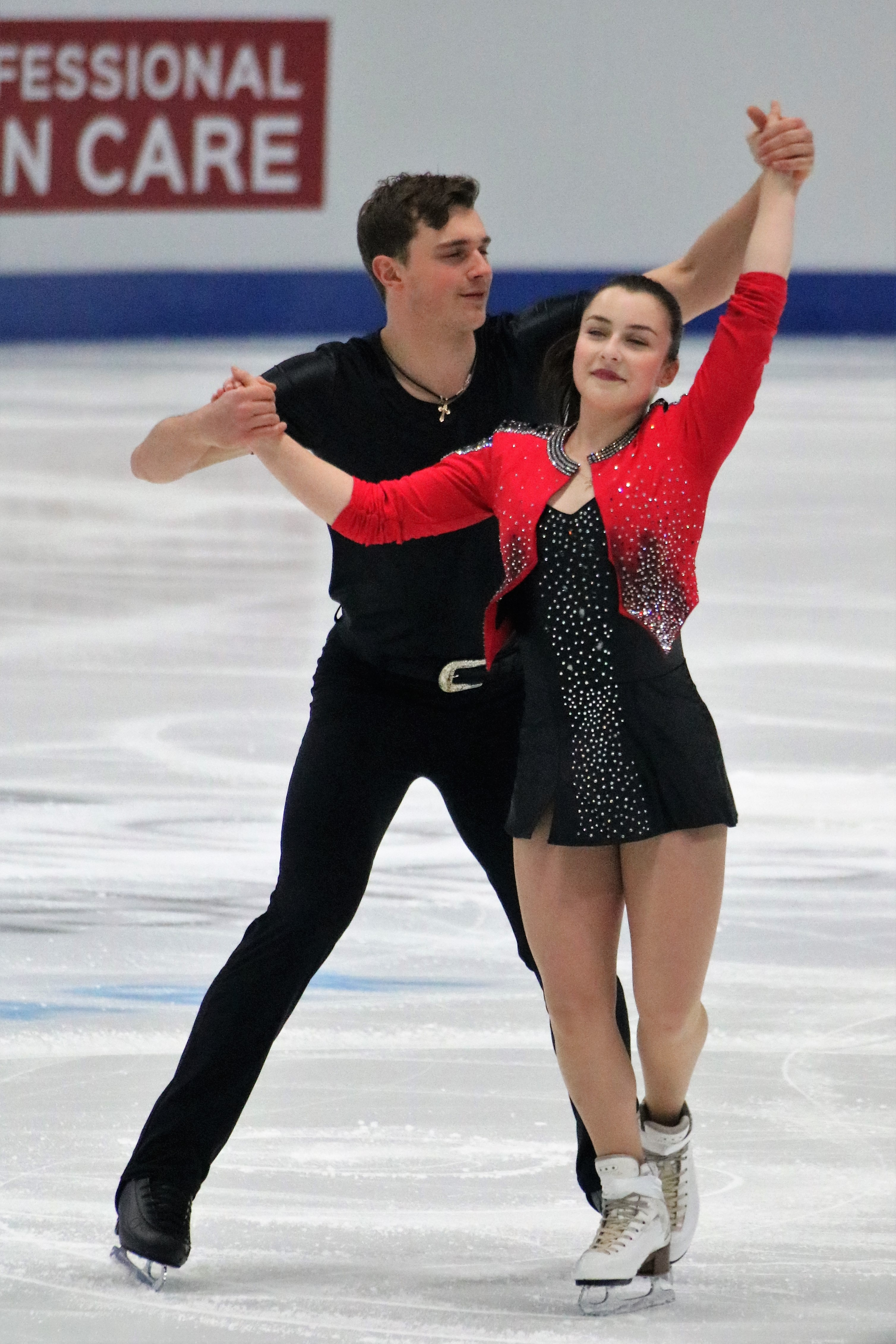
Danilova/Tsiba at the 2020 European Championships

Danilova/Tsiba competed at three Challenger Series events to open the season, finishing tenth at 2019 CS Finlandia Trophy, 17th at 2019 CS Warsaw Cup, and 15th at 2019 CS Golden Spin of Zagreb.

At the 2020 European Championships in January, Danilova/Tsiba became the first Dutch pair in 24 years to compete at a European Championships since Jeltje Schulten / Alcuin Schulten last represented the country at the event in 1996. They qualified to the final segment and finished 16th overall. In February, they finished eighth at the Bavarian Open and tenth at the Challenge Cup; the latter event doubled as the Dutch Championships where, as the only Dutch pair, Danilova/Tsiba won their first senior national title.

At the Challenge Cup, Danilova/Tsiba earned the necessary TES minimums for the 2020 World Championships. They are the first Dutch pair in history to qualify for the World Championships. The event was eventually cancelled due to the COVID-19 pandemic.

=== 2020–21 season: World Championships debut ===
During the offseason, Tsiba underwent surgery to repair a torn meniscus. However, the pair did not start training together again until the end of August due to issues with Danilova's Dutch visa. Danilova/Tsiba made their season debut at the 2020 NRW Autumn Trophy in November and won their first senior international medal, bronze behind Germans Annika Hocke / Robert Kunkel and Minerva Fabienne Hase / Nolan Seegert. Making their debut at the World Championships in Stockholm, they placed twenty-second.

=== 2021–22 season ===
Beginning the season at the 2021 Lombardia Trophy, Danilova/Tsiba placed eighth. They competed at the 2021 CS Nebelhorn Trophy, placing ninth and failing to qualify a place at the 2022 Winter Olympics. Their third Challenger event, the 2021 CS Warsaw Cup, Danilova/Tsiba were fifteenth. They finished twenty-first at the 2022 European Championships, missing the free skate.

Danilova/Tsiba concluded the season at the 2022 World Championships, where they finished a career-best ninth in a field depleted due to Russia being banned as a result of their invasion of Ukraine and the Chinese Skating Association opted not to send athletes to compete in Montpellier.

=== 2022–23 season: Grand Prix debut ===
Danilova/Tsiba decided that the Russian invasion of Ukraine would not affect their training in Russia, opting to spend about half their time in Sochi, Russia, and half in Heerenveen, Netherlands. On training in Russia, they commented: "We don't notice the war here. It's shockingly quiet." They were unable to compete at the 2022 Skate America because Danilova's visa application was declined.

Danilova/Tsiba began their season with a sixth-place finish at the 2022 CS Finlandia Trophy. They finished sixth as well at the 2022 NHK Trophy, their Grand Prix debut, and then fifth at the 2022 Grand Prix of Espoo. Nika Osipova / Dmitry Epstein won the Netherlands' only pair skating berth at the 2023 European Championships. Domestic rivals Osipova/Epstein won the Netherlands' only pair skating berth at the 2023 European Championships. However, due to Danilova/Tsiba's ninth-place finish at the prior year's World Championships, both teams were able to attend the 2023 edition in Saitama. Both Dutch teams qualified for the free skate segment, a first in the history of the event, with Danilova/Tsiba finishing thirteenth, the higher-ranked of the two.

=== 2023–24 season ===
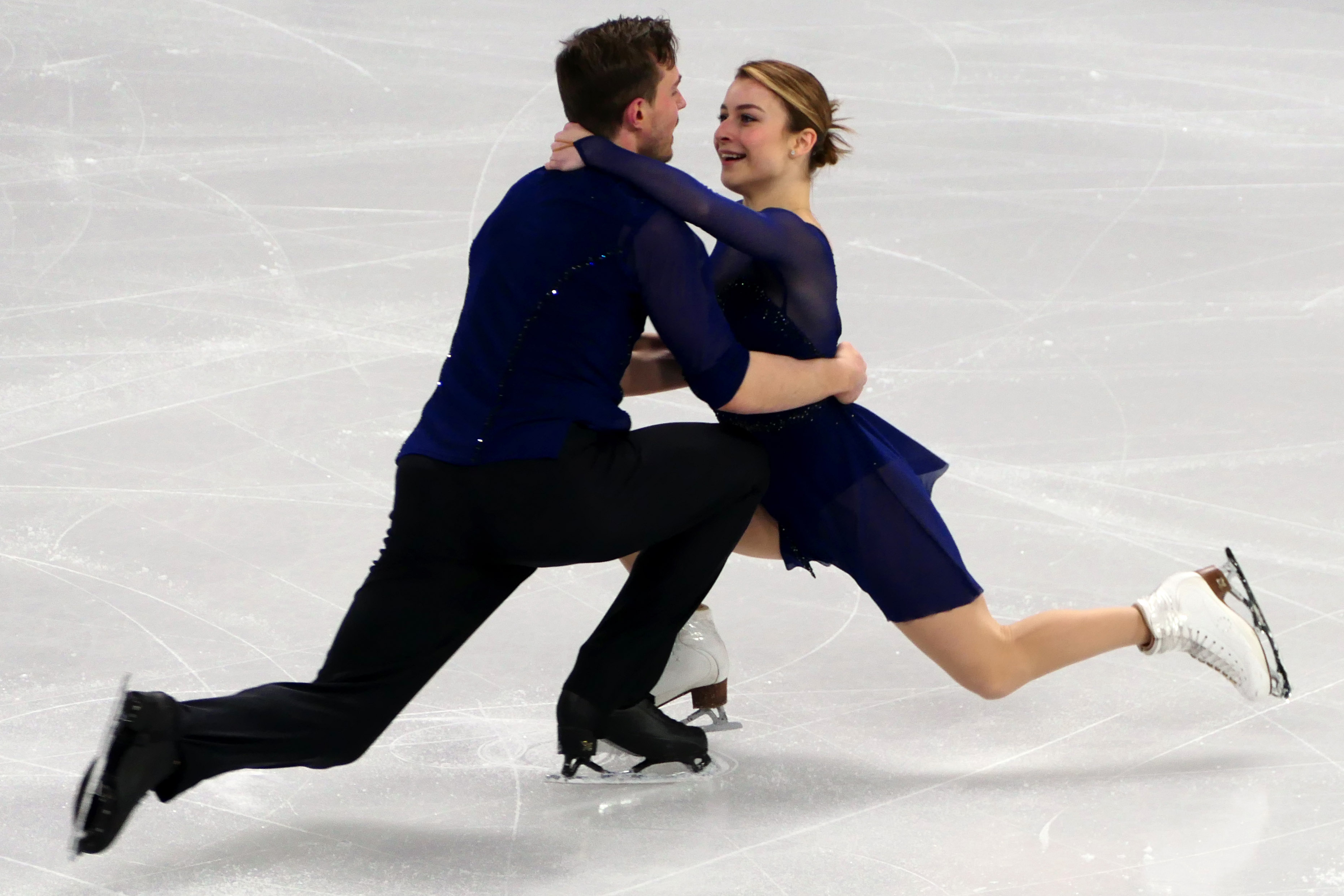
Danilova/Tsiba performing a pair combination spin at the 2024 World Championships

Beginning the season at the 2023 CS Lombardia Trophy, Danilova/Tsiba came sixth. On the Grand Prix, they were seventh at the 2023 Skate Canada International. At the 2023 NHK Trophy they placed fifth, equaling their prior best placement, both praising the reception from the Japanese audience.

Danilova/Tsiba came eighth at the 2024 European Championships. Finishing the season at the 2024 World Championships, they came fourteenth.

=== 2024–25 season ===
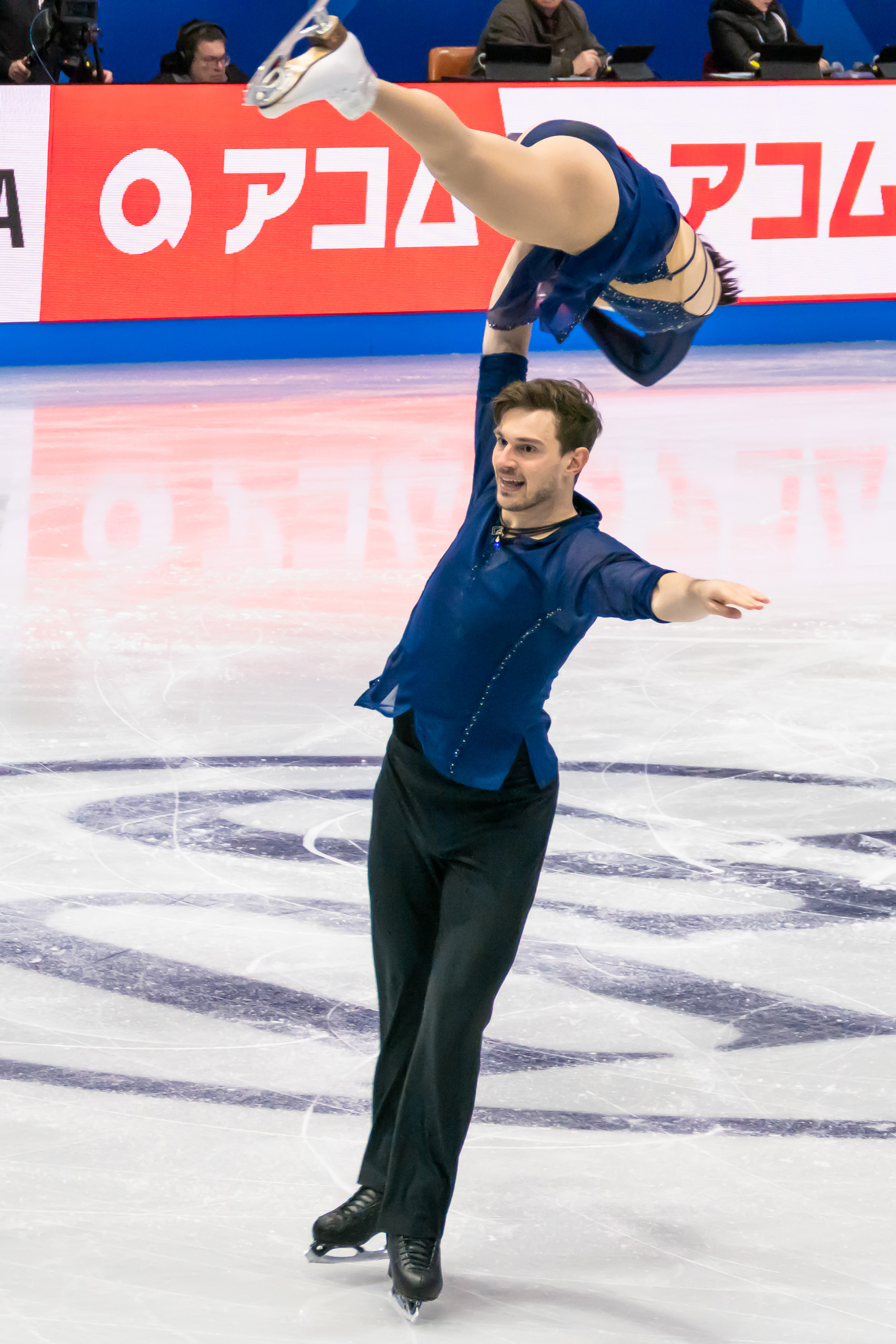
Danilova and Tsiba performing a lift during their free skate at the 2025 World Championships

Danilova/Tsiba began the season with a fourth-place finish at the 2024 Tayside Trophy. Going on to compete on the 2024–25 Grand Prix circuit, the pair finished seventh at the 2024 Skate Canada International and fifth at the 2024 NHK Trophy. They followed up these results with a fifth-place finish at the 2024 CS Warsaw Cup.

In January, Danilova/Tsiba competed at the 2025 European Championships in Tallinn, Estonia, where they finished in tenth place. The pair followed this up by winning silver at the 2025 International Challenge Cup, before subsequently finishing sixth at the Road to 26 Trophy in Milan, Italy, a test event for the 2026 Winter Olympics.

Danilova/Tsiba finished the season by placing fifteenth at the 2025 World Championships in Boston, Massachusetts, United States.

=== 2025–26 season: Milano Cortina Olympics ===
Although their placement at the World Championships, by ISU standards, was enough to award the Netherlands an Olympic berth for pair skating at the 2026 Winter Olympics, the NOC*NSF set an additional requirement for Danilova/Tsiba to achieve a minimum combined total score of 173.89 in order to achieve the Olympic spot.

Danilova/Tsiba began the season by competing on the 2025–26 ISU Challenger Series, placing fifth at the 2025 CS Kinoshita Group Cup and twelfth at the 2025 CS Nebelhorn Trophy. They subsequently competed at the 2025 CS Trialeti Trophy, but withdrew following the short program due to Tsiba suffering a shoulder injury.

Assigned to compete at the 2025 NHK Trophy, Danilova/Tsiba finished the event in seventh place. In early December, they competed at the 2025 CS Golden Spin of Zagreb, their last chance to earn the required combined total score to earn the Olympic spot. However, the pair failed to achieve this, finishing eighth overall.

Following this, skating fans began a Change.org petition, requesting that Danilova/Tsiba be awarded the Olympic spot. Additionally, the KNSB (Royal Dutch Skating Federation) submitted a request to the NOC*NSF to allow the pair to citing that the pair had a fourteenth-place world ranking and otherwise met all ISU requirements to compete at the upcoming Olympics.

On 22 December, Danilova/Tsiba shared via their Instagram that the NOC*NSF had ultimately decided to allow them to have the Olympic spot, making them the first Dutch figure skating pair team to qualify for an Olympic Games. Tsiba later thanked those that started and signed the petition, saying, "We were so surprised to see who all supported us. Especially the other skaters. They know what it takes. They understand that the Olympic situation in figure skating is maybe even more important than in other sports. And when you feel that support, you know everybody just wants you to go. The love I felt then was amazing. So another big thank you to everyone."

In January, Danilova/Tsiba competed at the 2026 European Championships, finishing in fifteenth place.

=== 2026-27 season: hiatus ===
On June 16, they were named to 2026 Skate America and 2026 NHK Trophy. On July 31, Danilova announced on her Instagram that they would be taking the 2026–27 season off to "focus on our health, strength, and improving various aspects of our skating." Thus, they would be withdrawing from both of their GP events.

== Programs ==
=== With Danilova ===
Season	Short program	Free skating
2025–26	Take Back the Power by Raury choreo. by Joti Polizoakis	Stairway to Heaven by Led Zeppelin choreo. by Pasquale Camerlengo
2024–25	Give Me Love by Ed Sheeran choreo. by Sofia Evdokimova	The Chain by Fleetwood Mac choreo. by Nikita Mikhailov
2023–24	The Hunger Games; Everybody Wants to Rule the World by Tears for Fears performed by Lorde; The Hanging Tree by James Newton Howard ft. Jennifer Lawrence choreo. by Sofia Evdokimova	The Chain by Fleetwood Mac choreo. by Nikita Mikhailov
2022–23	The Hunger Games; Everybody Wants to Rule the World by Tears for Fears performed by Lorde; The Hanging Tree by James Newton Howard ft. Jennifer Lawrence choreo. by Sofia Evdokimova	Harriet; Goodbye Song by Cynthia Erivo & Terence Blanchard; Stand Up by Cynthia Erivo choreo. by Nikita Mikhailov
2020–22	Bad Guy by Billie Eilish performed by Ariana Savalas choreo. by Joti Polizoakis	All by Myself by Eric Carmen; I'll Be There for You by The Rembrandts choreo. by Joti Polizoakis
2019–20	Don't Stop Me Now by Queen choreo. by Paul Boll	Greased Lighnin' (from Grease) performed by John Travolta; Hopelessly Devoted to You (from Grease Live!) performed by Julianne Hough; You're the One That I Want (from Grease) performed by John Travolta, Olivia Newton-John choreo. by Olga Orlova
2018–19	Secrets by OneRepublic choreo. by Olga Orlova	Greased Lighnin' (from Grease) performed by John Travolta; Hopelessly Devoted to You (from Grease Live!) performed by Julianne Hough; You're the One That I Want (from Grease) performed by John Travolta, Olivia Newton-John choreo. by Olga Orlova

=== Men's singles ===
Season	Short program	Free skating
2016–17	Cool (from West Side Story) by Leonard Bernstein performed by Cody Green choreo. by Mark Pillay	James Brown medley by James Brown choreo. by Paul Boll
2015–16	Grease by Jim Jacobs, Warren Casey, John Farrar choreo. by Susan Mason	The Passion of the Christ by John Debney choreo. by Julie Marcotte

== Competitive highlights ==
- GP – Event of the ISU Grand Prix Series
- CS – Event of the ISU Challenger Series
- JGP – Event of the ISU Junior Grand Prix Series
- TBD – Assigned
- WD – Withdrew from competition

=== Pair skating with Daria Danilova ===
Competition placements at senior level
Season	2019–20	2020–21	2021–22	2022–23	2023–24	2024–25	2025–26
Winter Olympics							17th
World Championships		22nd	9th	13th	14th	15th	21st
European Championships	16th		21st		8th	10th	15th
Dutch Championships	1st	2nd	1st	2nd		1st	
GP Finland				5th			
GP NHK Trophy				6th	5th	5th	7th
GP Skate Canada					7th	7th	
CS Finlandia Trophy	10th			6th			
CS Golden Spin of Zagreb	15th			8th			8th
CS Kinoshita Group Cup							5th
CS Lombardia Trophy			8th		6th		
CS Nebelhorn Trophy			9th				12th
CS Trialeti Trophy							WD
CS Warsaw Cup	17th		15th			5th	
Bavarian Open	8th			2nd	1st		
Budapest Trophy					3rd		
Challenge Cup	10th	7th	2nd	5th		2nd	
NRW Trophy		3rd	1st				
Road to 26 Trophy						6th	
Tayside Trophy						4th	

Competition placements at junior level
Season	2018–19
Dutch Championships	1st
Bavarian Open	10th
Challenge Cup	1st
Golden Spin of Zagreb	1st

=== Single skating ===
Competition placements at senior level
Season	2014–15	2015–16	2016–17	2017–18
Dutch Championships	2nd	2nd		1st
CS Tallinn Trophy				23rd
Challenge Cup				13th
Cup of Nice				18th
Winter Universiade			32nd	

Competition placements at junior level
Season	2012–13	2013–14	2014–15	2015–16	2016–17
Dutch Championships	3rd	1st			1st
JGP Austria				21st	
JGP France					21st
JGP Germany					27th
JGP Latvia				22nd	
Bavarian Open		27th	10th	17th	
Challenge Cup		8th	8th		8th
Coupe du Printemps		14th	9th		
Crystal Skate of Romania			6th		
Lombardia Trophy		12th	10th		8th
Mentor Toruń Cup			9th		
Merano Cup					15th
NRW Trophy		17th	8th	14th	13th
Skate Helena				4th	
Tallinn Trophy					8th
Volvo Open Cup		14th		10th	
World Development Trophy				6th	

== Detailed results ==
=== Pair skating with Daria Danilova ===
ISU personal best scores in the +5/-5 GOE System
Segment	Type	Score	Event
Total	TSS	178.37	2024 NHK Trophy
Short program	TSS	64.07	2026 Winter Olympics
Short program	TES	36.87	2026 Winter Olympics
Short program	PCS	27.36	2023 NHK Trophy
Free skating	TSS	119.47	2024 NHK Trophy
Free skating	TES	64.71	2023 NHK Trophy
Free skating	PCS	57.11	2024 NHK Trophy

==== Senior level ====
Results in the 2019–20 season
Date	Event	SP		FS		Total	
Date	Event	P	Score	P	Score	P	Score
Oct 11–13, 2019	(Finland) 2019 CS Finlandia Trophy	9	43.56	10	75.34	10	118.90
Nov 14–17, 2019	(Poland) 2019 CS Warsaw Cup	18	38.90	18	80.54	17	119.44
Dec 4–7, 2019	(Croatia) 2019 CS Golden Spin of Zagreb	13	47.86	16	87.85	15	135.71
Jan 20–26, 2020	(Austria) 2020 European Championships	16	46.10	16	70.20	16	116.30
Feb 3–9, 2020	(Germany) 2020 Bavarian Open	8	46.92	9	83.91	8	130.83
Feb 20–23, 2020	(Netherlands) 2021 International Challenge Cup	5	51.81	10	85.92	10	137.73
Feb 20–23, 2020	(Netherlands) 2020 Dutch Championships (Note: In the Netherlands, the International Challenge Cup also serves as the Dutch Championships.)	1	—N/a	1	—N/a	1	—N/a

Results in the 2020–21 season
Date	Event	SP		FS		Total	
Date	Event	P	Score	P	Score	P	Score
Nov 26–29, 2020	(Germany) 2020 NRW Trophy	3	43.86	4	70.88	3	114.74
Feb 26–28, 2021	(Netherlands) 2021 International Challenge Cup	8	48.87	6	88.23	7	137.10
Feb 26–28, 2021	(Netherlands) 2021 Dutch Championships	2	—N/a	1	—N/a	2	—N/a
Mar 22–28, 2021	(Sweden) 2021 World Championships	22	43.12	—N/a	—N/a	22	43.12

Results in the 2021–22 season
Date	Event	SP		FS		Total	
Date	Event	P	Score	P	Score	P	Score
Sep 10–12, 2021	(Italy) 2021 Lombardia Trophy	7	45.14	8	88.73	8	133.87
Sep 22–25, 2021	(Germany) 2021 CS Nebelhorn Trophy	8	55.39	9	89.87	9	145.26
Nov 4–7, 2021	(Germany) 2021 NRW Trophy	1	50.61	1	101.85	1	152.46
Nov 17–20, 2021	(Poland) 2021 CS Warsaw Cup	14	55.45	15	89.28	15	144.73
Jan 10–16, 2022	(Estonia) 2022 European Championships	21	36.86	—N/a	—N/a	21	36.86
Feb 24–27, 2022	(Netherlands) 2022 International Challenge Cup	2	53.57	2	95.83	2	149.40
Feb 24–27, 2022	(Netherlands) 2022 Dutch Championships	1	—N/a	1	—N/a	1	—N/a
Mar 21–27, 2022	(France) 2022 World Championships	11	49.52	9	99.03	9	148.55

Results in the 2022–23 season
Date	Event	SP		FS		Total	
Date	Event	P	Score	P	Score	P	Score
Oct 4–9, 2022	(Finland) 2022 CS Finlandia Trophy	6	56.27	5	102.65	6	158.92
Nov 17–20, 2022	(Japan) 2022 NHK Trophy	6	54.46	6	101.38	6	155.84
Nov 25–27, 2022	(Finland) 2022 Grand Prix of Espoo	5	56.41	6	89.74	5	146.15
Dec 7–10, 2022	(Croatia) 2022 CS Golden Spin of Zagreb	6	58.17	8	98.79	8	156.96
Jan 31 – Feb 5, 2023	(Germany) 2023 Bavarian Open	1	66.00	2	101.49	2	167.49
Feb 23–26, 2023	(Netherlands) 2023 International Challenge Cup	5	57.28	5	100.50	5	157.78
Feb 23–26, 2023	(Netherlands) 2023 Dutch Championships	2	—N/a	2	—N/a	2	—N/a
Mar 20–26, 2023	(Japan) 2023 World Championships	12	61.24	12	112.61	13	173.85

Results in the 2023–24 season
Date	Event	SP		FS		Total	
Date	Event	P	Score	P	Score	P	Score
Sep 8–10, 2023	(Italy) 2023 CS Lombardia Trophy	8	53.58	6	106.89	6	160.47
Oct 13–15, 2023	(Hungary) 2023 Budapest Trophy	3	61.66	4	107.73	3	169.39
Oct 27–29, 2023	2023 Skate Canada International	6	57.17	6	107.84	7	165.01
Nov 24–26, 2023	(Japan) 2023 NHK Trophy	6	58.61	5	118.93	5	177.54
Jan 8–14, 2024	(Lithuania) 2024 European Championships	10	53.95	8	113.37	8	167.32
Jan 30 – Feb 4, 2024	(Germany) 2024 Bavarian Open	1	61.35	1	115.90	1	177.25
Mar 18–24, 2024	(Canada) 2024 World Championships	17	59.07	12	113.17	14	172.24

Results in the 2024–25 season
Date	Event	SP		FS		Total	
Date	Event	P	Score	P	Score	P	Score
Oct 12–13, 2024	(United Kingdom) 2024 Tayside Trophy	4	52.69	5	94.55	4	147.24
Oct 25–27, 2024	2024 Skate Canada International	7	58.78	7	112.24	7	171.02
Nov 8–10, 2024	(Japan) 2024 NHK Trophy	6	58.90	5	119.47	5	178.37
Nov 20–24, 2024	(Poland) 2024 CS Warsaw Cup	6	54.21	4	111.80	5	166.01
Jan 28 – Feb 2, 2025	(Estonia) 2025 European Championships	11	56.52	10	110.32	10	166.84
Feb 13–16, 2025	(Netherlands) 2025 Challenge Cup	3	54.34	2	113.73	2	169.07
Feb 18–20, 2025	(Italy) Road to 26 Trophy	5	52.22	5	100.30	6	152.52
Mar 25–30, 2025	(United States) 2025 World Championships	15	58.77	16	112.04	15	170.81

Results in the 2025–26 season
Date	Event	SP		FS		Total	
Date	Event	P	Score	P	Score	P	Score
Sep 5–7, 2025	(Japan) 2025 CS Kinoshita Group Cup	5	56.47	5	101.77	5	158.24
Sep 25–27, 2025	(Germany) 2025 CS Nebelhorn Trophy	8	62.69	13	96.84	12	159.53
Oct 8–11, 2025	(Georgia (country)) 2025 CS Trialeti Trophy	8	55.20	WD	—N/a	WD	—N/a
Nov 7–9, 2025	(Japan) 2025 NHK Trophy	7	56.74	6	98.46	7	155.20
Dec 3–6, 2025	(Croatia) 2025 CS Golden Spin of Zagreb	6	60.07	10	100.31	8	160.38
Jan 13–18, 2026	(United Kingdom) 2026 European Championships	15	46.57	13	102.76	15	149.33
Feb 15-16, 2026	(Italy) 2026 Winter Olympics	17	64.07	—N/a	—N/a	17	64.07
Mar 24–29, 2026	(Czech Republic) 2026 World Championships	21	48.77	—N/a	—N/a	21	48.77

==== Junior level ====
Results in the 2018–19 season
Date	Event	SP		FS		Total	
Date	Event	P	Score	P	Score	P	Score
Dec 5–8, 2018	(Croatia) 2018 Golden Spin of Zagreb	1	37.67	1	76.33	1	114.00
Feb 5–10, 2019	(Germany) 2019 Bavarian Open	12	36.74	10	73.18	10	109.92
Feb 21–24, 2019	(Netherlands) 2023 International Challenge Cup	1	43.33	1	74.44	1	117.77
Feb 21–24, 2019	(Netherlands) 2023 Dutch Championships (Junior)	1	—N/a	1	—N/a	1	—N/a
