= 2022 NHK Trophy =

- Type: Grand Prix
- Date: November 18 – 20
- Season: 2022–23
- Location: Sapporo, Japan
- Host: Japan Skating Federation
- Venue: Makomanai Ice Arena

Champions
- Men's singles: (Japan) Shoma Uno
- Women's singles: (South Korea) Kim Ye-lim
- Pairs: (Japan) Riku Miura / Ryuichi Kihara
- Ice dance: (Canada) Laurence Fournier Beaudry / Nikolaj Sørensen
- Previous: 2021 NHK Trophy
- Next: 2023 NHK Trophy
- Previous GP: 2022 MK John Wilson Trophy
- Next GP: 2022 Grand Prix of Espoo

The 2022 NHK Trophy was the fifth event of the 2022-23 ISU Grand Prix of Figure Skating: a senior-level international invitational competition series. It was held at the Makomanai Ice Arena in Sapporo, Japan, from November 18-20. Medals were awarded in men's singles, women's singles, pair skating, and ice dance. Skaters earned points toward qualifying for the 2022-23 Grand Prix Final.

== Entries ==
The International Skating Union announced the preliminary assignments on July 22, 2022.

Country	Men	Women	Pairs	Ice dance
Austria	Maurizio Zandron	Olga Mikutina		
Canada	Stephen Gogolev; Conrad Orzel		Brooke McIntosh / Benjamin Mimar	Laurence Fournier Beaudry / Nikolaj Sørensen
China				Wang Shiyue / Liu Xinyu
Estonia		Eva-Lotta Kiibus; Niina Petrõkina		
Finland				Yuka Orihara / Juho Pirinen
France	Adam Siao Him Fa		Camille Kovalev / Pavel Kovalev	Evgenia Lopareva / Geoffrey Brissaud
Georgia	Nika Egadze			
Italy	Gabriele Frangipani; Matteo Rizzo		Irma Caldara / Riccardo Maglio	
Japan	Kazuki Tomono; Shoma Uno; Sōta Yamamoto	Kaori Sakamoto; Rion Sumiyoshi; Rinka Watanabe	Riku Miura / Ryuichi Kihara	Kana Muramoto / Daisuke Takahashi; Misato Komatsubara / Tim Koleto
Lithuania				Allison Reed / Saulius Ambrulevičius
Netherlands			Daria Danilova / Michel Tsiba	
South Korea	Cha Jun-hwan	Ji Seo-yeon; Wi Seo-yeong; Kim Ye-lim		
United States	Tomoki Hiwatashi	Starr Andrews; Amber Glenn; Audrey Shin	Emily Chan / Spencer Akira Howe	Madison Chock / Evan Bates; Caroline Green / Michael Parsons; Katarina Wolfkostin / Jeffrey Chen

== Changes to preliminary assignments ==
Discipline	Withdrew		Added		Notes	Ref.
Discipline	Date	Skater(s)	Date	Skater(s)	Notes	Ref.
Men	—		September 1	(Japan) Sōta Yamamoto	Host picks	
Women	—		September 1	(Japan) Rion Sumiyoshi	Host picks	
Ice dance	—		September 1	(Japan) Misato Komatsubara / Tim Koleto	Host picks	
Women	September 6	(Azerbaijan) Ekaterina Ryabova	September 22	(Estonia) Eva-Lotta Kiibus	Ryabova retired.	
Pairs	October 4	(Australia) Maria Chernyshova / Harley Windsor	October 14	(Netherlands) Daria Danilova / Michel Tsiba	Injury (Windsor)	
Women	October 5	(Japan) Wakaba Higuchi	October 6	(Japan) Rinka Watanabe	Injury	
Men	October 27	(China) Jin Boyang	October 27	(Canada) Conrad Orzel	Recovery from surgery	
Pairs	November 11	(Czech Republic) Jelizaveta Žuková / Martin Bidař	—			
Pairs	November 15	(Germany) Annika Hocke / Robert Kunkel	—		Positive COVID-19 test (Hocke)	

== Results ==
=== Men's singles ===
Rank	Skater	Nation	Total points	SP		FS	
1st place, gold medalist(s)	Shoma Uno	Japan	279.76	2	91.66	1	188.10
2nd place, silver medalist(s)	Sōta Yamamoto	Japan	257.85	1	96.49	6	161.36
3rd place, bronze medalist(s)	Cha Jun-hwan	South Korea	254.76	6	80.35	2	174.41
4	Kazuki Tomono	Japan	251.83	4	85.07	3	166.76
5	Adam Siao Him Fa	France	250.45	3	87.44	4	163.01
6	Matteo Rizzo	Italy	240.76	7	78.57	5	162.19
7	Nika Egadze	Georgia	232.86	5	84.47	8	148.39
8	Stephen Gogolev	Canada	221.02	9	69.01	7	152.01
9	Gabriele Frangipani	Italy	212.31	10	68.78	9	143.53
10	Conrad Orzel	Canada	202.69	8	73.10	11	129.59
11	Maurizio Zandron	Austria	201.72	11	68.21	10	133.51
12	Tomoki Hiwatashi	United States	185.05	12	57.18	12	127.87

=== Women's singles ===
Rank	Skater	Nation	Total points	SP		FS	
1st place, gold medalist(s)	Kim Ye-lim	South Korea	204.49	1	72.22	2	132.27
2nd place, silver medalist(s)	Kaori Sakamoto	Japan	201.87	2	68.07	1	133.80
3rd place, bronze medalist(s)	Rion Sumiyoshi	Japan	193.12	3	68.01	4	125.11
4	Audrey Shin	United States	189.00	4	65.87	5	123.13
5	Rinka Watanabe	Japan	188.07	9	58.36	3	129.71
6	Ji Seo-yeon	South Korea	184.14	6	62.92	7	121.22
7	Niina Petrõkina	Estonia	180.29	8	58.81	6	121.48
8	Wi Seo-yeong	South Korea	176.74	7	61.06	10	115.68
9	Starr Andrews	United States	174.06	5	64.13	12	109.93
10	Olga Mikutina	Austria	173.36	10	56.95	9	116.41
11	Amber Glenn	United States	169.36	11	52.04	8	117.32
12	Eva-Lotta Kiibus	Estonia	162.37	12	48.56	11	113.81

=== Pairs ===
Rank	Team	Nation	Total points	SP		FS	
1st place, gold medalist(s)	Riku Miura / Ryuichi Kihara	Japan	216.16	1	78.25	1	137.91
2nd place, silver medalist(s)	Emily Chan / Spencer Akira Howe	United States	187.49	2	64.62	2	122.87
3rd place, bronze medalist(s)	Brooke McIntosh / Benjamin Mimar	Canada	175.65	3	62.31	3	113.34
4	Irma Caldara / Riccardo Maglio	Italy	164.23	4	58.95	5	105.28
5	Camille Kovalev / Pavel Kovalev	France	162.01	5	55.36	4	106.65
6	Daria Danilova / Michel Tsiba	Netherlands	155.84	6	54.46	6	101.38

=== Ice dance ===
Rank	Team	Nation	Total points	RD		FD	
1st place, gold medalist(s)	Laurence Fournier Beaudry / Nikolaj Sørensen	Canada	210.41	1	85.66	1	124.75
2nd place, silver medalist(s)	Madison Chock / Evan Bates	United States	209.13	2	85.00	2	124.13
3rd place, bronze medalist(s)	Caroline Green / Michael Parsons	United States	191.10	3	77.00	4	114.10
4	Allison Reed / Saulius Ambrulevičius	Lithuania	189.98	4	75.23	3	114.75
5	Evgeniia Lopareva / Geoffrey Brissaud	France	184.63	6	72.84	5	111.79
6	Kana Muramoto / Daisuke Takahashi	Japan	178.78	5	75.10	7	103.68
7	Wang Shiyue / Liu Xinyu	China	174.11	7	70.32	6	103.79
8	Yuka Orihara / Juho Pirinen	Finland	168.45	9	66.47	8	101.98
9	Misato Komatsubara / Tim Koleto	Japan	164.30	8	66.65	9	97.65
10	Katarina Wolfkostin / Jeffrey Chen	United States	148.01	10	64.94	10	83.07
