= Dmitry Epstein =

Dutch pair skater

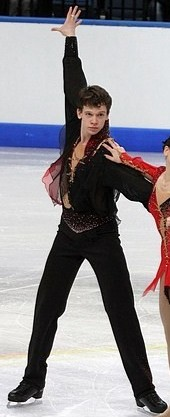

Personal information
- Born: 10 August 1993 (age 33) Enschede, Netherlands
- Home town: The Hague, Netherlands
- Height: 1.82 m (5 ft 11 1/2 in)

Figure skating career
- Country: Netherlands
- Coach: Dmitri Kaplun, Aljona Savchenko
- Skating club: HIJH Den Haag
- Began skating: 2003

Dmitry Epstein (born 10 August 1993) is a Dutch pair skater. He has won four senior international medals with his skating partner, Nika Osipova.

Earlier in his career, he skated with his twin sister, Rachel. The two competed at three consecutive World Junior Championships.

== Personal life ==
Dmitry Epstein and his twin sister, Rachel, were born on 10 August 1993 in Enschede, Netherlands.

== Career ==
=== Early years ===
Epstein began learning to skate in 2003. Early in his career, he skated in partnership with his twin sister, Rachel. The two competed in novice pairs during the 2008–09 season and moved up to juniors the following season. They represented the Netherlands at three consecutive World Junior Championships (2011, 2012, and 2013).

The Epstein twins trained in Zoetermeer, Netherlands; Stavanger, Norway; and Moscow, Russia. Their coaches included Alexander Artyshenko, Arina Ushakova, Pavel Kitashev, Zsolt Kerekes, Dmitri Boyenko, Aneta Kowalska, and Chris Laheij.

Beginning with the 2018–19 season, Epstein skated two seasons with Finland's Liubov Efimenko for the Netherlands. In February 2019, making their international debut, they finished seventh at the Bavarian Open and fourth at the International Challenge Cup. In September, they placed eleventh at the 2019 CS Nebelhorn Trophy. The two were coached by Dmitri Kaplun in The Hague.

=== 2020–21 season ===
Epstein teamed up with Russia's Nika Osipova after contacting her via a website, IcePartnerSearch. He said, "It was in the middle of the pandemic, so we couldn't meet or try out together on the ice if it would work. We wanted to lose as little time as possible, so as soon as traveling became possible again, she immediately came to The Hague. We immediately started skating together and since then she has stayed in the Netherlands."

Osipova/Epstein decided to represent the Netherlands. In February 2021, they placed sixth at the International Challenge Cup, their sole international event that season.

=== 2021–22 season ===
In October, Osipova/Epstein placed 15th at the 2021 CS Finlandia Trophy. In November, they were second of two pairs at the NRW Trophy. They won bronze at the Bavarian Open in January 2022 and at the International Challenge Cup in February.

=== 2022–23 season ===
Epstein continued to be affected by lung problems related to long COVID, having first developed the disease two years earlier.

In November 2022, Osipova/Epstein won silver at the Ice Challenge in Austria. Later that month, they competed at the 2022 Grand Prix of Espoo, to which they were invited a couple of weeks before the event. Making their Grand Prix debut, they placed fifth in Finland.

Osipova/Epstein edged out Daria Danilova / Michel Tsiba to claim the Netherlands' only pair skating berth at the 2023 European Championships.

== Programs ==
=== With Nika Osipova ===
Season	Short program	Free skating
2022–2023	Exit Music (For a Film) by Radiohead	Prelude (Age of Heroes) by Balázs Havasi
2021–2022	Seven Nation Army performed by Postmodern Jukebox, Haley Reinhart	

=== With Liubov Efimenko ===
Season	Short program	Free skating
2019–2020	Oops!... I Did It Again performed by Postmodern Jukebox, Haley Reinhart; ...Baby One More Time performed by The Baseballs choreo. by Sergei Komolov, Alexander Levenka	Stand by Me performed by Florence and the Machine; Say Something performed by Madilyn Bailey, RUNAGROUND; Golden Brush performed by Balázs Havasi choreo. by Sergei Komolov, Alexander Levenka
2018–2019	Oops!... I Did It Again performed by Postmodern Jukebox, Haley Reinhart; ...Baby One More Time performed by The Baseballs choreo. by Sergei Komolov, Alexander Levenka	

=== With Rachel Epstein ===
Season	Short program	Free skating
2012–2013	Highway to Hell by AC/DC choreo. by Arina Ushakova	The Lion King by Elton John choreo. by Arina Ushakova
2011–2012	Rumba Claro de Luna (based on Moonlight Sonata) by Gustavo Montesano, Ludwig van Beethoven choreo. by Igor Tchiniaev	Capone by Ronan Hardiman choreo. by Igor Tchiniaev
2010–2011	Bolero (from Moulin Rouge!) choreo. by Elena Maslennikova, Igor Tchiniaev	Capone by Ronan Hardiman choreo. by Igor Tchiniaev

== Competitive highlights ==
GP: Grand Prix; CS: Challenger Series; JGP: Junior Grand Prix

=== Pairs with Nika Osipova ===
International
Event	20–21	21–22	22–23	23–24
Worlds			20th	
Europeans			8th	
GP Finland			6th	
GP Skate America				WD
CS Finlandia Trophy		15th	WD	
CS Lombardia Trophy				WD
CS Nebelhorn Trophy			9th	WD
CS Golden Spin		WD	4th	
Bavarian Open		3rd		
Challenge Cup	6th	3rd	3rd	
Ice Challenge			2nd	
Lombardia			4th	
NRW Trophy		2nd		
National
Netherlands	1st	2nd	1st	
TBD = Assigned; WD = Withdrew; C = Cancelled

=== Pairs with Liubov Efimenko ===
International
Event	2018–19	2019–20
CS Nebelhorn Trophy		11th
Bavarian Open	7th	
Challenge Cup	4th	
National
Netherlands	1st	

=== Pairs with Rachel Epstein ===
International: Junior
Event	09–10	10–11	11–12	12–13
Junior Worlds		17th	17th	16th
JGP Austria			18th	
JGP Estonia			12th	
JGP Germany				WD
Bavarian Open		1st		
Challenge Cup			4th	
Ice Challenge		1st		
NRW Trophy	5th	1st	4th	7th
Warsaw Cup				8th
National
Netherlands	1st J		1st J	1st J
