= Nika Osipova =

Russian pair skater

Personal information
- Native name: Ника Кирилловна Осипова
- Full name: Nika Kirillovna Osipova
- Born: 2 February 2001 (age 25) St. Petersburg, Russia
- Height: 157 cm (5 ft 2 in)

Figure skating career
- Country: Netherlands
- Coach: Dmitry Kaplun, Aljona Savchenko
- Began skating: 2005

Nika Kirillovna Osipova (Russian: Ника Кирилловна Осипова; born 2 February 2001) is a Russian-born pair skater. Competing for the Netherlands with Dmitry Epstein, she is a two time Dutch national champion (2021, 2023). They made their competitive debut in February 2021.

Osipova formerly represented Russia with Aleksandr Galliamov as a junior during the 2016–2017 skating season. Together, they won the Volvo Open Cup in November 2016.

== Career ==
=== 2020–2021 season: Partnership with Epstein ===
After a good start on the first day at the 2021 International Challenge Cup to qualify for the 2021 World Championships, they didn't qualify due to a fall the next day.

== Programs ==
=== With Epstein ===
Season	Short program	Free skating
2022–2023	Exit Music (For a Film) by Radiohead	Prelude (Age of Heroes) by Balázs Havasi
2021–2022	Seven Nation Army performed by Postmodern Jukebox, Haley Reinhart	

== Competitive highlights ==
GP: Grand Prix; CS: Challenger Series

=== With Epstein for the Netherlands ===
International
Event	20–21	21–22	22–23
Worlds			20th
Europeans			8th
GP Finland			6th
CS Finlandia Trophy		15th	WD
CS Nebelhorn Trophy			9th
CS Golden Spin		WD	4th
Bavarian Open		3rd	
Challenge Cup	6th	3rd	3rd
Ice Challenge			2nd
Lombardia			4th
NRW Trophy		2nd	
National
Netherlands	1st	2nd	1st
TBD = Assigned; WD = Withdrew; C = Cancelled

=== With Galliamov for Russia ===
International
Event	2016–17
Volvo Open Cup	1st J
National
Russian Jr. Champ.	9th
Russian Cup Final	3rd J
J = Junior level
