= Haanappel =

Haanappel is a surname. Notable people with the surname include:

- Joan Haanappel (born 1940), Dutch figure skater and sports presenter
- Matthew Haanappel (born 1994), Australian Paralympic swimmer
