= Kyarha van Tiel =

Dutch figure skater (born 2000)

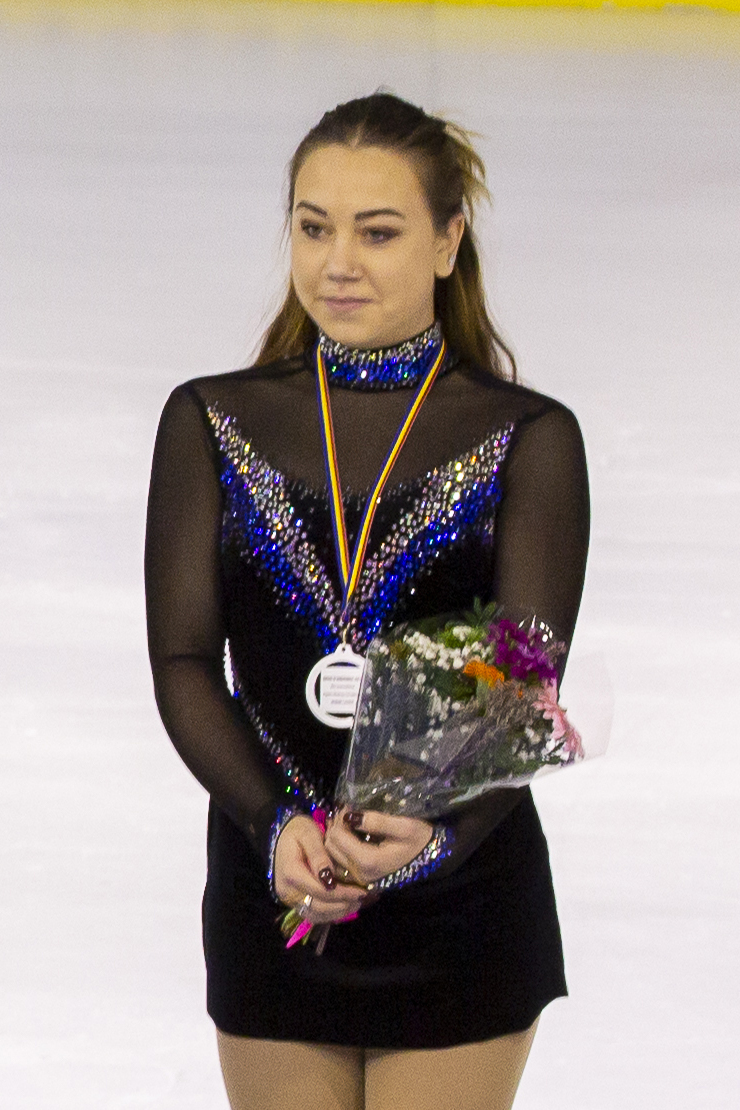
- van Tiel in 2019

Personal information
- Born: 17 May 2000 (age 26) Rotterdam, Netherlands
- Height: 1.50 m (4 ft 11 in)

Figure skating career
- Country: Netherlands
- Coach: Kevin van der Perren, Jenna McCorkell, Nathalie Oogjen
- Skating club: KAT The Hague
- Began skating: 2006
- Retired: October 17, 2020

Kyarha van Tiel (born 17 May 2000) is a Dutch retired figure skater. She is a two-time Open d'Andorra champion (2017, 2019). She competed in the final segment at the 2016 and 2018 World Junior Championships.

== Career ==
Van Tiel began skating at age six. She won the Dutch national ladies' title on the novice level in the 2013–2014 season. She made her junior international debut at an ISU Junior Grand Prix event in August 2014.

Van Tiel began the 2015–2016 season training under Astrid Tameling-Winkelman and Nathalie Oogjen in Dordrecht, Netherlands, before joining Kevin van der Perren, Jenna McCorkell, and Jérôme Blanchard in Liedekerke, Belgium. In March, she represented The Netherlands at the 2016 World Junior Championships in Debrecen, Hungary, where she qualified for the final segment. Ranked 17th in the short program and 20th in the free skate, she finished 18th overall.

Van Tiel also advanced to the free skate at the 2018 World Junior Championships in Sofia, Bulgaria, where she would finish 24th.

Van Tiel announced her retirement from figure skating on October 17, 2020.

== Programs ==
Season	Short program	Free skating
2018–2019	Sahara Nights by DJ Quincy Ortiz choreo by Adam Solya	Iron; Golden Age; Run Boy Run by Woodkid choreo by Adam Solya
2017–2018	Diem by Rodrigo y Gabriela choreo by Julie Marcotte	Iron; Golden Age; Run Boy Run by Woodkid choreo by Adam Solya
2015–2016	Diem by Rodrigo y Gabriela choreo by Julie Marcotte	Once Upon a Time in the West by Ennio Morricone choreo by Julie Marcotte
2014–2015	If I Could See You Again; River Flows in You by Yiruma choreo by Julie Marcotte	Halo Theme by Lindsey Stirling, William Joseph choreo by Susan Mason

== Competitive highlights ==
CS: Challenger Series; JGP: Junior Grand Prix

International
Event	13–14	14–15	15–16	16–17	17–18	18–19	19–20
Worlds						40th	
Europeans					26th	28th	
CS Golden Spin					11th	13th	13th
Bavarian Open							14th
Challenge Cup					17th	13th	21st
Denkova-Staviski						7th	
Open d'Andorra					1st		1st
Tallinn Trophy							15th
Volvo Open Cup					7th		
International: Junior
Junior Worlds			18th		24th		
JGP Austria			21st				
JGP France		15th					
JGP Lithuania						24th	
JGP Poland			17th				
JGP Russia				WD			
EYOF		15th					
Bavarian Open			11th				
Coupe Printemps	12th	2nd					
Challenge Cup		2nd					
NRW Trophy		17th	15th				
Open d'Andorra		3rd					
National
Dutch Champ.			1st J		2nd	2nd	3rd
