= Dutch Figure Skating Championships =

Recurring figure skating competition

- Status: Active
- Genre: National championships
- Frequency: Annual
- Venue: IJssportcentrum Tilburg
- Location: Tilburg
- Country: Netherlands
- Inaugurated: 1950
- Organizer: Royal Dutch Skating Federation

The Dutch Figure Skating Championships (Dutch: Nederlandse kampioenschappen kunstschaatsen) are an annual figure skating competition, organized by the Royal Dutch Skating Federation (Dutch: Koninklijke Nederlandsche Schaatsenrijders Bond; KNSB) to crown the national champions of the Netherlands. While skating competitions had been held in the Netherlands prior to 1950, official national championships were not recognized until 1950. Competitions in ice dance did not achieve championship status until 1956. For the first several years, the competition was held in The Hague. Since 2017, the Dutch Championships have been contested as part of the International Challenge Cup. The top Dutch competitors at this competition are recognized as the Dutch national champions.

Medals are awarded in men's singles, women's singles, pair skating, and ice dance at the senior and junior levels, although each discipline may not necessarily be held every year due to a lack of participants. Wouter Toledo holds the record for winning the most Dutch Championship titles in men's singles (with seven), Karen Venhuizen holds the record in women's singles (with nine), Daria Danilova and Michel Tsiba hold the record in pair skating (with three), and Marie-Louise and Xander Gijtenbeek hold the record in ice dance (with seven).

== History ==
Figure skating in the Netherlands has historically never held the same popularity as ice hockey and speed skating. A lack of training facilities, certified coaches, and funding from the Royal Dutch Skating Federation (KNSB) led to decades of poor turnout and relatively poor results from Dutch figure skaters. While skating competitions had been held in the Netherlands prior to 1950, official national championships were not recognized until 1950. Likewise, competitions in ice dance did not achieve championship status until 1956. In 1959, plans were made to build an artificial ice rink in Amsterdam, but they were scrapped when the funds could not be raised. Only after a Dutch skater won the World Speed Skating Championships in 1961 were the necessary funds allocated. "Without an artificial ice rink in the Netherlands, it is impossible to ... sustain international competitive skating," Mr. H.W. Vliegen, chairperson of the KNSB, said at the time.

Figure skaters had limited access to ice compared to hockey players, speed skaters, and recreational skaters. In 1981, there were 24 skating clubs comprising approximately 900 members, and only 20 ice rinks in the entirety of the Netherlands. Many of the Netherlands' most successful skaters were the children of Dutch emigrants who had moved to Canada or the United States. They lived and trained in North America, but returned to the Netherlands once a year to compete at the national championships. In some cases, this led to feelings of resentment among those who lived and trained in the Netherlands with fewer available resources and less access to ice. Media outlets often emphasized that these competitors lacked the ability to communicate in Dutch.

Since 2017, the Dutch Championships have been contested as part of the International Challenge Cup, the marquee figure skating competition of the Netherlands. The top Dutch competitors at this competition are recognized as the Dutch national champions. No championships were held in 2021 due to the COVID-19 pandemic. While the International Challenge Cup was held for several years in The Hague, the competition was relocated in 2023 to Tilburg.

== Senior medalists ==
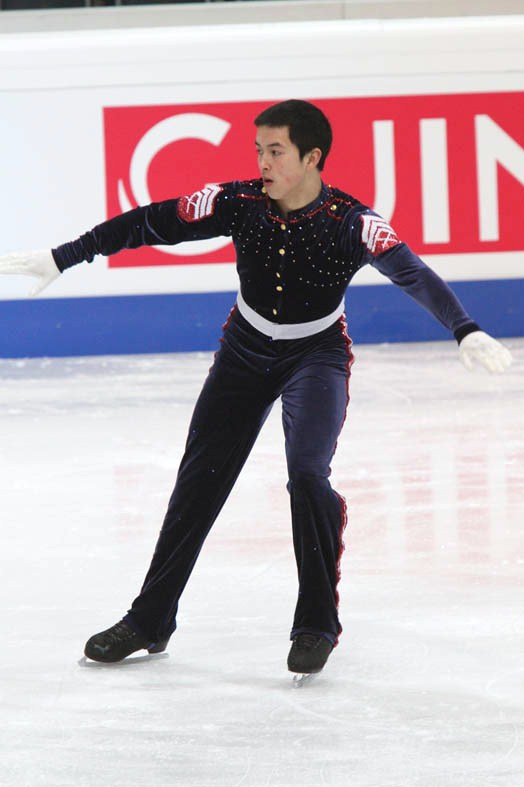
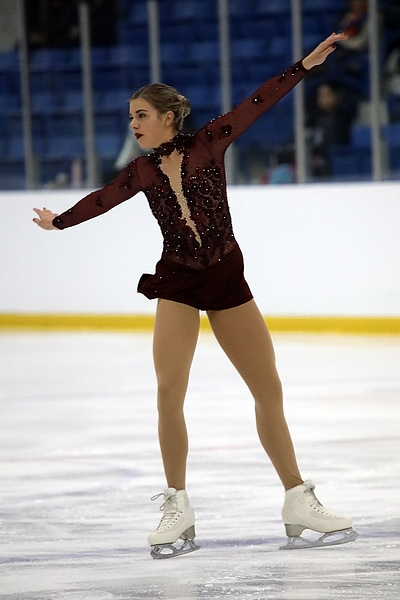
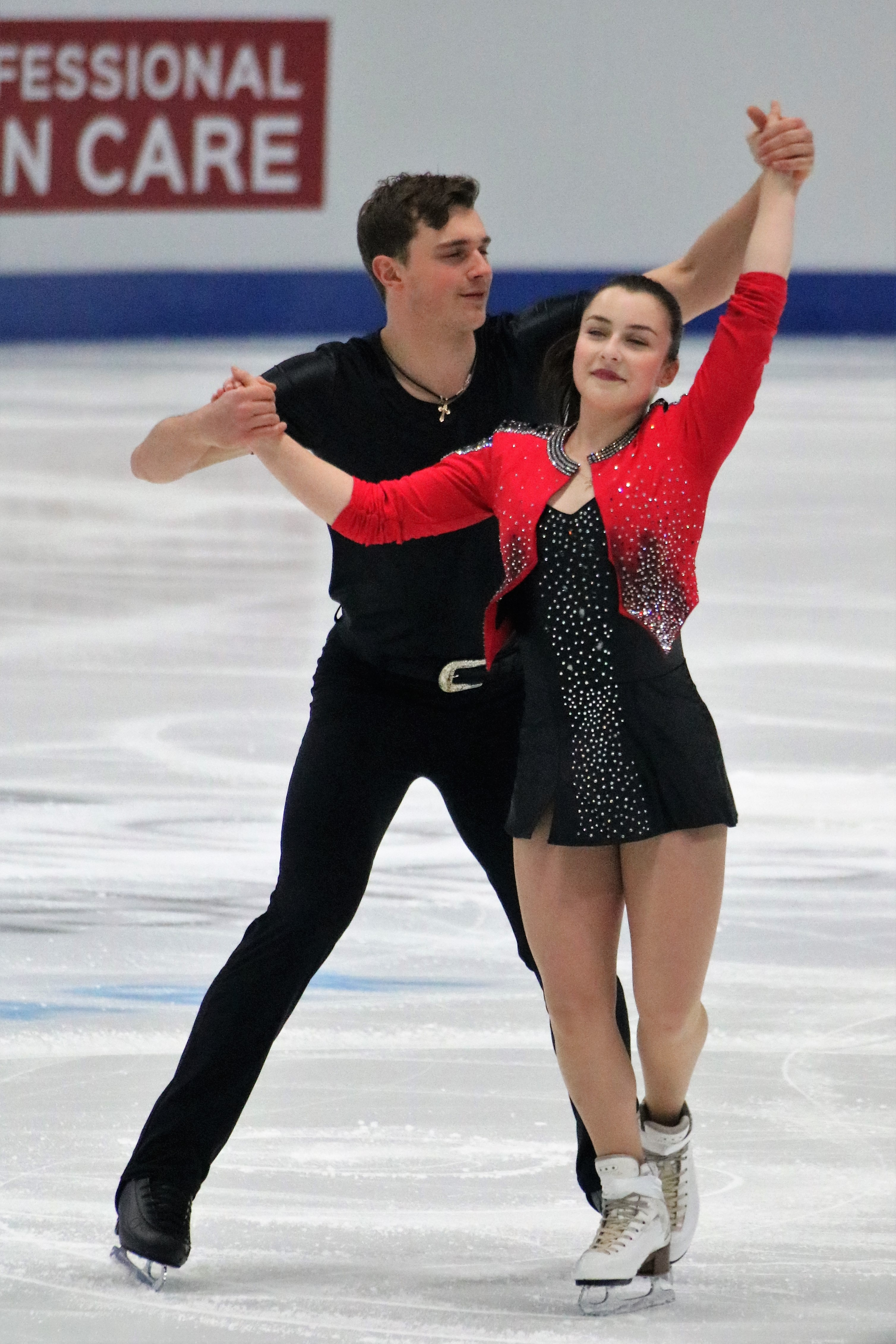
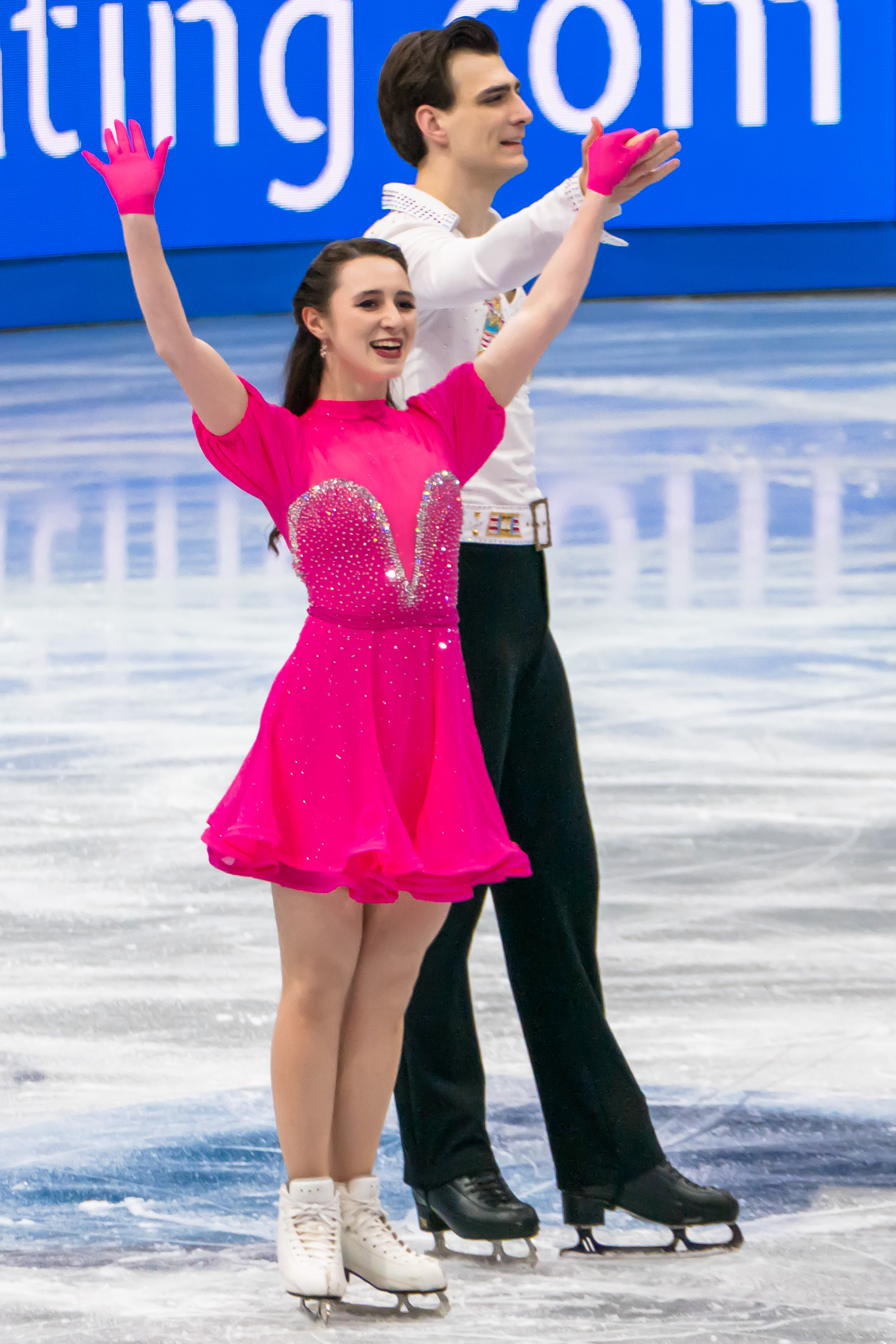
From left to right: Boyito Mulder, four-time Dutch champion in men's singles; Niki Wories, eight-time Dutch champion in women's singles; Daria Danilova and Michel Tsiba, two-time Dutch champions in pair skating; and Chelsea Verhaegh and Sherim van Geffen, three-time Dutch champions in ice dance

=== Men's singles ===
Senior men's event medalists
Year	Location	Gold	Silver	Bronze	Ref.
1950	The Hague	Paul Engelfriet	No other competitors		
1951	The Hague	Paul Engelfriet	No other competitors		
1952–57	The Hague	No men's competitors			
1958	The Hague	Wouter Toledo	No other competitors		
1959	The Hague	Wouter Toledo	No other competitors		
1960	The Hague	Wouter Toledo	No other competitors		
1961	The Hague	Wouter Toledo	No other competitors		
1962	The Hague	Wouter Toledo	No other competitors		
1963	The Hague	Wouter Toledo	Arnoud Hendriks	No other competitors	
1964	The Hague	Wouter Toledo	Arnoud Hendriks	No other competitors	
1965	The Hague	Arnoud Hendriks (Note: Arnoud Hendriks did not achieve the minimum required score to be named the Dutch champion.)	No other competitors		
1966	The Hague	Arnoud Hendriks	No other competitors		
1967	The Hague	Arnoud Hendriks	No other competitors		
1968	The Hague	Arnoud Hendriks	No other competitors		
1969	's-Hertogenbosch	Arnoud Hendriks	No other competitors		
1970	Heerenveen	Arnoud Hendriks	Rob Ouwerkerk	No other competitors	
1971	Eindhoven	Arnoud Hendriks	Rob Ouwerkerk	No other competitors	
1972	Groningen	Rob Ouwerkerk (Note: Neither of the competitors in the men's event achieved the minimum required score to be named the Dutch champion.)	Richard Pennekamp	No other competitors	
1973	Heerenveen	Rob Ouwerkerk	Richard Pennekamp	No other competitors	
1974	Amsterdam	Rob Ouwerkerk	No other competitors		
1975	The Hague	Rob Ouwerkerk (Note: Rob Ouwerkerk did not achieve the minimum required score to be named the Dutch champion.)	No other competitors		
1976–78	No men's competitors				
1979	Amsterdam	Gerard van Hattem	No other competitors		
1980	Groningen	Gerard van Hattem	Koos van Hattem	Arend Basile	
1981	Groningen	Gerard van Hattem	Koos van Hattem	No other competitors	
1982	Eindhoven	Ed van Campen	René van Campen	No other competitors	
1983	Heerenveen	Ed van Campen (Note: Ed van Campen did not achieve the minimum required score to be named the Dutch champion.)	No other competitors		
1984	Zoetermeer	Ed van Campen	René van Campen	No other competitors	
1985	's-Hertogenbosch	Ed van Campen	Alcuin Schulten	No other competitors	
1986	Eindhoven	Alcuin Schulten	Ed van Campen	Johan van der Neut	
1987	Zoetermeer	Alcuin Schulten	Johan van der Neut	No other competitors	
1988	Groningen	Alcuin Schulten	Alex Vrancken	Johan van der Neut	
1989	Geleen	Alcuin Schulten	Alex Vrancken	No other competitors	
1990	Groningen	Alcuin Schulten	Marcus Deen	Alex Vrancken	
1991	Amsterdam	Marcus Deen	Alcuin Schulten	No other competitors	
1992	The Hague	Alcuin Schulten	Marcus Deen	No other competitors	
1993	Heerenveen	Marcus Deen	No other competitors		
1994	Zoetermeer	Marcus Deen	No other competitors		
1995	Tilburg	Marcus Deen	Thomas Hopman	No other competitors	
1996	Zoetermeer	Marcus Deen	Thomas Hopman	No other competitors	
1997	Groningen	Marcus Deen	Thomas Hopman	No other competitors	
1998	Tilburg	Thomas Hopman	Marcus Deen	No other competitors	
1999	Tilburg	Maurice Lim	Thomas Hopman	No other competitors	
2000	Amsterdam	Maurice Lim	Michaël Lim	Thomas Hopman	
2001	Eindhoven	Thomas Hopman	No other competitors		
2002	Groningen	No men's competitors			
2003	Amsterdam	Thomas Hopman	No other competitors		
2004	Groningen	No men's competitors			
2005	The Hague	Ruben Reus	No other competitors		
2006	's-Hertogenbosch	Christian Gijtenbeek	Ruben Reus	No other competitors	
2007	Utrecht	Christian Gijtenbeek	No other competitors		
2008	Tilburg	Christian Gijtenbeek	No other competitors		
2009	Heerenveen	Boyito Mulder	Christian Gijtenbeek	No other competitors	
2010	Eindhoven	Boyito Mulder	No other competitors		
2011	Groningen	Boyito Mulder	Christian Gijtenbeek	No other competitors	
2012	Tilburg	Boyito Mulder	Florian Gostelie	Christian Gijtenbeek	
2013	Dordrecht	Florian Gostelie	Christian Gijtenbeek	No other competitors	
2014	Amsterdam	Thomas Kennes	Florian Gostelie	Christian Gijtenbeek	
2015	's-Hertogenbosch	Thomas Kennes	Michel Tsiba	Florian Gostelie	
2016	The Hague	Thomas Kennes	Michel Tsiba	Florian Gostelie	
2017	The Hague	Thomas Kennes	No other competitors		
2018	The Hague	Michel Tsiba	No other competitors		
2019	The Hague	Thomas Kennes	No other competitors		
2020	The Hague	Thomas Kennes	No other competitors		
2021	The Hague	Competition cancelled due to the COVID-19 pandemic			
2022	Tilburg	No men's competitors			
2023	Tilburg	Iwan van Hulst	No other competitors		
2024–26	Tilburg	No men's competitors			

=== Women's singles ===
Senior women's event medalists
Year	Location	Gold	Silver	Bronze	Ref.
1950	The Hague	Rietje van Erkel	Trees Cool	Lidy Stoppelman	
1951	The Hague	Lidy Stoppelman	Rietje van Erkel	Joan Haanappel	
1952	The Hague	Lidy Stoppelman	Joyce Mathyi	Nellie Maas	
1953	The Hague	Lidy Stoppelman	Nellie Maas	Joan Haanappel	
1954	The Hague	Nellie Maas	Joan Haanappel	Sjoukje Dijkstra	
1955	The Hague	Joan Haanappel	Sjoukje Dijkstra	Lenie Edelman	
1956	The Hague	Joan Haanappel	Sjoukje Dijkstra	Jeannine Ferir (Belgium)	
1957	The Hague	Joan Haanappel	Sjoukje Dijkstra	Jeannine Ferir (Belgium)	
1958	The Hague	Joan Haanappel	Sjoukje Dijkstra	Jeannine Ferir	
1959	The Hague	Sjoukje Dijkstra	Joan Haanappel	Jeannine Ferir	
1960	The Hague	Sjoukje Dijkstra	Joan Haanappel	Willy ten Hoopen	
1961	The Hague	Sjoukje Dijkstra	Truusje Geradts	Lilian van der Graaf	
1962	The Hague	Sjoukje Dijkstra	Truusje Geradts	Madeleine Hendriks	
1963	The Hague	Sjoukje Dijkstra	Truusje Geradts	Irene Verbeek	
1964	The Hague	Sjoukje Dijkstra	Madeleine Hendriks	Irene Verbeek	
1965	The Hague	Madeleine Hendriks (Note: None of the women achieved the minimum required score to be named the Dutch champion.)	Anneke Heijdt	Magdeleine Fesevur	
1966	The Hague	Anneke Heijdt	Astrid Feijertag	Madeleine Hendriks	
1967	The Hague	Anneke Heijdt	Rieneke Zendijk	Astrid Feiertag	
1968	The Hague	Anneke Heijdt	Lia Does	Rieneke Zendijk	
1969	's-Hertogenbosch	Lia Does	Yvonne Brink	Willy de Zoet	
1970	Heerenveen	Lia Does	Wang la Liu	Yvonne Brink	
1971	Eindhoven	Dianne de Leeuw	Lia Does	Sophie Verlaan	
1972	Groningen	Dianne de Leeuw	Lia Does	Sophie Verlaan	
1973	Heerenveen	Dianne de Leeuw	Sophie Verlaan	Annemarie Verlaan	
1974	Amsterdam	Dianne de Leeuw	Sophie Verlaan	Annemarie Verlaan	
1975	The Hague	Dianne de Leeuw	Annemarie Verlaan	Sophie Verlaan	
1976	The Hague	Dianne de Leeuw	Annemarie Verlaan	Sophie Verlaan	
1977	Amsterdam	Annemarie Verlaan	Sophie Verlaan	Rudina Pasveer	
1978	Tilburg	Astrid Jansen in de Wal	Rudina Pasveer	Bibiane Pruyn	
1979	Amsterdam	Astrid Jansen in de Wal	Rudina Pasveer	Herma van der Horst	
1980	Groningen	Astrid Jansen in de Wal	Rudina Pasveer	Li Scha Wang	
1981	Groningen	Rudina Pasveer	Li Scha Wang	Margo van Dijk	
1982	Eindhoven	Ingrid Aalders	Li Scha Wang	Roslund van Horn	
1983	Heerenveen	Li Scha Wang	Rudina Pasveer	Margo van Dijk	
1984	Zoetermeer	Li Scha Wang	Tjin Li Wang	Margo van Dijk	
1985	's-Hertogenbosch	Tjin Li Wang	Barbara van den Hoogen	Li Scha Wang	
1986	Eindhoven	Li Scha Wang	Magdi Stolcenberger	Tjin Li Wang	
1987	Zoetermeer	Li Scha Wang	Jeltje Schulten	Astrid Winkelman	
1988	Groningen	Astrid Winkelman	Jeltje Schulten	Marion Krijgsman	
1989	Geleen	Jeltje Schulten	Marion Krijgsman	Daniëlla Roymans	
1990	Groningen	Astrid Winkelman	Marion Krijgsman	Jeltje Schulten	
1991	Amsterdam	Marion Krijgsman	Monique van der Velden	Jeltje Schulten	
1992	The Hague	Marion Krijgsman	Connie Stuiver	Monique van der Velden	
1993	Heerenveen	Monique van der Velden	Marion Krijgsman	Nanda van den Berg	
1994	Zoetermeer	Monique van der Velden	Marion Krijgsman	No other competitors	
1995	Tilburg	Monique van der Velden	Georgina de Wit	Haya Leenards	
1996	Zoetermeer	Georgina de Wit	Selma Duijn	Haya Leenards	
1997	Groningen	Selma Duijn	Georgina de Wit	Jessica Lim	
1998	Tilburg	Marion Krijgsman	Jessica Lim	Selma Duijn	
1999	Tilburg	Marion Krijgsman	Karin Janssens	Jessica Lim	
2000	Amsterdam	Karen Venhuizen	Marion Krijgsman	Jessica Lim	
2001	Eindhoven	Karen Venhuizen	Marion Krijgsman	Angelika Naaktgeboren	
2002	Groningen	Karen Venhuizen	Martine Zuiderwijk	Sylvana Herrero	
2003	Amsterdam	Karen Venhuizen	Martine Zuiderwijk	Joëlle Bastiaans	
2004	Groningen	Karen Venhuizen	Joëlle Bastiaans	Martine Zuiderwijk	
2005	The Hague	Karen Venhuizen	Martine Zuiderwijk	Sharon Resseler	
2006	's-Hertogenbosch	Karen Venhuizen	Martine Zuiderwijk	Sharon Resseler	
2007	Utrecht	Karen Venhuizen	Jacqueline Voll	Sharon Resseler	
2008	Tilburg	Karen Venhuizen	Eva Lim	Jacqueline Voll	
2009	Heerenveen	Manouk Gijsman	Eva Lim	Jacqueline Voll	
2010	Eindhoven	Manouk Gijsman	Eva Lim	Nathalie Klaassen	
2011	Groningen	Joyce den Hollander	Manouk Gijsman	Manon van Huijgevoort	
2012	Tilburg	Manouk Gijsman	Eva Lim	Michelle Couwenberg	
2013	Dordrecht	Michelle Couwenberg	Kim Bell	Joyce den Hollander	
2014	Amsterdam	Eva Lim	Niki Wories	Mila Morelissen	
2015	's-Hertogenbosch	Niki Wories	Mila Morelissen	Kim Bell	
2016	The Hague	Niki Wories	Mila Morelissen	Nicolien van Beek	
2017	The Hague	Niki Wories	No other competitors		
2018	The Hague	Niki Wories	Kyarha van Tiel	No other competitors	
2019	The Hague	Niki Wories	Kyarha van Tiel	No other competitors	
2020	The Hague	Niki Wories	Lenne van Gorp	Kyarha van Tiel	
2021	The Hague	Competition cancelled due to the COVID-19 pandemic			
2022	Tilburg	Lindsay van Zundert	Niki Wories	No other competitors	
2023	Tilburg	Lindsay van Zundert	No other competitors		
2024	Tilburg	No women's competitors			
2025	Tilburg	Niki Wories	Saskia Oudejans	Jolanda Vos	
2026	Tilburg	Niki Wories	Jolanda Vos	Saskia Oudejans	

=== Pairs ===
Senior pairs' event medalists
Year	Location	Gold	Silver	Bronze	Ref.
No pairs competitors prior to 1994
1994	Zoetermeer	Jeltje Schulten; Alcuin Schulten	No other competitors		
1995	Tilburg	Jeltje Schulten; Alcuin Schulten	No other competitors		
1996	Zoetermeer	Jeltje Schulten; Alcuin Schulten	No other competitors		
1997–2018	No pairs competitors				
2019	The Hague	Liubov Efimenko; Dmitry Epstein	No other competitors		
2020	The Hague	Daria Danilova; Michel Tsiba	No other competitors		
2021	The Hague	Competition cancelled due to the COVID-19 pandemic			
2022	Tilburg	Daria Danilova; Michel Tsiba	Nika Osipova; Dmitry Epstein	No other competitors	
2023	Tilburg	Nika Osipova; Dmitry Epstein	Daria Danilova; Michel Tsiba	No other competitors	
2024	Tilburg	No pairs competitors			
2025	Tilburg	Daria Danilova; Michel Tsiba	No other competitors		
2026	Tilburg	No pairs competitors			

=== Ice dance ===
Although competitions in ice dance were held concurrently with the Dutch Figure Skating Championships prior to 1956, the ice dance event was not elevated to championship status until 1956.

Senior ice dance event medalists
Year	Location	Gold	Silver	Bronze	Ref.
1956	The Hague	Catharina Odink; Jacobus Odink	Kitty van der Muysenberg; Philip van der Mast	No other competitors	
1957	The Hague	Catharina Odink; Jacobus Odink	Corrie van Rossum; Anton Knaap	No other competitors	
1958	The Hague	Catharina Odink; Jacobus Odink	Corrie van Rossum; Anton Knaap	No other competitors	
1959	The Hague	Catharina Odink; Jacobus Odink	Corrie van Rossum; Anton Knaap	Agatha Ruygrok; Kees Stolze	
1960	The Hague	Catharina Odink; Jacobus Odink	Jopie Wolff; Nico Wolff	No other competitors	
1961	The Hague	Catharina Odink; Jacobus Odink	Jopie Wolff; Nico Wolff	Truusje Geradts; Wouter Toledo	
1962	The Hague	Jopie Wolff; Nico Wolff	Catharina Odink; Jacobus Odink	No other competitors	
1963	The Hague	Jopie Wolff; Nico Wolff	Truusje Geradts; Ronald du Burck	No other competitors	
1964	The Hague	Jopie Wolff; Nico Wolff	Truusje Geradts; Ronald du Burck	No other competitors	
1965	The Hague	Truusje Geradts; Ronald du Burck	No other competitors		
1966	The Hague	Truusje Geradts; Ronald du Burck	No other competitors		
1967	The Hague	Truusje Geradts; Ronald du Burck	No other competitors		
1968–87	No ice dance competitors				
1988	Groningen	Joanne van Leeuwen; Eerde van Leeuwen	Wil Visser; Feike Neef	No other competitors	
1989	Geleen	Joanne van Leeuwen; Eerde van Leeuwen	No other competitors		
1990	Groningen	Joanne van Leeuwen; Eerde van Leeuwen	No other competitors		
1991	Amsterdam	Joanne van Leeuwen; Eerde van Leeuwen	Marjo 't Hart; Hans 't Hart	No other competitors	
1992	The Hague	Joanne van Leeuwen; Eerde van Leeuwen	Marjo 't Hart; Hans 't Hart	No other competitors	
1993	Heerenveen	Chouw Lan Chan; Arthur Kosten	Marjo 't Hart; Hans 't Hart	No other competitors	
1994	Zoetermeer	Anita Chaudhuri; Hans 't Hart	No other competitors		
1995	Tilburg	Anita Chaudhuri; Hans 't Hart	No other competitors		
1996–99	No ice dance competitors				
2000	Amsterdam	Marie-Louise Gijtenbeek; Xander Gijtenbeek	No other competitors		
2001	Eindhoven	Marie-Louise Gijtenbeek; Xander Gijtenbeek	No other competitors		
2002	Groningen	Marie-Louise Gijtenbeek; Xander Gijtenbeek	No other competitors		
2003	Amsterdam	Marie-Louise Gijtenbeek; Xander Gijtenbeek	No other competitors		
2004	Groningen	Marie-Louise Gijtenbeek; Xander Gijtenbeek	No other competitors		
2005	The Hague	Marie-Louise Gijtenbeek; Xander Gijtenbeek	No other competitors		
2006	's-Hertogenbosch	Marie-Louise Gijtenbeek; Xander Gijtenbeek	No other competitors		
2007–19	No ice dance competitors				
2020	The Hague	Chelsea Verhaegh; Sherim van Geffen	No other competitors		
2021	The Hague	Competition cancelled due to the COVID-19 pandemic			
2022	Tilburg	Hanna Jakucs; Alessio Galli	No other competitors		
2023	Tilburg	Chelsea Verhaegh; Sherim van Geffen	Hanna Jakucs; Alessio Galli	No other competitors	
2024	Tilburg	Hanna Jakucs; Alessio Galli	Chelsea Verhaegh; Sherim van Geffen	No other competitors	
2025	Tilburg	Hanna Jakucs; Alessio Galli	Chelsea Verhaegh; Sherim van Geffen	No other competitors	
2026	Tilburg	Chelsea Verhaegh; Sherim van Geffen	No other competitors		

== Junior medalists ==
=== Men's singles ===
Junior men's event medalists
Year	Location	Gold	Silver	Bronze	Ref.
1973	Heerenveen	No junior men's competitors			
1974	Amsterdam	No junior men's competitors			
1975	The Hague	Gerard van Hattem (Note: Gerard van Hattem did not achieve the minimum required score to be named the Dutch junior champion.)	No other competitors		
1976	The Hague	Gerard van Hattem	No other competitors		
1977	Amsterdam	Eddy Hendrix	Gerard van Hattem	Koos van Hattem	
1978	Tilburg	Eddy Hendrix	Gerard van Hattem	Koos van Hattem	
1979	Amsterdam	Koos van Hattem	No other competitors		
1980–82	No junior men's competitors				
1983	Heerenveen	Alex Vrancken (Note: Alex Vrancken did not achieve the minimum required score to be named the Dutch junior champion.)	No other competitors		
1984	Zoetermeer	Alcuin Schulten	Johan van der Neut	Alex Vrancken	
1985	's-Hertogenbosch	Johan van der Neut	Alex Vrancken	No other competitors	
1986	Eindhoven	No junior men's competitors			
1987	Zoetermeer	Alex Vrancken	No other competitors		
1988	Groningen	No junior men's competitors			
1989	Geleen	Marcus Deen	Martijn Nas	No other competitors	
1990	Groningen	Martijn Nas	No other competitors		
1991	Amsterdam	Lauren Geurts	No other competitors		
1992	The Hague	Edwin Visser	Lauren Geurts	No other competitors	
1993	Heerenveen	No junior men's competitors			
1994	Zoetermeer	Thomas Hopman	No other competitors		
1995	Tilburg	Maurice Lim	No other competitors		
1996	Zoetermeer	Maurice Lim	No other competitors		
1997	Gronigen	Maurice Lim	Michael Lim	No other competitors	
1998	Tilburg	Maurice Lim	Michael Lim	No other competitors	
1999–2001	No junior men's competitors				
2002	Groningen	No junior men's competitors			
2003	Amsterdam	Ruben Reus	No other competitors		
2004	Groningen	Ruben Reus	No other competitors		
2005–07	No junior men's competitors				
2008	Tilburg	Boyito Mulder	No other competitors		
2009	Heerenveen	Ben Koenderink	Florian Gostelie	No other competitors	
2010	Eindhoven	Thomas Kennes	Florian Gostelie	Toby Connock	
2011	Groningen	No junior men's competitors			
2012	Tilburg	Thomas Kennes	No other competitors		
2013	Dordrecht	Thomas Kennes	Sebastian Mellab	Michel Tsiba	
2014	Amsterdam	Michel Tsiba	Sebastian Mellab	No other competitors	
2015	's-Hertogenbosch	Erik Hruszowy	Marco van den Hoed	No other competitors	
2016	The Hague	Erik Hruszowy	Marco van den Hoed	No other competitors	
2017	The Hague	Michel Tsiba	No other competitors		
2018–19	The Hague	No junior men's competitors			
2020	The Hague	Didier Dijkstra	No other competitors		
2021	The Hague	Competition cancelled due to the COVID-19 pandemic			
No junior men's competitors since 2020

=== Women's singles ===
Junior women's event medalists
Year	Location	Gold	Silver	Bronze	Ref.
1973	Heerenveen	Corrie Verlaan	Ilona Blokpoel	Bibiane Pruyn	
1974	Amsterdam	Herma van der Horst	Monique Verlaan	Marieke Mortier	
1975	The Hague	Monique Verlaan	Rudina Pasveer	Petra Verburgt	
1976	The Hague	Karen Zandvoort	Petra Verburgt	Marieke Mortier	
1977	Amsterdam	Sylvia Holtes	Li Scha Wang	Monique Wever	
1978	Tilburg	Li Scha Wang	Janna Bazuin	Ingrid Aalders	
1979	Amsterdam	Margo van Dijk	Marie-Louise van de Kruk	Veronie Boumans	
1980	Groningen	Micaella Schilleroord	Tjin Li Wang	Veronie Boumans	
1981	Groningen	Tjin Li Wang	Barbara van den Hoogen	Veronie Boumans	
1982	Eindhoven	Barbara van den Hoogen	Liselotte Schreppers	Hermi Otteman	
1983	Heerenveen	Liselotte Schreppers	Angelique Heyers	Renate Bakker	
1984	Zoetermeer	Angelique Heyers	Monique Schippers	Hermi Otteman	
1985	's-Hertogenbosch	Mireille van Bogget	Claudia Vincken	Jeltje Schulten	
1986	Eindhoven	Astrid Winkelman	Claudia Vincken	Daniëlla Roymans	
1987	Zoetermeer	Daniëlle Roymans	Heidi Mennen	Monique van der Velden	
1988	Groningen	Linda van Andel	Monique van der Velden	Angelique Visser	
1989	Geleen	Connie Stuiver	Monique van der Velden	Chou Lan Can	
1990	Groningen	Nancy Broeders	Chantal van Son	Nanda van de Berg	
1991	Amsterdam	Charmaine Marechal	Lieke van de Ark	Katja Kossmayer	
1992	The Hague	Katja Kossmayer	Lieke van de Ark	Wendy Ammerlaan	
1993	Heerenveen	Haya Leenards	Debby Roem	Liliana Tom	
1994	Zoetermeer	Melanie Carrington	Jessica Lim	Selma Duijn	
1995	Tilburg	Sylvana Herrero	Kim Rolloos	Sibel Ertekin	
1996	Zoetermeer	Martine Zuiderwijk	Sibel Ertekin	Ariënne van Heusden	
1997	Gronigen	Karin Janssens	Claire Erkelens	Martine Zuiderwijk	
1998	Tilburg	Karen Venhuizen	Claire Erkelens	Martine Zuiderwijk	
1999	Tilburg	Martine Zuiderwijk	Angelika Naaktgeboren	Claire Erkelens	
2000	Amsterdam	Angelika Naaktgeboren	Claire Muyselaar	Joëlle Bastiaans	
2001	Eindhoven	Joëlle Bastiaans	Emmie de Rooy	Claire Muyselaar	
2002	Groningen	Emmie de Rooy	Marijn Stok	Elisabeth van der Elst	
2003	Amsterdam	Kim van Bergenhenegouwen	Kyra Vancrayelynghe	Chamera Chan Jong Chu	
2004	Groningen	Kim van Bergenhenegouwen	Sharon Resseler	Jacqueline Voll	
2005	The Hague	Nathalie van Uffelen	Sanne in ’t Hof	Isabelle van Beek	
2006	's-Hertogenbosch	Christel de Haan	Eva Lim	Nathalie van Uffelen	
2007	Utrecht	Eva Lim	Jamie van Besouw	Nathalie van Uffelen	
2008	Tilburg	Manouk Gijsman	Michelle Couwenberg	Jamie van Besouw	
2009	Heerenveen	Manouk van Huijgevoort	Marylie Jong	Kim Bell	
2010	Eindhoven	Joyce den Hollander	Michelle Couwenberg	Mila Morelissen	
2011	Groningen	Laura Ponzio	Michelle Couwenberg	Kim Bell	
2012	Tilburg	Kim Bell	Mila Morelissen	Anne-Sophie Goossens	
2013	Dordrecht	Niki Wories	Anne-Sophie Goossens	Janne van den Biggelaar	
2014	Amsterdam	Anne-Sophie Goossens	Rozemarijn Goossens	Chanel den Olden	
2015	's-Hertogenbosch	Janne van den Biggelaar	Daisy Vreenegoor	Lena Slagter	
2016	The Hague	Kyarha van Tiel	Linden van Bemmel	Daya Aerts	
2017	The Hague	Daisy Vreenegoor	Caya Scheepens	Linden van Bemmel	
2018	The Hague	Caya Scheepens	Lenne van Gorp	Sophie Bijkerk	
2019	The Hague	Lindsay van Zundert	Lenne van Gorp	Caya Scheepens	
2020	The Hague	Lindsay van Zundert	Mikai van Ommeren	Dani Loonstra	
2021	The Hague	Competition cancelled due to the COVID-19 pandemic			
2022	The Hague	Dani Loonstra	Julia van Dijk	Isabella Smit	
2023	Tilburg	Jolanda Vos	Emilia Soloukhin	Nazomi van Bergen Bravenboer	
2024	Tilburg	Emilia Soloukhin	Jolanda Vos	Naomi Wessels	
2025	Tilburg	Lucca Dijkhuizen	Roos Harkema	Kahlan Gooijer	
2026	Tilburg	Lucca Dijkhuizen	Roos Harkema	No other competitors	

=== Pairs ===
Junior pairs' event medalists
Year	Location	Gold	Silver	Bronze	Ref.
No junior pairs competitions prior to 1994
1994	Zoetermeer	Jessica Lim; Maurice Lim	No other competitors		
1995	Tilburg	Jessica Lim; Maurice Lim	No other competitors		
1996	Zoetermeer	Jessica Lim; Maurice Lim	No other competitors		
1997–2008	No junior pairs competitors				
2009	Heerenveen	Marylie de Jong; Ben Koenderink	No other competitors		
2010	Eindhoven	Rachel Epstein; Dmitry Epstein	No other competitors		
2011	Groningen	Rachel Epstein; Dmitry Epstein	No other competitors		
2012	Tilburg	Rachel Epstein; Dmitry Epstein	No other competitors		
2013	Dordrecht	Rachel Epstein; Dmitry Epstein	No other competitors		
2014–18	No junior pairs competitors				
2019	The Hague	Daria Danilova; Michel Tsiba	No other competitors		
No junior pairs competitors since 2019

=== Ice dance ===
Junior ice dance event medalists
Year	Location	Gold	Silver	Bronze	Ref.
1989	Geleen	Marjo 't Hart; Hans 't Hart	No other competitors		
1990	Groningen	Marjo 't Hart; Hans 't Hart	No other competitors		
1991	Amsterdam	No junior ice dance competitors			
1992	The Hague	Anita Chaudhuri; Robert Duyverman	Chouw Lan Chan; Arthur Kosten	No other competitors	
1993	Heerenveen	Anita Chaudhuri; Robert Duyverman	No other competitors		
1994–95	No junior ice dance competitors				
1996	Zoetermeer	Kim Rolloos; Edwin Visser	No other competitors		
1997	Gronigen	Kim Rolloos; Edwin Visser	No other competitors		
1998	Tilburg	Kim Rolloos; Edwin Visser	Marie-Louise Gijtenbeek; Xander Gijtenbeek	No other competitors	
1999	Tilburg	Lisette Denkers; Maurice Hamerslag	No other competitors		
2000–05	No junior ice dance competitors				
2006	's-Hertogenbosch	Jill Bakker; Jan Hubner	No other competitors		
2007	Utrecht	Jill Bakker; Jan Hubner	No other competitors		
2008–11	No junior ice dance competitors				
2012	Tilburg	Auvikki de Boon; Tanner White	No other competitors		
No junior ice dance competitors since 2012

== Records ==
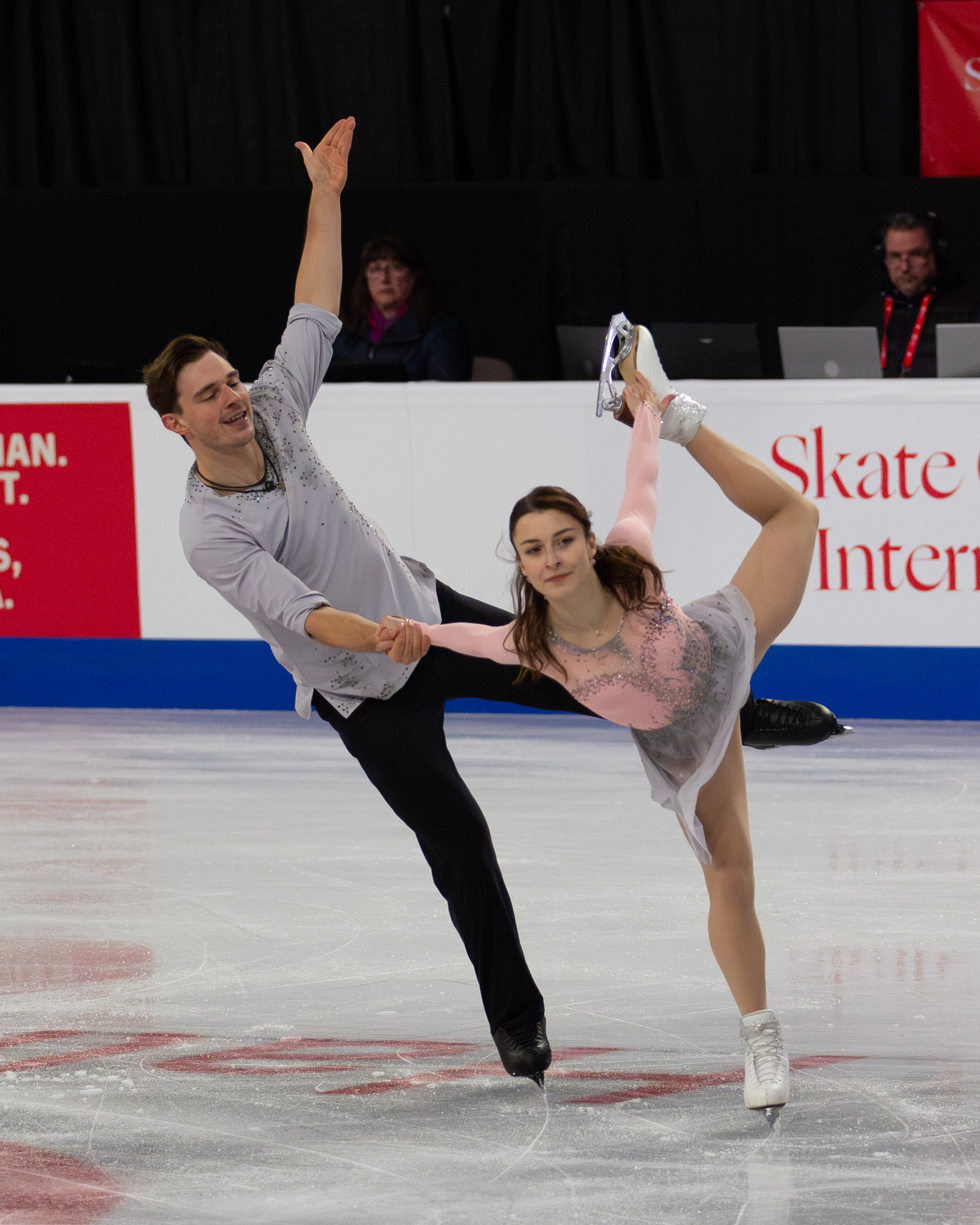
Daria Danilova and Michel Tsiba have won three Dutch Championship titles in pair skating.

Records
Discipline	Most championship titles			
Discipline	Skater(s)	No.	Years	Ref.
Men's singles	Wouter Toledo	7	1958–64	
Women's singles	Karen Venhuizen	9	2000–08	
Pairs	Daria Danilova; Michel Tsiba	3	2020; 2022; 2025	
Ice dance	Marie-Louise Gijtenbeek; Xander Gijtenbeek	7	2000–06	
