= Steven Jansen =

Steven Jansen may refer to:

- Steve Jansen (musician, born 1959), English musician, composer and record producer
- Steve Jansen (soccer) (born 1967), Canadian former soccer player
- Steven Jansen (DJ), part of the duo Lucas & Steve
