= Astrid Jansen =

Dutch figure skater

Astrid Jansen in de Wal
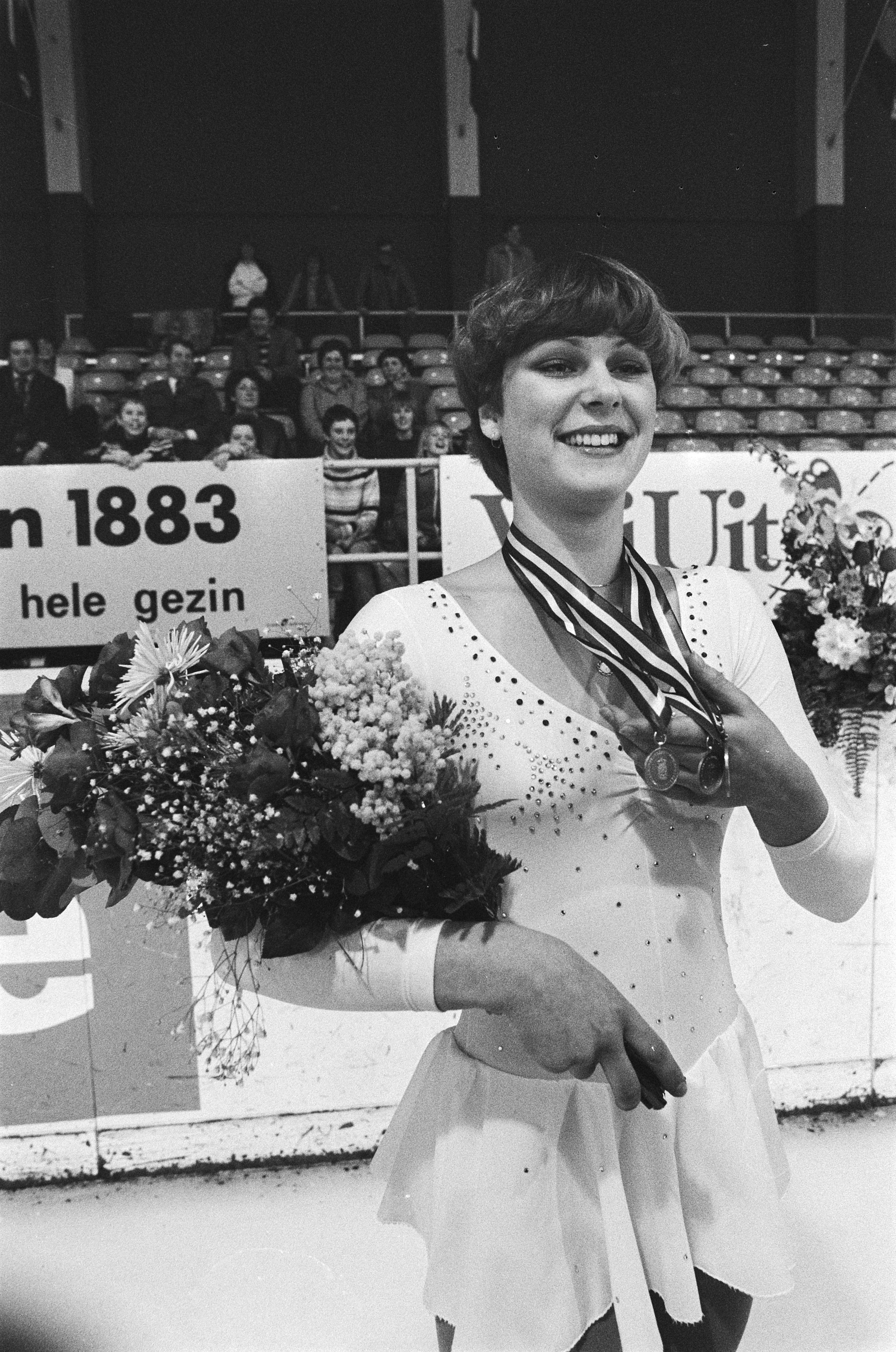
- Astrid Jansen in de Wal at the 1979 Dutch Figure Skating Championships

Personal information
- Other names: Astrid Shrubb

Figure skating career
- Country: Netherlands
- Coach: Joan Haanappel; Neil Carpenter
- Retired: c. 1980

Astrid Jansen in de Wal, later surname Shrubb, is a Dutch former competitive figure skater. She is a three-time Dutch national champion and competed at five ISU Championships.

== Personal life ==
Astrid Jansen in de Wal is a dual citizen of Canada and the Netherlands. She is the sister of Canadian soccer player Steve Jansen.

== Career ==
Early in her career, Jansen trained in Pointe-Claire, Quebec, and at the Hamilton-Stoney Creek Skating Club in Hamilton, Ontario. Encouraged by a coach, Neil Carpenter, she decided to represent the Netherlands and moved to that country to train under Joan Haanappel.

Jansen won the first of her three consecutive Dutch national titles in the 1977–78 season. A competitor at five ISU Championships, she finished 17th at the 1978 Europeans in Strasbourg, France; 18th at the 1978 Worlds in Ottawa, Ontario, Canada; 20th at the 1979 Europeans in Zagreb, Yugoslavia; 23rd at the 1979 Worlds in Vienna, Austria; and 18th at the 1980 Europeans in Gothenburg, Sweden.

After retiring from competition, Jansen became a skating coach with a focus on spins. She joined Yuna Kim's coaching team in 2007.

== Competitive highlights ==
International
Event	1977–78	1978–79	1979–80
World Championships	18th	23rd	
European Championships	17th	20th	18th
National
Dutch Championships	1st	1st	1st
