= Pasveer =

Pasveer is a Dutch surname. Notable people with the surname include:

- Kathinka Pasveer (born 1959), Dutch flautist
- Remko Pasveer (born 1983), Dutch footballer
- Rudina Pasveer (born in the 1960s), Dutch figure skater
