= Rietje van Erkel =

Dutch figure skater

Personal information
- Born: February 26, 1933
- Died: 11 June 2017 (aged 84)

Figure skating career
- Country: Netherlands

Rietje van Erkel (26 February 1933 – 11 June 2017) was a Dutch figure skater.

== Results ==
Event	1950	1951
European Championships		17th
Dutch Championships	1st	2nd

== References, external links ==
- results
