= Marcus Deen =

Dutch figure skater

Personal information
- Born: 5 August 1973 (age 52) Zoetermeer

Figure skating career
- Country: Netherlands

Marcus Deen (born 5 August 1973) is a Dutch former figure skater.

== Results ==
Event	1989-90	1990-91	1991-92	1992-93	1993-94	1994-95	1995-96	1996-97	1997-98
World Championships				37th					
European Championships						30th	30th		
Dutch Championships	2nd	1st	2nd	1st	1st	1st	1st	1st	2nd
Piruetten				20th	23rd		8th		
