= Alcuin Schulten =

Dutch figure skater (born 1972)

Figure skating career
- Country: Netherlands; Greece

Alcuin Schulten (born 1972) is a Dutch former figure skater. He competed for the Netherlands in men's singles and in pair skating with his sister Jeltje Schulten. He also danced with the Greek Elaine Asakanis for several years. After his skating career, he completed his dental studies at Radboud University Nijmegen in 1996 and specialized as an orthodontist with a master's degree at Harvard University in 2002. He has published several scientific papers.

== Results ==
=== Single skating for the Netherlands ===
International
Event	1985	1986	1987	1988	1989	1990	1991	1992
World Champ.						27th		
European Champ.						18th		22nd
World Junior Champ.			16th	14th	17th			
National
Dutch Champ.	2nd	1st	1st	1st	1st	1st	2nd	1st

=== Pairs with Jeltje Schulten for the Netherlands ===
International
Event	1995	1996
European Championships	15th	15th
