= Ed van Campen =

Dutch figure skater

Figure skating career
- Country: Netherlands
- Discipline: Men's singles

Edward van Campen, also spelled VanCampen (born 1960, Los Angeles), is a former Dutch figure skater and a three-time Dutch champion.

== Career ==
Van Campen started figure skating unusually late, at age 16. During his career, he was a three-time Dutch champion in 1982, 1984, and 1985. In 1981, he was not given the Dutch title, as he was the only competitor. He competed at the 1982 European Championships and did unexpectedly well, placing 18th; the Dutch Ice Skating Association had not originally planned to send him to the 1982 World Championships but did so after this performance.

In 1983, van Campen was recovering from a hip fracture sustained the previous season that made it difficult for him to make triple jumps. He won the Dutch championships but was not awarded the title. In response to criticism that the Dutch Ice Skating Association should not spend money on him after he had very poor results that season, van Campen said that they did not financially support him, and that he had to borrow the airfare to compete at the 1983 International Challenge Cup from his family.

Van Campen said he finished his competitive career because the Dutch Ice Skating Association made him feel that he was "too old" to continue competing. After retiring from competitive skating, he had a professional career skating with the Ice Capades and coaching, and he has participated in adult figure skating.

== Personal life ==
Van Campen had a twin brother, Renè, who also figure skated. Renè was diagnosed with HIV/AIDS in 1988 and died in 1989; van Campen returned to skating afterward after a counselor asked him to consider what activities made him happiest. At the 2006 Gay Games, van Campen, who is gay, performed a tribute to his brother with a panel he designed for the NAMES Project AIDS Memorial Quilt.

He also participated in the 1998 Gay Games, where the figure skating event was cancelled due to a conflict with the International Skating Union, which did not recognize same-sex paired events. van Campen and other skaters held a public performance despite this.

After his competitive career, he moved back to the United States.

== Results ==
International
| Event | 1982 | 1983 | 1984 | 1985 | 1986 |
|---|---|---|---|---|---|
| World Championships | 29th | | | | |
| European Championships | 18th | | 20th | 19th | |
National
| Dutch Championships | 1st | 1st (Note: While van Campen finished in first place at the 1983 Dutch Championships, he was not named the Dutch Champion.) | 1st | 1st | 2nd |
