= Boyito Mulder =

Dutch figure skater

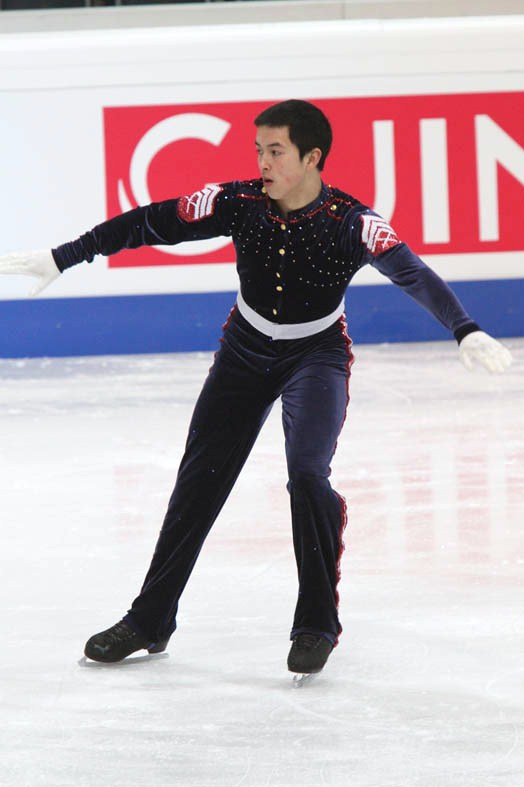

Personal information
- Born: 23 August 1991 (age 35) Groningen, Netherlands
- Height: 1.80 m (5 ft 11 in)

Figure skating career
- Country: Netherlands
- Coach: Susan Kraan-Akkerman; Neil Carpenter
- Skating club: Kunstrij Club Groningen
- Began skating: 1998

Boyito Mulder (born 23 August 1991) is a Dutch former competitive figure skater. He is a four-time Dutch national senior champion.

== Programs ==
Season	Short program	Free skating
2010–2012	Singin' in the Rain	The Rock by Nick Glennie-Smith, Hans Zimmer
2009–2010	Jurassic Park by John Williams	The Three Musketeers by Michael Kamen
2007–2009	Bolero	Alexander by Vangelis

== Results ==
Results
Event	2007–08	2008–09	2009–10	2010–11	2011–12
Europeans		36th	32nd	36th	
Bavarian Open					WD
Challenge Cup		14th J.			
Cup of Nice					WD
Merano Cup		1st J.	20th		
Nebelhorn					19th
NRW Trophy		17th	18th		
International: Junior
Junior Worlds	45th	39th	45th	31st	
JGP Germany			23rd		
JGP Italy		22nd			
JGP Spain		26th			
JGP Turkey			20th		
National
Dutch Champ.	1st J.	1st	1st	1st	1st
