= Eva Lim =

Dutch figure skater

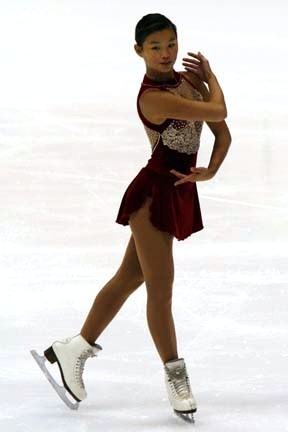
- Eva Lim in 2007

Personal information
- Born: July 10, 1992 (age 33) Changsha, Hunan, China
- Home town: Mol, Belgium
- Height: 1.56 m (5 ft 1 in)

Figure skating career
- Country: Netherlands
- Skating club: BKV Den Bosch
- Began skating: 1999

Eva Lim (born July 10, 1992, in Changsha, China) is a Chinese-born Dutch figure skater. She won the Dutch national title in the 2013–14 season. She competed internationally on the ISU Junior Grand Prix circuit and at the 2007 World Junior Figure Skating Championships. She missed most of the 2010–11 season due to injury.

== Programs ==
Season	Short program	Free skating	Exhibition
2010–2012	Mario Takes a Walk by Jesse Cook	Nessun dorma (from Turandot) by Giacomo Puccini performed by Vanessa-Mae	
2008–2009	Classical Gas by Vanessa-Mae	Anastasia by David Newman	
2006–2008	Swan Lake by Pyotr Ilyich Tchaikovsky	Chocolat by Rachel Portman	Because of You by Kelly Clarkson

== Results ==
JGP: Junior Grand Prix

International
Event	2005–06	2006–07	2007–08	2008–09	2009–10	2010–11	2011–12	2013–14
Challenge Cup				6th			21st	
Cup of Nice							25th	
NRW Trophy			11th J.	9th J.		25th	26th	13th
Printemps							13th	
Kempen Trophy			3rd				3rd	
International: Junior or novice
Junior Worlds		48th						
JGP Czech Republic		19th						
JGP Italy				22nd				
JGP South Africa				15th				
JGP United States			20th					
EYOF				18th				
Triglav Trophy	13th N.							
National
Dutch Champ.	2nd J.	1st J.	2nd	2nd	2nd		2nd	1st
Levels: N. = Novice, J. = Junior
