= Maurice Lim =

Dutch figure skater

Figure skating career
- Country: Netherlands

Maurice Lim (born 1984) is a Dutch figure skater who was a two-time champion of the Dutch Figure Skating Championships.

He won his first championships at the age of 14 and Alexei Mishin's considered him one of the top talents of his time. At that time he declared to have no interest in pursuing figure skating seriously. Instead he followed his father's career and in 2010 started a dentistry practice in Ridderkerk.

== Results ==
Event	1998–99	1999–00	2000–01
European Championships		33rd	
Dutch Championships	1st	1st	
ISU JGP Kiev			12th
ISU JGP Harbin			15th
