= Karen Venhuizen =

Dutch figure skater

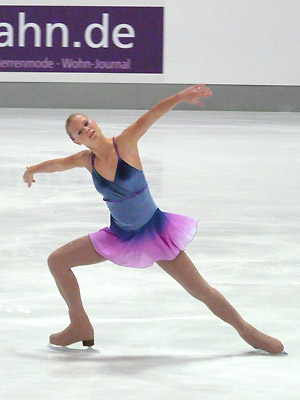
- Venhuizen in 2007

Personal information
- Born: 4 April 1984 (age 42)
- Height: 1.72 m (5 ft 7 1/2 in)

Figure skating career
- Country: Netherlands
- Skating club: KCG Groningen
- Began skating: 1989
- Retired: 2008

Karen Venhuizen (born 4 April 1984) is a Dutch former competitive figure skater. She is the 2003 Triglav Trophy champion, the 2007 International Challenge Cup champion, and a nine-time (2000–08) Dutch national champion. She qualified for the free skate at seven ISU Championships – two World and five European Championships. Her best placement, 14th, came at the 2008 Europeans.

== Personal life ==
Venhuizen was born 4 April 1984 in Zoetermeer, Netherlands. From 2001 to 2003, she suffered from anorexia nervosa. After the 2008 European Championships, she was diagnosed with Guillain–Barré syndrome.

== Career ==
Venhuizen started skating at the age of five. In the 1999–2000 season, she debuted on the ISU Junior Grand Prix (JGP) series and then won her first senior national title, earning assignments to her first ISU Championships. In February 2000, she reached the free skate and finished 21st overall at the European Championships in Vienna after placing tenth in her qualifying group, 23rd in the short, and 21st in the free. In March, she competed at the 2000 World Junior Championships in Oberstdorf; she advanced out of her qualifying group but was eliminated after the short program.

Venhuizen made her final junior-level appearances at the start of the 2000–01 season before repeating as the Dutch national senior champion. She qualified for the final segment at both the 2001 European Championships in Bratislava and at the 2001 World Championships in Vancouver.

Venhuizen won gold medals at the 2003 Triglav Trophy in Slovenia and at the 2007 International Challenge Cup in The Hague. Her best ISU Championship result, 14th, came at the 2008 Europeans in Zagreb, Croatia. It was also the highest placement by a Dutch figure skater since Dianne de Leeuw became the European champion in 1976.

== Programs ==
Season	Short program	Free skating
2007–2008	Music of the Night by Andrew Lloyd Webber	West Side Story by Leonard Bernstein
2006–2007	Seven Years in Tibet by John Williams	Harlem Nocturne Blues by Earle Hagen; Fosse; Fever
2005–2006	The Promise by Secret Garden	Blues in the Night; In a Sentimental Mood
2004–2005	The Man with the Golden Arm by Elmer Bernstein; Roger Rabbit; Big Bad Voodoo Daddy	Gladiator by Hans Zimmer; Symphony Sur Glace
2003–2004	The Giving by Michael W. Smith	Bolero Fantasy; East of Eden by Leonard Rosenman
2002–2003	Mary and Steve's Tango (from The Wedding Planner) by Mervyn Warren	Fire and Ice (soundtrack) by various composers; East of Eden (soundtrack) by Leonard Rosenman
2001–2002	Mary and Steve's Tango (from The Wedding Planner) by Mervyn Warren	The Phantom of the Opera; Jesus Christ Superstar; Don't Cry for Me Argentina by Andrew Lloyd Webber
2000–2001	Violin Fantasie on Puccini's Turandot performed by Vanessa-Mae	Variations of Andrew Lloyd Webber arranged by Jan Hughes The BBC Concert Orchestra
1999–2000	Ever After by George Fenton	unknown

== Results ==
GP: Grand Prix; JGP: Junior Grand Prix

International
Event	98–99	99–00	00–01	01–02	02–03	03–04	04–05	05–06	06–07	07–08	08–09
Worlds			22nd			34th	24th				
Europeans		21st	21st	28th	29th	22nd	20th		26th	14th	
GP NHK Trophy							10th				
Challenge Cup									1st		
Crystal Skate			4th								
Cup of Nice								4th	4th		
Finlandia Trophy						8th					
Golden Spin						14th		10th		11th	
Nebelhorn Trophy										16th	
Nepela Memorial						7th		8th			
NRW Trophy											13th
Schäfer Memorial							16th		12th		
Triglav Trophy					1st						
International: Junior
Junior Worlds		29th									
JGP Netherlands		13th									
JGP Poland			14th								
JGP Slovenia		13th									
JGP Ukraine			7th								
Golden Bear	4th J										
National
Dutch Champ.	4th	1st	1st	1st	1st	1st	1st	1st	1st	1st	
WD: Withdrew
