= Manouk Gijsman =

Dutch figure skater

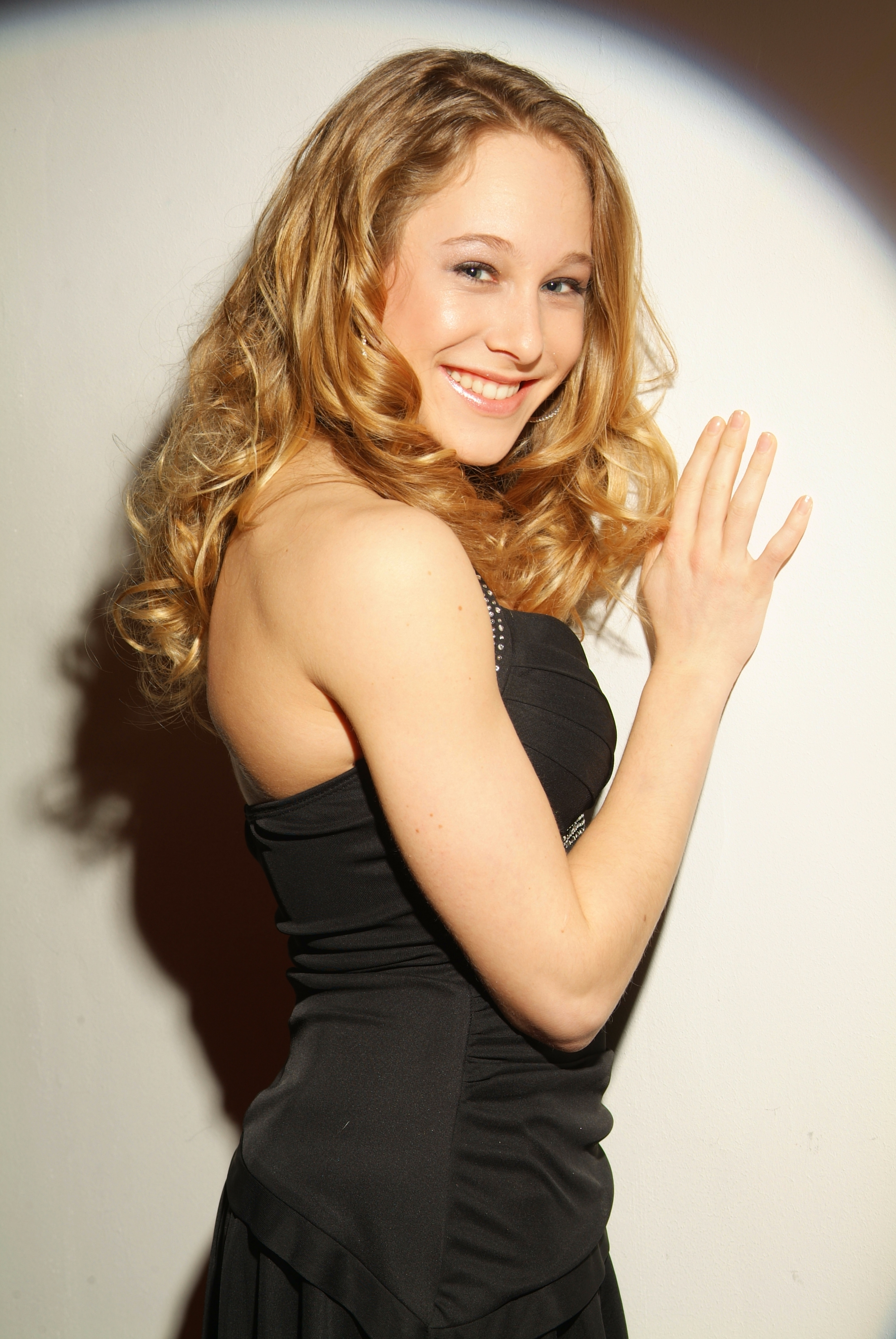
- Gijsman in 2009

Personal information
- Born: 29 September 1992 (age 34) Leiderdorp, Netherlands
- Home town: Alphen aan den Rijn, Netherlands
- Height: 1.59 m (5 ft 2 1/2 in)

Figure skating career
- Country: Netherlands
- Skating club: VTK Alphen aan den Rijn
- Began skating: 2000
- Retired: 2012

Manouk Gijsman (born 29 September 1992 in Leiderdorp) is a Dutch former competitive figure skater. She is a three-time Dutch national champion and reached the free skate at three ISU Championships – 2009 Europeans in Helsinki, 2010 Junior Worlds in The Hague, and 2010 Worlds in Turin.

== Programs ==
Season	Short program	Free skating	Exhibition
2011–12	Nothing Else Matters by Metallica	Sing Sing Sing by Benny Goodman	
2010–11	Nothing Else Matters by Metallica	Adios Nonino by Astor Piazzolla	
2009–10	Piano Fantasy by William Joseph performed by Maksim Mrvica	Phantom of the Opera by Andrew Lloyd Webber performed by Trans-Siberian Orchestra	Crazy Little Thing Called Love by Queen
2008–09	You're Still You by Josh Groban	Phantom of the Opera by Andrew Lloyd Webber performed by Trans-Siberian Orchestra	
2007–08	In the Mood by Glenn Miller	Blues in the Night (from Ocean's 11); Sing Sing Sing by Louis Prima	Frozen by Madonna

== Competitive highlights ==
JGP: Junior Grand Prix

International
Event	07–08	08–09	09–10	10–11	11–12
Worlds			24th		
Europeans		22nd	28th	WD	32nd
Challenge Cup		10th			16th
Crystal Skate		11th			
Merano Cup			14th	21st	
Nebelhorn Trophy			19th		20th
NRW Trophy		4th	11th	22nd	
Triglav Trophy		10th		11th	
International: Junior or novice
Junior Worlds	45th	28th	23rd		
JGP France		24th			
JGP Germany	14th				
JGP Spain		28th			
JGP Turkey			23rd		
JGP USA			8th		
Bavarian Open	15th J				
Challenge Cup	8th J				
Cup of Nice	7th J				
National
Dutch Champ.	1st J	1st	1st	2nd	1st
WD: Withdrew; Levels: N. = Novice; J. = Junior
