= Arnoud Hendriks =

Dutch figure skater

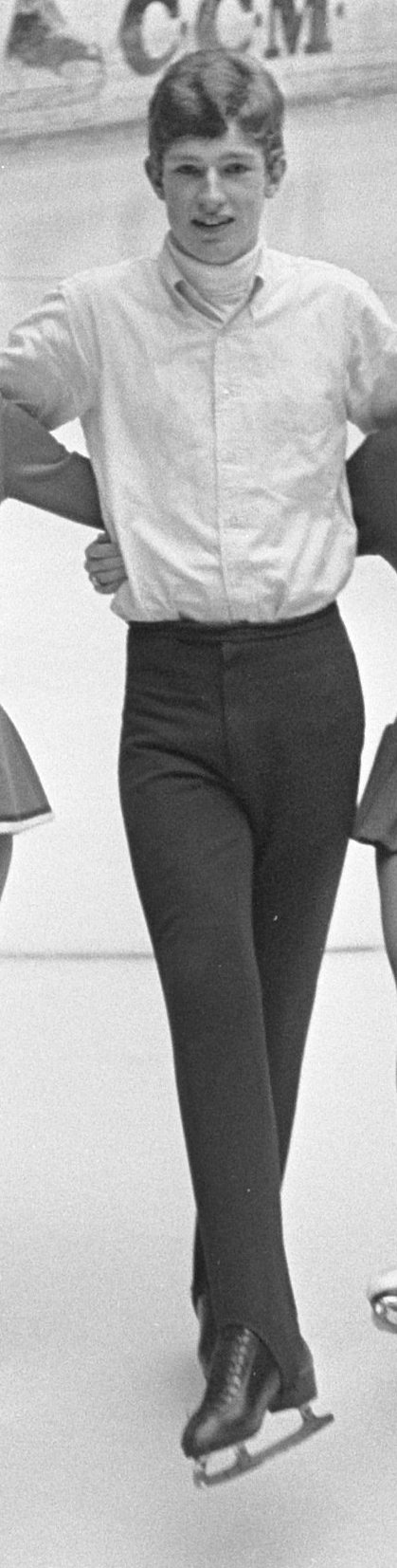
- Arnold Hendricks

Figure skating career
- Country: Netherlands

Arnoud Hendriks (born 1949, The Hague) is a former Dutch figure skater.

== Results ==
| Event | 1964 | 1965 | 1966 | 1967 | 1968 | 1969 | 1970 | 1971 |
|---|---|---|---|---|---|---|---|---|
| European Championships | | | | | 22nd | 21st | | |
| Dutch Championships | 2nd | 1st | 1st | 1st | 1st | 1st | 1st | 1st |
