= Monique van der Velden =

Dutch figure skater

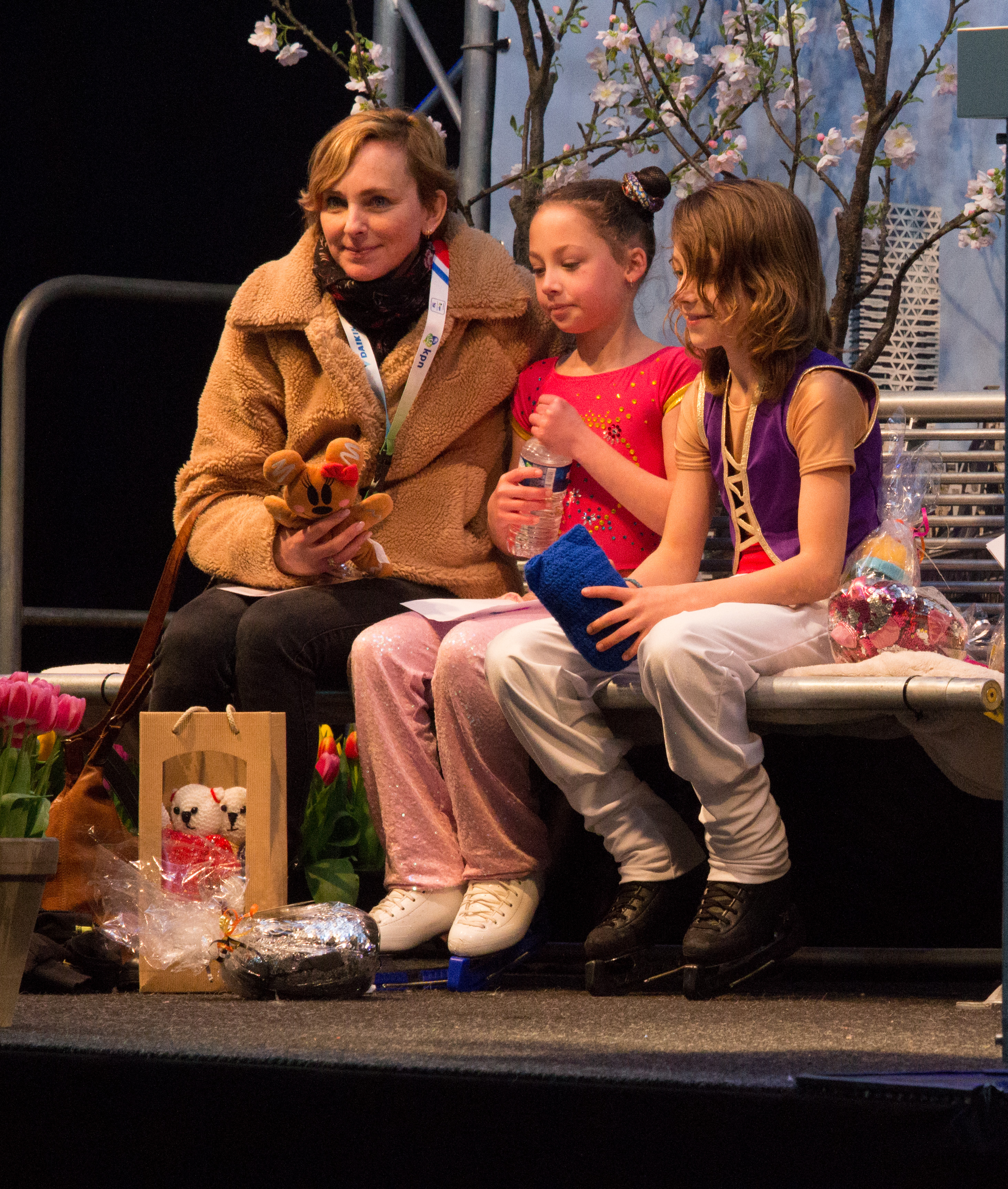
- Monique van der Velden with her kids Nora and Beau, who competed in the Challenge Cup 2020

Personal information
- Born: 1973 (age 52–53) Badhoevedorp

Figure skating career
- Country: Netherlands

Monique van der Velden (born 1973) is a Dutch former competitive figure skater. She is a three-time Dutch national champion (1993–95) and reached the free skate at the 1995 European Championships in Dortmund, Germany.

Van der Velden is from Badhoevedorp. She began skating at age nine. She was coached by Corrie Broweleit.

In 2006, she was paired with a Belgian TV presenter, Staf Coppens, on Dancing on Ice (Netherlands and Belgium). The two were named as the champions. She married Coppens on 20 September 2014. They have two children, Beau (born in February 2008) and Nora (born in December 2009).

== Competitive highlights ==
International
Event	1990–91	1991–92	1992–93	1993–94	1994–95
Worlds			35th		30th
Europeans				35th	22nd
Junior Worlds	FNR				
National
Dutch Champ.	2nd	3rd	1st	1st	1st
FNR: Did not reach free skate
