= Sherim van Geffen =

Dutch ice dancer

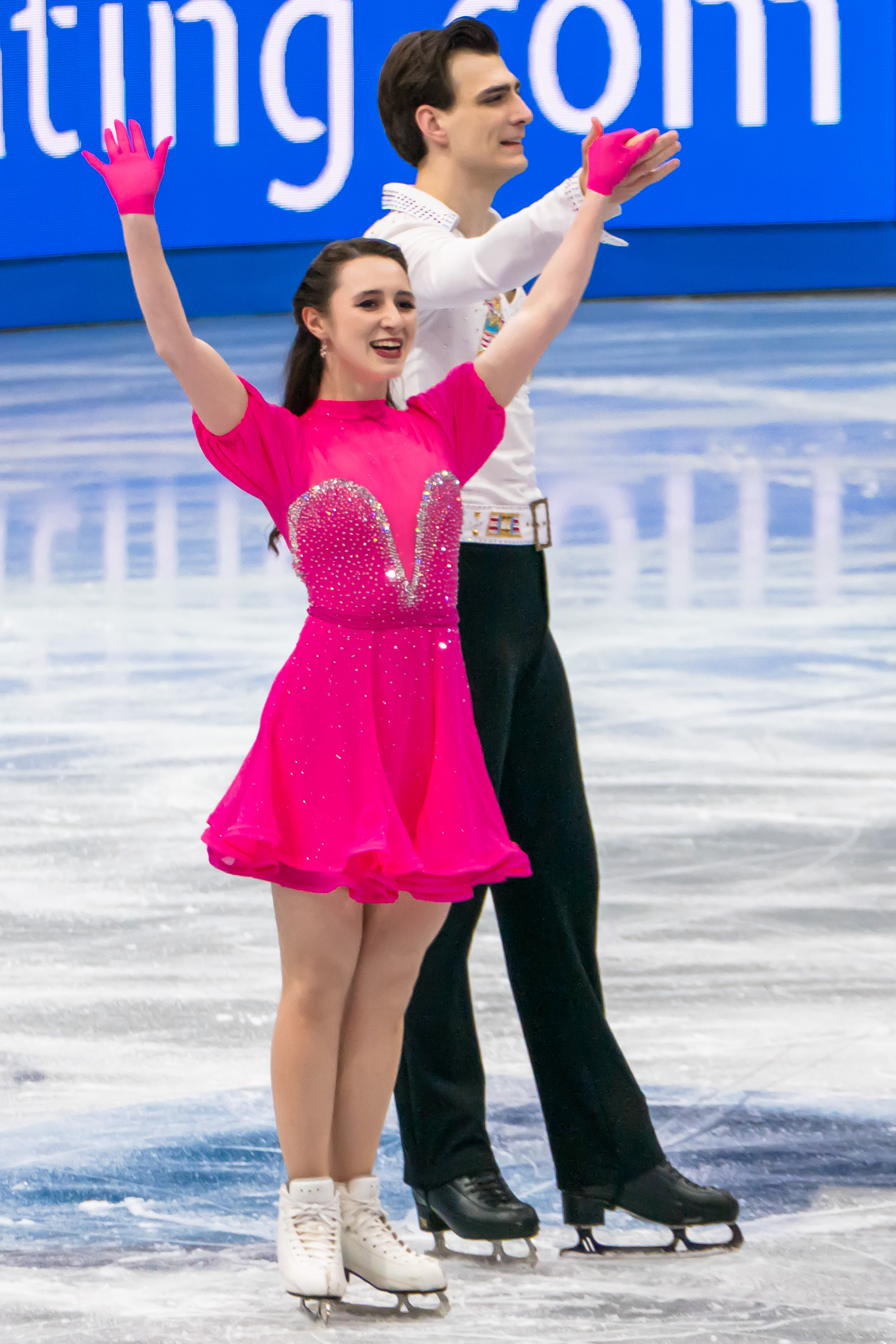
- Verhaegh and van Geffen at the 2025 World Championships

Personal information
- Born: 16 July 1993 (age 33) Arnhem, Netherlands
- Home town: Arnhem
- Height: 1.88 m (6 ft 2 in)

Figure skating career
- Country: Netherlands
- Partner: Chelsea Verhaegh
- Coach: Maksym Nikitin; Oleksandra Nazarova
- Skating club: DDD Dordrecht
- Began skating: 2007

Medal record
Dutch Championships
Gold medal – first place	2020 The Hague	Ice dance
Gold medal – first place	2021 The Hague	Ice dance
Gold medal – first place	2023 Tilburg	Ice dance
Gold medal – first place	2026 Tilburg	Ice dance
Silver medal – second place	2024 Tilburg	Ice dance
Silver medal – second place	2025 Tilburg	Ice dance

Sherim van Geffen (born 16 July 1993) is a Dutch figure skater who currently competes in ice dance with partner, Chelsea Verhaegh. With Verhaegh, he is a four-time Dutch national champion (2020–21, 2023, 2026), and has competed at the World Figure Skating Championships three times.

== Personal life ==
Van Geffen was born on 16 July 1993 in Arnhem, Netherlands.

== Career ==
=== Early years ===
Van Geffen began learning how to skate in 2007. He trained as a single skater through the end of the 2018–19 season before transitioning to ice dance in the beginning of 2019, teaming up with fellow Dutch single skater, Chelsea Verhaegh. Their first coach was Peter Moormann, who primarily trained them in Hoorn, Alkmaar, Utrecht, Eindhoven.

During their first season together, they won the gold medal at the 2020 International Challenge Cup.

=== 2020–21 season ===
Prior to the season, Verhaegh/van Geffen made a coaching change from Peter Moormann to Maurizio Margaglio, with the team splitting their training time between Eindhoven, Utrecht, Dordrecht, Netherlands and Helsinki, Finland.

They started the season by winning bronze at the 2020 NRW Trophy and finishing seventh at the 2020 Ice Star. In February, Verhaegh/van Geffen placed fifth at the 2021 LuMi Dance Trophy and winning bronze at the 2021 International Challenge Cup. They subsequently finished the season by making their Championship debut at the 2021 World Championships in Stockholm, Sweden, and finishing twenty-ninth overall.

=== 2021–22 season ===
Verhaegh/van Geffen began the season by competing on the 2021–22 ISU Challenger Series, placing nineteenth at the 2021 CS Nebelhorn Trophy and seventeenth at the 2021 CS Finlandia Trophy. They followed this up by finishing sixth at the 2021 NRW Trophy and twelfth at the 2021 Open d'Andorra.

They finished the season with a fourteenth-place finish at the 2021 CS Golden Spin of Zagreb.

=== 2022–23 season ===
Verhaegh/van Geffen opened the season with a seventh-place finish at the 2022 Mezzaluna Cup. They followed this up by placing tenth at the 2022 CS Ice Challenge, ninth at the 2022 Santa Claus Cup, and eighteenth at the 2022 CS Golden Spin of Zagreb.

In January, Verhaegh/van Geffen finished eighth at the 2023 Bavarian Open. They then went on to place eighth at the 2023 Egna Dance Trophy and eighth at the 2023 International Challenge Cup.

Verhaegh/van Geffen ultimately closed the season by finishing thirty-first at the 2023 World Championships in Saitama, Japan.

=== 2023–24 season ===
Verhaegh/van Geffen started the season by winning silver at the 2023 KNSB Cup. They then went on to finish seventeenth at the 2023 Mezzaluna Cup, twentieth at the 2023 CS Warsaw Cup, and sixteenth at the 2023 Bosphorus Cup.

In January, Verhaegh/van Geffen placed fifth at the 2024 Ephesus Cup and eleventh at the 2024 Bavarian Open. They then finished the season with a ninth-place finish at the 2024 International Challenge Cup.

Following the season, it was announced that Verhaegh/van Geffen had begun training in Dordrecht, Netherlands full-time under new coaches, Maksym Nikitin and Oleksandra Nazarova.

=== 2024–25 season ===
Verhaegh/van Geffen began their season by finishing sixteenth at the 2024 CS Trophée Métropole Nice Côte d'Azur. They followed up this result by placing seventh at the 2024 Pavel Roman Memorial, fourth at the 2024 NRW Trophy, fourteenth at the 2024 Bosphorus Cup, and fifth at the 2024 EduSport Trophy.

Following a fourth-place finish at the 2025 Bavarian Open at the end of January, the team subsequently placed seventh at the 2025 International Challenge Cup two weeks later.

Verhaegh/van Geffen then closed the season by placing thirty-second at the 2025 World Championships in Boston, Massachusetts, United States.

=== 2025–26 season ===
Verhaegh/van Geffen opened their season with a fifth-place finish at the 2025 International Ice Dance Dordrecht. They then went on to finish sixteenth at the ISU Skate to Milano, tenth at the 2025 CS Nepela Memorial, seventh at the 2025 Budapest Trophy, tenth at the 2025 NRW Trophy, thirteenth at the 2025 Bosphorus Cup, and eighteenth at the 2025 CS Golden Spin of Zagreb.

In January, Verhaegh/van Geffen placed sixth at the 2026 Sofia Trophy and twenty-third at the 2026 European Championships.

== Programs ==
=== Ice dance with Chelsea Verhaegh ===
Season	Rhythm dance	Free dance
2025–2026	Smooth by Santana, Itaal Shur, & Rob Thomas; Livin' la Vida Loca by Ricky Martin & Desmond Child choreo. by Maksym Nikitin, Oleksandra Nazarova	Stranger by Rok Nardin; My Love (from The Twilight Saga: Eclipse) by Sia; Dressed to Kill by Rok Nardin choreo. by Maksym Nikitin, Oleksandra Nazarova
2024–2025	Only You (And You Alone) by The Platters; Trouble; A Little Less Conversation by Elvis Presley choreo. by Maksym Nikitin, Oleksandra Nazarova	Yearning Hearts by Eternal Eclipse; Tango to Evora by Loreena McKennitt; Yearning Hearts by Eternal Eclipse choreo. by Maksym Nikitin, Oleksandra Nazarova
2023–2024	Stop Loving You by Toto; The Look by Roxette choreo. by Maurizio Margaglio, Xavier Ouellette, Mylenne Lamoureux, Isabel Delobel, Luca Lanotte, Neil Brown	The Loneliest by Måneskin; Love Is Gone by Dylan Matthew & SLANDER; It's Always Been You by Phil Wickham choreo. by Maurizio Margaglio, Xavier Ouellette, Mylenne Lamoureux, Isabel Delobel, Luca Lanotte, Neil Brown
2022–2023	Rhumba: Sing It Back by Moloko; Samba: Katchi by Ofenbach, Nick Waterhouse, & Leon Bridges choreo. by Neil Brown	Hello; Never Go Back by Evanescence choreo. by Neil Brown
2021–2022	Blues: New Shine by Sophia Urista; Funk: Walk That Walk by Bakermat and Nic Hanson	War of Hearts (Acoustic) by Ruelle; Chalkboard (from The Theory of Everything) by Jóhann Jóhannsson; Oh My My; Live Like Legends by Ruelle
2020–2021	Diamonds Are a Girl's Best Friend by Leo Robin & Jule Styne performed by Marilyn Monroe	War of Hearts (Acoustic) by Ruelle; Chalkboard (from The Theory of Everything) by Jóhann Jóhannsson; Oh My My; Live Like Legends by Ruelle

== Competitive highlights ==
- CS – Event of the ISU Challenger Series
- TBD – Assigned
- WD – Withdrew from competition

=== Ice dance with Chelsea Verhaegh ===
Competition placements at senior level
Season	2019–20	2020–21	2021–22	2022–23	2023–24	2024–25	2025–26	2026–27
World Championships		29th		31st		32nd		
European Championships							23rd	
Dutch Championships	1st	1st		1st	2nd	2nd	1st	
CS Budapest Trophy				WD				
CS Finlandia Trophy			17th					
CS Golden Spin of Zagreb			14th	18th			18th	
CS Ice Challenge				10th				
CS Nebelhorn Trophy			19th					
CS Nepela Memorial							10th	12th
CS Trophée Métropole Nice						16th		
Bavarian Open	11th			8th	11th	4th		
Bolero Cup								9th
Bosphorus Cup	12th				16th	14th	13th	
Budapest Trophy							7th	
Challenge Cup	1st	3rd		8th	9th	7th	7th	
Denkova-Staviski Cup								11th
EduSport Trophy						5th		
Egna Dance Trophy				8th				
Ephesus Trophy					5th			
ICE Dance Dordrecht							5th	
LuMi Trophy		5th						
Mentor Cup	17th							
Mezzaluna Cup				7th	17th			
NRW Trophy		3rd	6th				10th	4th
Open d'Andorra			12th					
Pavel Roman Memorial						7th		
Santa Claus Cup				9th				
Skate Berlin							WD	
Sofia Trophy							6th	
Skate to Milano							16th	
Volvo Open Cup	11th							
Winter Star		7th						

== Detailed results ==
=== Ice dance with Chelsea Verhaegh ===
ISU personal best scores in the +5/-5 GOE System
Segment	Type	Score	Event
Total	TSS	153.35	2026 CS Nepela Memorial
Rhythm dance	TSS	60.76	2026 CS Nepela Memorial
Rhythm dance	TES	36.09	2026 CS Nepela Memorial
Rhythm dance	PCS	24.67	2026 CS Nepela Memorial
Free dance	TSS	92.59	2026 CS Nepela Memorial
Free dance	TES	53.19	2026 CS Nepela Memorial
Free dance	PCS	39.40	2026 CS Nepela Memorial

Results in the 2024–25 season
Date	Event	RD		FD		Total	
Date	Event	P	Score	P	Score	P	Score
16–20 Oct 2024	(France) 2024 CS Trophée Métropole Nice Côte d'Azur	18	45.48	15	78.39	16	123.87
9–10 Nov 2024	(Czech Republic) 2024 Pavel Roman Memorial	9	54.68	6	89.55	7	144.23
13–17 Nov 2024	(Germany) 2024 NRW Trophy	5	63.08	4	100.45	4	163.53
25 Nov – 1 Dec 2024	(Turkey) 2024 Bosphorus Cup	10	60.18	16	83.29	14	143.47
12–15 Dec 2024	(Romania) 2024 EduSport Trophy	5	55.60	4	92.24	5	147.84
20–26 Jan 2024	(Germany) 2025 Bavarian Open	5	56.65	4	90.27	4	146.92
13–16 Feb 2025	(Netherlands) 2025 Challenge Cup	7	53.80	6	89.45	7	143.25
25–30 Mar 2024	(United States) 2025 World Championships	32	54.78	—N/a	—N/a	32	54.78

Results in the 2025–26 season
Date	Event	RD		FD		Total	
Date	Event	P	Score	P	Score	P	Score
16–17 Aug 2025	(Netherlands) 2025 International ICE Dance Dordrecht	4	51.26	5	85.12	5	136.38
18–21 Sep 2025	(China) 2025 Skate to Milano	18	48.15	17	79.39	16	127.54
25–27 Sep 2025	(Slovakia) 2025 CS Nepela Memorial	10	54.07	10	86.21	10	140.28
13–16 Nov 2025	(Germany) 2025 NRW Trophy	10	56.62	10	87.01	10	143.63
24–30 Nov 2025	(Turkey) 2025 Bosphorus Cup	14	56.52	12	88.88	13	145.40
3–6 Dec 2025	(Croatia) 2025 CS Golden Spin of Zagreb	19	50.86	18	81.36	18	132.22
6–11 Jan 2026	(Bulgaria) 2026 Sofia Trophy	7	57.01	5	95.06	6	152.07
13–18 Jan 2026	(United Kingdom) 2026 European Championships	23	55.42	—N/a	—N/a	23	55.42
17–21 Feb 2026	(Germany) 2026 Skate Berlin International	7	54.85	—N/a	—N/a	WD	—N/a

Results in the 2026–27 season
Date	Event	RD		FD		Total	
Date	Event	P	Score	P	Score	P	Score
3–4 Sep 2026	(United Kingdom) 2026 Bolero Cup	8	57.33	9	86.30	9	143.63
24–27 Sep 2026	(Slovakia) 2026 CS Nepela Memorial	13	60.76	12	92.59	12	153.35
6–8 Nov, 2026	(Bulgaria) 2026 Denkova-Staviski Cup	14	53.84	8	90.38	11	144.22
12–15 Nov, 2026	(Germany) 2026 NRW Trophy	4	57.69	4	89.54	4	147.23
