= Nellie Maas =

Dutch figure skater

Nelly Maas
Figure skating career
- Country: Netherlands

Nelly Maas (born 1935, The Hague) is a former Dutch figure skater.

== Results ==
Event	1952	1953	1954
European Championships		11th	10th
Dutch Championships	3rd	2nd	1st

== References, external links ==
- results
