= Rob Ouwerkerk =

Dutch figure skater

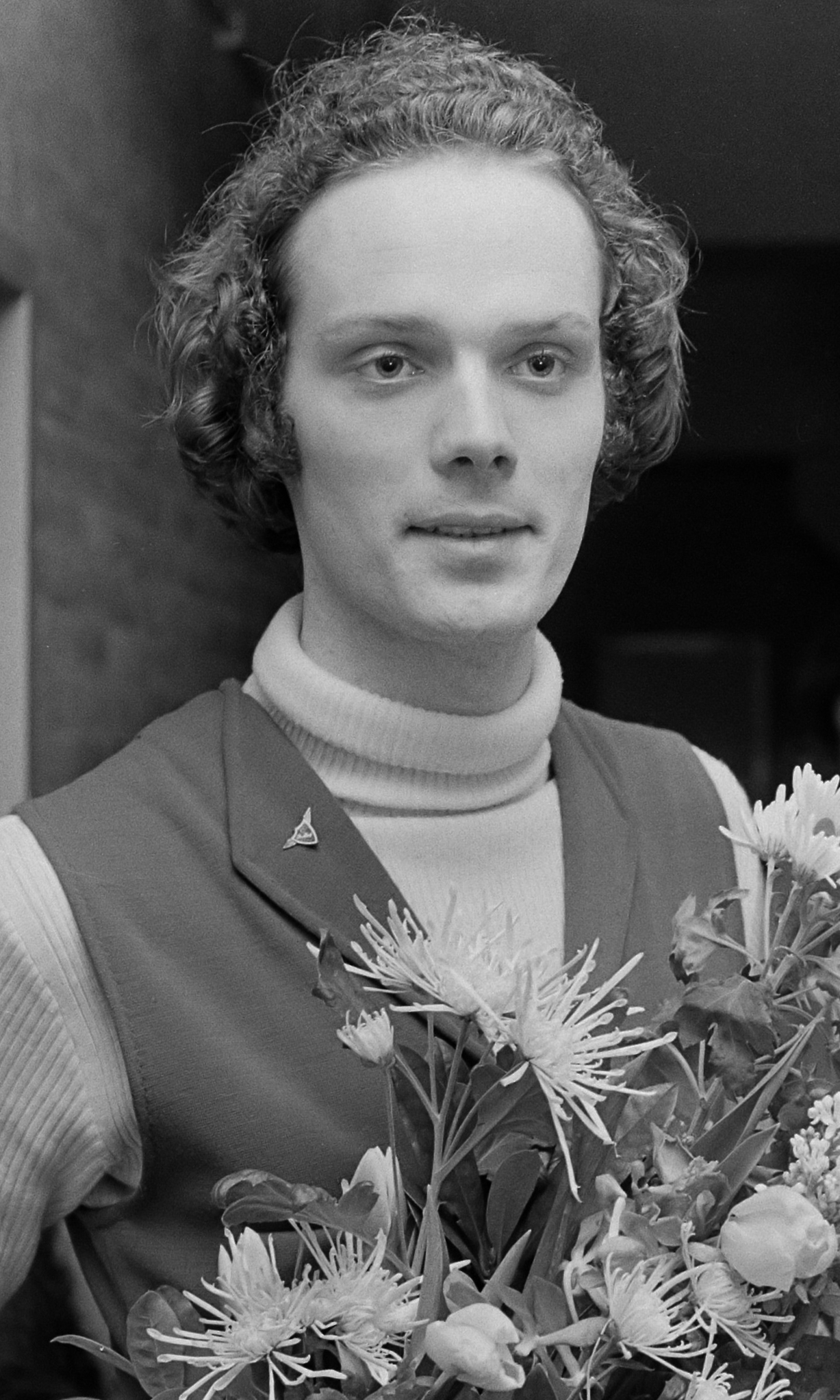
- Rob Ouwerkerk (1975)

Personal information
- Born: 18 April 1955 (age 71)

Figure skating career
- Country: Netherlands

Rob Ouwerkerk (born 18 April 1955, Amsterdam) is a former Dutch figure skater.

== Results ==
Event	1970	1971	1972	1973	1974	1975
European Championships				19th	20th	21st
Dutch Championships	2nd	2nd	1st	1st	1st	1st
Nebelhorn Trophy		3rd				
