= Marion Krijgsman =

Dutch figure skater

Personal information
- Born: 8 March 1973 (age 53) Haarlem, Netherlands
- Home town: Leek, Groningen

Figure skating career
- Country: Netherlands
- Retired: 2001

Marion Krijgsman (born 8 March 1973) is a Dutch former competitive figure skater. She is the 1999 Crystal Skate of Romania bronze medalist and a four-time Dutch national champion. She competed at ten ISU Championships, achieving her best result, 17th, at the 1991 and 1999 Europeans.

== Personal life ==
Krijgsman was born on 8 March 1973 in Haarlem. During her skating career, she resided in Leek, Groningen.

== Career ==
Krijgsman ranked 19th at the 1990 World Junior Championships in Colorado Springs, Colorado. She placed 17th at her first major senior international, the 1991 European Championships in Sofia, Bulgaria.

In the 1991–92 season, Krijgsman was training 20 hours a week, of which 18 hours was spent on the ice. She finished 22nd at the 1992 Europeans in Lausanne, Switzerland; 22nd at the 1993 Europeans in Helsinki, Finland; 22nd at the 1998 European Championships in Milan, Italy; and 17th at the 1999 European Championships in Prague, Czech Republic. She won four national titles.

As of October 2016, Krijgsman is a skating coach at Deventer IJsclub in Deventer, Netherlands. She is also an ISU technical specialist.

== Results ==
International
Event	87–88	88–89	89–90	90–91	91–92	92–93	93–94	97–98	98–99	99–00	00–01
Worlds				21st	29th				33rd	30th	
Europeans				17th	22nd	22nd		22nd	17th		
Crystal Skate										3rd	
Finlandia									11th	11th	
Nebelhorn										20th	18th
Piruetten									10th		
International: Junior
Junior Worlds			19th								
National
Dutch Champ.	3rd	2nd	2nd	1st	1st	2nd	2nd	1st	1st	2nd	2nd
