= Liubov Efimenko =

Finnish figure skater (born 1999)

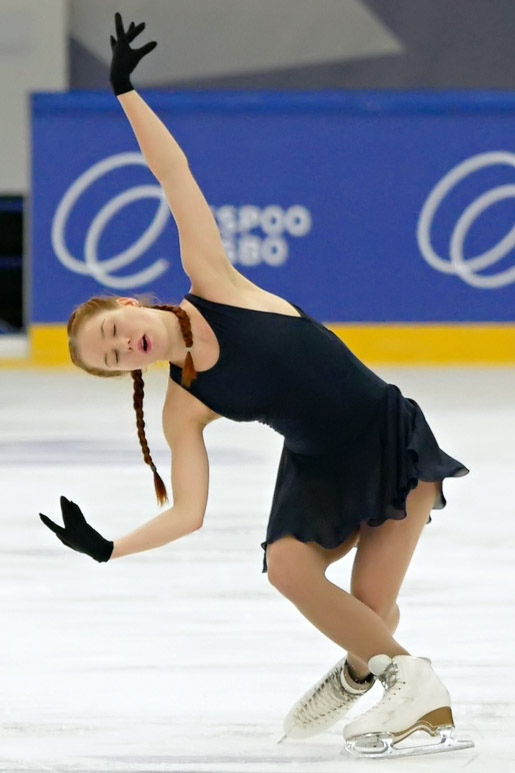
- Efimenko at the 2016 Finlandia Trophy

Personal information
- Born: 20 June 1999 (age 27) Saint Petersburg, Russia
- Home town: Lahti, Finland
- Height: 1.53 m (5 ft 0 in)

Figure skating career
- Partner: Dmitry Epstein
- Coach: Michael Huth
- Skating club: Tuusulan Luistelijat, Lahden FSC
- Began skating: 2003

Liubov Efimenko (born 20 June 1999) is a Finnish figure skater. She is the 2014 Finnish national silver medalist and has won three senior international medals, including bronze at the 2014 Nordics and silver at the 2016 Skate Helena. She has also competed in pair skating with Dmitry Epstein for the Netherlands.

== Personal life ==
Liubov Efimenko was born on 20 June 1999 in Saint Petersburg, Russia. She is of Polish descent through her father. She moved with her family to Finland when she was nine years old. She followed her older sister into skating.

== Programs ==
Season	Short program	Free skating
2016–17	Libertango performed by The Swingles	And the Waltz Goes On by Anthony Hopkins
2014–15	Concerto pour une voix by Saint-Preux	Now We Are Free (from Gladiator) by Hans Zimmer
2013–14	Concerto pour une voix by Saint-Preux	Bolero (from Moulin Rouge!)

== Competitive highlights ==
CS: Challenger Series; JGP: Junior Grand Prix

=== Pairs with Epstein for the Netherlands ===
International
Event	18–19	19–20
CS Nebelhorn		11th
Bavarian Open	7th	
Challenge Cup	4th	

=== Pairs with Penasse for Finland ===
International
Event	17–18
Cup of Nice	WD
Volvo Open Cup	4th

=== Ladies' Singles for Finland ===
International
Event	12–13	13–14	14–15	15–16	16–17
CS Finlandia			4th		14th
CS Lombardia					16th
CS Warsaw Cup					23rd
Avas Cup				1st	
Bavarian Open				7th	
Golden Bear					9th
Tallinn Trophy			3rd		
Nordics		3rd			
NRW Trophy					13th
Skate Helena				2nd	
Printemps				5th	
International: Junior
JGP Estonia		7th	9th		
JGP Czech Rep.			13th		
JGP Latvia		12th			
JGP Slovenia					12th
Bavarian Open		2nd J			
Cup of Nice	4th J				
Gardena		4th J			
Nordics	6th J				
Rooster Cup					
National
Finnish Champ.	2nd J	2nd	WD	6th	6th
