= Steve Jansen (soccer) =

Canadian soccer player (born 1967)

Personal information
- Full name: Stephen Francis Jansen
- Date of birth: 4 November 1967 (age 59)
- Place of birth: Toronto, Ontario, Canada
- Height: 1.83 m (6 ft 0 in)
- Position: Defender

Senior career*
Years	Team	Apps	(Gls)
1988–1990	North York Rockets	45	(1)
1991–1992	Toronto Blizzard	32	(3)

International career
1986–1987	Canada U20	17	(1)
1988–1989	Canada	8	(0)
- * Club domestic league appearances and goals

Stephen Francis Jansen (born 4 November 1967) is a Canadian former soccer player who earned 8 caps for the Canadian national side between 1988 and 1989. Born in Toronto, Ontario, Jansen played club football for North York Rockets and Toronto Blizzard. His sister is figure skater Astrid Jansen.
