= Astrid Winkelman =

Dutch figure skater

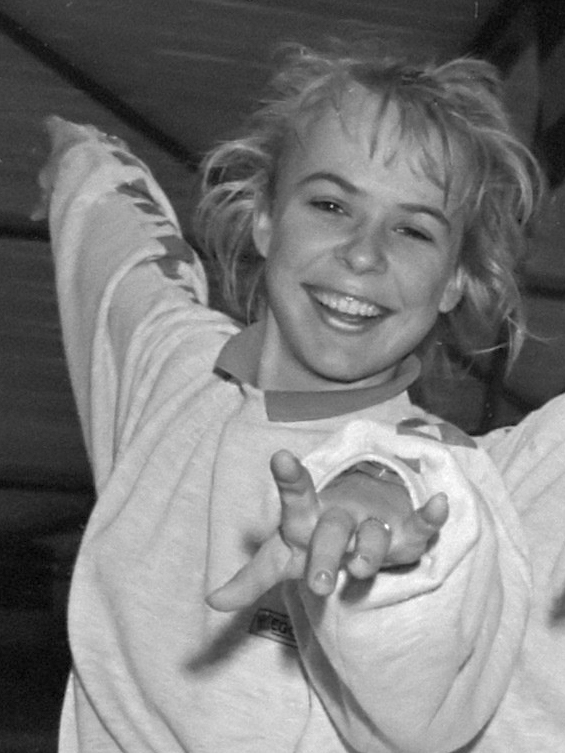
Astrid Winkelman in 1987

Astrid Winkelman (born 3 June 1970 in Rotterdam) is a Dutch former competitive figure skater.

She currently coaches Figure Skating clubs in Haarlem and Utrecht and is the Technical Director of "Dazzling On Tour"

== Results ==
Event	1986-87	1987-88	1988-89	1989-90	1990-91	1991-92	1992-93	1993-94
World Championships								
European Championships				20th				
Dutch Championships	3rd	1st		1st				
Benelux Championship				1st				
