= Rudina Pasveer =

Dutch figure skater

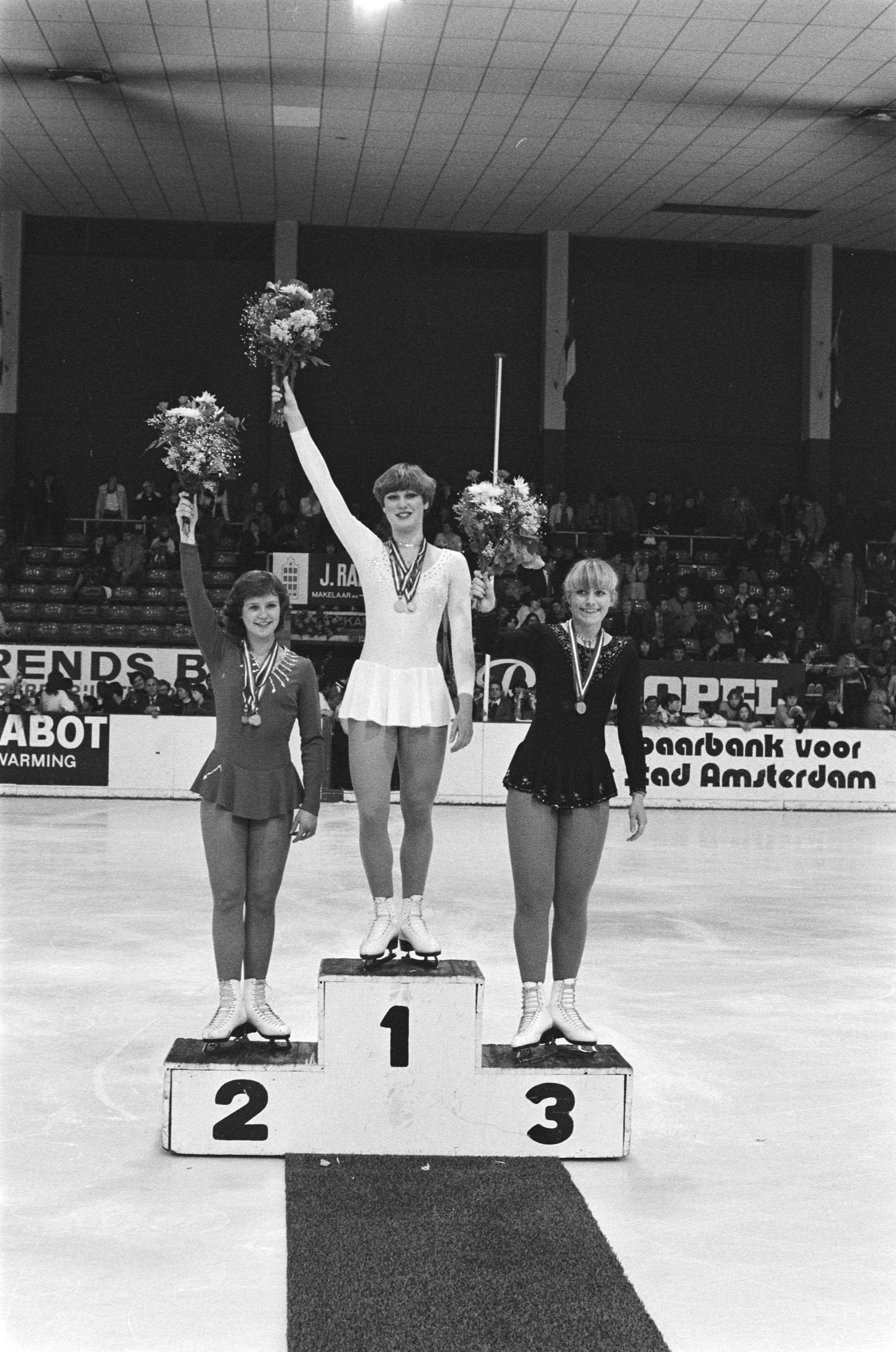
- Pasveer (silver) at the Dutch Championships in January 1979

Personal information
- Born: 1960s
- Home town: Groningen, Netherlands

Figure skating career
- Country: Netherlands
- Skating club: KunstrijClub Groningen
- Began skating: c. 1970

Rudina Pasveer (born in the 1960s) is a Dutch former competitive figure skater. She won the 1981 Dutch national title and competed at five ISU Championships.

== Career ==
Pasveer began learning to skate with her sister in Groningen, around 1970. She trained at KunstrijClub Groningen. She finished ninth at the 1977 and 1978 World Junior Championships in Megève, France.

Pasveer's first senior national medal, bronze, came at the 1977 Dutch Championships. She took silver at the next three editions and placed 25th at her first senior ISU Championship, the 1980 World Championships in Dortmund, West Germany.

In 1981, Pasveer became the Dutch national senior ladies' champion. She finished 15th at the 1981 European Championships in Innsbruck, Austria, and 25th at the 1981 World Championships in Hartford, Connecticut, United States.

After ending her amateur career, she competed at four consecutive World Professional Championships in Jaca.

== Competitive highlights ==
=== Amateur career ===
International
Event	1973	1974	1975	1976	1977	1978	1979	1980	1981	1982	1983
Worlds								25th	25th		
Europeans									15th		
International: Junior
Junior Worlds					9th	9th					
National
Dutch Champ.	3rd B	1st B	2nd A		3rd	2nd	2nd	2nd	1st		2nd
A = Junior A; B = Junior B

=== Professional career ===
International
Event	1987	1988	1989	1990
World Professional Championships (Jaca)	13th	11th	13th	13th
