= Joan Haanappel =

Dutch figure skater (1940–2024)

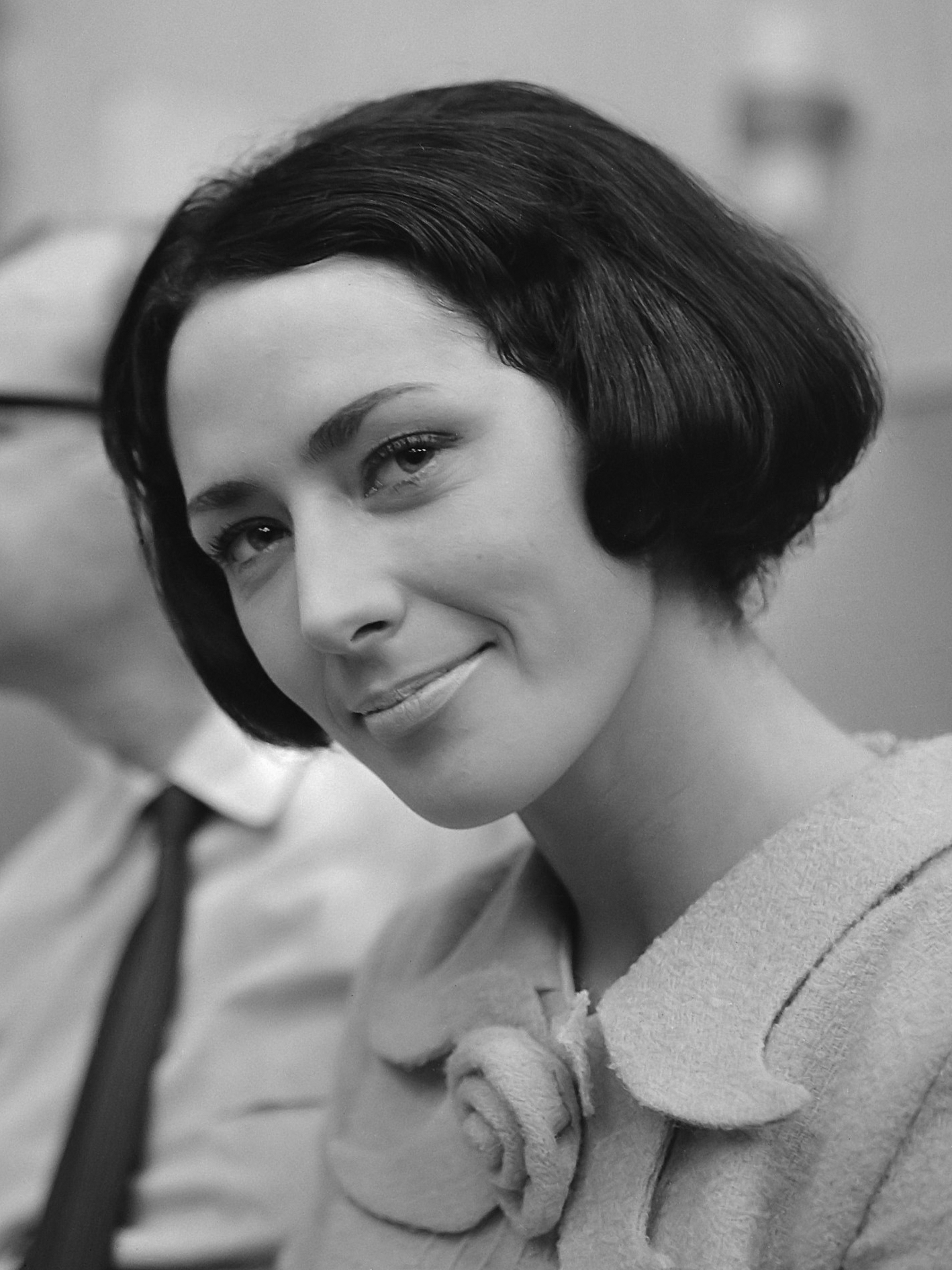
- Haanappel in 1964

Personal information
- Born: 13 November 1940 The Hague, German-occupied Netherlands
- Died: 23 February 2024 (aged 83) Wezembeek-Oppem, Belgium

Figure skating career
- Country: Netherlands
- Retired: 1960
Medal record
Representing Netherlands
Figure skating: Ladies' singles
European Championships
Bronze medal – third place	1960 Garmisch-Partenkirchen	Ladies' singles
Bronze medal – third place	1959 Davos	Ladies' singles
Bronze medal – third place	1958 Bratislava	Ladies' singles

Joan Haanappel (13 November 1940 – 23 February 2024) was a Dutch figure skater and sports presenter for NOS, AVRO, ZDF and Eurosport. She was a three-time European bronze medalist (1958–1960) and a four-time Dutch national champion.

== Career ==
=== Skating career ===
Haanappel began skating in 1949 at Houtrust ice skating club in The Hague. Aged 12 years, she competed at her first major international competition, the European Championships in Dortmund, where she finished 14th. She won the first of her four Dutch national titles in 1955. She finished 13th at the 1956 Winter Olympics in Cortina d'Ampezzo, Italy.

In 1958, Haanappel became the first Dutch figure skater to win a continental medal, finishing third behind Austrian duo Ingrid Wendl and Hanna Walter at the 1958 European Championships in Bratislava, Czechoslovakia. The following season, she was surpassed by Sjoukje Dijkstra at the Dutch Championships. She took bronze at the 1959 European Championships in Davos, Switzerland, joining Walter and Dijkstra on the podium.

1959–1960 was Haanappel's final competitive season. She won gold at the Richmond Trophy and finished second again to Dijkstra at the Dutch Championships. She won her third consecutive bronze medal at the 1960 European Championships in Garmisch-Partenkirchen, West Germany, and then placed 5th at the 1960 Winter Olympics in Squaw Valley, Placer County, California.

After the 1960 World Championships, Haanappel retired from amateur competition and turned professional, performing with the Vienna Ice Revue before joining Holiday on Ice.

=== Later career ===
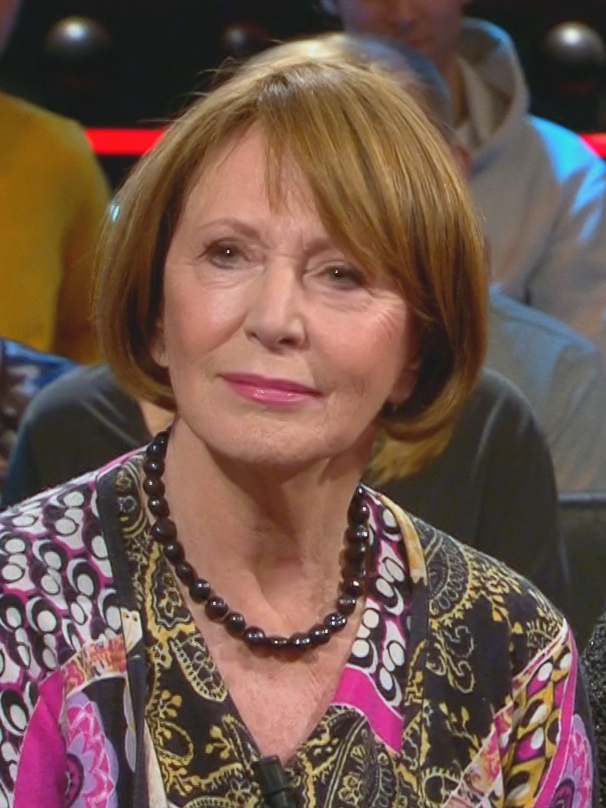
Haanappel in 2018

In 1976, Haanappel began a 30-year television career as a presenter and sports commentator. She worked for Studio Sport, Eurosport, the sports division at ZDF (Germany), and as a freelancer.

In 2005, Haanappel was appointed to the figure skating committee of the Royal Netherlands Skating Federation (KNSB). In 2006, she became the first figure skater to be elected a member of the KNSB Council. She left the KNSB Council in 2008.

Haanappel founded Stichting Kunstrijden Nederland, SKN, (Netherlands Figure Skating Foundation) [www.sknfonds.nl], a non-profit organisation supporting talented young Dutch figure skaters. On 12 November 2008 she was appointed Knight in the Royal Order of Orange-Nassau.

== Death ==
Haanappel died on 23 February 2024, at the age of 83.

== Results ==
International
Event	50–51	51–52	52–53	53–54	54–55	55–56	56–57	57–58	58–59	59–60
Olympics						13th				5th
World Champ.					15th	11th	13th	8th	WD	5th
European Champ.			14th	18th		8th		3rd	3rd	3rd
Richmond Trophy						2nd	2nd			1st
National
Dutch Champ.	3rd		3rd	2nd	1st	1st	1st	1st	2nd	2nd
WD = Withdrew
