= 2022 CS Lombardia Trophy =

Figure skating competition

- Type: ISU Challenger Series
- Date: September 16 – 19
- Season: 2022–23
- Location: Bergamo, Italy
- Host: Federazione Italiana Sport del Ghiaccio
- Venue: IceLab Bergamo Palaghiaccio

Champions
- Men's singles: (France) Adam Siao Him Fa
- Women's singles: (Japan) Rinka Watanabe
- Ice dance: (Italy) Charlène Guignard / Marco Fabbri
- Previous: 2021 CS Lombardia Trophy
- Next: 2023 CS Lombardia Trophy
- Previous CS: 2022 CS U.S. International Classic
- Next CS: 2022 CS Nebelhorn Trophy

The 2022 CS Lombardia Trophy was held on September 16–18, 2022, in Bergamo, Italy. It was the second event of the 2022–23 ISU Challenger Series. Medals were awarded in men's singles, women's singles, and ice dance.

== Entries ==
The International Skating Union published the list of entries on August 22, 2022.

Country	Men	Women	Ice dance
Chinese Taipei		Ting Tzu-Han	
Czech Republic		Nikola Rychtařiková	Natálie Taschlerová / Filip Taschler
Estonia		Gerli Liinamäe	
Finland		Janna Jyrkinen; Oona Ounasvuori	
France	Luc Economides; Adam Siao Him Fa		Loïcia Demougeot / Théo le Mercier; Natacha Lagouge / Arnaud Caffa
Georgia	Nika Egadze		
Ireland	Samuel McAllister		
Italy	Emanuele Indelicato; Nikolaj Memola; Matteo Rizzo	Elena Agostinelli; Lara Naki Gutmann; Anna Pezzetta	Charlène Guignard / Marco Fabbri; Elisabetta Leccardi / Mattia Dalla Torre; Victoria Manni / Carlo Röthlisberger
Japan	Koshiro Shimada	Wakaba Higuchi; Kaori Sakamoto; Rinka Watanabe	
Lithuania		Daria Afinogenova	Paulina Ramanauskaitė / Deividas Kizala; Allison Reed / Saulius Ambrulevičius
Netherlands			Hanna Jakucs / Alessio Galli
Poland		Ekaterina Kurakova	Jenna Hertenstein / Damian Binkowski
Slovakia		Alexandra Michaela Filcová	Mária Sofia Pucherová / Nikita Lysak
Slovenia	David Sedej		
Switzerland		Sarina Joos	
Ukraine	Mykhailo Rudkovskyi		
United States	Tomoki Hiwatashi; Dinh Tran	Amber Glenn; Hanna Harrell	Emily Bratti / Ian Somerville

=== Changes to preliminary assignments ===
Date	Discipline	Withdrew	Added	Notes	Ref.
August 25	Men	—	(Georgia (country)) Nika Egadze		
August 29	Ice dance	(France) Lou Terreaux / Noé Perron	—		
August 29	Ice dance	(United States) Caroline Green / Michael Parsons	—		
September 12	Women	(Belgium) Nina Pinzarrone	—	Injury	
September 14	Women	(Belgium) Jade Hovine	—		
September 14	Ice dance	(Italy) Carolina Portesi Peroni / Michael Chrastecky	—		

== Results ==
=== Men's singles ===
Rank	Skater	Nation	Total points	SP		FS	
1st place, gold medalist(s)	Adam Siao Him Fa	France	237.19	2	84.69	1	152.50
2nd place, silver medalist(s)	Koshiro Shimada	Japan	235.90	1	89.18	4	146.72
3rd place, bronze medalist(s)	Nikolaj Memola	Italy	230.52	4	81.68	3	148.84
4	Matteo Rizzo	Italy	226.67	5	77.72	2	148.95
5	Nika Egadze	Georgia	217.64	3	82.82	5	134.82
6	Luc Economides	France	197.41	6	64.83	6	132.58
7	Dinh Tran	United States	186.14	8	60.53	7	125.61
8	Emanuele Indelicato	Italy	161.00	7	61.40	10	99.60
9	David Sedej	Slovenia	153.86	11	51.31	8	103.97
10	Mykhailo Rudkovskyi	Ukraine	153.35	10	50.85	9	102.50
WD	Samuel McAllister	Ireland	withdrew	9	54.00	withdrew from competition	

=== Women's singles ===
Rank	Skater	Nation	Total points	SP		FS	
1st place, gold medalist(s)	Rinka Watanabe	Japan	213.14	2	66.83	1	146.31
2nd place, silver medalist(s)	Kaori Sakamoto	Japan	205.33	1	72.93	2	132.40
3rd place, bronze medalist(s)	Ekaterina Kurakova	Poland	188.41	4	59.24	3	129.17
4	Amber Glenn	United States	177.01	8	55.99	4	121.02
5	Hanna Harrell	United States	175.55	3	60.83	5	114.72
6	Lara Naki Gutmann	Italy	168.39	7	56.46	6	111.93
7	Sarina Joos	Switzerland	161.24	11	51.31	7	109.93
8	Ting Tzu-Han	Chinese Taipei	156.35	9	53.22	8	103.13
9	Wakaba Higuchi	Japan	150.20	5	57.75	11	92.45
10	Elena Agostinelli	Italy	148.88	10	52.40	9	96.48
11	Janna Jyrkinen	Finland	136.96	14	43.29	10	93.47
12	Anna Pezzetta	Italy	134.55	6	56.71	14	77.84
13	Gerli Liinamäe	Estonia	122.82	13	46.37	15	76.45
14	Oona Ounasvuori	Finland	122.68	12	50.78	16	71.90
15	Daria Afinogenova	Lithuania	122.05	15	42.97	13	79.08
16	Nikola Rychtařiková	Czech Republic	112.54	16	31.56	12	80.98

=== Ice dance ===
Rank	Team	Nation	Total points	RD		FD	
1st place, gold medalist(s)	Charlène Guignard / Marco Fabbri	Italy	211.85	1	87.09	1	124.76
2nd place, silver medalist(s)	Allison Reed / Saulius Ambrulevičius	Lithuania	183.60	3	71.95	2	111.65
3rd place, bronze medalist(s)	Natálie Taschlerová / Filip Taschler	Czech Republic	183.55	2	75.41	3	108.14
4	Emily Bratti / Ian Somerville	United States	170.54	4	67.79	5	102.75
5	Loïcia Demougeot / Théo le Mercier	France	166.95	5	63.87	4	103.08
6	Natacha Lagouge / Arnaud Caffa	France	155.29	7	59.91	7	95.38
7	Elisabetta Leccardi / Mattia Dalla Torre	Italy	154.71	6	61.86	8	92.85
8	Victoria Manni / Carlo Röthlisberger	Italy	153.30	8	57.66	6	95.64
9	Paulina Ramanauskaitė / Deividas Kizala	Lithuania	146.38	9	55.20	9	91.18
10	Jenna Hertenstein / Damian Binkowski	Poland	130.47	10	51.21	10	79.26
11	Maria Sofia Pucherová / Nikita Lysak	Slovakia	125.42	12	47.03	11	78.39
12	Hanna Jakucs / Alessio Galli	Netherlands	117.72	11	48.68	12	69.04
