= Nikolaj Memola =

Italian figure skater (born 2003)

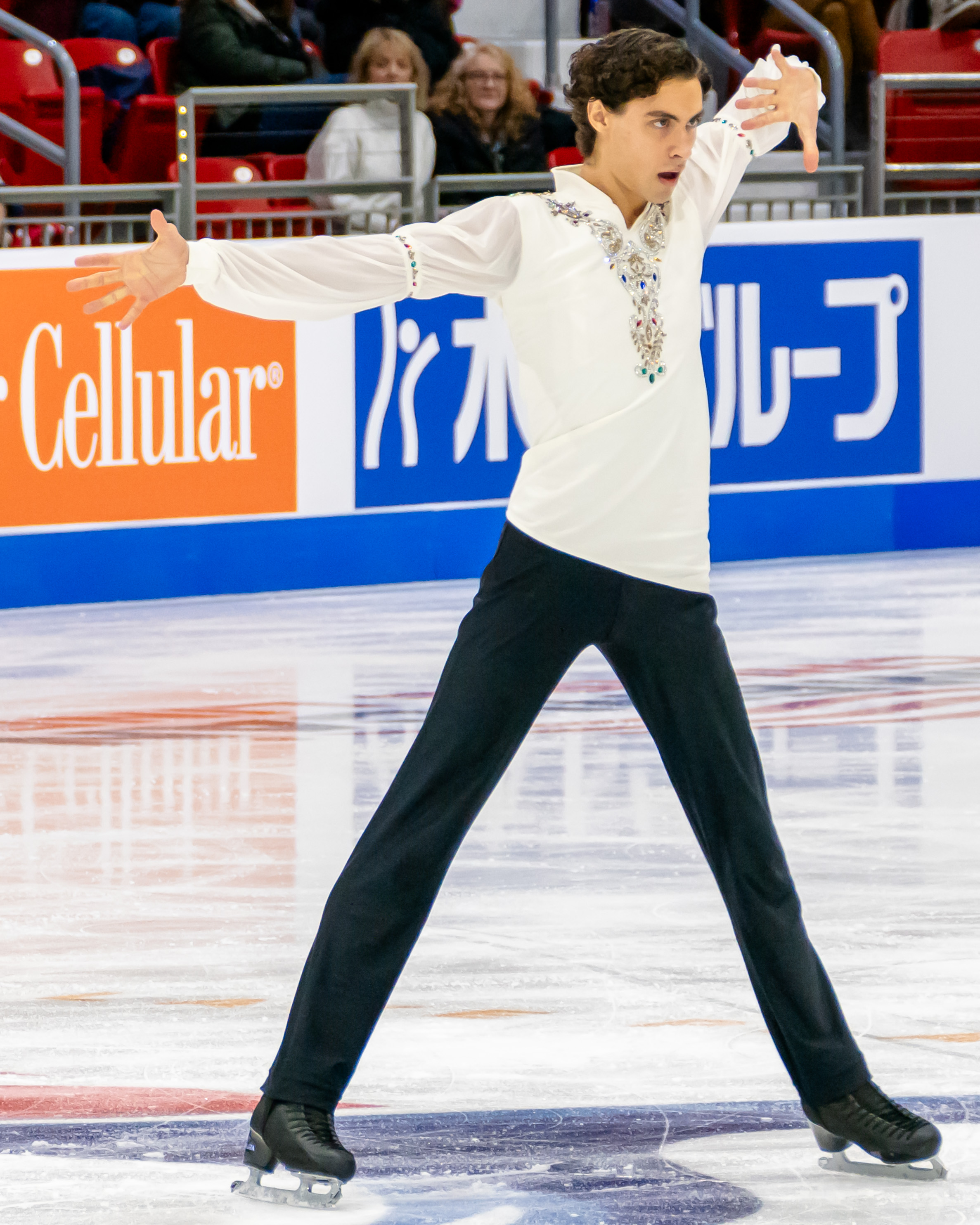
- Nikolaj Memola at the 2025 Skate America

Personal information
- Born: 18 November 2003 (age 22) Monza, Italy
- Height: 1.95 m (6 ft 5 in)

Figure skating career
- Country: Italy
- Discipline: Men's singles
- Coach: Olga Romanova
- Skating club: Fiammo Oro Moena
- Began skating: 2008

Medal record
European Championships
Silver medal – second place	2025 Tallinn	Singles
Italian Championships
Gold medal – first place	2024 Pinerolo	Singles
Silver medal – second place	2023 Brunico	Singles
Silver medal – second place	2025 Varese	Singles
World Team Trophy
Bronze medal – third place	2025 Tokyo	Team
Junior Grand Prix Final
Gold medal – first place	2022–23 Turin	Singles

Nikolaj Memola (born 18 November 2003) is an Italian figure skater. He is the 2025 European silver medalist, the 2023 World University Games bronze medalist, a five-time ISU Challenger Series medalist, and the 2024 Italian national champion.

Memola is also the 2022–23 Junior Grand Prix Final champion, a two-time ISU Junior Grand Prix medalist (including gold at the 2022 JGP Latvia), and has placed in the top ten finisher at the 2020 Winter Youth Olympics and the 2022 and 2023 World Junior Figure Skating Championships.

== Personal life ==
Memola was born on November 18, 2003, in Monza, Italy, to an Italian father and a Russian mother. He has an older sister, Anna.

He is a student at the University of Milan.

== Career ==
=== Early years ===
Memola began learning to skate in 2008. He is coached by his mother, Olga Romanova.

He debuted in the ISU Junior Grand Prix (JGP) series in October 2018, finishing nineteenth in Slovenia. He competed at the 2020 Winter Youth Olympics in Lausanne, Switzerland, where he placed eighth.

=== 2021–22 season: Junior national title and senior debut ===
Memola finished fourth at the 2021 JGP Austria in October 2021. He made his senior international debut later that month, placing fourth at Trophée Métropole Nice Côte d'Azur. In November, he finished ninth at the 2021 Warsaw Cup, his first appearance in the Challenger series. In December, he won his first senior international medal, taking gold at the Santa Claus Cup in Hungary.

Following the withdrawal of Matteo Rizzo, Italy selected Memola to skate at the 2022 European Championships in Tallinn, Estonia. Competing in his first ISU Championship, he qualified for the final segment by placing twelfth in the short program and finished fifteenth overall. He made his debut appearance at the World Junior Championships, where he placed seventh.

=== 2022–23 season: Junior Grand Prix Final gold ===
Planning a split season between junior and senior levels, Memola competed in two Junior Grand Prix events, winning silver at the 2022 JGP Czech Republic and gold at the 2022 JGP Latvia. His results qualified him for the 2022–23 Junior Grand Prix Final.He indicated satisfaction that the event would be held in Italy and expressed the intention to introduce a quadruple jump in the free skate. Returning to the Challenger series, Memola won bronze medals at both the Lombardia and Budapest Trophies.

Competing at the Junior Grand Prix Final in Turin, Memola finished second in the short program. He won the free skate and the gold medal, without attempting a quadruple jump. This was the first Junior Grand Prix Final title for an Italian man and Italy's first title in any discipline since the ice dance team Faiella/Milo in the inaugural 1997–98 season.

Shortly after the Junior Grand Prix Final, Memola competed at his first senior Italian Championships and won the silver medal, placing first in the free skate. He was subsequently assigned to 2023 Winter World University Games, where he won the bronze medal.

In his final assignment of the season, Memola competed at the 2023 World Junior Championships. After stepping out of his jump combination in the short program, he finished sixth in that segment. He placed fourth in the free skate and fourth overall, 1.35 points behind bronze medalist Nozomu Yoshioka. Memola did not attempt any quadruple jumps in the free skate, citing inconsistency in practice.

=== 2023–24 season: Senior national title ===
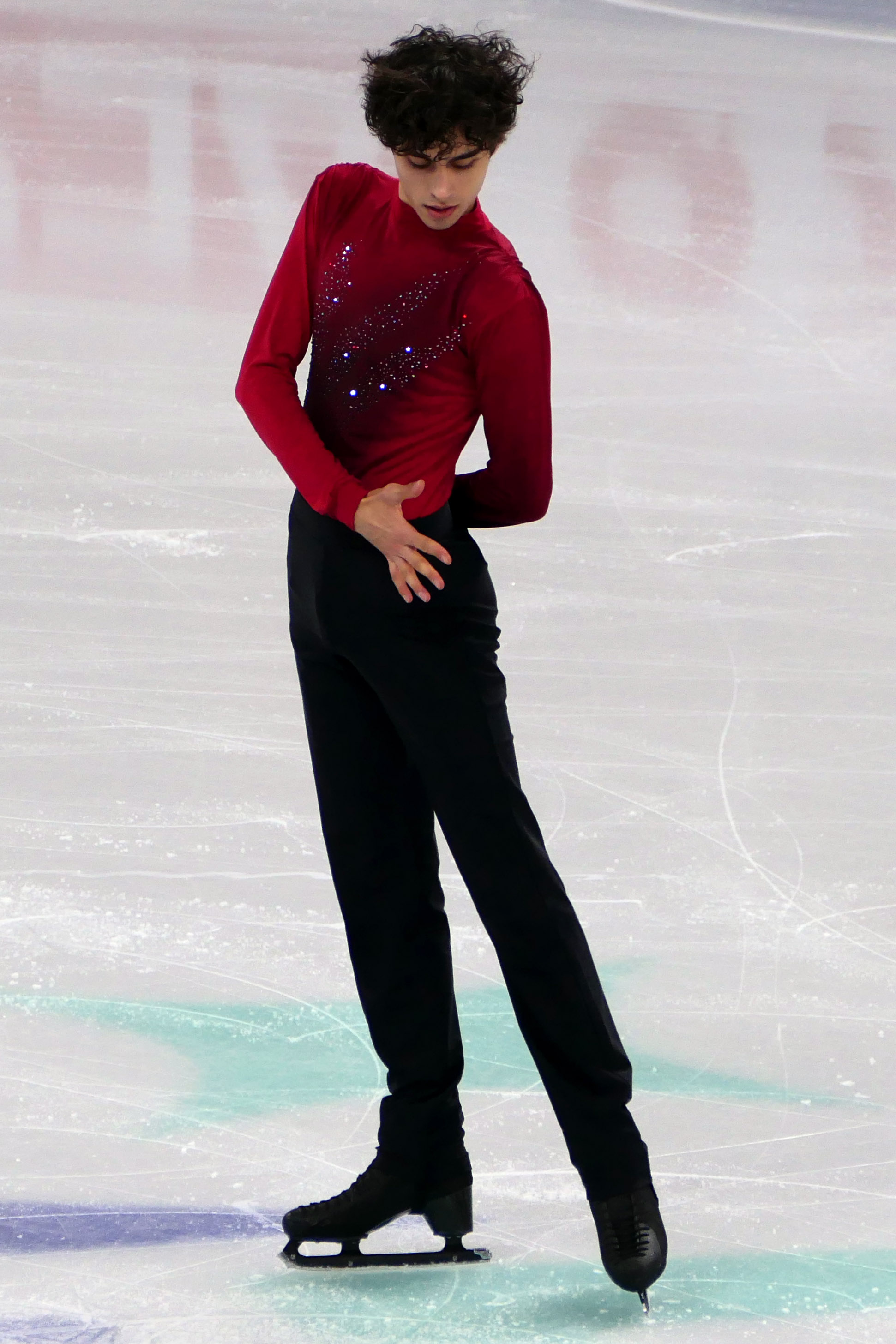
Memola during his short program at the 2024 World Championships

Over the summer, Memola trained at the Toronto Cricket, Skating and Curling Club in Toronto, Ontario. In his first competition of the season, he finished eighth at the 2023 Autumn Classic International and sixth at the 2023 Finlandia Trophy. He made his Grand Prix debut at the 2023 Grand Prix de France, where he placed eleventh and later finished sixth at the 2023 Grand Prix of Espoo. He commented on the level of competition in the men's field.

Memola won the Italian national title for the first time. He placed tenth at the 2024 European Championship and then made his senior World Championship debut at the 2024 event in Montreal, finishing ninth. He described reaching top ten in his first appearance at the championships as significant and noted that the result secured Italy a second entry in the men's event for the following year.

=== 2024–25 season: European silver ===
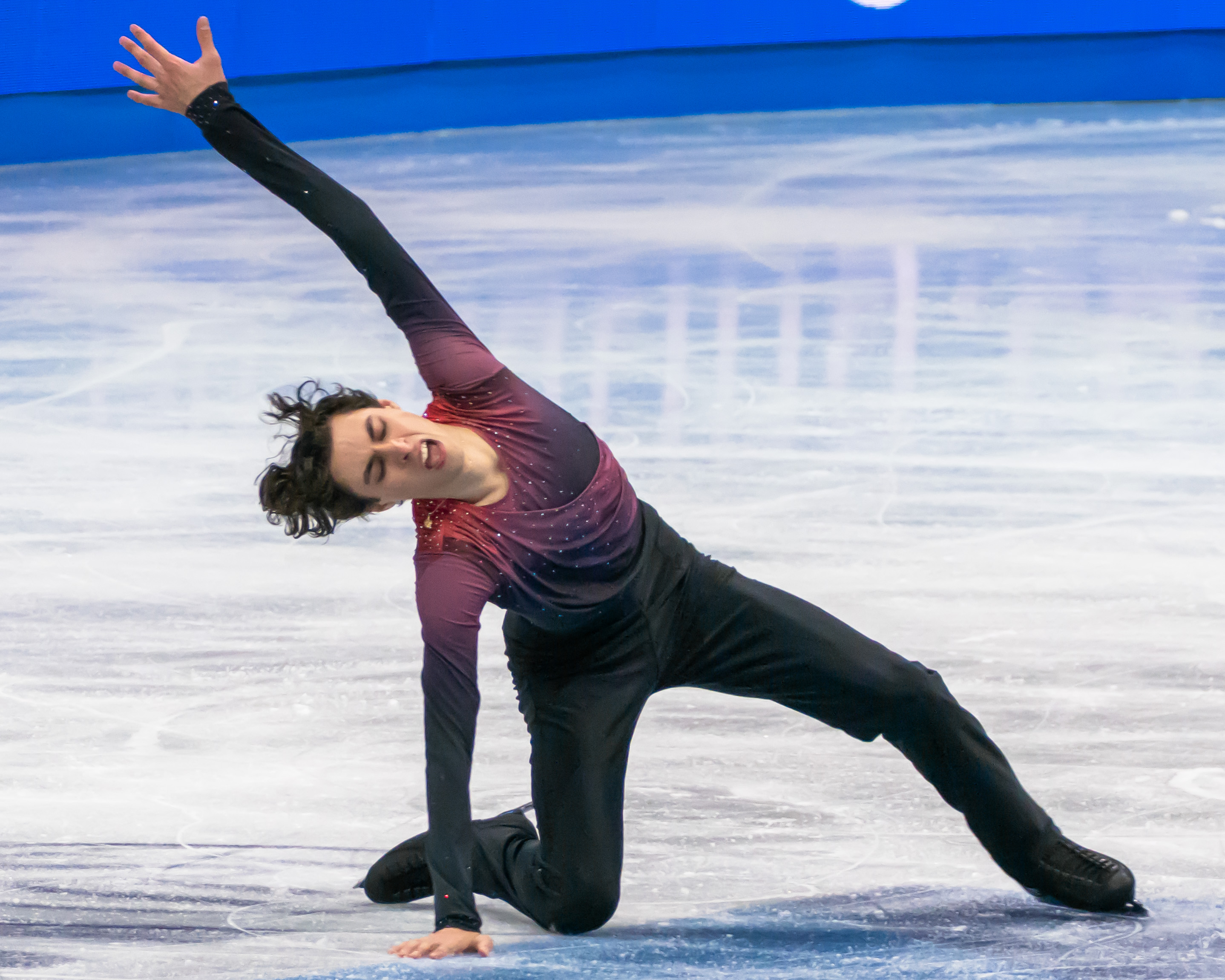
Memola performing his free skate at the 2025 World Championships

During the summer off-season, Memola sustained multiple injuries, including two torn ligaments and a broken ankle. As a result, he resumed jump training in September.

Memola began the season at the 2024 Shanghai Trophy in early October, finishing fourth. He then competed on the 2024–25 ISU Challenger Series, winning silver at the 2024 Nepela Memorial. On the 2024–25 Grand Prix circuit, he finished tenth in the short program and second in the free skate at the 2024 Grand Prix de France, placing sixth overall. Three weeks later, he finished tenth at the 2024 Cup of China.

In January, Memola competed at the 2025 European Championships. He was fifth after the short program and moved to second overall after landing two quadruple Lutz jumps in the free skate, winning the silver medal. He described the performance as his best to date.

In March, at the 2025 World Championships in Boston, he finished tenth following a free skate that was otherwise clean except for an error on his second quadruple Lutz. His placement secured Italy two quotas for the men's event at the 2026 Winter Olympics.

Selected to compete for Team Italy at the 2025 World Team Trophy, Memola placed tenth in the men's singles event, and Italy won the bronze medal overall.

=== 2025–26 season: Struggles with injury and theft ===
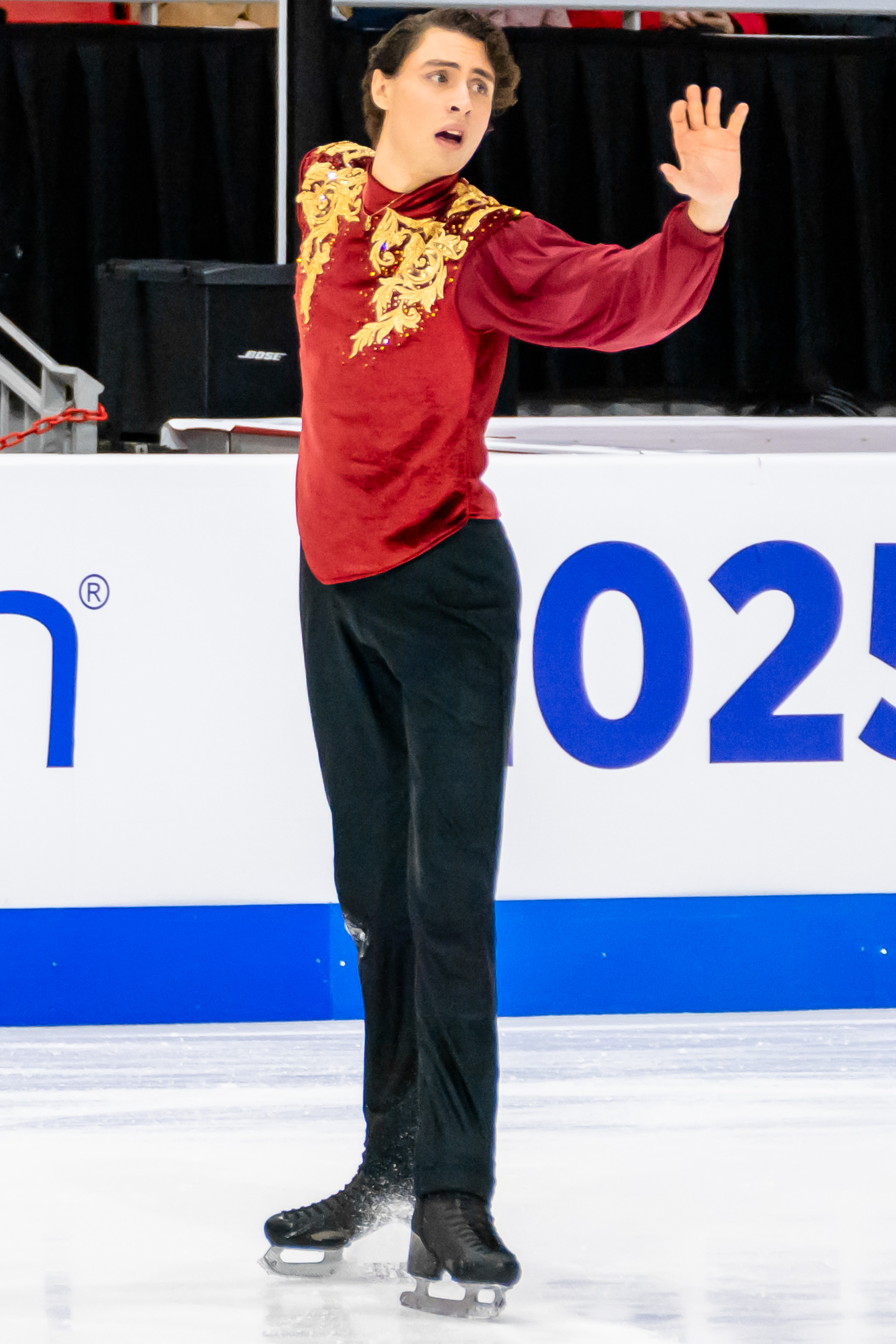
Memola performing his short program at 2025 Skate America

Memola opened the season on the 2025–26 Challenger Series, winning bronze at the 2025 CS Lombardia Trophy and finishing eighth at the 2025 CS Nepela Memorial. He then competed on the 2025–26 Grand Prix circuit, placing sixth at the 2025 Skate Canada International and seventh at 2025 Skate America.

In late November, at an Italian domestic event, Memola fell on a quadruple Lutz attempt in the short program and withdrew due to pelvic pain. He underwent medical evaluation. During this period, his car was broken into, and personal belongings, including his skates and short program costume, were stolen. He later reported financial losses from the incident.

Due to the severity of the pelvic injury, Memola was unable to train for approximately one month and withdrew from the 2026 Italian Championships. He was subsequently named to compete at the 2026 European Championship team.

Memola returned to training in late December, shortly before the European Championships, and competed while managing ongoing pain from his injury. He placed tenth in the short program and ninth at the free skate, finishing eleventh overall. The second Olympic men's singles berth for Italy was awarded to Matteo Rizzo, who won the silver medal at the event.

=== 2026–27 season ===
Memola opened the new season on the Grand Prix series; competing at the 2026 Grand Prix de France, Memola concluded the event in ninth place overall.

== Programs ==
Season	Short program	Free skate	Exhibition	Ref.
2018–19	Sarabande Suite By Globus Choreo. by Andrea Gilardi	Tango Amore By Edvin Marton Choreo. by Andrea Gilardi		
2019–20	Fly; Experience By Ludovico Einaudi Choreo. by Andrea Gilardi	Angels & Demons By Hans Zimmer Choreo. by Andrea Gilardi		
2021–22	Le Corsaire By Adolphe Adam Choreo. by Corrado Giordani	Modigliani By Guy Farley; Le di a la caza alcance By Estrella Morente; Memorial Requiem By Michael Nyman Choreo. by Corrado Giordani		
2022–23	Prelude in C-sharp minor By Sergei Rachmaninoff Choreo. by Corrado Giordani & Nikolaj Memola	Dieu! Dieu d'Israel (from Samson and Delilah) By Camille Saint-Saëns; I Belong To You By Muse; Bacchanale (from Samson and Delilah) By Camille Saint-Saëns Choreo. by Corrado Giordani & Nikolaj Memola	Le Corsaire; Frida; Alcoba Azul By Lila Downs; Burn It Blue By Caetano Veloso & Lila Downs	
2023–24	Prelude in C-sharp minor By Sergei Rachmaninoff Choreo. by Corrado Giordani & Nikolaj Memola	Dieu! Dieu d'Israel (from Samson and Delilah) By Camille Saint-Saëns; I Belong To You By Muse; Bacchanale (from Samson and Delilah) By Camille Saint-Saëns Choreo. by Corrado Giordani & Nikolaj Memola	Le Corsaire; Frida; Alcoba Azul By Lila Downs; Burn It Blue By Caetano Veloso & Lila Downs	
2024–25	Nyah (from Mission: Impossible 2) By Hans Zimmer Choreo. by Barbara Fusar-Poli	Mon Dieu By Édith Piaf Performed by Patricia Kaas; Song for the Little Sparrow By Abel Korzeniowski Performed by Patricia Kaas Choreo. by Corrado Giordani; Modigliani	Adiós Nonino; Invierno Porteño By Astor Piazzolla; Exogenesis: Symphony Part 3: Redemption By Muse	
2025–26	Tosca By Giacomo Puccini; S. 69, Act III: E lucevan le stelle - Execution & Finale Performed by Academy of St Martin in the Fields & Neville Marriner; E lucevan le stelle Performed by Luciano Pavarotti, Orchestra of the Royal Opera House, Covent Garden, & Edward Downes Choreo. by Barabara Fusar-Poli; Prelude in C-sharp minor	Scheherazade By Nikolai Rimsky-Korsakov; Op. 35: 1. Largo e maestoso; Op. 35: III. Andantino quasi allegretto Performed by Berliner Philharmoniker, Lorin Maazel, & Leon Spierer Choreo. by Barbara Fusar-Poli; Samson and Delilah		

== Competitive highlights ==
- GP – Event of the ISU Grand Prix Series
- JGP – Event of the ISU Junior Grand Prix Series
- CS – Event of the ISU Challenger Series
- TBD – Assigned
- WD – Withdrew from competition

Competition placements at senior level
Season	2021–22	2022–23	2023–24	2024–25	2025–26	2026-27
World Championships			9th	10th		
European Championships	15th		10th	2nd	11th	
Italian Championships		2nd	1st	2nd		
World Team Trophy				3rd (10th)		
GP Cup of China				10th		
GP Finland			5th			
GP France			11th	6th		9th
GP Skate America					7th	12th
GP Skate Canada					6th	
CS Autumn Classic			8th			
CS Budapest Trophy		3rd	1st			
CS Finlandia Trophy			6th			
CS Lombardia Trophy		3rd			3rd	
CS Nepela Memorial				2nd	8th	
CS Warsaw Cup	9th					
Merano Ice Trophy			1st			
Road to 26 Trophy				2nd		
Santa Claus Cup	1st					
Shanghai Trophy				4th		
Trophée Métropole Nice	4th					
World University Games		3rd				

Competition placements at junior level
Season	2017–18	2018–19	2019–20	2020–21	2021–22	2022–23
Winter Youth Olympics			8th			
World Junior Championships					7th	4th
Junior Grand Prix Final						1st
Italian Championships	4th	2nd	2nd	2nd	1st	
JGP Austria					4th	
JGP Czech Republic						2nd
JGP Italy			16th			
JGP Latvia			18th			1st
JGP Slovenia		19th				
Crystal Skate of Romania	1st					
Cup of Tyrol		3rd				
Dragon Trophy	4th					
Egna Spring Trophy	3rd	1st		1st		
European Youth Olympic Festival		11th				
IceLab Cup			2nd			
Merano Cup	6th					
Skate Celje	3rd					
Skate Victoria		2nd				
Sofia Trophy			2nd			

== Detailed results ==
ISU personal best scores in the +5/-5 GOE System
Segment	Type	Score	Event
Total	TSS	265.37	2025 CS Lombardia Trophy
Short program	TSS	93.10	2024 World Championships
Short program	TES	53.38	2024 World Championships
Short program	PCS	40.26	2025 World Championships
Free skating	TSS	177.69	2025 European Championships
Free skating	TES	98.96	2025 CS Lombardia Trophy
Free skating	PCS	80.39	2024 World Championships

=== Senior level ===
Results in the 2021–22 season
Date	Event	SP		FS		Total	
Date	Event	P	Score	P	Score	P	Score
Oct 20–24, 2021	(France) 2021 Trophée Métropole Nice Côte d'Azur	3	72.36	2	130.73	4	203.09
Nov 17–20, 2021	(Poland) 2021 CS Warsaw Cup	12	69.59	7	142.00	9	211.59
Dec 6–12, 2021	(Hungary) 2021 Santa Claus Cup	1	78.00	1	150.35	1	228.35
Jan 10–16, 2022	(Estonia) 2022 European Championships	12	73.98	14	132.55	15	206.53

Results in the 2022–23 season
Date	Event	SP		FS		Total	
Date	Event	P	Score	P	Score	P	Score
Sep 16–19, 2022	(Italy) 2022 CS Lombardia Trophy	4	81.68	3	148.84	3	230.52
Oct 13–16, 2022	(Hungary) 2022 CS Budapest Trophy	3	78.78	4	152.69	3	231.47
Dec 15–18, 2022	(Italy) 2023 Italian Championships	3	80.32	1	161.37	2	241.69
Jan 13–15, 2023	(United States) 2023 Winter World University Games	4	78.96	4	152.37	3	231.33

Results in the 2023–24 season
Date	Event	SP		FS		Total	
Date	Event	P	Score	P	Score	P	Score
Sep 14–17, 2023	(Canada) 2023 CS Autumn Classic International	8	70.27	7	129.11	8	199.38
Oct 4–8, 2023	(Finland) 2023 CS Finlandia Trophy	3	82.03	8	140.95	6	222.98
Oct 13–15, 2023	(Hungary) 2023 CS Budapest Trophy	1	88.99	2	161.38	1	250.37
Nov 3–5, 2023	2023 Grand Prix de France	12	70.92	9	143.71	11	214.63
Nov 17–19, 2023	(Finland) 2023 Grand Prix of Espoo	7	72.11	5	149.14	5	221.25
Dec 22–23, 2023	(Italy) 2024 Italian Championships	2	90.70	1	157.98	1	248.68
Jan 10–14, 2024	(Lithuania) 2024 European Championships	12	72.78	9	153.10	10	225.88
Feb 23-25, 2024	(Italy) 2024 Merano Ice Trophy	1	89.41	1	166.83	1	256.24
Mar 18–24, 2024	(Canada) 2024 World Championships	6	93.10	12	160.02	9	253.12

Results in the 2024–25 season
Date	Event	SP		FS		Total	
Date	Event	P	Score	P	Score	P	Score
Oct 3–5, 2024	(China) 2024 Shanghai Trophy	6	74.47	3	156.44	4	230.91
Oct 25–27, 2024	(Slovakia) 2024 CS Nepela Memorial	4	76.27	2	157.15	2	233.42
Nov 1–3, 2024	2024 Grand Prix de France	10	68.71	2	158.91	6	227.62
Nov 22–24, 2024	2024 Cup of China	10	68.87	10	145.90	10	214.77
Dec 19–21, 2024	(Italy) 2025 Italian Championships	3	86.32	1	178.22	2	264.54
Jan 28 – Feb 2, 2025	(Estonia) 2025 European Championships	5	84.92	2	177.69	2	262.61
Feb 18–20, 2025	(Italy) Road to 26 Trophy	1	89.10	2	165.11	2	254.21
Mar 25–30, 2025	(United States) 2025 World Championships	7	87.89	11	167.24	10	255.13
Apr 17–20, 2025	(Japan) 2025 World Team Trophy	11	69.20	8	158.17	3 (10)	227.37

Results in the 2025–26 season
Date	Event	SP		FS		Total	
Date	Event	P	Score	P	Score	P	Score
Sep 11–14, 2025	(Italy) 2025 CS Lombardia Trophy	4	88.15	3	177.22	3	265.37
Sep 25–27, 2025	(Slovakia) 2025 CS Nepela Memorial	5	79.63	8	140.42	8	220.05
Oct 31 – Nov 2, 2025	2025 Skate Canada International	6	86.45	7	151.75	6	238.20
Nov 14–16, 2025	(United States) 2025 Skate America	8	75.61	5	155.41	7	231.02
Jan 13–18, 2026	(United Kingdom) 2026 European Championships	10	77.77	9	145.75	11	223.52

Results in the 2026–27 season
Date	Event	SP		FS		Total	
Date	Event	P	Score	P	Score	P	Score
Oct 23–25, 2026	2026 Grand Prix de France	10	69.54	8	140.91	9	210.45
Nov 13–15, 2026	(United States) 2026 Skate America	12	63.46	8	141.94	12	205.40

=== Junior level ===
Results in the 2017–18 season
Date	Event	SP		FS		Total	
Date	Event	P	Score	P	Score	P	Score
Oct 24–28, 2017	(Romania) 2017 Crystal Skate	1	31.06	1	76.55	1	107.61
Nov 15–19, 2017	(Italy) 2017 Merano Cup	7	40.01	6	78.76	6	118.77
Nov 22–26, 2017	(Slovenia) 2017 Skate Celje	2	48.33	4	77.08	3	125.41
Dec 13–16, 2017	(Italy) 2018 Italian Championships (Junior)	4	49.34	4	99.01	4	148.35
Feb 8–11, 2018	(Slovenia) 2018 Dragon Trophy	4	41.25	4	72.86	4	114.11
Apr 4–8, 2018	(Italy) 2018 Egna Spring Trophy	5	42.72	3	81.43	3	124.15

Results in the 2018–19 season
Date	Event	SP		FS		Total	
Date	Event	P	Score	P	Score	P	Score
Oct 3–6, 2018	2018 JGP Slovenia	18	41.71	20	69.20	19	110.91
Dec 13–16, 2018	(Italy) 2019 Italian Championships (Junior)	2	53.08	3	84.15	2	137.23
Feb 13–14, 2019	(Bosnia and Herzegovina) 2019 European Youth Olympic Winter Festival	11	46.73	10	90.98	11	137.71
Feb 26 – Mar 3, 2019	(Austria) 2019 Cup of Tyrol	3	51.93	3	93.75	3	145.68
Mar 28–31, 2019	(Italy) 2019 Egna Spring Trophy	1	54.30	2	96.70	1	151.00
Apr 9–14, 2019	(Bulgaria) 2019 Skate Victoria	2	59.69	2	109.99	2	169.68

Results in the 2019–20 season
Date	Event	SP		FS		Total	
Date	Event	P	Score	P	Score	P	Score
Sep 4–7, 2019	2019 JGP Latvia	18	48.82	18	86.37	18	135.19
Oct 2–5, 2019	2019 JGP Italy	15	55.39	17	103.12	16	158.51
Nov 1–3, 2019	(Italy) 2019 IceLab International Cup	2	56.91	2	101.16	2	158.07
Dec 12–15, 2019	(Italy) 2020 Italian Championships (Junior)	2	64.23	2	94.58	2	158.81
Jan 10–15, 2020	(Switzerland) 2020 Winter Youth Olympics	7	62.18	8	114.37	8	176.55
Feb 12–18, 2020	(Bulgaria) 2020 Sofia Trophy	2	56.20	2	115.40	2	171.60

Results in the 2020–21 season
Date	Event	SP		FS		Total	
Date	Event	P	Score	P	Score	P	Score
Apr 9–11, 2021	(Italy) 2021 Italian Championships (Junior)	1	62.33	2	111.82	2	174.15
Apr 29 – May 2, 2021	(Italy) 2021 Egna Spring Trophy	1	68.23	2	113.87	1	182.10

Results in the 2021–22 season
Date	Event	SP		FS		Total	
Date	Event	P	Score	P	Score	P	Score
Oct 6–9, 2021	2021 JGP Austria	4	71.05	7	126.58	4	197.63
Feb 12–13, 2022	(Italy) 2022 Italian Championships (Junior)	1	78.75	1	140.96	1	219.71
Apr 13–17, 2022	(Estonia) 2022 World Junior Championships	10	71.42	6	141.52	7	212.94

Results in the 2022–23 season
Date	Event	SP		FS		Total	
Date	Event	P	Score	P	Score	P	Score
Aug 31 – Sep 3, 2022	2019 JGP Czech Republic	4	71.56	2	142.55	2	214.11
Sep 7–10, 2022	2022 JGP Latvia	1	83.04	1	142.72	1	225.76
Dec 8–11, 2022	(Italy) 2022–23 Junior Grand Prix Final	2	79.84	1	150.66	1	230.50
Feb 27 – Mar 5, 2023	(Canada) 2023 World Junior Championships	6	76.72	4	139.72	4	216.44
