= 2022–23 ISU Challenger Series =

Figure skating competition

- Type: ISU Challenger Series
- Date: September 12 – December 10, 2022
- Season: 2022–23
- Previous: 2021–22 ISU Challenger Series
- Next: 2023–24 ISU Challenger Series

The 2022–23 ISU Challenger Series was held from September to December 2022. It was the ninth season that the ISU Challenger Series, a group of senior-level international figure skating competitions, was held.

== Competitions ==
This season, the series included the following events.

Date	Event	Location	Notes	Results
September 12–16	(United States) 2022 U.S. International Classic	Lake Placid, New York, United States		Details
September 16–19	(Italy) 2022 Lombardia Trophy	Bergamo, Italy	No pairs	Details
September 21–24	(Germany) 2022 Nebelhorn Trophy	Oberstdorf, Germany		Details
September 29 – October 1	(Slovakia) 2022 Nepela Memorial	Bratislava, Slovakia	No pairs	Details
October 5–9	(Finland) 2022 Finlandia Trophy	Espoo, Finland		Details
October 13–17	(Hungary) 2022 Budapest Trophy	Budapest, Hungary	No pairs	Details
October 26–29	(Kazakhstan) 2022 Denis Ten Memorial Challenge	Almaty, Kazakhstan	No pairs	Details
November 9–13	(Austria) 2022 Ice Challenge	Graz, Austria	No pairs	Details
November 17–20	(Poland) 2022 Warsaw Cup	Warsaw, Poland		Details
December 7–10	(Croatia) 2022 Golden Spin of Zagreb	Sisak, Croatia		Details

== Requirements ==
Skaters were eligible to compete on the Challenger Series if they had reached the age of 15 before July 1, 2022.

== Medal summary ==
=== Men's singles ===
Competition	Gold	Silver	Bronze	Results
(United States) U.S. International Classic	(United States) Ilia Malinin	(France) Kevin Aymoz	(United States) Camden Pulkinen	Details
(Italy) Lombardia Trophy	(France) Adam Siao Him Fa	(Japan) Koshiro Shimada	(Italy) Nikolaj Memola	Details
(Germany) Nebelhorn Trophy	(Canada) Keegan Messing	(South Korea) Lee Si-hyeong	(Canada) Roman Sadovsky	Details
(Slovakia) Nepela Memorial	(Italy) Gabriele Frangipani	(South Korea) Cha Jun-hwan	(Latvia) Deniss Vasiļjevs	Details
(Finland) Finlandia Trophy	(South Korea) Cha Jun-hwan	(Georgia (country)) Morisi Kvitelashvili	(Sweden) Andreas Nordebäck	Details
(Hungary) Budapest Trophy|	(Italy) Matteo Rizzo	(Switzerland) Lukas Britschgi	(Italy) Nikolaj Memola	Details
(Kazakhstan) Denis Ten Memorial Challenge	(Georgia (country)) Nika Egadze	(Kazakhstan) Dias Jirenbayev	(Azerbaijan) Vladimir Litvintsev	Details
(Austria) Ice Challenge	(United States) Liam Kapeikis	(Sweden) Andreas Nordebäck	(Germany) Nikita Starostin	Details
(Poland) Warsaw Cup	(France) Kévin Aymoz	(Italy) Daniel Grassl	(Switzerland) Lukas Britschgi	Details
(Croatia) Golden Spin of Zagreb	(United States) Camden Pulkinen	(Italy) Matteo Rizzo	(Estonia) Mihhail Selevko	Details

=== Women's singles ===
Competition	Gold	Silver	Bronze	Results
(United States) U.S. International Classic	(South Korea) Kim Ye-lim	(South Korea) You Young	(Japan) Mana Kawabe	Details
(Italy) Lombardia Trophy	(Japan) Rinka Watanabe	(Japan) Kaori Sakamoto	(Poland) Ekaterina Kurakova	Details
(Germany) Nebelhorn Trophy	(Belgium) Loena Hendrickx	(South Korea) Wi Seo-yeong	(Estonia) Eva-Lotta Kiibus	Details
(Slovakia) Nepela Memorial	(United States) Isabeau Levito	(Italy) Lara Naki Gutmann	(South Korea) Lee Hae-in	Details
(Finland) Finlandia Trophy	(South Korea) Kim Ye-lim	(South Korea) Kim Chae-yeon	(Georgia (country)) Anastasiia Gubanova	Details
(Hungary) Budapest Trophy	(United States) Ava Marie Ziegler	(Switzerland) Kimmy Repond	(Estonia) Niina Petrõkina	Details
(Kazakhstan) Denis Ten Memorial Challenge	(South Korea) Kim Min-chae	(Kazakhstan) Anna Levkovets	(South Korea) Choi Da-bin	Details
(Austria) Ice Challenge	(Italy) Anna Pezzetta	(Canada) Kaiya Ruiter	(Switzerland) Kimmy Repond	Details
(Poland) Warsaw Cup	(Poland) Ekaterina Kurakova	(Switzerland) Sarina Joos	(Finland) Janna Jyrkinen	Details
(Croatia) Golden Spin of Zagreb	(United States) Lindsay Thorngren	(United States) Bradie Tennell	(Canada) Madeline Schizas	Details

=== Pairs ===
Competition	Gold	Silver	Bronze	Results
(United States) U.S. International Classic	(Italy) Rebecca Ghilardi / Filippo Ambrosini	(United States) Emily Chan / Spencer Akira Howe	(United States) Valentina Plazas / Maximiliano Fernandez	Details
(Germany) Nebelhorn Trophy	(Canada) Deanna Stellato-Dudek / Maxime Deschamps	(Germany) Alisa Efimova / Ruben Blommaert	(Germany) Annika Hocke / Robert Kunkel	Details
(Finland) Finlandia Trophy	(Germany) Annika Hocke / Robert Kunkel	(Germany) Alisa Efimova / Ruben Blommaert	(Canada) Brooke McIntosh / Benjamin Mimar	Details
(Poland) Warsaw Cup	(Australia) Anastasia Golubeva / Hektor Giotopoulos Moore	(Italy) Rebecca Ghilardi / Filippo Ambrosini	(Germany) Letizia Roscher / Luis Schuster	Details
(Croatia) Golden Spin of Zagreb	(United States) Anastasiia Smirnova / Danylo Siianytsia	(United States) Ellie Kam / Danny O'Shea	(Canada) Lia Pereira / Trennt Michaud	Details

=== Ice dance ===
Competition	Gold	Silver	Bronze	Results
(United States) U.S. International Classic	(United Kingdom) Lilah Fear / Lewis Gibson	(United States) Eva Pate / Logan Bye	(United States) Lorraine McNamara / Anton Spiridonov	Details
(Italy) Lombardia Trophy	(Italy) Charlène Guignard / Marco Fabbri	(Lithuania) Allison Reed / Saulius Ambrulevičius	(Czech Republic) Natálie Taschlerová / Filip Taschler	Details
(Germany) Nebelhorn Trophy	(United Kingdom) Lilah Fear / Lewis Gibson	(Lithuania) Allison Reed / Saulius Ambrulevičius	(Canada) Carolane Soucisse / Shane Firus	Details
(Slovakia) Nepela Memorial	(Canada) Marjorie Lajoie / Zachary Lagha	(United States) Eva Pate / Logan Bye	(France) Marie Dupayage / Thomas Nabais	Details
(Finland) Finlandia Trophy	(Canada) Laurence Fournier Beaudry / Nikolaj Sørensen	(United States) Kaitlin Hawayek / Jean-Luc Baker	(Finland) Juulia Turkkila / Matthias Versluis	Details
(Hungary) Budapest Trophy	(Canada) Marjorie Lajoie / Zachary Lagha	(France) Evgeniia Lopareva / Geoffrey Brissaud	(United States) Katarina Wolfkostin / Jeffrey Chen	Details
(Kazakhstan) Denis Ten Memorial Challenge	(Japan) Kana Muramoto / Daisuke Takahashi	(Germany) Jennifer Janse van Rensburg / Benjamin Steffan	(Hungary) Mariia Ignateva / Danijil Szemko	Details
(Austria) Ice Challenge	(United States) Emily Bratti / Ian Somerville	(France) Natacha Lagouge / Arnaud Caffa	(Canada) Lily Hensen / Nathan Lickers	Details
(Poland) Warsaw Cup	(France) Loïcia Demougeot / Théo Le Mercier	(Germany) Jennifer Janse van Rensburg / Benjamin Steffan	(France) Marie Dupayage / Thomas Nabais	Details
(Croatia) Golden Spin of Zagreb	(United States) Christina Carreira / Anthony Ponomarenko	(Lithuania) Allison Reed / Saulius Ambrulevičius	(United States) Emilea Zingas / Vadym Kolesnik	Details

=== Medal standings ===
Rank	Nation	Gold	Silver	Bronze	Total
1	United States	9	6	5	20
2	Italy	5	4	2	11
3	Canada	5	1	6	12
4	South Korea	4	5	2	11
5	France	3	3	2	8
6	Japan	2	2	1	5
7	Great Britain	2	0	0	2
8	Germany	1	4	3	8
9	Georgia	1	1	1	3
10	Poland	1	0	1	2
11	Australia	1	0	0	1
11	Belgium	1	0	0	1
13	Switzerland	0	3	2	5
14	Lithuania	0	3	0	3
15	Kazakhstan	0	2	0	2
16	Sweden	0	1	1	2
17	Estonia	0	0	3	3
18	Finland	0	0	2	2
19	Azerbaijan	0	0	1	1
19	Czech Republic	0	0	1	1
19	Hungary	0	0	1	1
19	Latvia	0	0	1	1
Totals (22 entries)		35	35	35	105

== Challenger Series rankings ==
The ISU Challenger Series rankings were formed by combining the two highest final scores of each skater or team.

=== Men's singles ===
As of December 12, 2022.

No.	Skater	Nation	First event	Score	Second event	Score	Total score
1	Kévin Aymoz	France	U.S. International Classic	236.17	Warsaw Cup	258.02	494.19
2	Lukas Britschgi	Switzerland	Budapest Trophy	239.66	Warsaw Cup	253.66	493.32
3	Matteo Rizzo	Italy	Budapest Trophy	253.34	Golden Spin of Zagreb	228.86	482.00
4	Cha Jun-hwan	South Korea	Nepela Memorial	226.32	Finlandia Trophy	253.20	479.52
5	Gabriele Frangipani	Italy	Nepela Memorial	244.57	Budapest Trophy	230.99	475.56

=== Women's singles ===
As of December 12, 2022.

No.	Skater	Nation	First event	Score	Second event	Score	Total score
1	Kim Ye-lim	South Korea	U.S. International Classic	190.64	Finlandia Trophy	213.97	404.61
2	Ekaterina Kurakova	Poland	Lombardia Trophy	188.41	Warsaw Cup	189.98	378.39
3	Lindsay Thorngren	United States	Finlandia Trophy	165.09	Golden Spin of Zagreb	196.48	361.57
4	Lee Hae-in	South Korea	Nepela Memorial	164.88	Finlandia Trophy	195.72	360.60
5	Kimmy Repond	Switzerland	Budapest Trophy	177.74	Ice Challenge	169.35	347.09

=== Pairs ===
As of December 12, 2022.

No.	Team	Nation	First event	Score	Second event	Score	Total score
1	Rebecca Ghilardi / Filippo Ambrosini	Italy	U.S. International Classic	189.22	Warsaw Cup	184.21	373.43
2	Annika Hocke / Robert Kunkel	Germany	Nebelhorn Trophy	184.47	Finlandia Trophy	180.62	365.09
3	Alisa Efimova / Ruben Blommaert	Germany	Nebelhorn Trophy	186.17	Finlandia Trophy	177.11	363.28
4	Letizia Roscher / Luis Schuster	Germany	Finlandia Trophy	165.58	Warsaw Cup	170.65	336.23
5	Anastasiia Smirnova / Danylo Siianytsia	United States	Finlandia Trophy	152.88	Golden Spin of Zagreb	179.26	332.14

=== Ice dance ===
As of December 12, 2022.

No.	Team	Nation	First event	Score	Second event	Score	Total score
1	Lilah Fear / Lewis Gibson	Great Britain	U.S. International Classic	190.80	Nebelhorn Trophy	206.60	397.40
2	Marjorie Lajoie / Zachary Lagha	Canada	Nepela Memorial	193.35	Budapest Trophy	202.40	395.75
3	Allison Reed / Saulius Ambrulevičius	Lithuania	Nebelhorn Trophy	185.41	Golden Spin of Zagreb	189.47	374.88
4	Natálie Taschlerová / Filip Taschler	Czech Republic	Lombardia Trophy	183.55	Finlandia Trophy	178.85	362.40
5	Jennifer Janse van Rensburg / Benjamin Steffan	Germany	Denis Ten Memorial Challenge	177.91	Warsaw Cup	181.50	359.41

== Top scores ==
=== Men's singles ===
Top 10 best scores in the men's combined total
No.	Skater	Nation	Score	Event
1	Kévin Aymoz	France	258.02	2022 Warsaw Cup
2	Daniel Grassl	Italy	257.76	2022 Warsaw Cup
3	Ilia Malinin	United States	257.28	2022 U.S. International Classic
4	Lukas Britschgi	Switzerland	253.66	2022 Warsaw Cup
5	Matteo Rizzo	Italy	253.34	2022 Budapest Trophy
6	Cha Jun-hwan	South Korea	253.20	2022 Finlandia Trophy
7	Keegan Messing	Canada	245.74	2022 Nebelhorn Trophy
8	Gabriele Frangipani	Italy	244.57	2022 Nepela Memorial
9	Camden Pulkinen	United States	242.09	2022 Golden Spin of Zagreb
10	Adam Siao Him Fa	France	237.19	2022 Lombardia Trophy

Top 10 best scores in the men's short program
No.	Skater	Nation	Score	Event
1	Cha Jun-hwan	South Korea	91.06	2022 Finlandia Trophy
2	Kévin Aymoz	France	89.60	2022 Warsaw Cup
3	Roman Sadovsky	Canada	89.57	2022 Nebelhorn Trophy
4	Koshiro Shimada	Japan	89.18	2022 Lombardia Trophy
5	Gabriele Frangipani	Italy	87.39	2022 Nepela Memorial
6	Maxim Naumov	United States	87.11	2022 Budapest Trophy
7	Lee Si-hyeong	South Korea	86.78	2022 Nebelhorn Trophy
8	Lukas Britschgi	Switzerland	86.51	2022 Warsaw Cup
9	Camden Pulkinen	United States	85.45	2022 Golden Spin of Zagreb
10	Adam Siao Him Fa	France	84.69	2022 Lombardia Trophy

Top 10 best scores in the men's free skating
No.	Skater	Nation	Score	Event
1	Ilia Malinin	United States	185.44	2022 U.S. International Classic
2	Daniel Grassl	Italy	181.32	2022 Warsaw Cup
3	Keegan Messing	Canada	170.89	2022 Nebelhorn Trophy
4	Matteo Rizzo	Italy	170.21	2022 Budapest Trophy
5	Kévin Aymoz	France	168.42	2022 Warsaw Cup
6	Lukas Britschgi	Switzerland	167.15	2022 Warsaw Cup
7	Cha Jun-hwan	South Korea	162.14	2022 Finlandia Trophy
8	Gabriele Frangipani	Italy	160.20	2022 Budapest Trophy
9	Camden Pulkinen	United States	156.64	2022 Golden Spin of Zagreb
10	François Pitot	France	153.20	2022 Ice Challenge

=== Women's singles ===
Top 10 best scores in the women's combined total
No.	Skater	Nation	Score	Event
1	Kim Ye-lim	South Korea	213.97	2022 Finlandia Trophy
2	Rinka Watanabe	Japan	213.14	2022 Lombardia Trophy
3	Loena Hendrickx	Belgium	208.05	2022 Nebelhorn Trophy
4	Kim Chae-yeon	South Korea	205.51	2022 Finlandia Trophy
5	Kaori Sakamoto	Japan	205.33	2022 Lombardia Trophy
6	Isabeau Levito	United States	198.99	2022 Nepela Memorial
7	Anastasiia Gubanova	Georgia	197.56	2022 Finlandia Trophy
8	Lindsay Thorngren	United States	196.48	2022 Golden Spin of Zagreb
9	Lee Hae-in	South Korea	195.72	2022 Finlandia Trophy
10	Bradie Tennell	United States	193.31	2022 Golden Spin of Zagreb

Top 10 best scores in the women's short program
No.	Skater	Nation	Score	Event
1	Loena Hendrickx	Belgium	76.19	2022 Nebelhorn Trophy
2	Kaori Sakamoto	Japan	72.93	2022 Lombardia Trophy
3	Kim Ye-lim	South Korea	71.88	2022 Finlandia Trophy
4	Bradie Tennell	United States	68.84	2022 Golden Spin of Zagreb
5	Anastasiia Gubanova	Georgia	68.03	2022 Finlandia Trophy
6	Kim Chae-yeon	South Korea	67.84	2022 Finlandia Trophy
7	Rinka Watanabe	Japan	66.83	2022 Lombardia Trophy
8	Lee Hae-in	South Korea	66.00	2022 Finlandia Trophy
9	Isabeau Levito	United States	65.37	2022 Nepela Memorial
10	Madeline Schizas	Canada	64.99	2022 Nebelhorn Trophy

Top 10 best scores in the women's free skating
No.	Skater	Nation	Score	Event
1	Rinka Watanabe	Japan	146.31	2022 Lombardia Trophy
2	Kim Ye-lim	South Korea	142.09	2022 Finlandia Trophy
3	Kim Chae-yeon	South Korea	137.67	2022 Finlandia Trophy
4	Lindsay Thorngren	United States	135.99	2022 Golden Spin of Zagreb
5	Isabeau Levito	United States	133.62	2022 Nepela Memorial
6	Kaori Sakamoto	Japan	132.40	2022 Lombardia Trophy
7	Wi Seo-yeong	South Korea	131.94	2022 Nebelhorn Trophy
8	Loena Hendrickx	Belgium	131.86	2022 Nebelhorn Trophy
9	Ava Marie Ziegler	United States	130.24	2022 Budapest Trophy
10	Lee Hae-in	South Korea	129.72	2022 Finlandia Trophy

=== Pairs ===
Top 10 best scores in the pairs' combined total
No.	Team	Nation	Score	Event
1	Deanna Stellato-Dudek / Maxime Deschamps	Canada	192.74	2022 Nebelhorn Trophy
2	Rebecca Ghilardi / Filippo Ambrosini	Italy	189.22	2022 U.S. International Classic
3	Alisa Efimova / Ruben Blommaert	Germany	186.17	2022 Nebelhorn Trophy
4	Anastasia Golubeva / Hektor Giotopoulos Moore	Australia	185.53	2022 Warsaw Cup
5	Annika Hocke / Robert Kunkel	Germany	184.47	2022 Nebelhorn Trophy
6	Emily Chan / Spencer Akira Howe	United States	181.81	2022 U.S. International Classic
7	Anastasiia Smirnova / Danylo Siianytsia	United States	179.26	2022 Golden Spin of Zagreb
8	Ellie Kam / Danny O'Shea	United States	178.83	2022 Golden Spin of Zagreb
9	Sara Conti / Niccolò Macii	Italy	177.87	2022 Nebelhorn Trophy
10	Lia Pereira / Trennt Michaud	Canada	176.88	2022 Golden Spin of Zagreb

Top 10 best scores in the pairs' short program
No.	Team	Nation	Score	Event
1	Annika Hocke / Robert Kunkel	Germany	69.13	2022 Nebelhorn Trophy
2	Deanna Stellato-Dudek / Maxime Deschamps	Canada	68.08	2022 Nebelhorn Trophy
3	Alisa Efimova / Ruben Blommaert	Germany	67.05	2022 Nebelhorn Trophy
4	Rebecca Ghilardi / Filippo Ambrosini	Italy	65.79	2022 Warsaw Cup
5	Sara Conti / Niccolò Macii	Italy	64.85	2022 Nebelhorn Trophy
6	Anastasia Golubeva / Hektor Giotopoulos Moore	Australia	63.62	2022 Warsaw Cup
7	Letizia Roscher / Luis Schuster	Germany	63.11	2022 Warsaw Cup
8	Anastasiia Smirnova / Danylo Siianytsia	United States	62.44	2022 Golden Spin of Zagreb
9	Anastasiia Metelkina / Daniil Parkman	Georgia	62.15	2022 Nebelhorn Trophy
10	Ellie Kam / Danny O'Shea	United States	62.07	2022 Golden Spin of Zagreb

Top 10 best scores in the pairs' free skating
No.	Team	Nation	Score	Event
1	Deanna Stellato-Dudek / Maxime Deschamps	Canada	124.66	2022 Nebelhorn Trophy
2	Rebecca Ghilardi / Filippo Ambrosini	Italy	124.44	2022 U.S. International Classic
3	Anastasia Golubeva / Hektor Giotopoulos Moore	Australia	121.91	2022 Warsaw Cup
4	Emily Chan / Spencer Akira Howe	United States	120.10	2022 U.S. International Classic
5	Alisa Efimova / Ruben Blommaert	Germany	119.12	2022 Nebelhorn Trophy
6	Annika Hocke / Robert Kunkel	Germany	117.04	2022 Finlandia Trophy
7	Anastasiia Smirnova / Danylo Siianytsia	United States	116.82	2022 Golden Spin of Zagreb
8	Ellie Kam / Danny O'Shea	United States	116.76	2022 Golden Spin of Zagreb
9	Lia Pereira / Trennt Michaud	Canada	115.75	2022 Golden Spin of Zagreb
10	Sara Conti / Niccolò Macii	Italy	113.02	2022 Nebelhorn Trophy

=== Ice dance ===
Top 10 best scores in the combined total (ice dance)
No.	Team	Nation	Score	Event
1	Charlène Guignard / Marco Fabbri	Italy	211.85	2022 Lombardia Trophy
2	Lilah Fear / Lewis Gibson	Great Britain	206.60	2022 Nebelhorn Trophy
3	Laurence Fournier Beaudry / Nikolaj Sørensen	Canada	203.76	2022 Finlandia Trophy
4	Marjorie Lajoie / Zachary Lagha	Canada	202.40	2022 Budapest Trophy
5	Kaitlin Hawayek / Jean-Luc Baker	United States	197.45	2022 Finlandia Trophy
6	Evgeniia Lopareva / Geoffrey Brissaud	France	192.85	2022 Budapest Trophy
7	Christina Carreira / Anthony Ponomarenko	United States	191.31	2022 Golden Spin of Zagreb
8	Allison Reed / Saulius Ambrulevičius	Lithuania	189.47	2022 Golden Spin of Zagreb
9	Kana Muramoto / Daisuke Takahashi	Japan	188.30	2022 Denis Ten Memorial Challenge
10	Juulia Turkkila / Matthias Versluis	Finland	186.30	2022 Finlandia Trophy

Top 10 best scores in the rhythm dance
No.	Team	Nation	Score	Event
1	Charlène Guignard / Marco Fabbri	Italy	87.09	2022 Lombardia Trophy
2	Lilah Fear / Lewis Gibson	Great Britain	85.80	2022 Nebelhorn Trophy
3	Marjorie Lajoie / Zachary Lagha	Canada	82.09	2022 Budapest Trophy
4	Laurence Fournier Beaudry / Nikolaj Sørensen	Canada	81.83	2022 Finlandia Trophy
5	Kana Muramoto / Daisuke Takahashi	Japan	79.56	2022 Denis Ten Memorial Challenge
6	Allison Reed / Saulius Ambrulevičius	Lithuania	78.98	2022 Nebelhorn Trophy
7	Kaitlin Hawayek / Jean-Luc Baker	United States	78.90	2022 Finlandia Trophy
8	Evgeniia Lopareva / Geoffrey Brissaud	France	76.83	2022 Budapest Trophy
9	Christina Carreira / Anthony Ponomarenko	United States	76.54	2022 Golden Spin of Zagreb
10	Natálie Taschlerová / Filip Taschler	Czech Republic	75.41	2022 Lombardia Trophy

Top 10 best scores in the free dance
No.	Team	Nation	Score	Event
1	Charlène Guignard / Marco Fabbri	Italy	124.76	2022 Lombardia Trophy
2	Laurence Fournier Beaudry / Nikolaj Sørensen	Canada	121.93	2022 Finlandia Trophy
3	Lilah Fear / Lewis Gibson	Great Britain	120.80	2022 Nebelhorn Trophy
4	Marjorie Lajoie / Zachary Lagha	Canada	120.31	2022 Budapest Trophy
5	Kaitlin Hawayek / Jean-Luc Baker	United States	118.55	2022 Finlandia Trophy
6	Evgeniia Lopareva / Geoffrey Brissaud	France	116.02	2022 Budapest Trophy
7	Christina Carreira / Anthony Ponomarenko	United States	114.77	2022 Golden Spin of Zagreb
8	Allison Reed / Saulius Ambrulevičius	Lithuania	112.26	2022 Golden Spin of Zagreb
9	Juulia Turkkila / Matthias Versluis	Finland	111.95	2022 Finlandia Trophy
10	Emilea Zingas / Vadym Kolesnik	United States	110.96	2022 Golden Spin of Zagreb
