= Rinka Watanabe =

Japanese figure skater (born 2002)

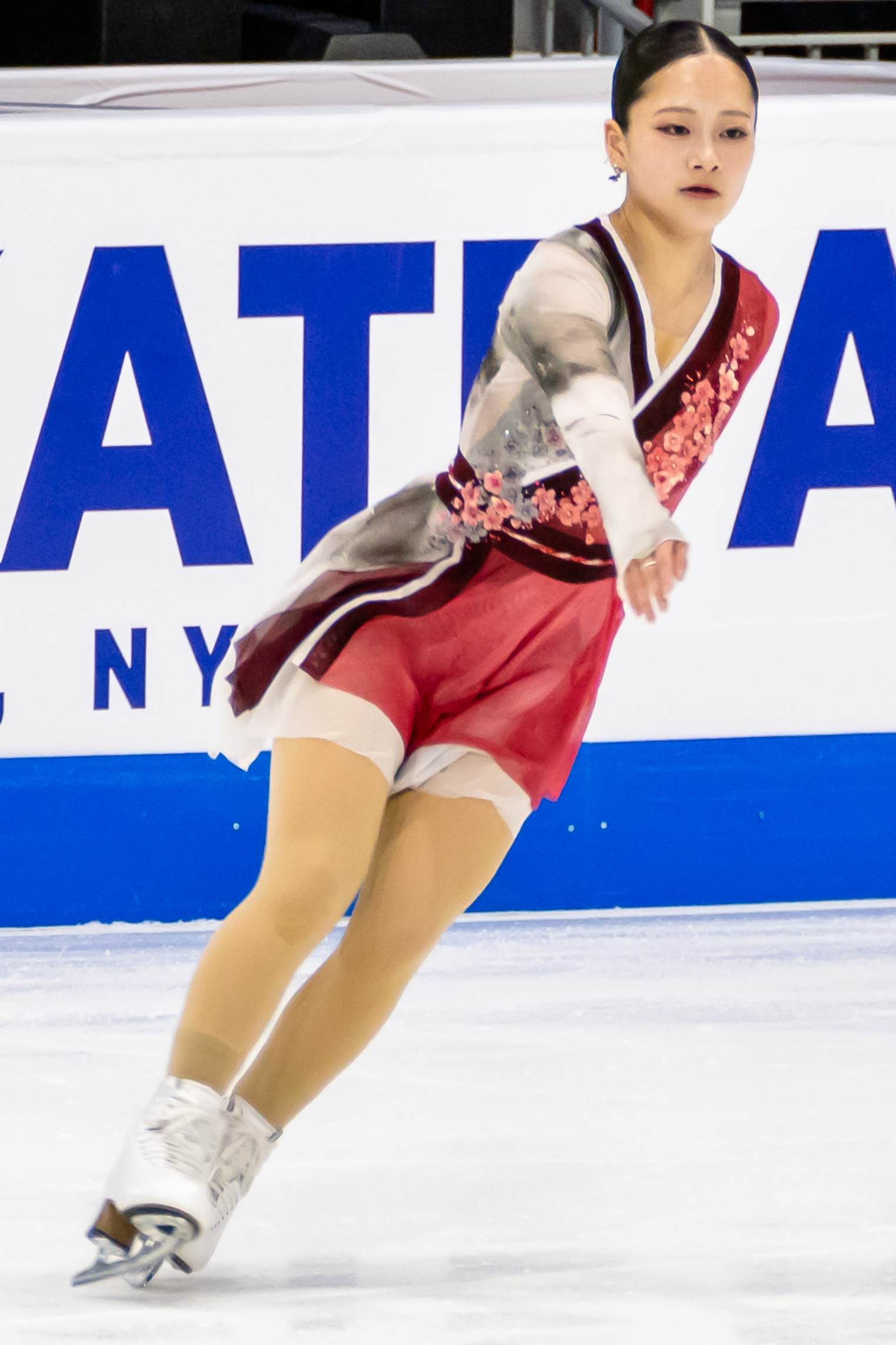
- Watanabe at 2025 Skate America

Personal information
- Native name: 渡辺倫果
- Born: 19 July 2002 (age 24) Chiba, Japan
- Home town: Chiba, Japan
- Height: 1.53 m (5 ft 0 in)

Figure skating career
- Country: Japan
- Discipline: Women's singles
- Coach: Yusuke Hayashi
- Skating club: Hosei University
- Began skating: 2006

Medal record
Four Continents Championships
Bronze medal – third place	2024 Shanghai	Singles

Rinka Watanabe (渡辺 倫果, Watanabe Rinka; born 19 July 2002) is a Japanese figure skater. She is the 2024 Four Continents bronze medalist, a four-time ISU Grand Prix medalist (1 gold, 2 silver, 1 bronze), and a two-time ISU Challenger Series medalist (1 gold, 1 silver).

== Personal life ==
Watanabe was born on 19 July 2002 in Chiba, Japan. She has three older brothers. In addition, her mother is a former competitive tennis player and long jumper.

While training in Vancouver from 2017 to 2020, Watanabe lived with a host family. While there, she learned how to speak English fluently.

In 2022, she enrolled into the Department of Commerce in the Faculty of Economics at Hosei University.

Watanabe developed an interest in giant isopods after seeing one at an aquarium while in junior high, and she has collected character figures of them since then. During the off-season, she watches anime and visits aquariums. Watanabe developed an interest in archaeology after visiting a site while recovering from an injury, and she has said she hopes to visit another site in the future. She has also said that Satoko Miyahara and Usain Bolt are people she would like to be for a day.

== Skating career ==
=== Early years ===
Watanabe began figure skating at the age of three after watching Shizuka Arakawa win gold at the 2006 Winter Olympics on TV.

After winning the 2013 Japanese national novice B gold medal, she was invited to skate in the gala at the 2013 NHK Trophy.

In 2017, Watanabe moved to Vancouver, Canada, after her longtime coach, Megumu Seki, moved from Chiba to coach there.

Given few international assignments in the early years of her junior career, she won the junior silver medal at the 2018 Bavarian Open and gold in the junior competition in the 2019 Coupe du Printemps.

Following the outbreak of the COVID-19 pandemic in 2020, the rink that Watanabe trained at in Vancouver closed down, forcing her to move her training back to Japan. Watanabe was briefly coached by Mie Hamada until the MF Figure Skating Academy opened in her hometown of Chiba in the spring of 2021. There, Kensuke Nakaniwa, Makoto Nakata, Momoe Naguma, and Aya Tanoue became her coaches.

=== 2021–2022 season ===
In her final season of international junior eligibility, Watanabe was not able to participate in the Junior Grand Prix because the Japan Skating Federation opted not to send singles skaters abroad in the fall. She finished sixth at the Japan Championships, earning international assignments for the second half of the season.

Watanabe competed in the junior division at the Bavarian Open, winning the silver medal and earning the technical minimums needed for the 2022 World Junior Championships. She then appeared at the Coupe du Printemps at the senior level, winning gold, before placing tenth at the World Junior Championships to conclude the season.

=== 2022–2023 season ===
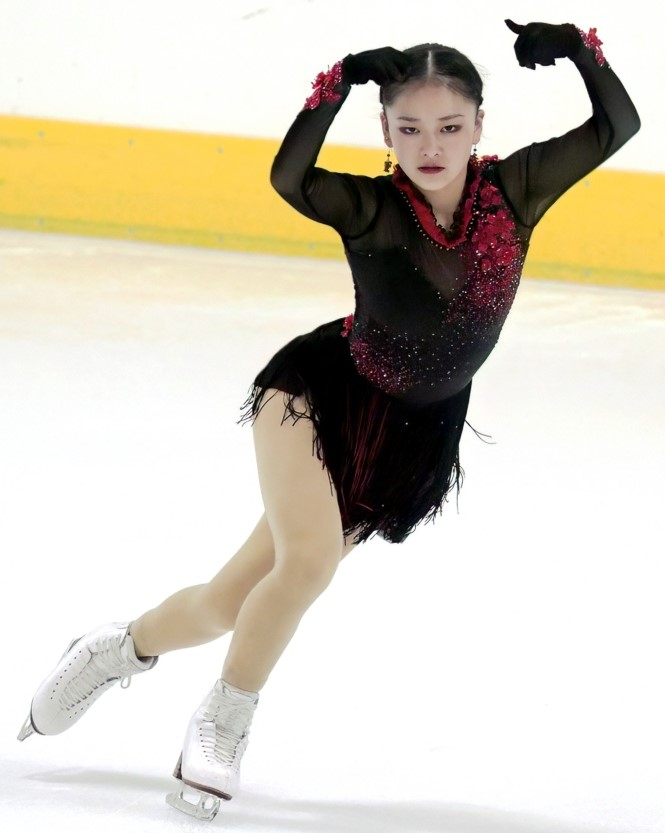
Watanabe during her short program at the 2022 CS Lombardia Trophy

Watanabe began the season by making her Challenger series debut at the 2022 CS Lombardia Trophy, where she unexpectedly won the gold over reigning World and Japanese champion Kaori Sakamoto. She also cleared the 200-point threshold for the first time internationally.

Following her success at the Lombardia Trophy, she was selected to replace Wakaba Higuchi at both of her Grand Prix assignments when the latter withdrew due to an injury. Making her Grand Prix debut at the 2022 Skate Canada International, she was considered a favourite going in but placed sixth in the short program due to rotation issues on some triple jumps. She rebounded in the free skate, winning that segment and taking the gold medal. Watanabe was pleased afterward, noting, "this is my first time at the Grand Prix, and I did pretty good. I was very nervous. I was told only one week ago that I would participate, and it was hard to adjust my training." Following her win, she entered the 2022 NHK Trophy as a podium favourite but ran into trouble in the short program, where she fell on her triple Axel attempt and then singled an intended triple loop. As a result, she placed ninth in the segment, almost ten points behind third-place Rion Sumiyoshi. She rallied in the free skate, landing a slightly underrotated triple Axel and placing third in that segment, and rose to fifth overall, 5.05 points behind bronze medalist Sumiyoshi.

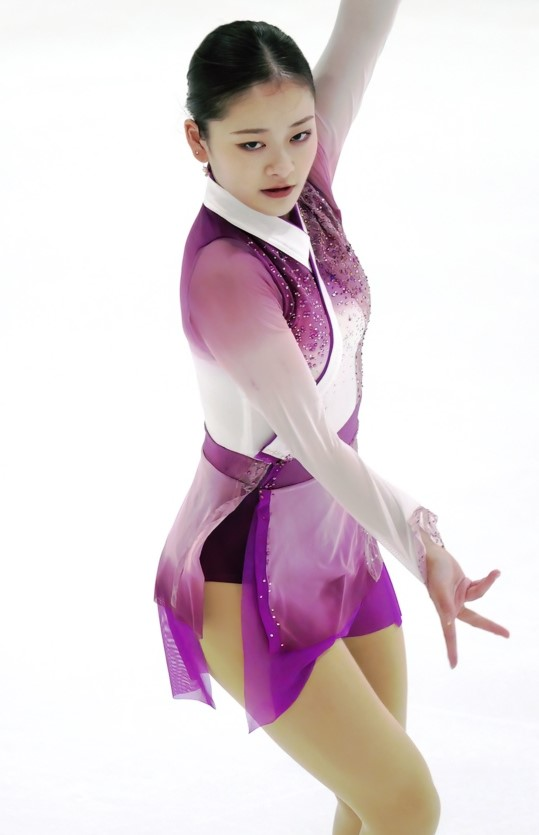
Watanabe during her free skate at the 2022 CS Lombardia Trophy

Watanabe's results on the Grand Prix qualified her for the Grand Prix Final in Turin, one of three Japanese women attending, alongside Kaori Sakamoto and Mai Mihara. She finished fourth in the short program after her triple Axel attempt was called a quarter underrotated. In a "turbulent" free skate segment that saw many skaters underperform markedly, Watanabe finished third in that segment and very narrowly fourth overall, only 0.34 points behind bronze medalist Loena Hendrickx of Belgium. Assessing the Final, she said she "liked the overall experience and hope to come back to another".

Watanabe struggled in the short program of the 2022–23 Japan Championships, coming eighteenth in that segment. She rose to twelfth place after the free skate. Despite this poor showing at the national championship, her international results earned her assignments to the 2023 Four Continents and 2023 World Championships.

At the Four Continents Championship in Colorado Springs, errors saw Watanabe place eighth in the short program. In the free skate, she was one of only three skaters to attempt a triple Axel, and the only one to land it cleanly, though she made errors on both attempted triple Lutz jumps. Fourth in that segment, she moved up to fifth overall. At the World Championships, held on home ice in Saitama, Watanabe placed fifteenth in the short program, but rose to tenth overall with a seventh-place free skate. She expressed that her desire during her competitive career was to challenge herself "to the limit."

During the off-season, Watanabe was cast to play Tony Tony Chopper in the summer show One Piece on Ice.

=== 2023–2024 season ===
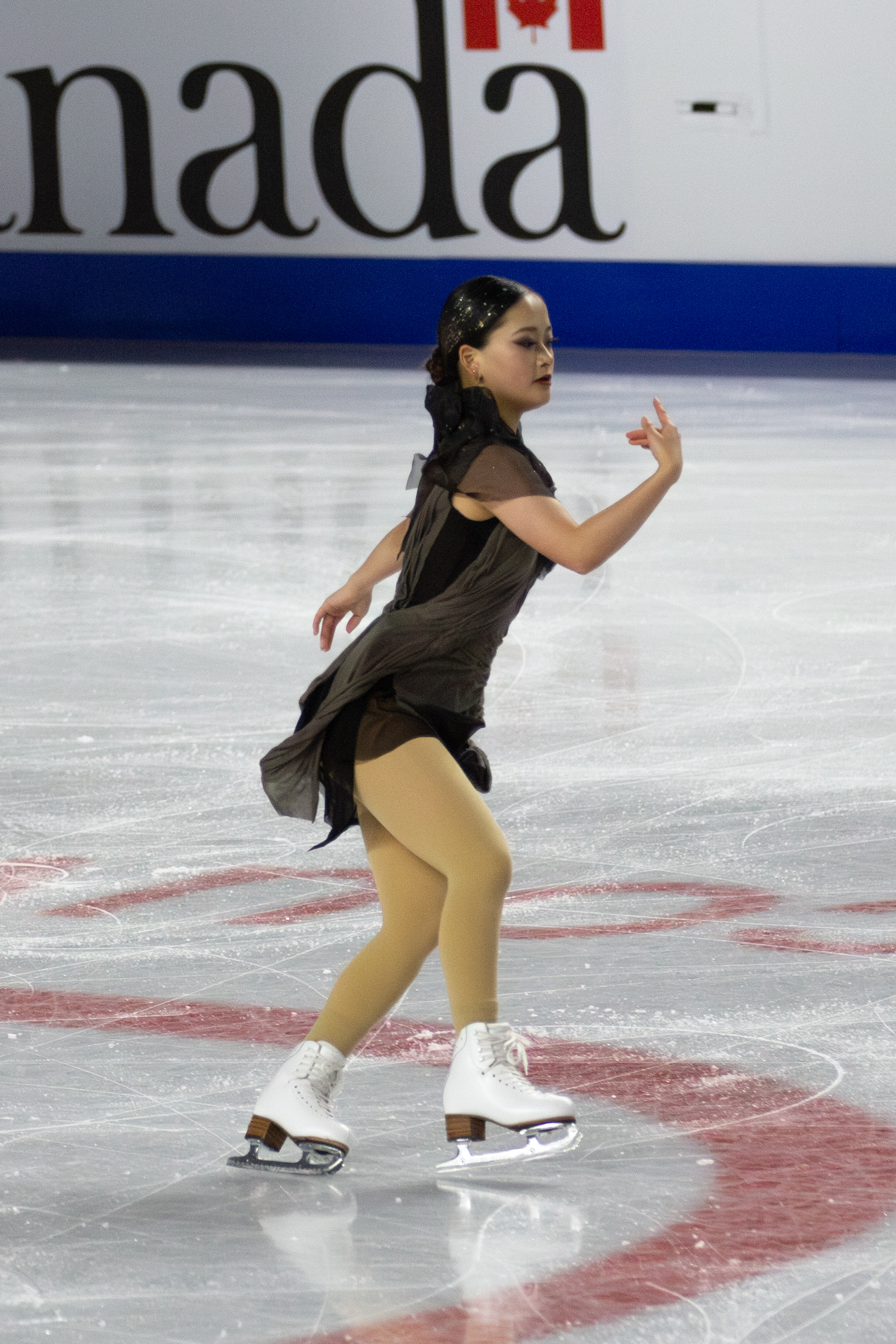
Watanabe during her free skate at 2023 Skate Canada International

Watanabe chose as the thematic subject of her free program "the dark times and struggles with injuries" of her junior career. In her first international competition of the season, she won the silver medal at the 2023 CS Finlandia Trophy in her first appearance of the season.

On the flight to Vancouver for the 2023 Skate Canada International, her first Grand Prix assignment, she watched Avatar: The Way of Water, whose score was the source of her short program music. She subsequently said she felt that understanding the story made her step sequence "more powerful." Watanabe fell on her triple loop attempt in the short program, placing seventh in the segment. She made only one mistake in the free skate, singling a planned triple Lutz, rising to sixth overall.

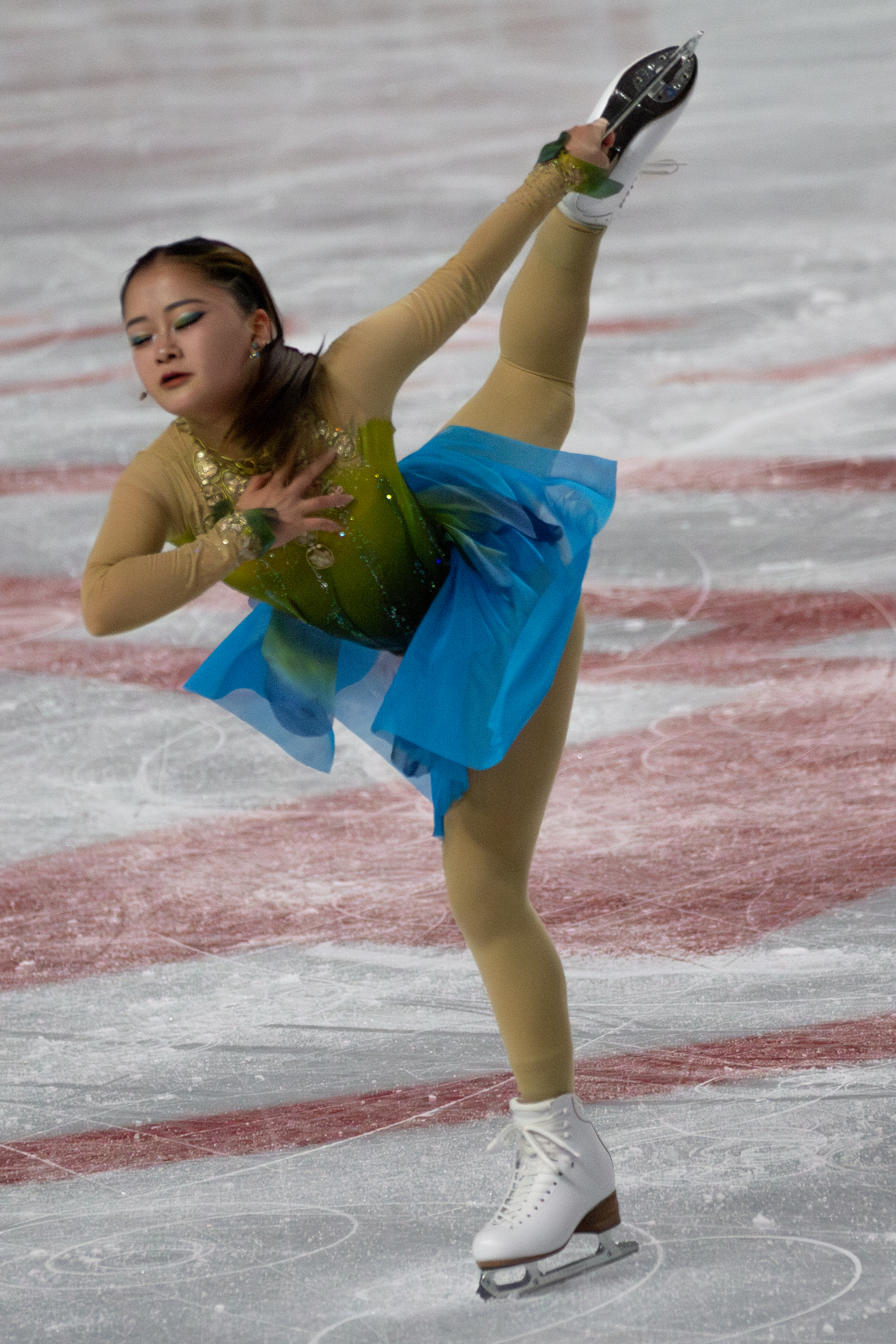
Watanabe during her short program at 2023 Skate Canada International

She finished second in the short program at the 2023 Cup of China despite slight underrotation calls on both parts of her jump combination, setting a new season's best score of 65.09. She was second in the free skate as well, winning the silver medal and finishing only 0.75 points behind gold medalist Hana Yoshida. Watanabe said she had been "very regretful" of her performance in Vancouver, adding "today I feel better because I worked so hard."

Watanabe revised her training regimen in advance of the 2023–24 Japan Championships, where she placed sixth. Despite her national result, she was assigned to the Japanese team for the 2024 Four Continents Championships, where she finished narrowly fourth in the short program, 1.03 points behind American Ava Marie Ziegler in third place, after her jump combination received quarter underrotation calls on both parts. In the free skate Watanabe successfully landed the triple Axel and five other triple jumps, but had two jumps called underrotated. She finished second in the segment and moved up to third place overall, surpassing Ziegler by 1.02 points for the bronze medal. Watanabe also revealed that she has been working on the quad loop and will continue to focus on it during the off season.

=== 2024–2025 season ===
Watanabe began the season with an eighth-place finish at the 2024 CS Lombardia Trophy. Going on to compete on the 2024–25 Grand Prix series, Watanabe won the silver medal at 2024 Skate America behind teammate Wakaba Higuchi. "I am very happy about winning a medal here," she later told the press. "I still think I could have done a bit better. I decided last night that I preferred to play it safe and not risk the triple Axel here."

At her second event, the 2024 Cup of China, she was fourth in the short program. In the free skate, she landed a triple Axel, which was judged to be a quarter under-rotated, but fell on two jumps in the second half of the program. She finished in fifth place in the free skate and fell to fifth overall. Watanabe said that she was frustrated by her performance, as she had aimed to skate cleanly in both programs, and that she had run out of stamina during the free skate. She also said that looking forward to the Japan Figure Skating Championships in December, she hoped to plan a triple Axel in both her short and free programs. Watanabe was ultimately named as the first alternate for the 2024–25 Grand Prix Final.

In December, Watanabe placed seventh at the 2024–25 Japan Championships. She then finished the season by winning gold at the 2025 International Challenge Cup.

=== 2025–26 season ===
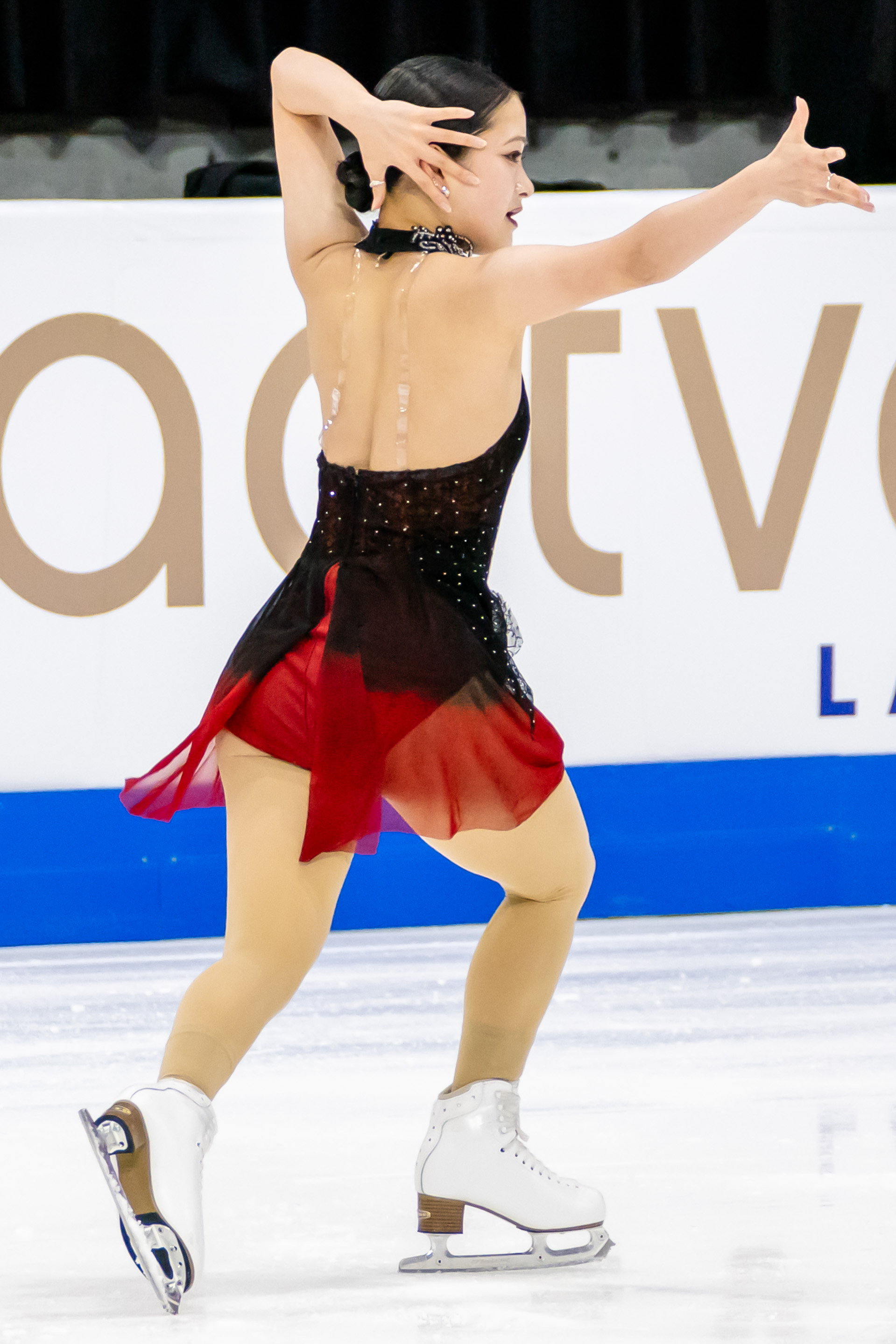
Watanabe performing her short program at 2025 Skate America

Watanabe opened her season by competing on the 2025–26 Challenge Series, finishing fourth at the 2025 CS Kinoshita Group Cup and seventh at the 2025 CS Trialeti Trophy. She then went on to compete on the 2025–26 Grand Prix circuit, winning the bronze medal at the 2025 Cup of China. "Winning a medal here means a lot because I don't want to give up for the Grand Prix Final yet," she said. "I will have to do great at the next one in America."

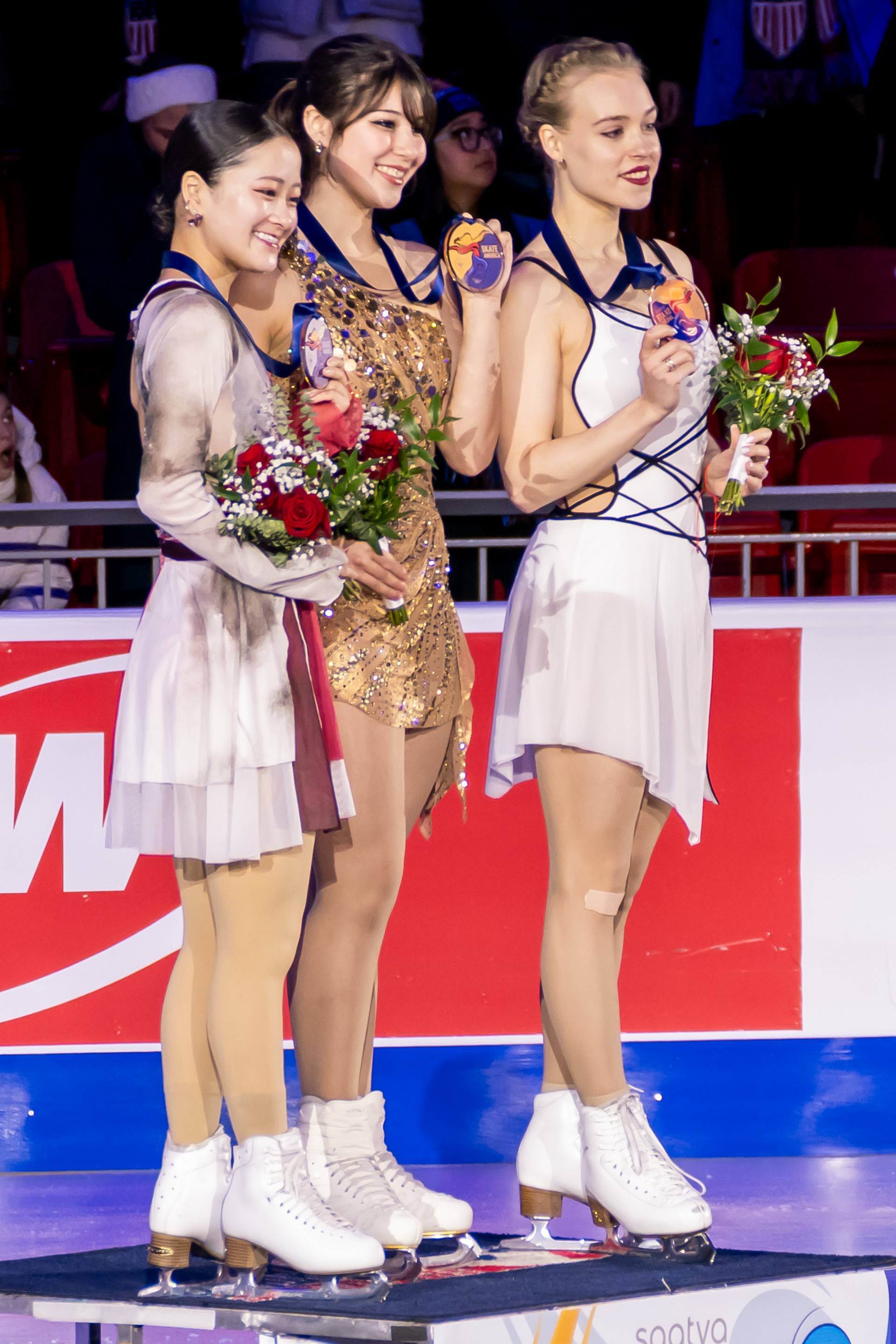
2025 Skate America victory ceremony alongside medalists: Alysa Liu (middle) and Anastasiia Gubanova (right)

A couple weeks later, Watanabe competed at 2025 Skate America, where she won the short program and placed third in the free skate, winning the silver medal for a second consecutive time and finishing behind defending World Champion, Alysa Liu. Following the event, she said, "I did rather well to put things together under pressure. I managed to do the things I can at this moment properly. It was huge I was able to hold on to a second place." “I don't know if my next competition is going to be nationals or if it's going to be the Final,” said Watanabe. “But regardless of whichever it is, I want to do the best that I can and whatever results from that, I hope that it could lead to future dreams coming true.” Watanabe's Grand Prix series results allowed her to qualify for the Grand Prix Final in Nagoya, Japan, where she ultimately came in sixth place. Two weeks later, she finished seventh at the 2025–26 Japan Championships and was named as the first alternate for the 2026 Winter Olympic team. Following the event, Watanabe announced her intention to continue skating competitively for another Olympic cycle.

In February, Watanabe announced that she had made a coaching change, relocating to Kurashiki, Okayama Prefecture to train under Yusuke Hayashi.

In March 2026, Watanabe competed at the Coupe du Printemps in Kockelscheuer, Luxembourg. She won the silver medal behind Mana Kawabe.

== Programs ==
Season	Short program	Free skating	Exhibition
2026–2027	Seven Nation Army by The White Stripes performed by Scott Bradlee's Postmodern Jukebox ft. Haley Reinhart choreo. by Kana Muramoto	Piano Concerto No. 3; Piano Concerto No. 2 by Sergei Rachmaninoff choreo. by Lori Nichol	
2025–2026	El Tango de Roxanne (from Moulin Rouge!) performed by Ewan McGregor, Jacek Koman, & José Feliciano choreo. by Kenji Miyamoto; Get Lost (from Moana 2) by Abigail Barlow & Emily Bear performed by Awhimai Fraser choreo. by Kenji Miyamoto	Jin by Yu Takami, Seiko Nagaoka, & Kan Sawada choreo. by Kenji Miyamoto, Cathy Reed	Naatu Naatu by M. M. Keeravani & Chandrabose ft. Rahul Sipligunj & Kaala Bhairava choreo. by Kana Muramoto
2024–2025	Moonlight Sonata by Ludwig van Beethoven performed by Nobuyuki Tsujii choreo. by Shae-Lynn Bourne	María de Buenos Aires by Astor Piazzolla performed by Kremerata Musica, Gidon Kremer, & Julia Zenko choreo. by Lori Nichol	Moon River (from Breakfast at Tiffany's) by Henry Mancini performed by Audrey Hepburn
2023–2024	Avatar: The Way of Water; You Give Me Strength; Happiness Is Simple; Na'vi Attack by Simon Franglen choreo. by Kenji Miyamoto	Brotsjór by Ólafur Arnalds; Goliath by Woodkid; Meeting Laura (from Perfume: The Story of a Murderer) by Tom Tykwer, Johnny Klimek, and Reinhold Heil; November by Max Richter choreo. by Shae-Lynn Bourne	Break Free by Ariana Grande & Zedd
2022–2023	El Tango de Roxanne (from Moulin Rouge!) performed by Ewan McGregor, Jacek Koman, & José Feliciano choreo. by Kenji Miyamoto	Jin by Yu Takami, Seiko Nagaoka, & Kan Sawada choreo. by Cathy Reed	This Is Me (from The Greatest Showman) by Keala Settle
2021–2022	El Tango de Roxanne (from Moulin Rouge!) performed by Ewan McGregor, José Feliciano choreo. by Kenji Miyamoto; Heartlines by Florence and the Machine choreo. by Lance Vipond	Carmina Burana by Carl Orff choreo. by Cathy Reed	Bachelorette by Björk choreo. by Megumu Seki
2020–2021	Bachelorette by Björk choreo. by Megumu Seki	Sunday Afternoon by Carl Orff choreo. by Megumu Seki	

== Competitive highlights ==
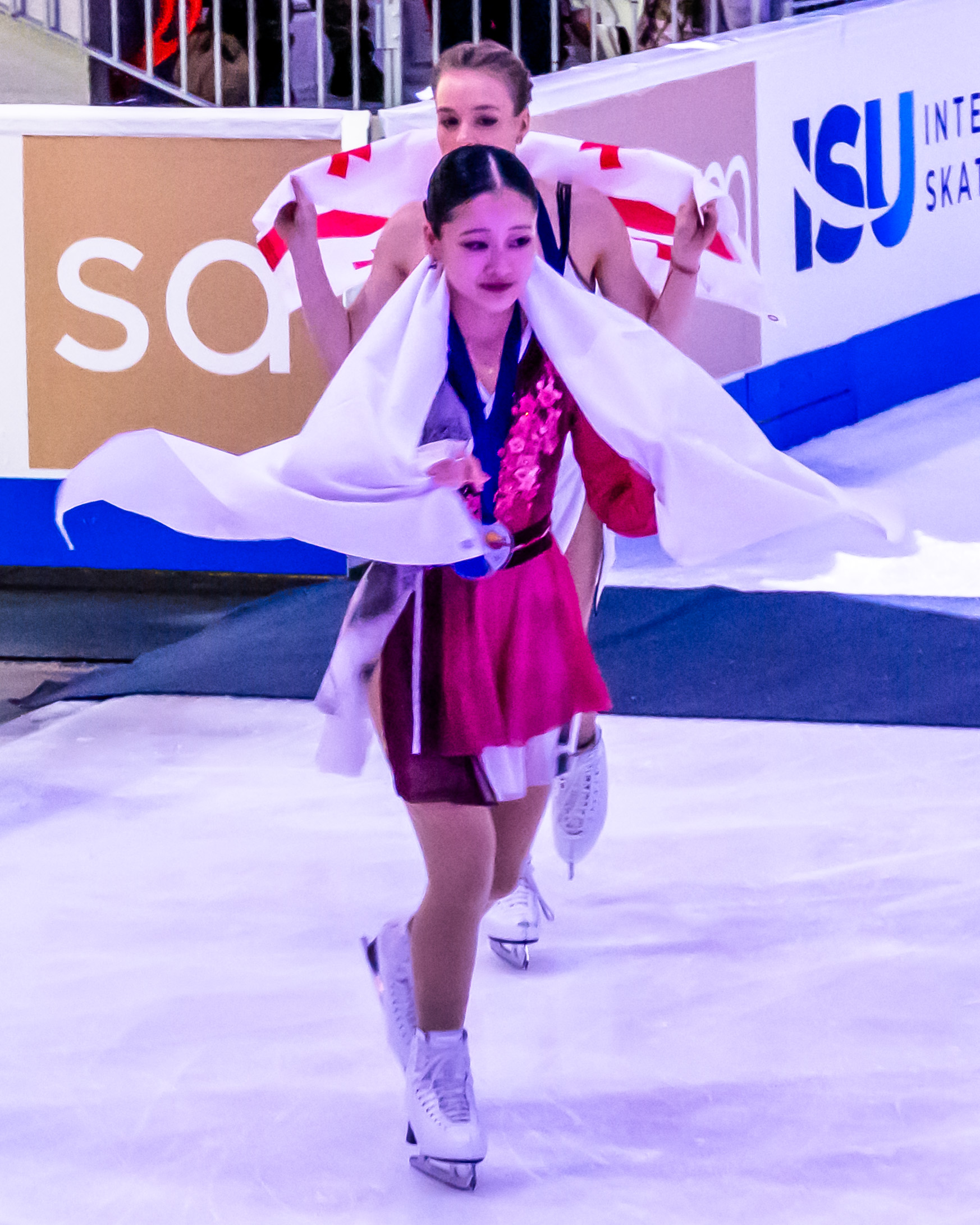
Watanabe during the medal ceremony 2025 Skate America

- GP – Event of the ISU Grand Prix Series
- CS – Event of the ISU Challenger Series
- TBD – Assigned

Competition placements at senior level
Season	2017–18	2018–19	2020–21	2021–22	2022–23	2023–24	2024–25	2025–26	2026–27
World Championships					10th				
Four Continents Championships					5th	3rd			
Grand Prix Final					4th			6th	
Japan Championships	19th	18th	27th	6th	12th	6th	7th	7th	
GP Cup of China						2nd	5th	3rd	11th
GP Finland									10th
GP NHK Trophy					5th				
GP Skate America							2nd	2nd	
GP Skate Canada					1st	6th			
CS Finlandia Trophy						2nd			
CS Kinoshita Group Cup								4th	
CS Lombardia Trophy					1st		8th		
CS Trialeti Trophy								7th	
Asian Open Trophy									1st
Challenge Cup							1st		
Coupe du Printemps				1st				2nd	

Competition placements at junior level
Season	2014–15	2015–16	2017–18	2018–19	2021–22
World Junior Championships					10th
Japan Championships	30th	13th	5th	4th	
Bavarian Open			2nd		2nd
Coupe du Printemps				1st	

== Detailed results ==
ISU personal best scores in the +5/-5 GOE System
Segment	Type	Score	Event
Total	TSS	213.14	2022 CS Lombardia Trophy
Short program	TSS	74.35	2025 Skate America
Short program	TES	41.95	2025 Skate America
Short program	PCS	32.92	2024 Cup of China
Free skating	TSS	146.31	2022 CS Lombardia Trophy
Free skating	TES	77.56	2022 CS Lombardia Trophy
Free skating	PCS	68.75	2022 CS Lombardia Trophy

=== Senior level ===
Results in the 2017–18 season
Date	Event	SP		FS		Total	
Date	Event	P	Score	P	Score	P	Score
Dec 21–24, 2017	2017–18 Japan Championships	19	55.46	18	106.45	19	161.91

Results in the 2018–19 season
Date	Event	SP		FS		Total	
Date	Event	P	Score	P	Score	P	Score
Dec 20–24, 2018	2018–19 Japan Championships	23	50.47	14	111.52	18	161.99

Results in the 2020–21 season
Date	Event	SP		FS		Total	
Date	Event	P	Score	P	Score	P	Score
Dec 24–27, 2020	2020–21 Japan Championships	27	46.18	—N/a	—N/a	27	46.18

Results in the 2021–22 season
Date	Event	SP		FS		Total	
Date	Event	P	Score	P	Score	P	Score
Dec 22–26, 2021	2021–22 Japan Championships	8	65.07	4	134.08	6	199.15
Mar 18–20, 2022	(Belgium) 2022 Coupe du Printemps	1	64.07	1	126.77	1	190.84

Results in the 2022–23 season
Date	Event	SP		FS		Total	
Date	Event	P	Score	P	Score	P	Score
Sep 16–19, 2022	(Italy) 2022 CS Lombardia Trophy	2	66.83	1	146.31	1	213.14
Oct 28–30, 2022	2022 Skate Canada International	6	63.27	1	134.32	1	197.59
Nov 18–20, 2022	(Japan) 2022 NHK Trophy	9	59.36	3	129.71	5	188.07
Dec 7–10, 2023	(China) 2023–24 Grand Prix Final	4	72.58	3	123.43	4	196.01
Dec 20–24, 2023	2023–24 Japan Championships	18	56.23	9	127.76	12	183.99
Feb 7–12, 2023	(United States) 2023 Four Continents Championships	8	65.60	4	134.90	5	200.50
Mar 20–28, 2023	(Japan) 2023 World Championships	15	60.90	7	131.91	10	192.81

Results in the 2023–24 season
Date	Event	SP		FS		Total	
Date	Event	P	Score	P	Score	P	Score
Oct 4–9, 2023	(Finland) 2023 CS Finlandia Trophy	3	62.73	4	117.63	2	180.36
Oct 27–29, 2023	2023 Skate Canada International	7	57.52	6	124.56	6	182.08
Nov 10–12, 2023	2023 Cup of China	2	65.09	2	138.13	2	203.22
Dec 19–22, 2024	2024–25 Japan Championships	8	63.66	7	131.22	6	194.88
Jan 30 – Feb 4, 2024	(China) 2024 Four Continents Championships	4	67.22	2	134.95	3	202.17

Results in the 2024–25 season
Date	Event	SP		FS		Total	
Date	Event	P	Score	P	Score	P	Score
Sep 13–15, 2024	(Italy) 2024 CS Lombardia Trophy	6	61.79	8	102.25	8	164.04
Oct 18–20, 2024	(United States) 2024 Skate America	3	66.54	3	128.68	2	195.22
Nov 22–24, 2024	2024 Cup of China	5	69.08	6	127.87	5	196.95
Dec 19–22, 2024	2024–25 Japan Championships	11	65.96	6	132.59	7	198.55
Feb 13–16, 2025	(Netherlands) 2025 Challenge Cup	1	75.86	1	137.50	1	213.36

Results in the 2025–26 season
Date	Event	SP		FS		Total	
Date	Event	P	Score	P	Score	P	Score
Sep 5–7, 2025	(Japan) 2025 CS Kinoshita Group Cup	8	57.73	3	131.82	4	189.55
Oct 8–11, 2025	(Georgia (country)) 2025 CS Trialeti Trophy	15	49.95	6	114.57	7	164.52
Oct 24–26, 2025	2025 Cup of China	2	74.01	5	124.62	3	198.63
Nov 14–16, 2025	(United States) 2025 Skate America	1	74.35	3	136.61	2	210.96
Dec 4–7, 2025	(Japan) 2025–26 Grand Prix Final	4	70.68	5	136.46	6	207.14
Dec 18–21, 2025	2025–26 Japan Championships	6	71.36	5	140.16	7	211.52
Mar 13–15, 2026	(Luxembourg) 2026 Coupe du Printemps	2	66.20	4	95.44	2	161.64

Results in the 2026–27 season
Date	Event	SP		FS		Total	
Date	Event	P	Score	P	Score	P	Score
Aug 1-5, 2026	(Indonesia) 2026 Asian Open Trophy	1	62.76	1	97.67	1	160.43
Nov 6–8, 2026	2026 Cup of China	11	55.72	11	99.14	11	154.86
Nov 20–22, 2026	(Finland) 2026 Finlandia Trophy	11	50.68	9	112.12	10	162.80

=== Junior level ===
2021–22 season
Date	Event	SP	FS	Total
13–17 April 2022	2022 World Junior Championships	11; 59.96	11; 105.48	10; 165.44
18–23 January 2022	2022 Bavarian Open	2; 59.57	2; 124.12	2; 183.69
2018–19 season
Date	Event	SP	FS	Total
15–17 March 2019	2019 Coupe du Printemps	1; 58.79	1; 94.50	1; 153.29
23–25 November 2018	2018–19 Japan Junior Championships	6; 54.16	5; 103.54	4; 157.70
2017–18 season
Date	Event	SP	FS	Total
26–31 January 2018	2018 Bavarian Open	2; 57.41	2; 106.95	2; 164.36
24–26 November 2017	2017–18 Japan Junior Championships	4; 59.45	5; 109.17	5; 168.62
2015–16 season
Date	Event	SP	FS	Total
21–23 November 2015	2015–16 Japan Junior Championships	9; 53.35	17; 87.55	13; 140.90
2014–15 season
Date	Event	SP	FS	Total
22–24 November 2014	2014–15 Japan Junior Championships	30; 38.83	–	30; 38.83
